= Mercedes-Benz Vito =

Light commercial van produced by Mercedes-Benz

Mercedes-Benz V-Class
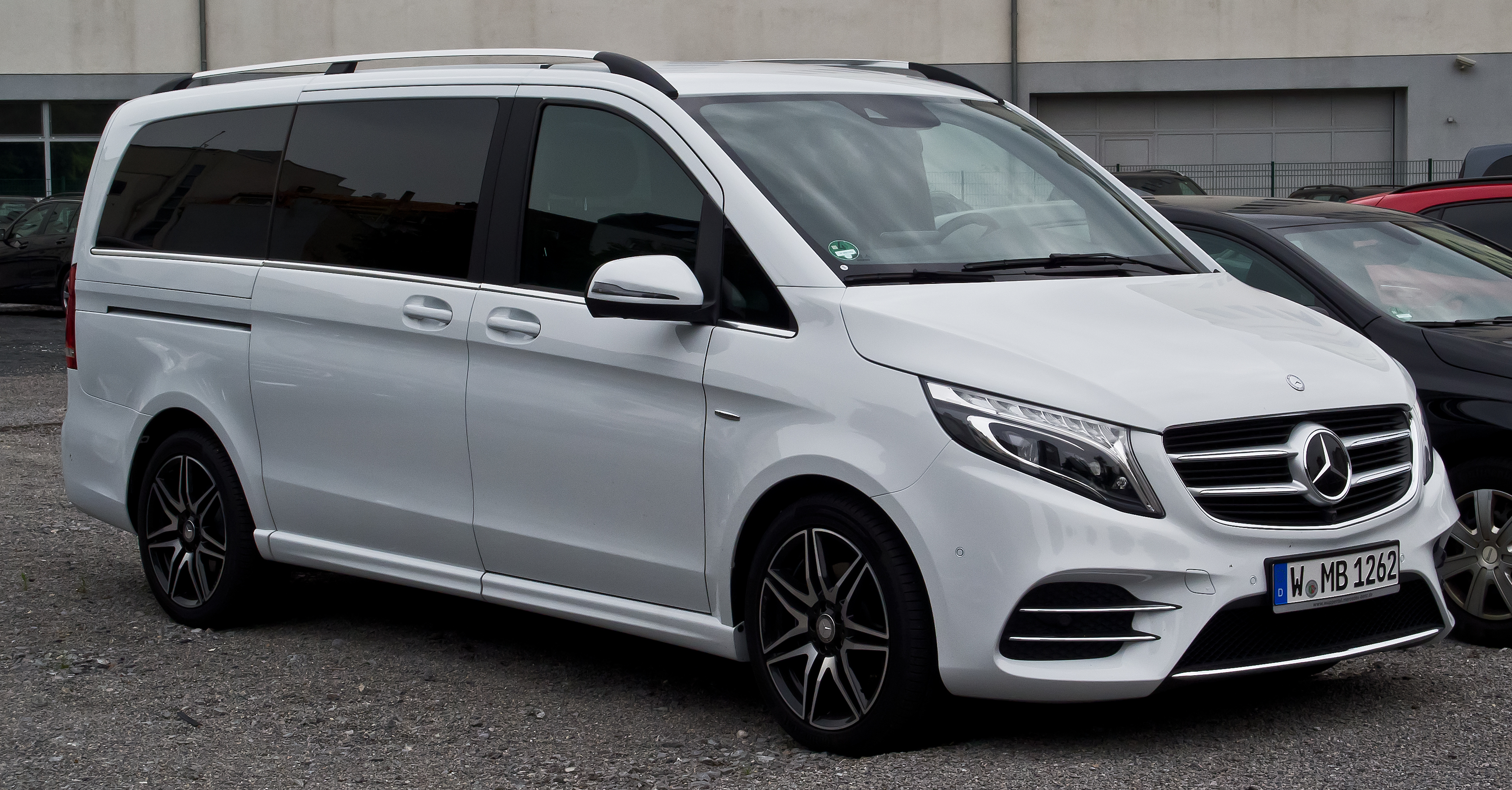

Overview
- Manufacturer: Daimler-Benz (1995–1998); DaimlerChrysler (1998–2007); Daimler AG (2007–2022); Mercedes-Benz Group (2022–present)
- Also called: Mercedes-Benz Vito (Van); Mercedes-Benz Viano (MPV); Mercedes-Benz V-Class (MPV); Mercedes-Benz Marco Polo (Campervan); Mercedes-Benz Metris (North American Models); Mercedes-Benz EQV (electric); Mercedes-Benz eVito Tourer (electric)
- Production: 1995–present

Body and chassis
- Class: Light commercial vehicle/Large MPV (V-Class/Viano) (M)
- Body style: 5-door minivan; 5-door cargo van

Chronology
- Predecessor: Mercedes-Benz MB100 (for Vito); Mercedes-Benz Viano (for V-Class)
- Successor: Mercedes-Benz VLE (for EQV)

The Mercedes-Benz Vito is a mid-sized light commercial vehicle (LCV) produced by Mercedes-Benz, available as a panel van, chassis cab, or multi-purpose vehicle (MPV), carrying cargo or up to eight passengers. In the Mercedes-Benz van lineup, it is positioned between the larger Sprinter and the smaller Citan.

The Vito refers to the cargo van variant for commercial use; when passenger accommodations are substituted for part or all of the load area, it is known as the Vito Traveliner, V-Class or Viano. The Traveliner/V-Class/Viano is a large MPV.

The first generation went on sale in 1996. The second generation was introduced in 2004, and the vehicle received the new Viano name. In 2010, the vehicle was facelifted with revised front and rear bumpers and lights. The interior was also improved with upgraded materials and new technology. The third generation was launched in 2014 and returned to being called V-Class.

The Vito/Viano is available in both rear- and four-wheel-drive configurations and comes in three lengths, two wheelbases and a choice of four petrol and diesel engines (as well as two specialist tuned models) coupled to either a six-speed manual or five-speed TouchShift automatic transmission.

== First generation (W638; 1996) ==
Mercedes-Benz W638
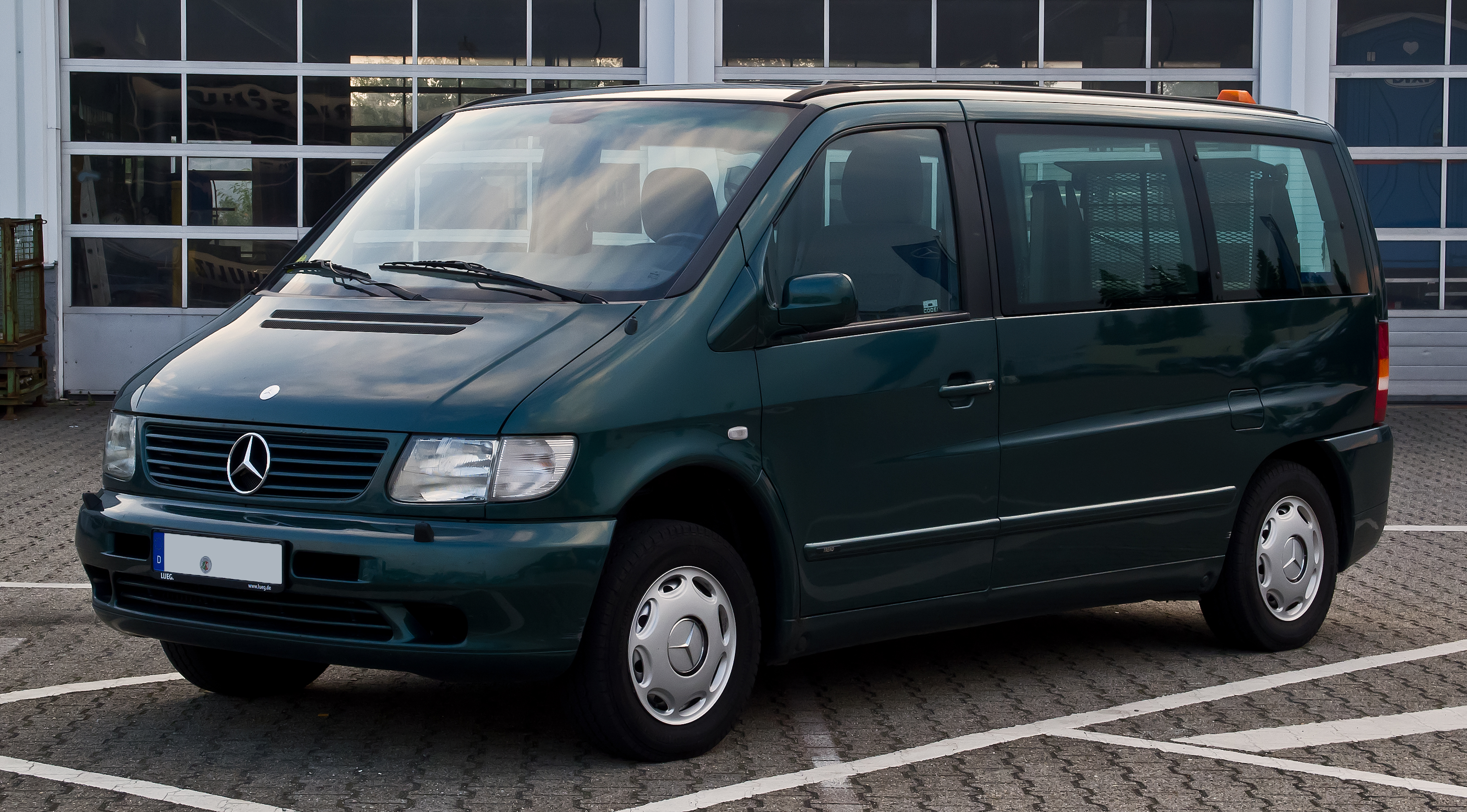

Overview
- Also called: Mercedes-Benz Viano; Mercedes-Benz V-Class
- Production: November 1995–2005
- Assembly: Spain: Vitoria-Gasteiz (Mercedes-Benz España, S.A.); Spain: Alcobendas (Mercedes-Benz España, S.A.U.; CKD); France: Ligny-en-Barrois

Body and chassis
- Layout: Front engine, front-wheel drive

Powertrain
- Transmission: 6-speed manual 4-speed automatic 5-speed automatic

Dimensions
- Wheelbase: 3,000 mm (120 in)
- Length: 4,600 mm (180 in)
- Width: 1,870 mm (74 in)
- Height: 1,844 mm (72.6 in)

V-Class (W 638)

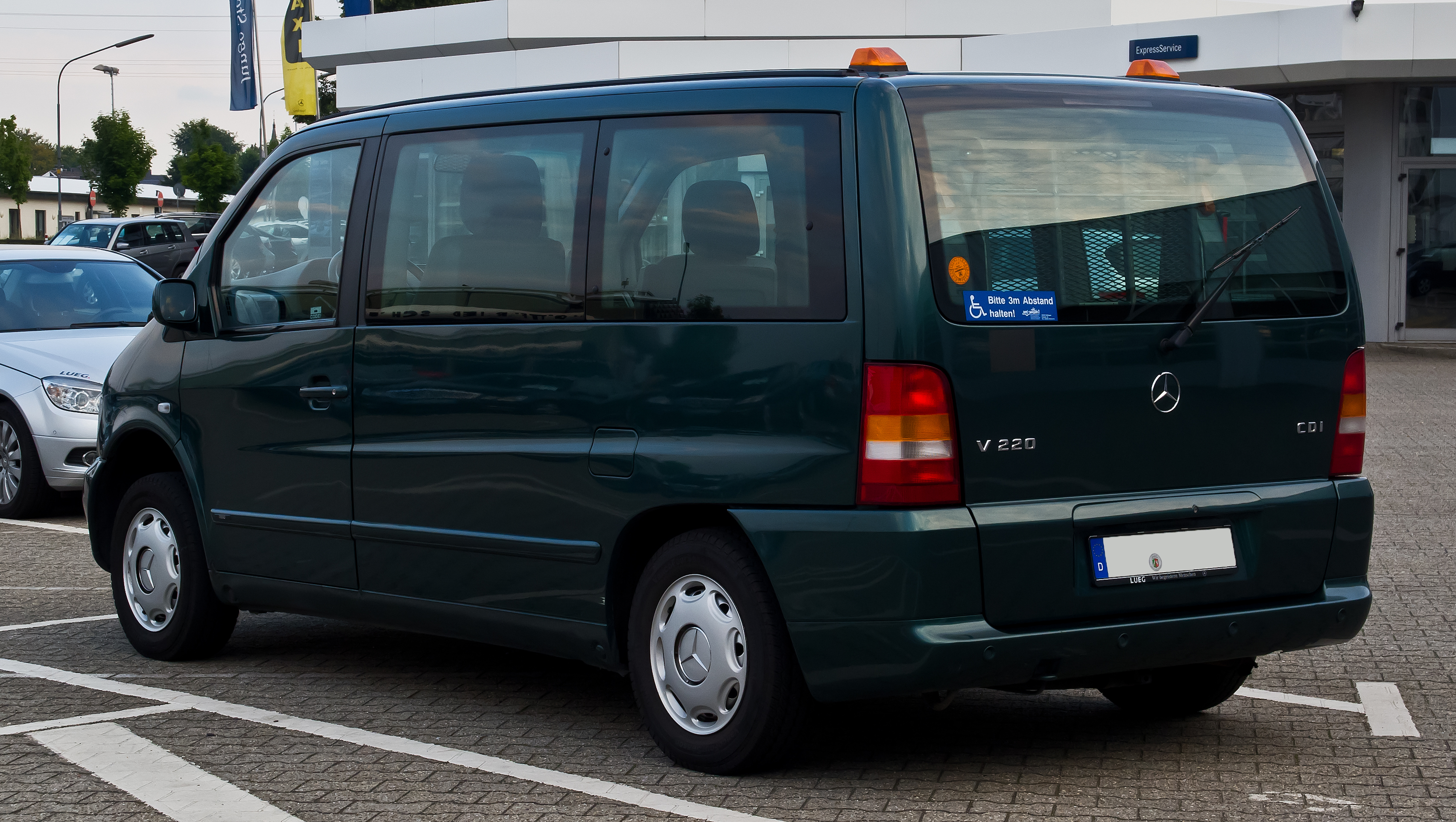
Rear view

The first generation Mercedes-Benz Vito was produced between 1996 and 2003. It is powered either by a diesel engine with up to 120 bhp (89 kW; 122 PS) or a gasoline engine with up to 140 bhp (104 kW; 142 PS) and a front-wheel drive drivetrain. The range of gasoline engines consists of two old units from Mercedes (113 and 114) and a Volkswagen 2.8 VR6 engine, designated as the M104.900. When it comes to diesel engines, old 2.3 with and without turbo and also modern CDI 2.2 engines are available.

This body design was also sold as the V-Klasse in a more luxurious and expensive version (V-Klasse was replaced with the Viano name for the second generation of Vito). The Viano also included less van-like features to the Vito such as only two seats in the front and a larger and more spacious seating capacity. At first, many Vito drivers who wanted a spacious, small van opted for the Vito microbus which was extremely similar to the Viano, apart from its more van-like and less luxurious features. The Viano was however a good, more car-like option to the Vito microbus. It was designed by Michael Mauer from 1989 to 1991, when the final design was chosen and patented in February 1993, competing with the Citroën Jumpy, Peugeot Expert, Volkswagen Transporter, Fiat Scudo, Ford Transit, Hyundai H-1, Opel Vivaro, Renault Trafic, Toyota Hiace, and the GAZ Sobol.

=== Vito 108 E ===
A battery-electric variant of the W 638 was unveiled in July 1996, designated the Vito 108 E. The 108 E was fitted with a three-phase asynchronous electric traction motor that developed 40 kW (54 hp) and had a stall torque of 190 N⋅m (140 lbf⋅ft), driving the wheels through a five-speed manual transmission. Energy storage was provided by a molten-salt battery (ZEBRA sodium nickel-chloride chemistry) carried under the rear bench seat. The traction battery weighed 420 kg (930 lb), operated at a nominal voltage of 280 V, and had a total capacity of 35.6 kW-hr, giving the vehicle a range of up to 170 km (110 mi). The Vito 108 E was capable of speeds up to 120 km/h (75 mph) and could carry up to 600 kg (1,300 lb).

The 108 E was assembled at the "Competence Centre for Emission-free Mobility" (KEM) at the Mercedes-Benz Mannheim plant; due to the small scale of production and battery costs, it was estimated the 108 E would be three times the cost of a conventionally-powered Vito. Deutsche Post operated a small fleet of Vito 108 E delivery vans in Bremen.

=== Powertrain ===
Fuel	Model	Engine type	Displacement	Cylinder/Valves	Max. power at rpm	Max. torque at rpm at min^{−1}	construction time
Petrol	V 200, Vito 113	M111 E20	1,998 cm^{3} (2.0 L)	R4/16	95 kW (127 hp)/5100	186 Nm/3600–4500	1996–2003
Petrol	V 230, Vito 114	M111 E23	2,295 cm^{3} (2.3 L)	R4/16	105 kW (141 hp)/5000	215 Nm/3500–4500	1996–2003
Petrol	V 280	Volkswagen VR6	2,792 cm^{3} (2.8 L)	6/12	128 kW (172 hp)/6000	237 Nm/2800–3200	1997-2003
Diesel	Vito 108 D	OM601 D23	2,299 cm^{3} (2.3 L)	R4/8	58 kW (78 hp)/3800	152 Nm/2300-3000	1996-1999
Diesel	V 230 TD, Vito 110 D	OM601 D23 LA	2,299 cm^{3} (2.3 L)	R4/8	72 kW (97 hp)/3800	230 Nm/1700-2400	1996-1999
Diesel	Vito 108 CDI	OM611 DE22 LA red.	2,151 cm^{3} (2.2 L)	R4/16	60 kW (80 hp)/3800	200 Nm/1500-2400	1999-2003
Diesel	V 200 CDI, Vito 110 CDI	OM611 DE22 LA red.	2,151 cm^{3} (2.2 L)	R4/16	75 kW (101 hp)/3800	250 Nm/1600–2400	1999-2003
Diesel	V 220 CDI, Vito 112 CDI	OM611 DE22 LA	2,151 cm^{3} (2.2 L)	R4/16	90 kW (121 hp)/3800	300 Nm/1800–2500	1999-2003

== Second generation (W639; 2003) ==
Mercedes-Benz W639
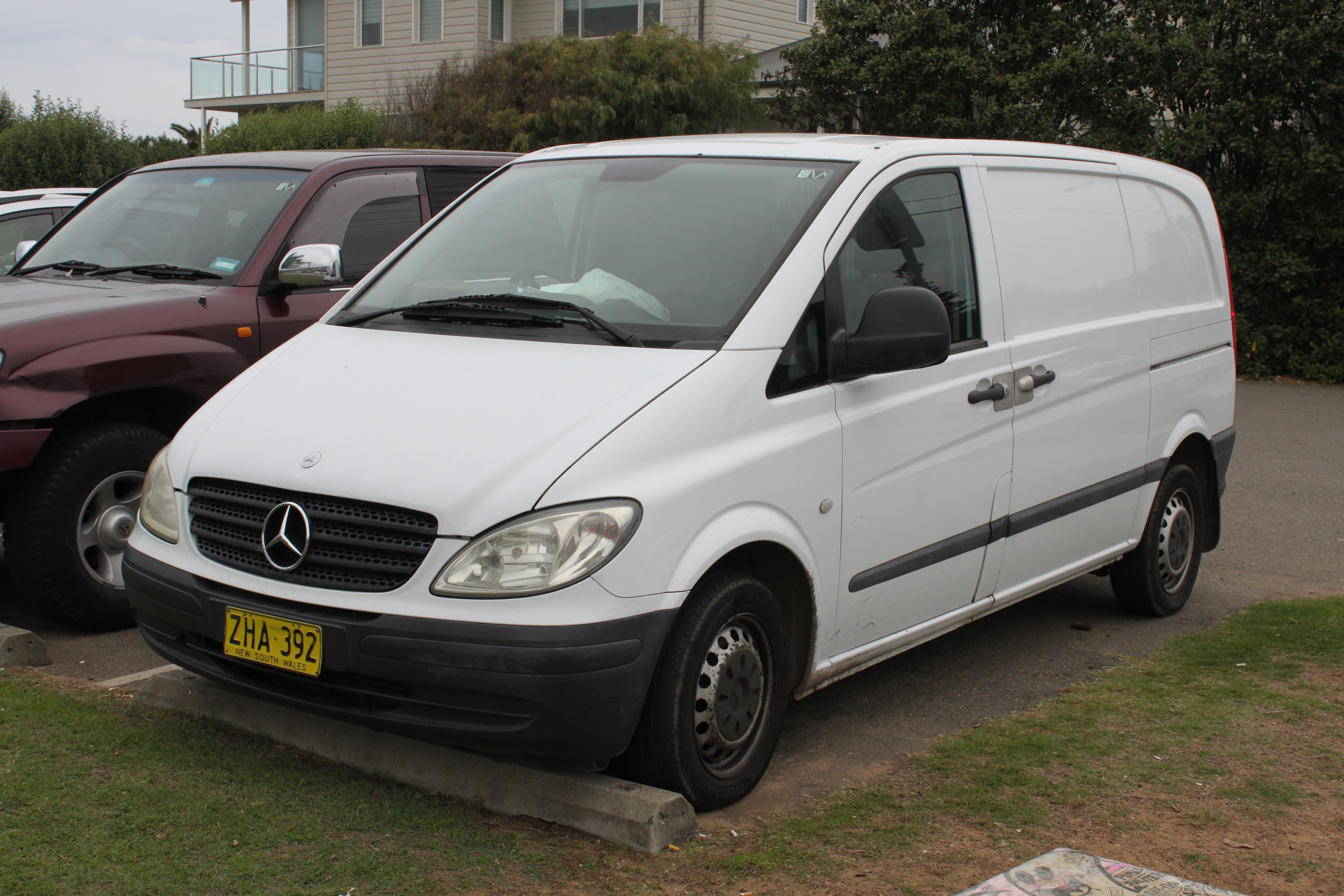

Overview
- Also called: Mercedes-Benz Viano; Mercedes-Benz Valente (Australia); Mercedes-Benz V-Class (Japan)
- Production: 2003–2014 (Spain); 2008–present (Mexico); 2010–2015 (China)
- Assembly: Spain: Vitoria-Gasteiz (Mercedes-Benz España, S.A.); Spain: Alcobendas (Mercedes-Benz España, S.A.U.; CKD); Mexico: Santiago Tianguistenco (Mercedes-Benz Mexico); China: Fuzhou (Fujian Daimler)

Body and chassis
- Body style: 4-door van 4-door minibus
- Layout: FR Layout; F4 Layout
- Platform: Mercedes-Benz NCV2

Powertrain
- Engine: 2.1 L OM646 980 L4 Turbo Diesel (China); 2.1 L OM646 DE22 LA R L4 Diesel; 2.1 L OM651 DE22 L4 Diesel; 3.0 L OM642 V6 Diesel; 2.5 L M272 924 V6 Petrol (China); 3.0 L M272 939 V6 Petrol (China); 3.2 L M112 E32 V6 Petrol (2010–); 3.5 L M272 E35 V6 Petrol; 3.7 L M112 E37 V6 Petrol; 3.8 L Brabus V6 Petrol; 6.0 L M113 Brabus V8 Petrol
- Transmission: 6-speed Manual; 5-speed TouchShift (Automatic)

Dimensions
- Wheelbase: 3,200 mm (126.0 in) (SWB); 3,430 mm (135.0 in) (LWB)
- Length: 4,748–5,223 mm (186.9–205.6 in)
- Width: 1,906 mm (75.0 in)
- Height: 1,875 mm (73.8 in)
- Curb weight: 2,040–2,135 kg (4,497–4,707 lb)

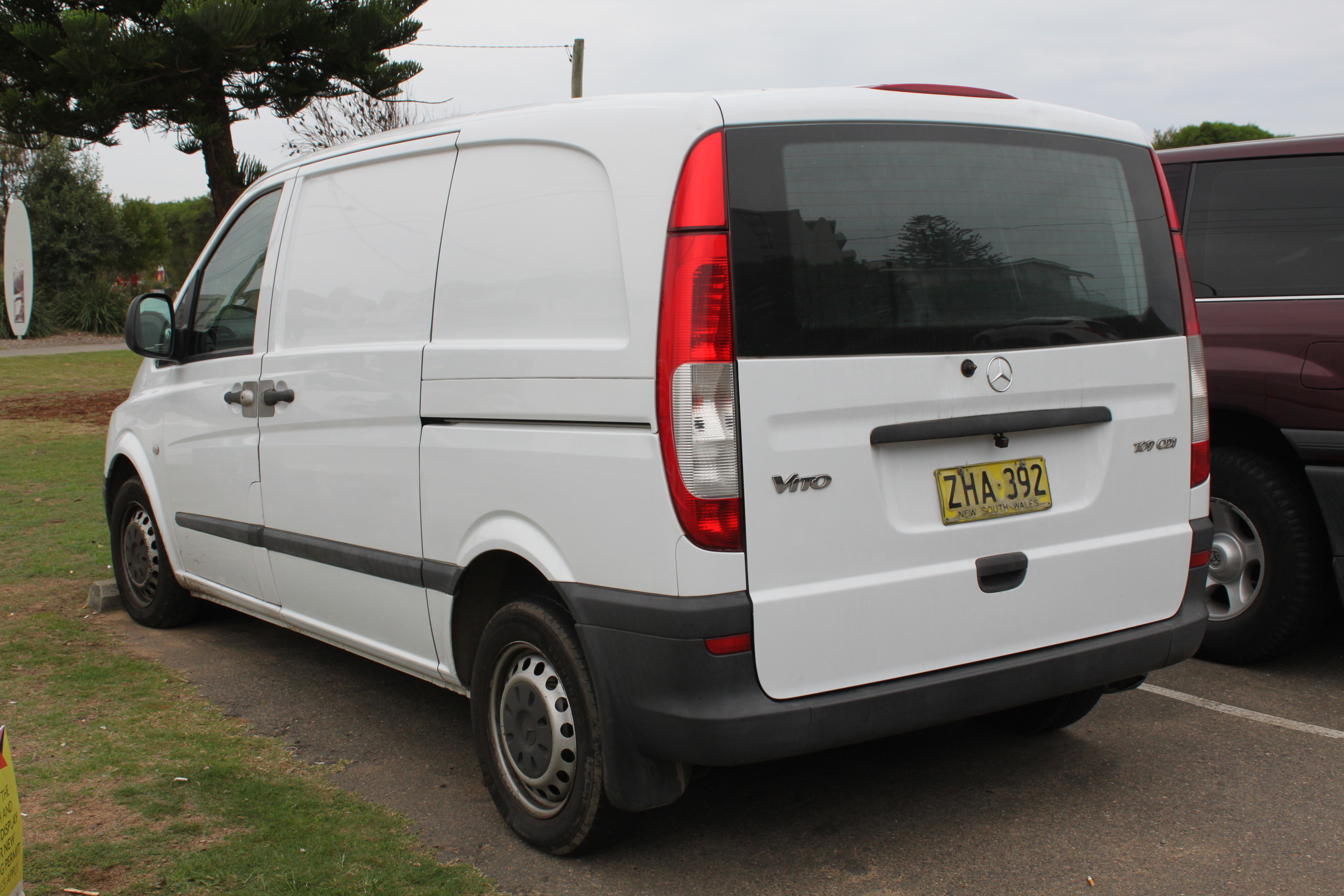
Rear view (with lift up tailgate)

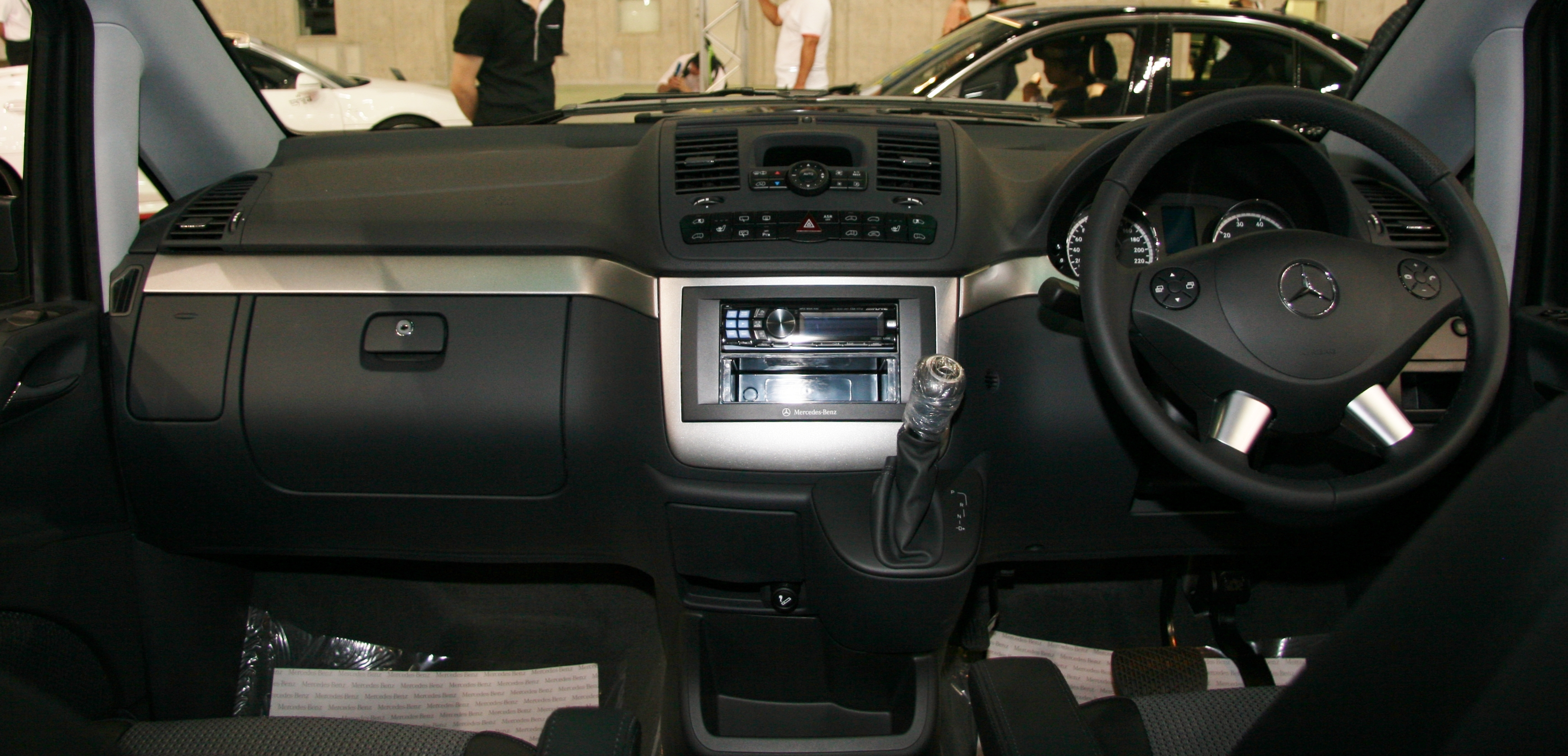
Interior

Six or seven seats come as standard in most markets. The Viano can be turned into an eight-seat people carrier by fitting two three-seater benches in the rear. All rear seats slide in 1 in (2.5 cm) increments, recline and can be turned to face one other. They can also be folded down or removed completely to increase the load capacity. A rear folding table is standard in six- and seven-seat layouts. The rear seats cannot be folded into the floor like on some rivals.

With all the seats removed the Viano Extra-Long can accommodate up to 4,610 litres (163 ft^{3}) of cargo with a payload of 930 kg (2,050 lb). It can tow a 2,500 kg (5,512 lb) braked trailer and a 750 kg (1,653 lb) unbraked trailer. An adjustable self-levelling rear suspension is included on higher specification models.

Rear-wheel drive allows the Viano to have a smaller turning circle than front-wheel drive rivals; Compact and Long models have a turning circle of 11.8 m (39 ft) whereas the Extra-Long model turns in 12.5 m (41 ft).

Japan passenger models were sold as the V-Class, as the V 350. Early models included V 350 Trend (RHD), V 350 Ambiente (RHD), V 350 Ambiente long (RHD).

In 2012, Mercedes-Benz released the Valente model in Australia to sit beneath the Viano as the entry-level passenger van.

=== Initial release ===
==== Vito ====
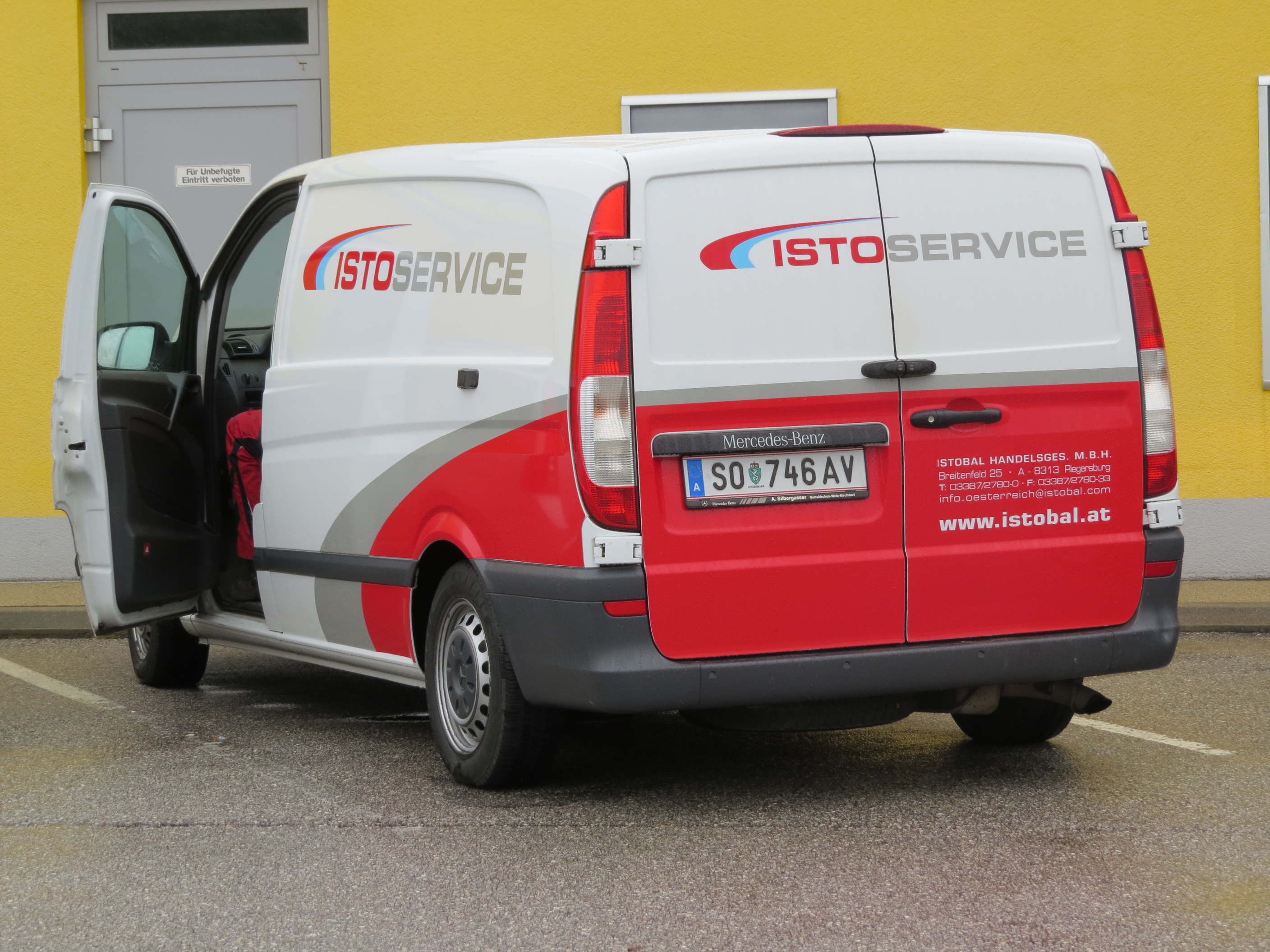
Vito (with barn doors)

The Vito was launched in China in April 2010. Engine choices consisted of the 2.1 litre OM646 turbo diesel four-cylinder, the 2.5 litre M272 diesel V6 and the 3 litre diesel V6 which also uses the M272 name. A 6 speed manual gearbox is standard for four cylinder diesel variants while V6 diesel variants are equipped to a 5 speed automatic gearbox. Trims levels are available known as the 2.1T Diesel Elite. 2.1T Diesel Service, 2.5L Elite, 2.5L Service, 3.0L Service and 3.0L Business. Pricing ranges from 316,000 yuan to 389,000 yuan (46,000 to US$55,830 - March 2020 exchange rate). For actual car badging, the 2.1 litre Diesel models were known as the 115 CDI, the 119 for 2.5 litre V6 models and the 122 for 3 litre V6 models. The W639 Vito was then succeeded by the W447 in 2016 although most Vitos of the W639 variant are still in use for the Chinese market as of 2020 as ambulance vans in Beijing.

The second generation Mercedes-Benz Vito design that is more streamlined than its predecessor, powered by a new range of engines, and a rear-wheel drive (RWD) drivetrain.

The angle of the windshield and A-pillar is closer to horizontal; the dashboard is bigger and the bonnet (hood) smaller. The new Vito is available in three different lengths and four diesel engine versions: the 109 CDI, 111 CDI, 115 CDI (all powered by a 4-cylinder 2.2-litre engine) and the 120 CDI (featuring the 3.0-litre V6 unit). The model numerics relate to their engine power output: currently the 109 has 95 PS (70 kW; 94 hp), the 111 has 116 PS (85 kW; 114 hp), the 115 has 150 PS (110 kW; 148 hp), and the 120 has 204 PS (150 kW; 201 hp). Blue-efficiency technology is optional. The vehicles have a new 6-speed manual gearbox gear ratios designed for fuel economy. The second generation Vitos are Euro 3 compliant (additionally Euro 4 compliant as of November 2006) and exempt from the Low Emission Zone in London, which requires commercial vehicles (vans) to reach at least Euro 3 standard from October 2010.

==== Vito London Taxi ====
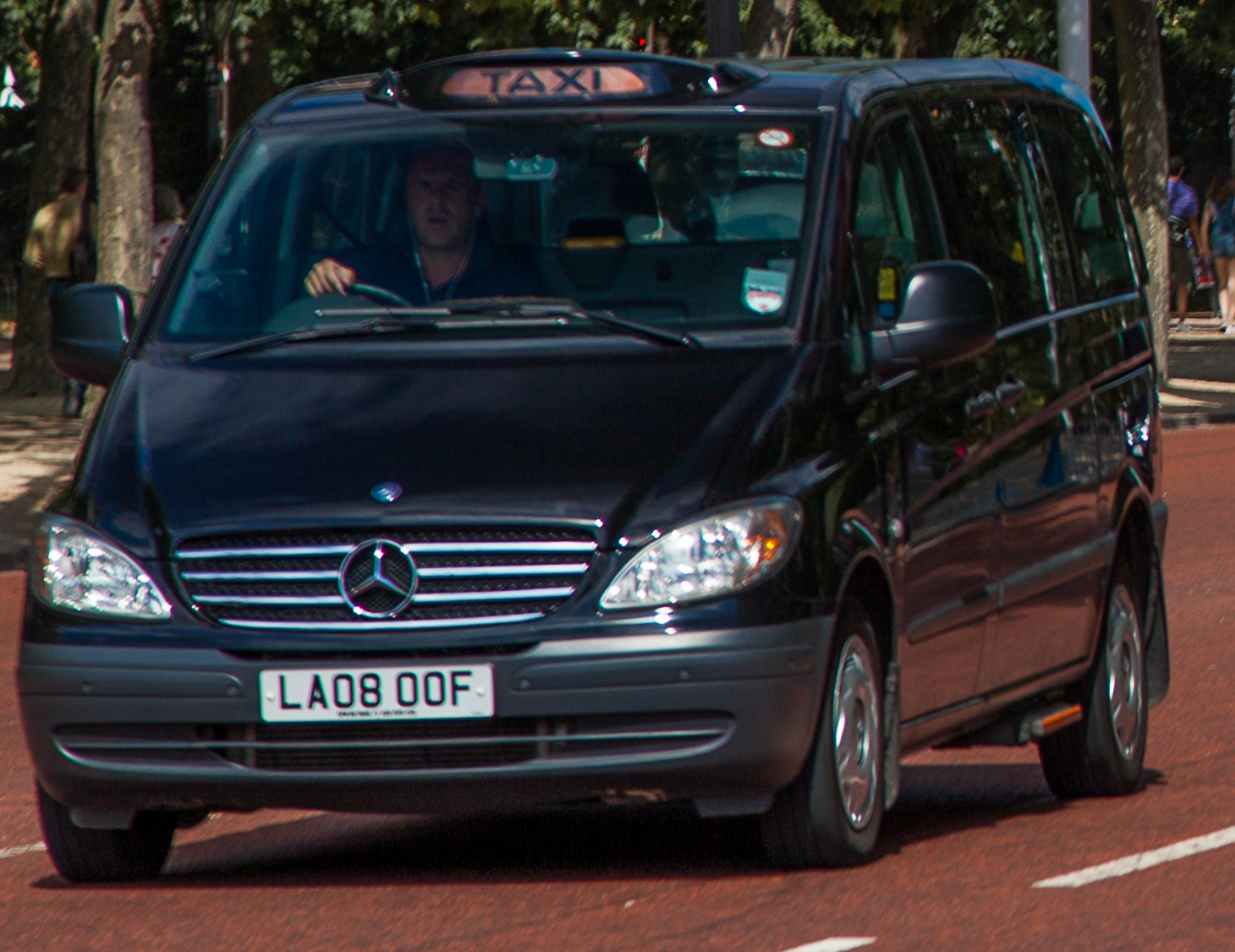
Vito London Taxi

In August 2008, a variant of the Vito was approved by the Public Carriage Office for use as a licensed London 'black cab'. The Vito taxicab includes electric sliding doors, electric steps and seating for six people. The Vito's rear-wheel steering enables it to meet the PCO's strict Conditions of Fitness requirements including a 25 ft (7.6 m) turning circle and wheelchair accessibility. The vehicle, a variation of the 'Traveliner' model, is built by Penso in Coventry. The rear wheel steer system is licensed from one80, and it is distributed through Eco City Vehicles subsidiary KPM-UK Taxis.

The new Taxi does not perform the famous U-turn in the same way as the TX and Metro models, instead it incorporates an electrically operated rear wheel system, activated by a button adjacent to the steering wheel. This turns the rear wheels in the opposite direction to the front wheels, thus allowing the Taxi to perform the same tight turning circle as the TX and Metro models. This system is only possible when the vehicle is traveling at less than 5 mph (8.0 km/h), and if the vehicle goes over this speed while the LSM is active, it is deactivated, and the wheels straighten up.

It is longer and wider than the TX models, but travelling through tight spaces is aided by the electric folding wing mirrors, which as of 2009 are standard.

==== Viano Marco Polo ====
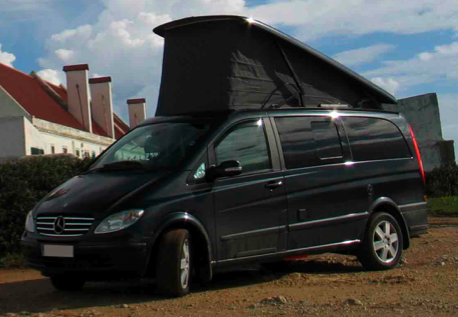
Viano Marco Polo camping edition

In some countries a camping derivative is available - known as the Marco Polo - equipped with a galley (including gas stove, sink, 40 L fridge, and storage), multi-function wardrobe and a sliding bench seat in the rear which can be turned into a large air-sprung bed. A pop-up roof is also standard (electric assist is optional) providing standing height inside. An additional bed can be fitted in the pop-up roof area to increase sleeping capacity to four individuals. Fresh water and waste water tanks are accessible from outside the vehicle, while the gas-cylinder bay is hidden inside an interior cupboard. An auxiliary battery is included under the front passenger seat. Up to six optional individual seats can be fitted for maximum MPV flexibility, but only four seats (including the two-seater bench mentioned above) can be used when in camping mode.

The Marco Polo was designed and created in partnership with Westfalia just like Volkswagen camper vans were until 1999, when Daimler AG bought a controlling stake in the conversion company meaning Volkswagen had to continue converting their commercial vehicles into camper vans alone. This is a rival for the Volkswagen California as they both have similar layouts.

==== Viano X-Clusive (2008–2010) ====
This edition was only available in European markets from 2008 to 2010 with either a petrol or diesel V6 engine. It was available in either Brilliant Silver or Obsidian Black metallic paint, and featured a redesigned radiator grille, 18-inch alloy wheels, a chromed exhaust tailpipe, side skirts, and unique front and rear bumpers. The interior had pebble or anthracite coloured 'Twin' leather seats and a choice of grey or brown burr walnut wood accents.

==== Engines ====
Years	Model & Transmission	Engine	Power	Torque	Top Speed	0–62 mph (0–100 km/h)	Economy	Emissions
Diesel
2004–2007	Viano 2.0 CDI	2.2 L, 4 in-L	109 PS (80 kW)	290 N⋅m (214 lb⋅ft)	99 mph (159 km/h)	17.6 s	31.7 mpg_{‑imp} (8.9 L/100 km)	235 g/km
2004–2007	Viano 2.0 CDI TouchShift	2.2 L, 4 in-L	109 PS (80 kW)	290 N⋅m (214 lb⋅ft)	98 mph (158 km/h)	17.3 s	31.7 mpg_{‑imp} (8.9 L/100 km)	235 g/km
2007–2010	Viano 2.0 CDI	2.2 L, 4 in-L	116 PS (85 kW)	290 N⋅m (214 lb⋅ft)	99 mph (159 km/h)	17.6 s	34.9 mpg_{‑imp} (8.1 L/100 km)	215 g/km
2007–2010	Viano 2.0 CDI TouchShift	2.2 L, 4 in-L	116 PS (85 kW)	290 N⋅m (214 lb⋅ft)	98 mph (158 km/h)	17.3 s	32.8 mpg_{‑imp} (8.6 L/100 km)	229 g/km
2004–2010	Viano 2.2 CDI	2.2 L, 4 in-L	150 PS (110 kW)	330 N⋅m (243 lb⋅ft)	112 mph (180 km/h)	14.9 s	34.9 mpg_{‑imp} (8.1 L/100 km)	215 g/km
2004–2010	Viano 2.2 CDI TouchShift	2.2 L, 4 in-L	150 PS (110 kW)	330 N⋅m (243 lb⋅ft)	111 mph (179 km/h)	13.0 s	32.8 mpg_{‑imp} (8.6 L/100 km)	229 g/km
2006–2010	Viano 3.0 CDI TouchShift	3.0 L, 6 in-V	204 PS (150 kW)	440 N⋅m (325 lb⋅ft)	123 mph (198 km/h)	9.2 s	30.7 mpg_{‑imp} (9.2 L/100 km)	244 g/km
Petrol
	Viano 3.0 V6 TouchShift	3.2 L, 6 in-V	190 PS (140 kW)					
	Viano 3.2 V6 TouchShift	3.2 L, 6 in-V	218 PS (160 kW)					
2004–2007	Viano 3.7 V6 TouchShift	3.7 L, 6 in-V	231 PS (170 kW)	345 N⋅m (254 lb⋅ft)	119 mph (192 km/h)	11.0 s	23.2 mpg_{‑imp} (12.2 L/100 km)	294 g/km
2007-	Viano 3.5 V6 TouchShift	3.5 L, 6 in-V	258 PS (190 kW)	340 N⋅m (251 lb⋅ft)	127 mph (204 km/h)	9.3 s	23.7 mpg_{‑imp} (11.9 L/100 km)	284 g/km
n/a	Viano 4.4 Brabus TouchShift	4.3 L, 6 in-V	325 PS (239 kW)	430 N⋅m (317 lb⋅ft)	143 mph (230 km/h)	7.2 s	n/a	n/a
2004-	Viano 6.1 Brabus TouchShift	6.0 L, 8 in-V	426 PS (313 kW) at 5400 rpm	621 N⋅m (458 lb⋅ft) at 4100 rpm	245 km/h (152 mph)	6.2 s	n/a	n/a

==== Environmental impact ====
EcoTest analysed the emissions from the EU4-compliant 2.0 CDI 116 PS (85 kW; 114 hp) and 2.2 CDI 150 PS (110 kW; 148 hp) manuals and the EU5-compliant 2.2 CDI 163 PS (120 kW; 161 hp) TouchShift; the results are below:

(68/100)	2006–2010	2.0 CDI Manual	116 hp	Diesel
(46/100)	2004–2010	2.2 CDI Manual	150 hp	Diesel

Next Green Car - an expert environmental organisation that analyses official vehicle emissions data rated the Viano. These Green Ratings (from 0 (cleanest) to 100 (dirtiest)) are listed below:

68	2006–2010	3.0 CDI TouchShift	204 hp
70	2004–2010	2.0 CDI TouchShift	116 hp
71	2004–2010	2.0 CDI Manual	116 hp
71	2004–2010	2.2 CDI Manual	150 hp
75	2007–2010	3.5 V6 TouchShift	258 hp
79	2004–2010	2.2 CDI TouchShift	150 hp

==== Reviews ====
The Mercedes-Benz Viano has received mixed to positive reviews from the motoring press. The van-based design is seen as a blessing by some critics and a failing by others. As of July 2010 reviews for the facelifted Viano are not available.

- AA, The
  'Image is everything in the world of business and it should come as no surprise that the Viano is the big cheese in the executive travel world.'
- Autocar
  'Still more van than MPV. Airport transport.'
- Parker's
  'Pros: Capable of carrying eight in comfort, massive and versatile interior, superb diesels'.
  'Cons: Sheer size makes it difficult to manoeuvre, can't hide commercial vehicle origins.'
- RAC
  'With its rare combination of spacious seating and generous luggage capacity, the Viano is a paragon of practicality...'
- What Car?
  'For - Comes with a choice of two wheelbases and three body lengths, plus a variety of seating arrangements and plenty of space inside. The sliding rear side doors ease access.'
  'Against - It's an expensive option, whose van roots show through in some areas. The engines are noisy and it's not easy to use the car's full versatility...'
- Yahoo! Cars
  "Most MPVs never make that much sense because when full of people there's nowhere for the luggage to go. No such problem exists with the vast Viano."

==== Motorsports ====
- 2006: The Viano was a support vehicle in the Dakar Rally for the Mercedes-Benz Service and Kwikpower team.
- 2009: The Viano claimed victory in the SUV category in the 19th Rallye Aicha des Gazelles with Irishwoman Jeanette James as pilot and Frenchwoman Anne-Marie Ortola as navigator.

==== Production ====
On 16 April 2010 the assembly of the Viano W639 began at the Fujian Daimler Automotive plant in Fuzhou, China. Forty per cent of the components and automotive parts of the Chinese model version are manufactured by local companies. The Chinese model was launched on the Chinese (Hong Kong, PRC and Republic), the South Korean and Southeast Asian market in April 2010.

=== 2010 facelift ===
==== Viano ====
Changes to the Viano range include standard BlueEFFICIENCY technology, new interior trim materials, new ambient lighting system with dimmable individual LED reading lamps and fibre optic units, optional rear seat entertainment system, redesigned cockpit, new suspension with front and rear axles revised and specially tuned to match each specific model and EU 5 emission standards compliance.

The facelifted range included four and six-cylinder diesel and petrol engines rated at 100 kW (134 hp; 136 PS) to 190 kW (255 hp; 258 PS) (CDI 2.0, CDI 2.2, CDI 3.0, 3.5).

A four-wheel drive (4MATIC) is optional on models with 4-cylinder diesel engines. In normal operation the system transfers driving power in a 35:65 split between the front and rear axles. The 4MATIC system does not have mechanical differential locks, but an electronic traction system (4ETS). If one or more wheels loses traction on a slippery surface, the system applies brief pulses of brake pressure to the spinning wheels thus increasing torque to wheels with good grip. Vehicles with four-wheel drive have a higher ride height, which increases approach, departure and breakover angles (20°/28°/19° respectively, versus 14°/22°/14° in conventional rear-wheel-drive models). The all-wheel drive adds 80 kg (176 lb) to the total weight of the vehicle.

Pre-facelift

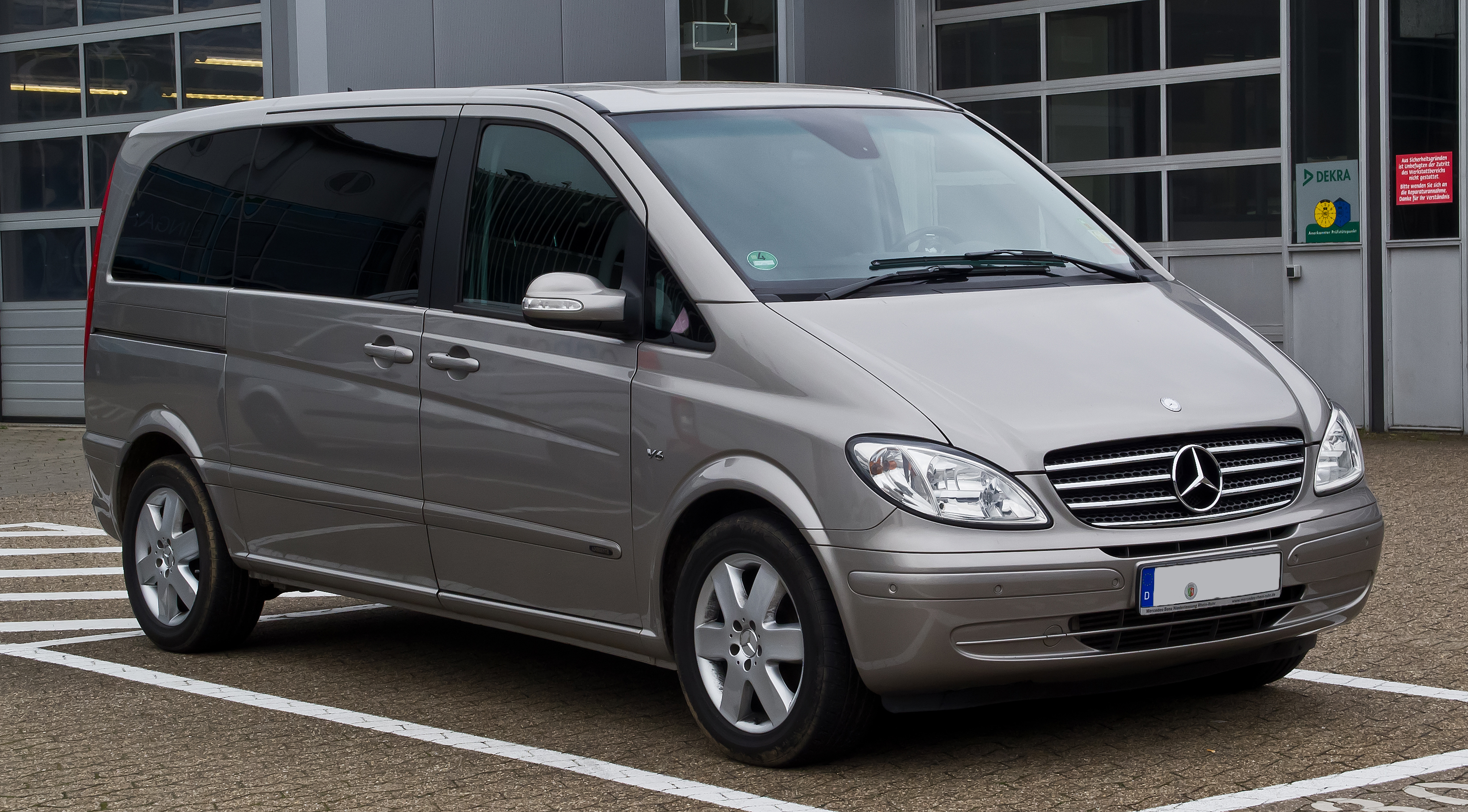
Front (short)

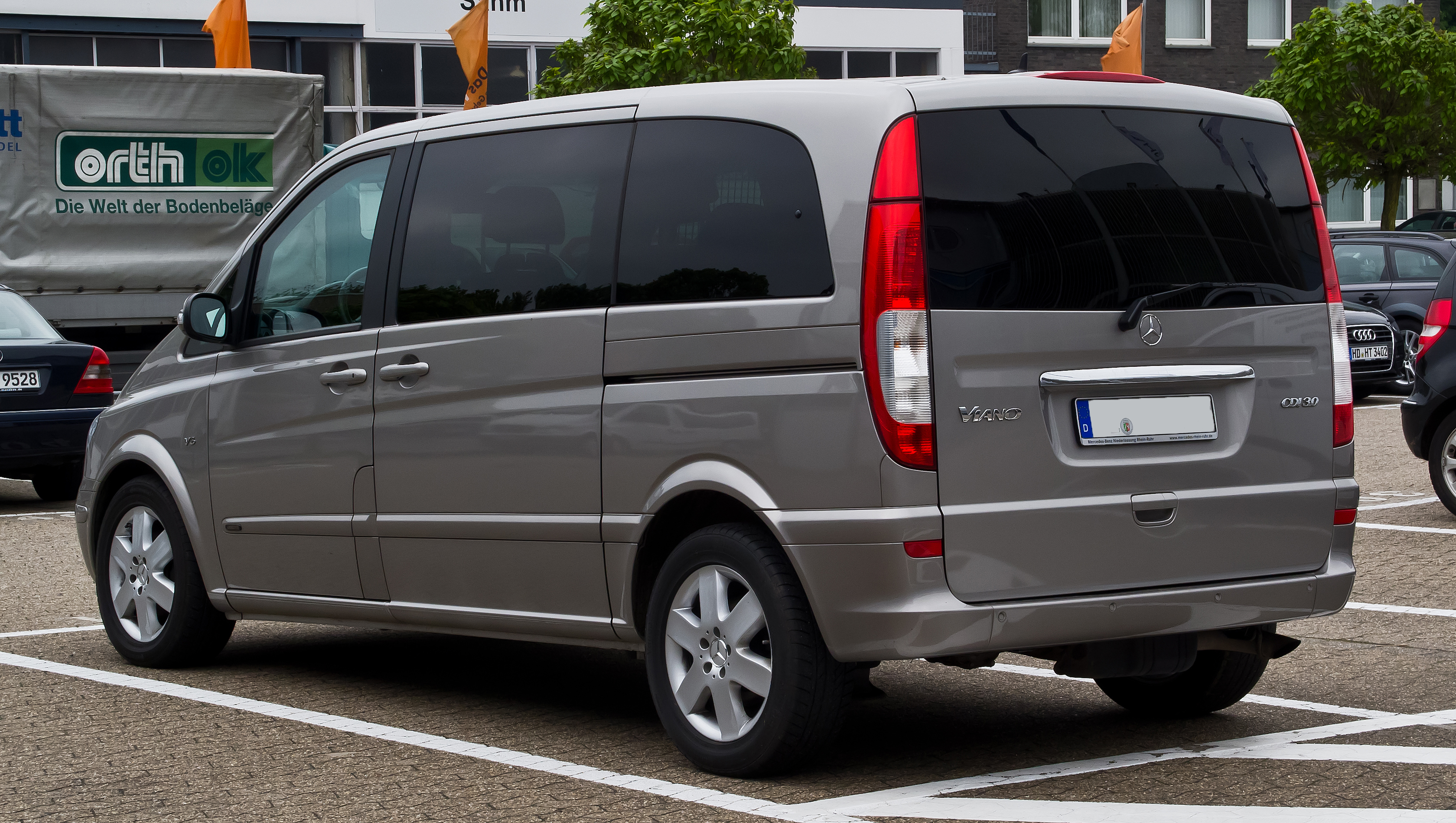
Rear (short)

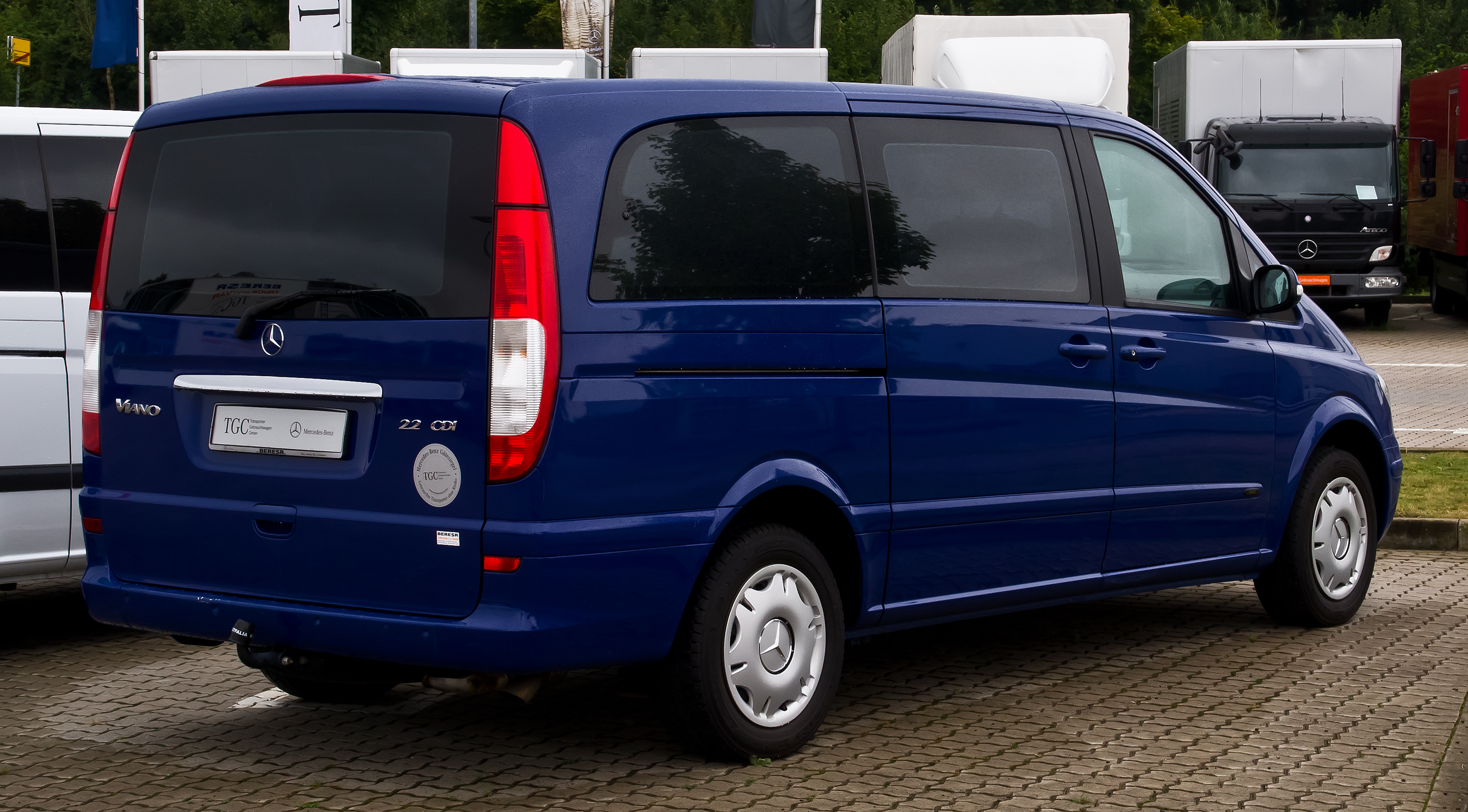
Rear (long, still SWB)

Facelift

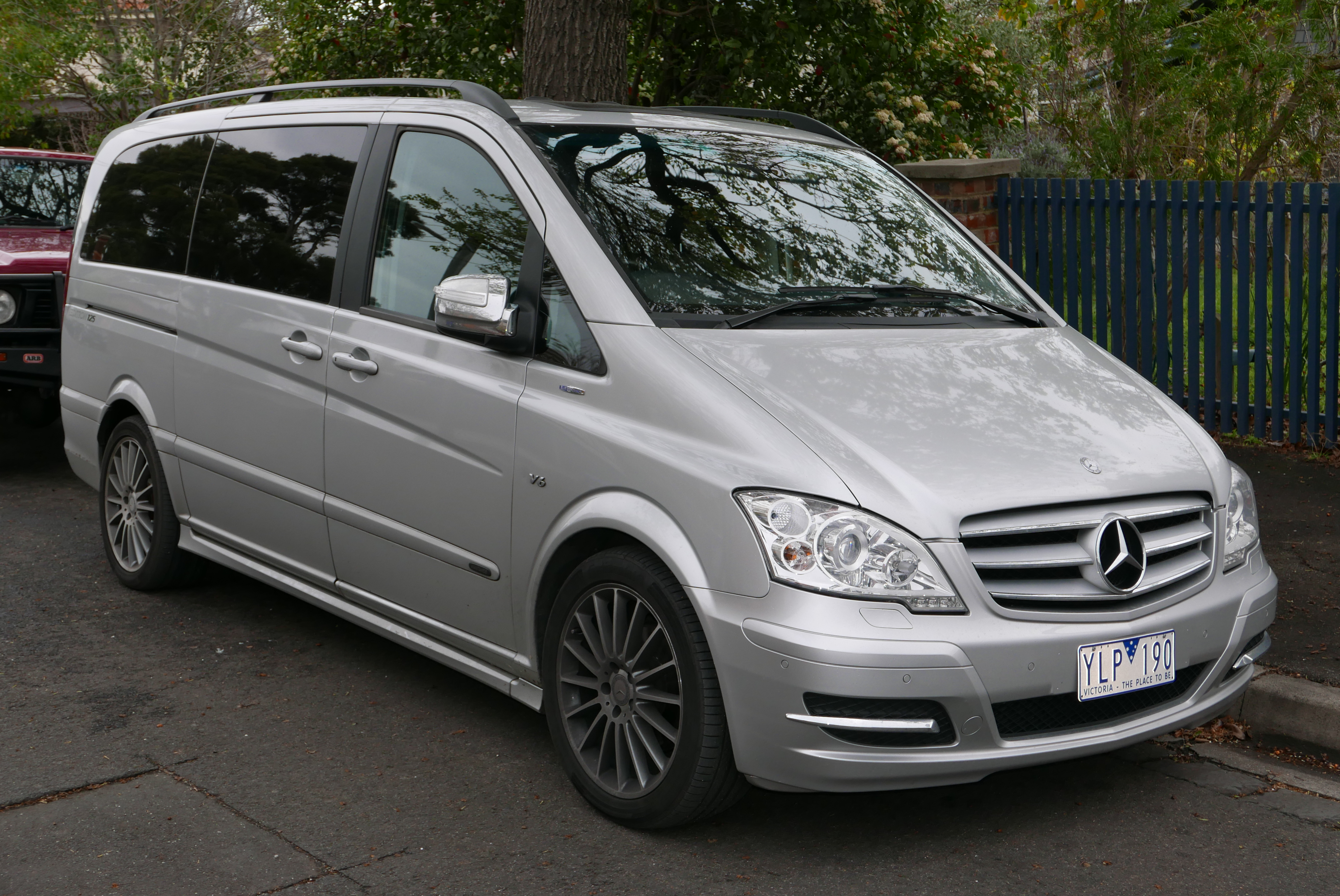
Front (Viano long, still SWB)

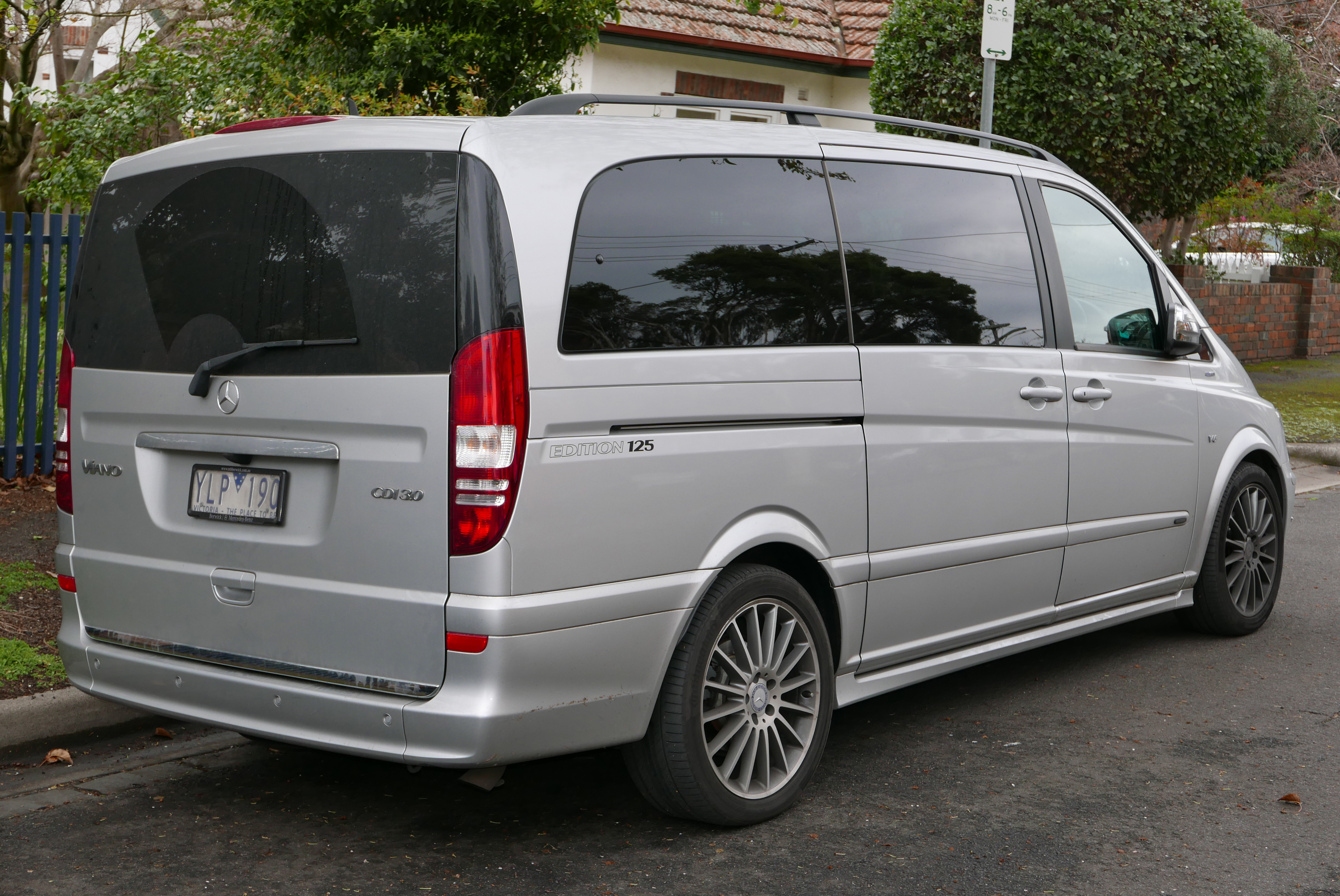
Rear (Viano long, still SWB)

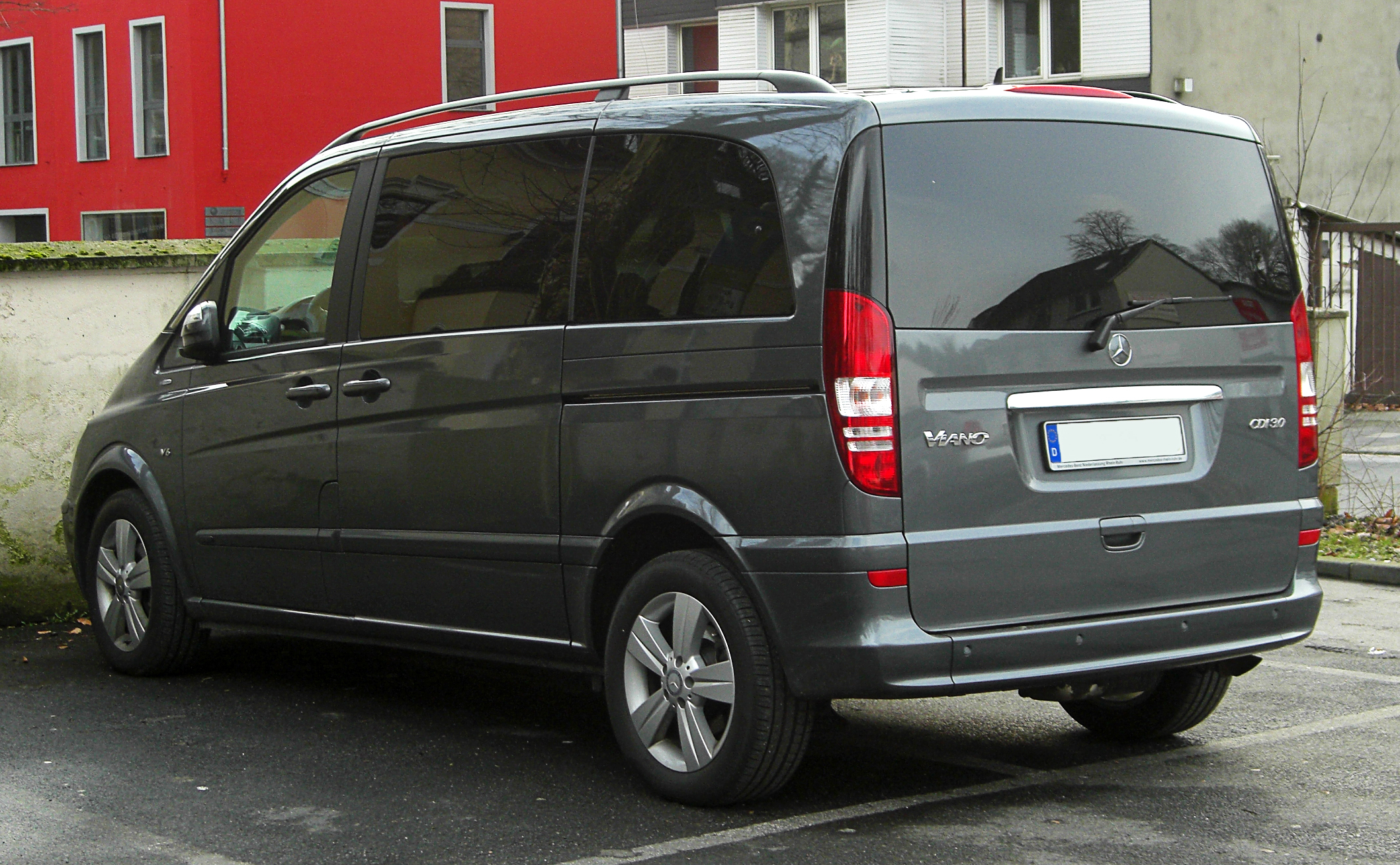
Rear (Viano short)

==== Vito ====
The facelifted version of the Vito began from September 2010, and features restyled front and rear lights, restyled front bumpers, and more-efficient diesel engines adapted from the Mercedes-Benz Sprinter range. The Vito's suspension, instrumentation, steering wheel, and overall quality of materials was also improved.

Early models included Vito 110 CDI, Vito 113 CDI, Vito 116 CDI, Vito 122 CDI, Vito 126, with 3 body lengths (compact, long, extra-long).

Pre-facelift

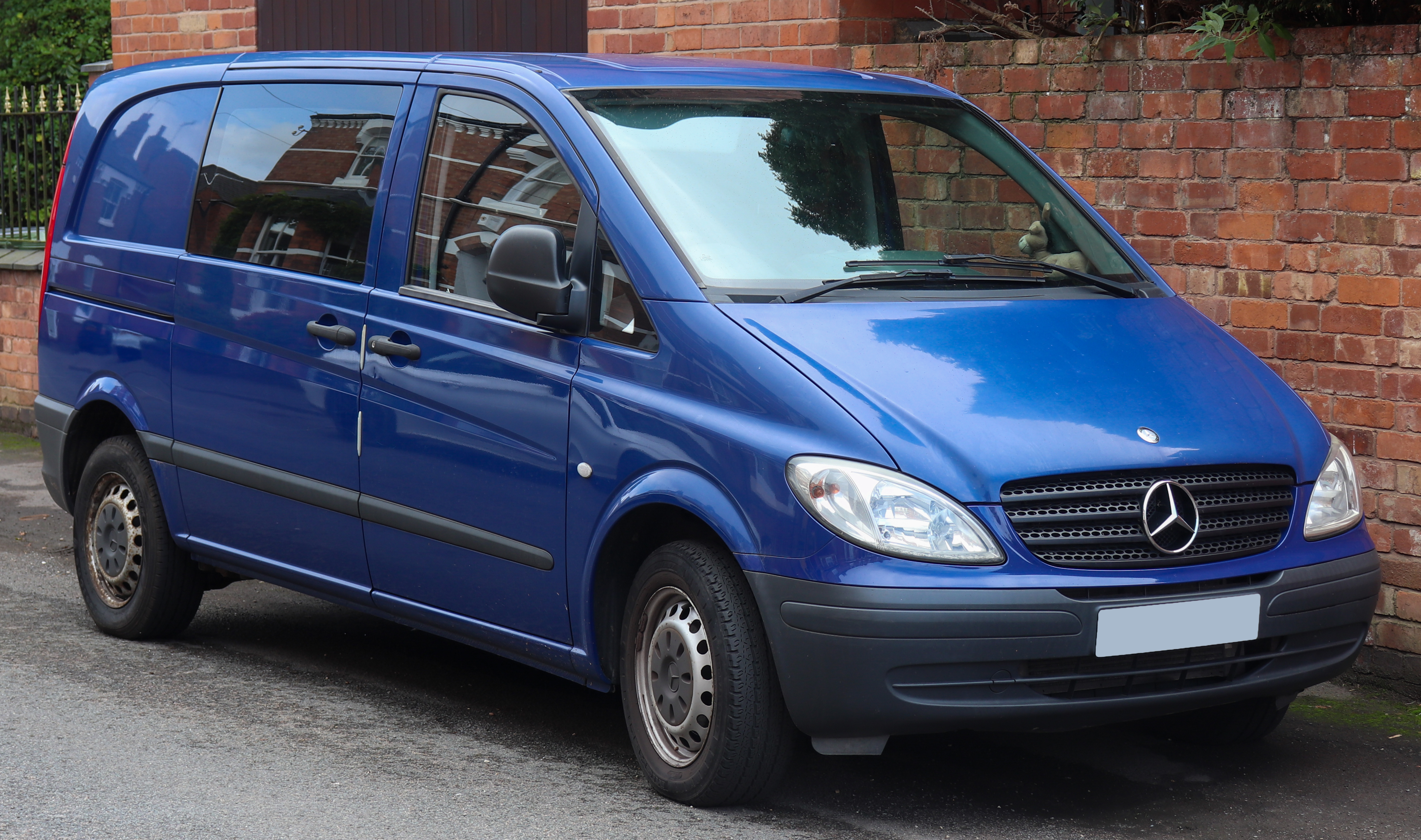
Front (Vito)

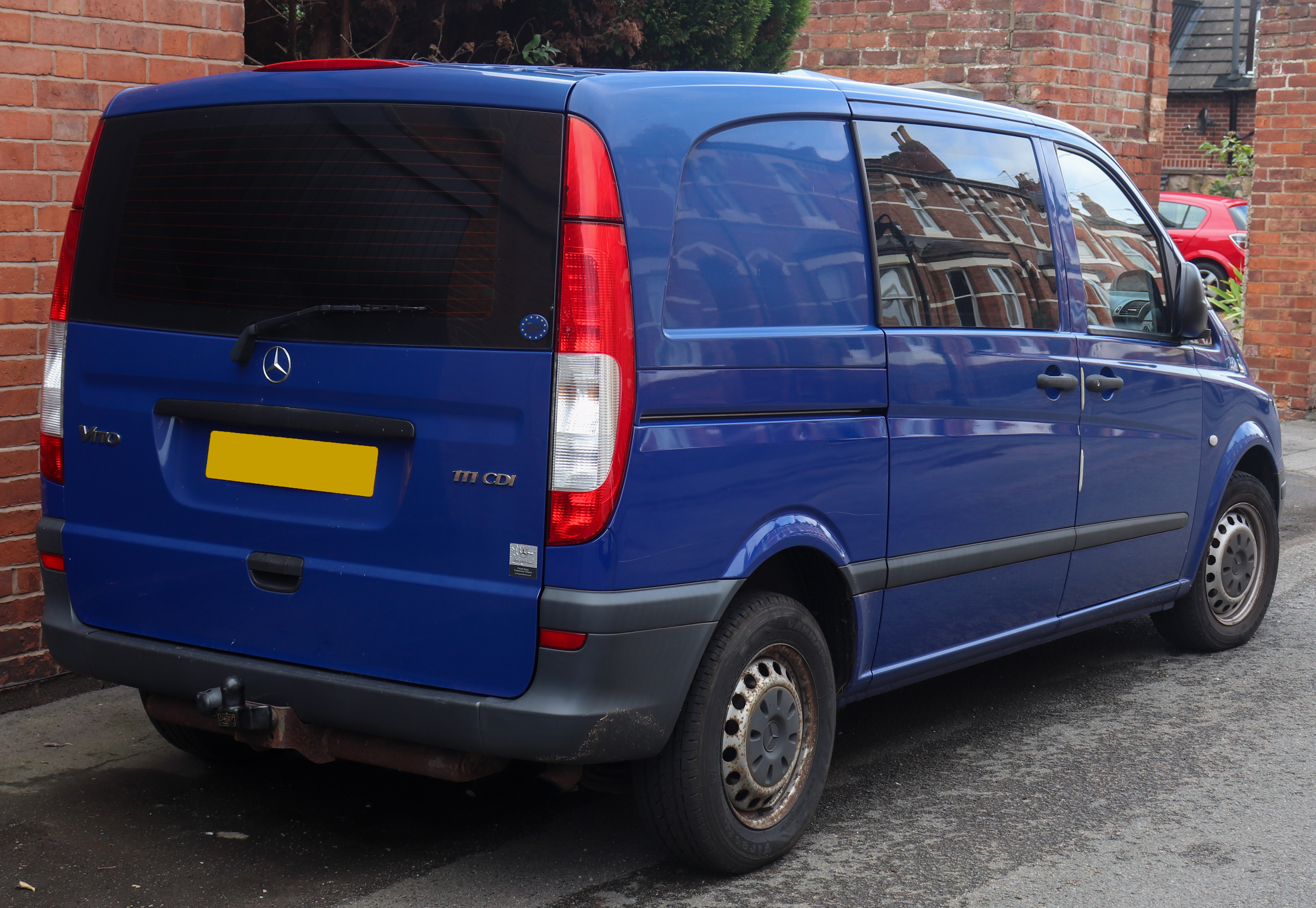
Rear (Vito)

Facelift

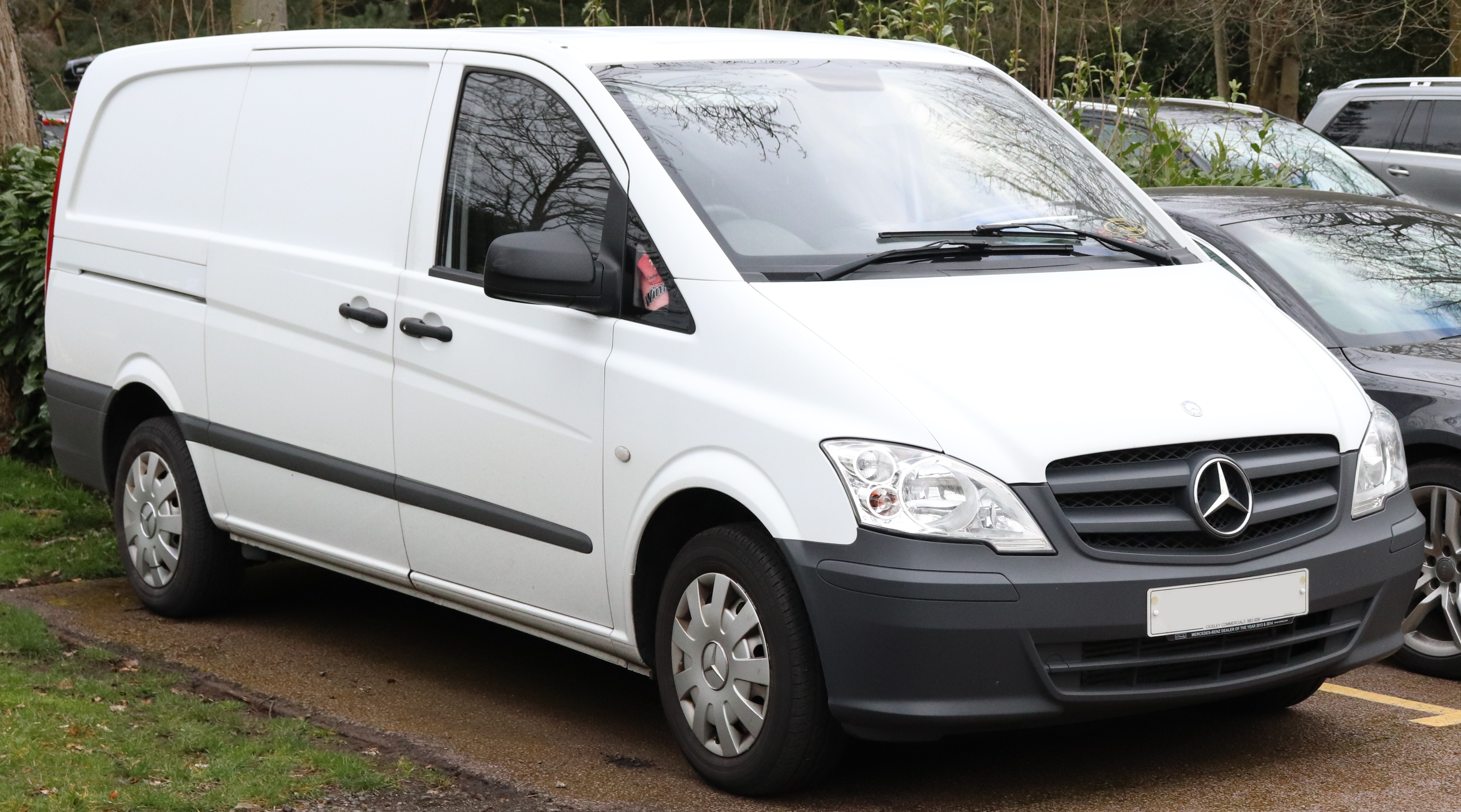
Front (Vito)

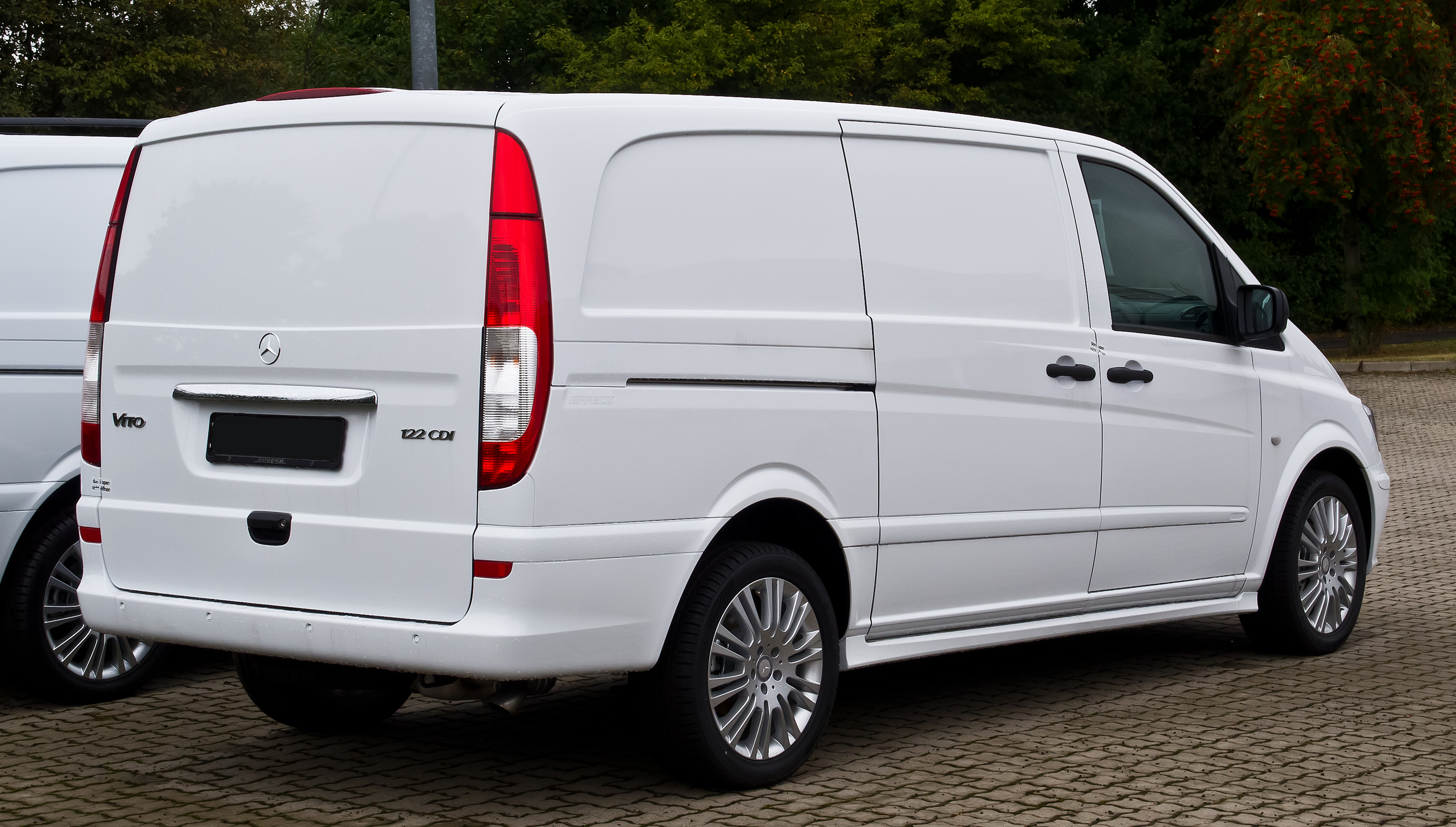
Rear (Vito)

==== Vito E-CELL (2010–2012) ====
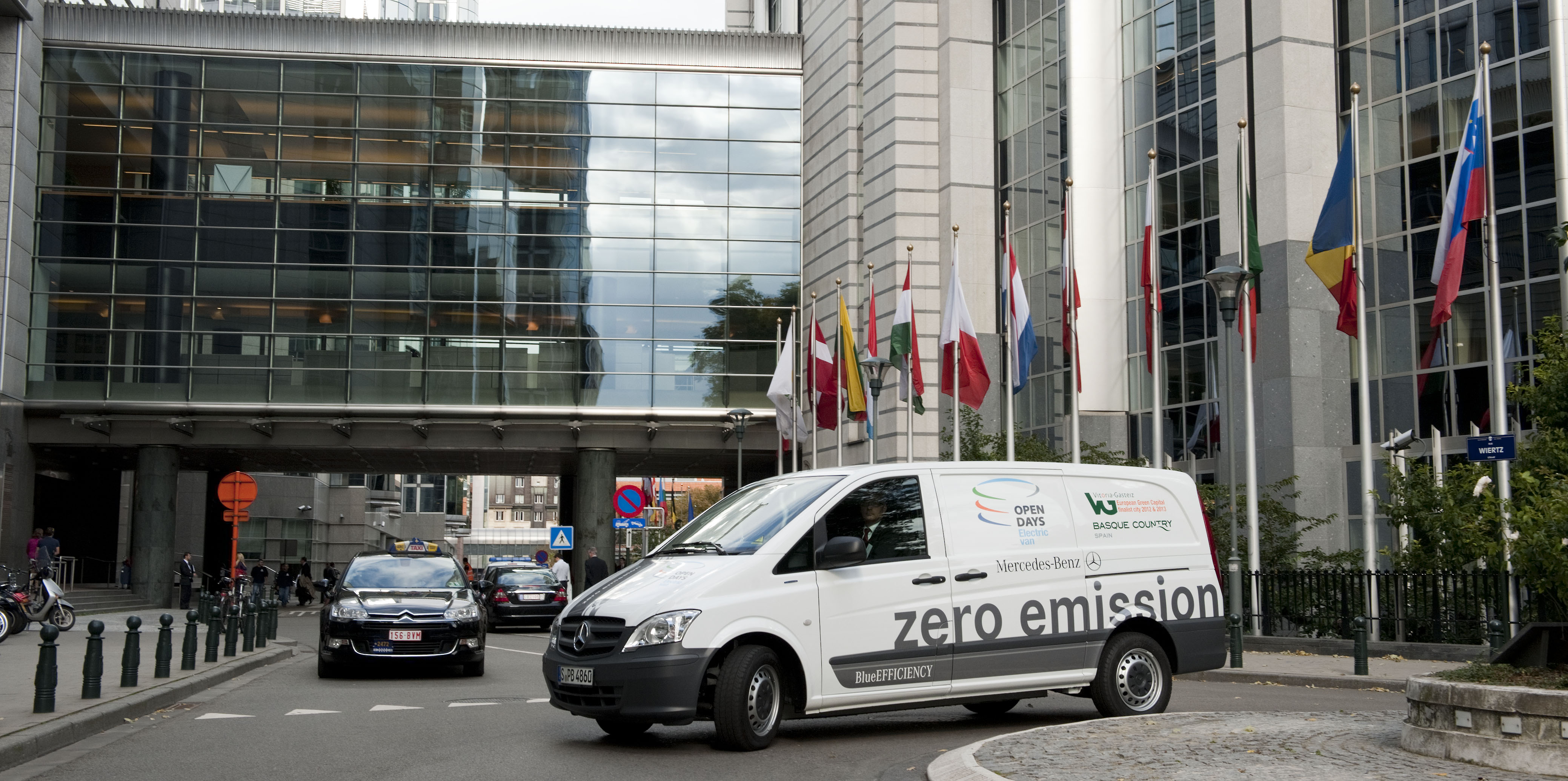
Presentation of the 'Mercedes-Benz Vito E-Cell' at the headquarters of the European Committee of the Regions, during Open Days (Brussels, 5 October 2010)

Overview

Earlier limited-production and prototype Mercedes-Benz efforts to provide battery-electric delivery vans included the 1972 LE 306; the T1-based 307 E (1980) and 308 E (1988); the MB100 E (1992); the Sprinter 308 E (1995); and the Vito 108 E (1996).

The E-Cell was unveiled in 2010 Post Expo, powered by a 36 kWh lithium-ion battery located in the underfloor unit, electric motor rated 81 PS (60 kW; 80 hp) and 280 N⋅m (207 lb⋅ft) of torque. In 2012 a seven-seater Vito E-Cell was unveiled at the 2012 Geneva Motor Show with the same powertrain. The Vito E-Cell was discontinued in 2012, with Mercedes-Benz citing low demand.

Production

The Vito E-Cell is the first electric vehicle mass-produced in Spain. It will be fabricated by Mercedes-Benz Spain, in the Vitoria-Gasteiz factory. Mercedes-Benz has chosen Vitoria as the exclusive fabrication site for the electric van; the E-Cell will be assembled alongside conventionally-powered Vito and Viano vans.

Mercedes-Benz expected 100 E-Cell vehicles to be produced by the end of 2010 and a further 2,000 by the end of 2011. The UK market was allocated 50 vehicles for the first year. All customers are to be vetted to ensure suitability and must return the van after four years to Mercedes. The first manufactured units (91 already) were presented on 7 February 2011. The goal is to produce 474 units by the end of the year. Most of them will be sold to foreign companies (mainly in Germany; Berlin and Stuttgart), though the Basque supermarket gamble Eroski has got four vans for distribution duties. Last year, the government made a plan in order to encourage this kind of cars. 590 million € will be funded, from which 7 have gone to the 'E-Cell' project. This project will also be supported by the Basque and German governments.

Drivetrain

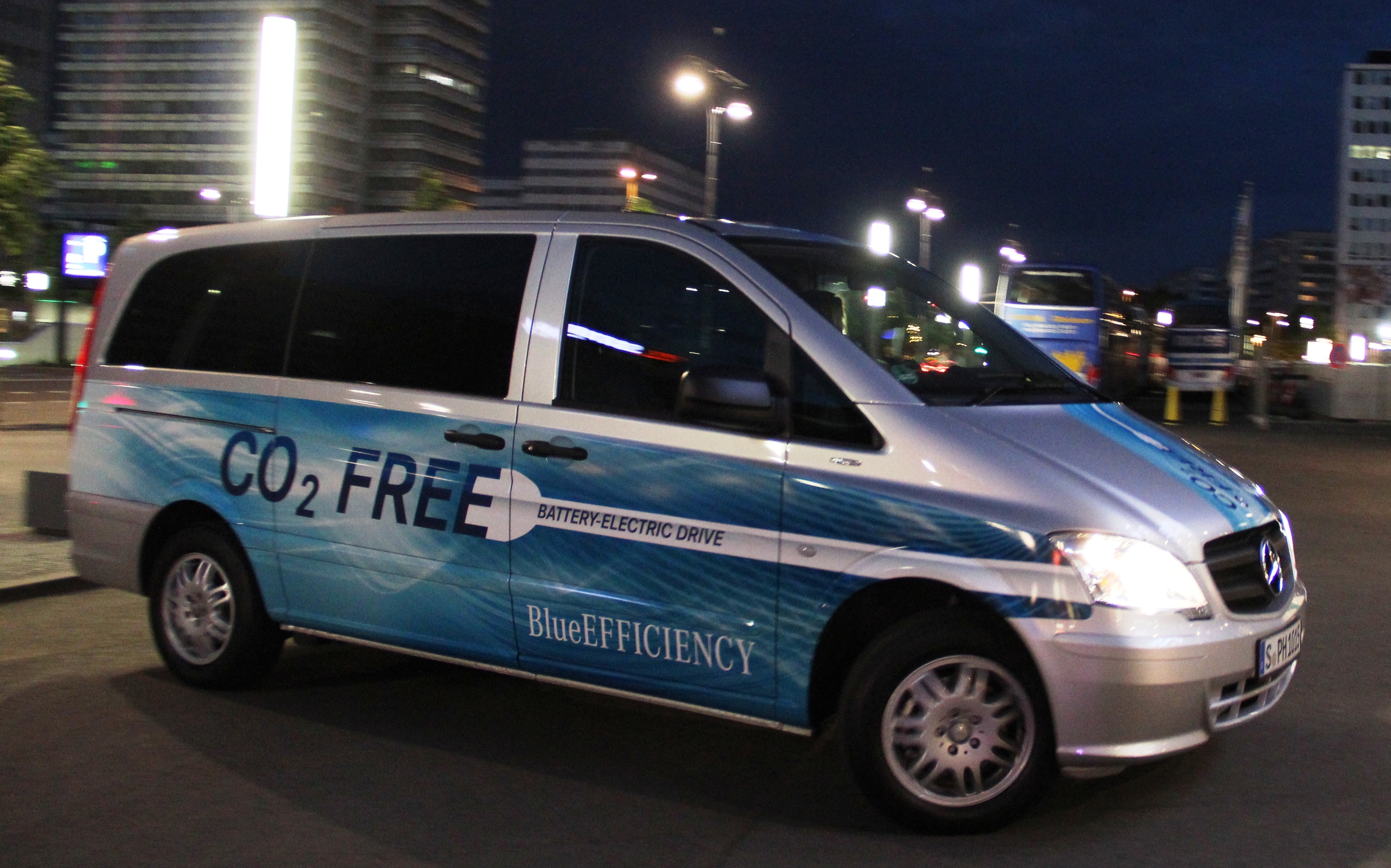
Vito E-CELL (2013)

The Vito E-Cell utilizes a unique front-wheel drive setup to save installation space for the 36-kWh lithium-ion battery pack housed underneath the van's cargo area. The electric traction motor is a permanent synchronous magnet drive with a constant power of 60 kW (80 hp; 82 PS) and a maximum power of 70 kW (94 hp; 95 PS). The top speed is limited to 80 km/h (50 mph), and it has a maximum torque of 280 N⋅m (207 lb⋅ft) instantly available, which gives the van a similar dynamic performance to one equipped with a modern diesel engine.

Energy to move the van is stored in an electric battery. This battery is placed under the chassis (where the petrol tank and the prop-shaft are normally), while the electric traction motor, the transformer, and the charger are located in the engine's usual position, under the hood. The traction battery is split into 16 modules with 192 cells in all, with high energy density and a rated voltage of 360 volts. Gross battery capacity is 36 kWh, 32 kWh of which are available for the vehicle operation. The batteries weigh 550 kg (1,213 lb); their life is unknown. They are supplied by the company Magna, and they give the Vito E-Cell an estimated maximum range of 130 km (81 mi), but this can be reduced by the weather conditions, the ground's topography or even the cargo volume. It is considered that a range between 90 and 100 km (56 and 62 mi) could be more realistic. Either way, it is intended to be enough for a workday in urban delivery.

The E-Cell is equipped with an onboard charger that has a maximum power input rate of 6.1 kW (AC); the total charge time is six hours through a high voltage connection (380 or 400 volts), but with a domestic 230 volt supply, the total charge time is double, about 12 hours. Moreover, Mercedes-Benz offers the vehicle as a lease (4 years / 80,000 km (50,000 mi)), making the manufacturer responsible for battery maintenance and replacement when necessary.

Chassis and capacities

The Vito E-Cell is based on the long-wheelbase version of the van, with a wheelbase of 3.2 m (10 ft), so that there is enough space for the batteries. With this aim of saving space, only the front-drive version is offered, unlike in the previous model, so a long development was needed, although some suspension components of the all-wheel drive version were adapted for the E-Cell.

The vehicle has a payload capacity of 900 kg (1,984 lb), and a permissible gross vehicle weight rating of 3,050 kg (6,720 lb).

Externally, the Vito E-Cell does not show external changes with the other versions, aside from the decorative elements: the body has not been modified, and both the double side door and the helpful back 'gate' remain as before. The refueling port has been reused for the vehicle charging inlet port.

The Vito E-Cell is equipped with complete and modern features, including a special heater connected to the high voltage network and to the basic heating system, which ensures pleasant conditions even in the coldest months. In terms of safety, the new Mercedes keeps the same level as the other Vito models. The vehicle has many of the electric drivetrain components carried under the front bonnet, so, if a collision occurs, the batteries are protected by a shock element. The active safety also makes that the high-technology voltage network turns off when the airbag control unit activates. The Vito E-Cell comes standard with the Electronic Stability Program (ESP) and dual airbags.

==== Engines ====
Petrol engines
Model	Years	Type/code	Power, torque/rpm
Viano 3.0	2010-	3,199 cc (195.2 cu in) V6 (M 112 E 32)	190 PS (140 kW; 187 hp) at 5600, 270 N⋅m (199 lbf⋅ft) at 2750-4750
Viano 3.5	2010-	3,498 cc (213.5 cu in) V6 (M 272 KE 35)	258 PS (190 kW; 254 hp) at 5900, 340 N⋅m (251 lbf⋅ft) at 2500-5000
Vito 119	2010-	3,199 cc (195.2 cu in) V6 (M 112 E 32)	190 PS (140 kW; 187 hp) at 5600, 270 N⋅m (199 lbf⋅ft) at 2750-4750
Vito 126	2010-	3,498 cc (213.5 cu in) V6 (M 272 KE 35)	258 PS (190 kW; 254 hp) at 5900, 340 N⋅m (251 lbf⋅ft) at 2500-4000

Diesel engines
Model	Years	Type/code	Power, torque/rpm
Viano 2.0 CDI	2010-	2,143 cc (130.8 cu in) I4 two-stage turbo (OM 651 DE 22 LA red.)	136 PS (100 kW; 134 hp) at 3800, 310 N⋅m (229 lb⋅ft) at 1400-2600
Viano 2.0 CDI BlueEFFICIENCY	2010-	2,143 cc (130.8 cu in) I4 two-stage turbo (OM 651 DE 22 LA red.)	136 PS (100 kW; 134 hp) at 2800–3000, 360 N⋅m (266 lb⋅ft) at 1600-2600
Viano 2.0 CDI 4MATIC	2010-	2,143 cc (130.8 cu in) I4 two-stage turbo (OM 651 DE 22 LA red.)	136 PS (100 kW; 134 hp) at 3800, 310 N⋅m (229 lb⋅ft) at 1400-2600
Viano 2.0 CDI BlueEFFICIENCY 4MATIC	2010-	2,143 cc (130.8 cu in) I4 two-stage turbo (OM 651 DE 22 LA red.)	136 PS (100 kW; 134 hp) at 2800–3000, 360 N⋅m (266 lb⋅ft) at 1600-2600
Viano 2.2 CDI	2010-	2,143 cc (130.8 cu in) I4 two-stage turbo (OM 651 DE 22 LA)	163 PS (120 kW; 161 hp) at 3800, 360 N⋅m (266 lb⋅ft) at 1600-2400
Viano 2.2 CDI BlueEFFICIENCY	2010-	2,143 cc (130.8 cu in) I4 two-stage turbo (OM 651 DE 22 LA)	163 PS (120 kW; 161 hp) at 3800, 360 N⋅m (266 lb⋅ft) at 1400-2400
Viano 2.2 CDI 4MATIC	2010-	2,143 cc (130.8 cu in) I4 two-stage turbo (OM 651 DE 22 LA)	163 PS (120 kW; 161 hp) at 3800, 360 N⋅m (266 lb⋅ft) at 1600-2400
Viano 2.2 CDI BlueEFFICIENCY 4MATIC	2010-	2,143 cc (130.8 cu in) I4 two-stage turbo (OM 651 DE 22 LA)	163 PS (120 kW; 161 hp) at 3800, 360 N⋅m (266 lb⋅ft) at 1400-2400
Viano 3.0 CDI	2010-	2,987 cc (182.3 cu in) V6 turbo (OM 642 DE 30 LA)	224 PS (165 kW; 221 hp) at 3800, 440 N⋅m (325 lbf⋅ft) at 1800-2400
Viano 3.0 CDI BlueEFFICIENCY	2010-	2,987 cc (182.3 cu in) V6 turbo (OM 642 DE 30 LA)	224 PS (165 kW; 221 hp) at 3800, 510 N⋅m (376 lbf⋅ft) at 1600-2800
Vito 110 CDI	2010-	2,143 cc (130.8 cu in) I4 two-stage turbo (OM 651 DE 22 LA red.)	95 PS (70 kW; 94 hp) at 3800, 250 N⋅m (184 lbf⋅ft) at 1400-2400
Vito 110 CDI BlueEFFICIENCY	2010-	2,143 cc (130.8 cu in) I4 two-stage turbo (OM 651 DE 22 LA red.)	95 PS (70 kW; 94 hp) at 3800, 250 N⋅m (184 lbf⋅ft) at 1400-2400
Vito 113 CDI	2010-	2,143 cc (130.8 cu in) I4 two-stage turbo (OM 651 DE 22 LA red.)	136 PS (100 kW; 134 hp) at 3800, 310 N⋅m (229 lbf⋅ft) at 1400-2600
Vito 113 CDI BlueEFFICIENCY	2010-	2,143 cc (130.8 cu in) I4 two-stage turbo (OM 651 DE 22 LA red.)	136 PS (100 kW; 134 hp) at 3800, 310 N⋅m (229 lbf⋅ft) at 1400-2600
Vito 116 CDI	2010-	2,143 cc (130.8 cu in) I4 two-stage turbo (OM 651 DE 22 LA)	163 PS (120 kW; 161 hp) at 3800, 360 N⋅m (266 lbf⋅ft) at 1600-2400
Vito 116 CDI BlueEFFICIENCY	2010-	2,143 cc (130.8 cu in) I4 two-stage turbo (OM 651 DE 22 LA)	163 PS (120 kW; 161 hp) at 3800, 360 N⋅m (266 lbf⋅ft) at 1600-2400
Vito 120 CDI	2006-	2,987 cc (182.3 cu in) V6 turbo (OM 642 DE 30 LA)	224 PS (165 kW; 221 hp) at 3800, 440 N⋅m (325 lbf⋅ft) at 1400-2800
Vito 122 CDI	2010-	2,987 cc (182.3 cu in) V6 turbo (OM 642 DE 30 LA)	224 PS (165 kW; 221 hp) at 3800, 440 N⋅m (325 lbf⋅ft) at 1400-2800
Vito 122 CDI BlueEFFICIENCY	2010-	2,987 cc (182.3 cu in) V6 turbo (OM 642 DE 30 LA)	224 PS (165 kW; 221 hp) at 3800, 440 N⋅m (325 lbf⋅ft) at 1400-2800
Vito 204 Sports	2006-	2,987 cc (182.3 cu in) V6 turbo (OM 642 DE 30 LA)	224 PS (165 kW; 221 hp) at 3800, 440 N⋅m (325 lbf⋅ft) at 1400-2800

Electric
Model	Years	Type/code	Power, torque
Vito E-CELL	2010-	Electric motor ()	continuous: 81 PS (60 kW; 80 hp), 280 N⋅m (207 lb⋅ft) maximum: 95 PS (70 kW; 94 hp)

Beginning with September 2011, BlueEFFICIENCY models of Viano and Vito include a new generator management system converts part of the kinetic energy produced into electric energy, which is then stored in the battery.

==== Transmissions ====
Petrol engines
Model	Years	Types
Viano 3.0	2010-	?
Viano 3.5	2010-	five-speed automatic

Diesel engines
Model	Years	Types
Viano 2.0 CDI	2010-	ECO Gear six-speed manual, five-speed automatic
Viano 2.0 CDI BlueEFFICIENCY	2010-	ECO Gear six-speed manual, five-speed automatic
Viano 2.0 CDI 4MATIC	2010-	five-speed automatic
Viano 2.0 CDI BlueEFFICIENCY 4MATIC	2010-	five-speed automatic
Viano 2.2 CDI	2010-	ECO Gear six-speed manual, five-speed automatic
Viano 2.2 CDI BlueEFFICIENCY	2010-	ECO Gear six-speed manual, five-speed automatic
Viano 2.2 CDI 4MATIC	2010-	five-speed automatic
Viano 2.2 CDI BlueEFFICIENCY 4MATIC	2010-	five-speed automatic
Viano 3.0 CDI	2010-	five-speed automatic
Viano 3.0 CDI BlueEFFICIENCY	2010-	five-speed automatic

==== Performance ====
Diesel engines
Model	Years	top speed	acceleration (s)	fuel economy	emission (g/km)
Viano 2.0 CDI	2010-	108 mph (174 km/h)	14.1	38.7 mpg_{‑imp} (7.30 L/100 km)	192
Viano 2.0 CDI TouchShift	2010-	107 mph (172 km/h)	13.1	34.5 mpg_{‑imp} (8.2 L/100 km)	216
Viano 2.2 CDI	2010-	117 mph (188 km/h)	12.1	38.7 mpg_{‑imp} (7.30 L/100 km)	192
Viano 2.2 CDI TouchShift	2010-	113 mph (182 km/h)	11.1	34.5 mpg_{‑imp} (8.2 L/100 km)	216
Viano 3.0 CDI TouchShift	2010-	125 mph (201 km/h)	9.1	32.8 mpg_{‑imp} (8.6 L/100 km)	226

All Viano and Vito engines conformed to Euro 5 emission standards.

==== Security ====
The Viano was tested by Thatcham's New Vehicle Security Ratings (NVSR) organisation and achieved the following ratings:

NVSR	Rating
Theft of car:	5/5 stars
Theft from car:	3/5 stars

==== Environmental impact ====
EcoTest analysed the emissions from the EU4-compliant 2.0 CDI 116 PS (85 kW; 114 hp) and 2.2 CDI 150 PS (110 kW; 148 hp) manuals and the EU5-compliant 2.2 CDI 163 PS (120 kW; 161 hp) TouchShift; the results are below:

(64/100)	2010 - on	2.2 CDI TouchShift	163 hp	Diesel

Next Green Car - an expert environmental organisation that analyses official vehicle emissions data rated the Viano. These Green Ratings (from 0 (cleanest) to 100 (dirtiest)) are listed below:

53	2010-on	2.0 CDI Manual	136 hp
53	2010-on	2.2 CDI Manual	163 hp
59	2010-on	2.0 CDI TouchShift	136 hp
59	2010-on	2.2 CDI TouchShift	163 hp
62	2010-on	3.0 CDI TouchShift	224 hp

=== 2013 update ===
During 2013 a number of special editions were launched; including the Grand Edition Viano launched at the Geneva Motor Show. Two special version for the Japanese markets were launched the V350 White Edition (50 units) and Black Edition (170 units) with additional equipment, large alloy wheels and leather interior.

Two updated camper vans were launched at the 2013 Caravan Salon; the Fun and Marco Polo.

==== Engines ====
Petrol engines
Model	Years	Type/code	Power, torque/rpm
Viano 3.0	2013-	3,199 cc (195.2 cu in) V6 (M 112 E 32)	190 PS (140 kW; 187 hp) at 5600, 270 N⋅m (199 lbf⋅ft) at 2750-4750
Viano 3.5	2013-	3,498 cc (213.5 cu in) V6 (M 272 KE 35)	258 PS (190 kW; 254 hp) at 5900, 340 N⋅m (251 lbf⋅ft) at 2500-5000

Diesel engines
Model	Years	Type/code	Power, torque/rpm
Viano 2.2 CDI	2013-	2,143 cc (130.8 cu in) I4 two-stage turbo (OM 651 DE 22 LA)	163 PS (120 kW; 161 hp) at 3800, 360 N⋅m (266 lbf⋅ft) at 1600-2400
Viano 3.0 CDI	2013-	2,987 cc (182.3 cu in) V6 turbo (OM 642 DE 30 LA)	224 PS (165 kW; 221 hp) at 3800, 440 N⋅m (325 lbf⋅ft) at 1400-2800

UK models included only 2.2 CDI (long/extra long), 3.0 CDI (long/extra long).

==== Transmissions ====
Petrol engines
Model	Years	Types
Viano 3.0	2013-	?
Viano 3.5	2013-	?

Diesel engines
Model	Years	Types
Viano 2.2 CDI	2013-	6-speed manual, 5-speed automatic
Viano 3.0 CDI	2013-	6-speed manual, 5-speed automatic

==== Production ====
As of 14 November 2013, Daimler's van joint venture Fujian Benz Automotive Co. (FBAC) has secured an order by the Dalian Wanda Group comprising 85 Mercedes-Benz Viano 3.0L vans.

=== Safety ===
Two head-on airbags and (on higher trim levels) front side airbags are fitted as standard, with front window airbags available as an option. Electronic stability control (ESP), traction control system (ASR), anti-lock braking system (ABS), electronic brakeforce distribution (EBV) and brake assist (BAS) are all fitted as standard. If BAS is activated, the hazard lights flash to warn following motorists that the Viano driver is undertaking an emergency braking manoeuvre.

Each seat is fitted with a three-point seatbelt with belt tensioner and force limiter and an adjustable head restraint.

The Viano underwent the Euro NCAP car safety tests in 2008 and achieved the following ratings:

Euro NCAP	Rating
Adult occupant:	4/5 stars
Child occupant:	3/5 stars
Pedestrian:	1/4 stars

The Australasian New Car Assessment Program (ANCAP) also tested the Viano and gave it a score of 32.66 points out of 37. It is the only van in Australasia to achieve the maximum five-star rating.

ANCAP test results* Mercedes-Benz Viano 4 cylinder variants with side curtain airbags (2008)
Test	Score
Overall	5 /5 stars
Frontal offset	12.79/16
Side impact	15.87/16
Pole	2/2
Seat belt reminders	2/3
Whiplash protection	Not Assessed
Pedestrian protection	Poor
Electronic stability control	Standard

ANCAP test results* Mercedes-Benz Vito (2009)
Test	Score
Overall	5 /5 stars
Frontal offset	12.79/16
Side impact	15.87/16
Pole	2/2
Seat belt reminders	2/3
Whiplash protection	Not Assessed
Pedestrian protection	Poor
Electronic stability control	Standard

ANCAP test results* Mercedes-Benz Valente 4 cylinder engine variants (2011)
Test	Score
Overall	5 /5 stars
Frontal offset	12.79/16
Side impact	15.87/16
Pole	2/2
Seat belt reminders	2/3
Whiplash protection	Not Assessed
Pedestrian protection	Poor
Electronic stability control	Standard

== Third generation (W447; 2014) ==
Mercedes-Benz W447
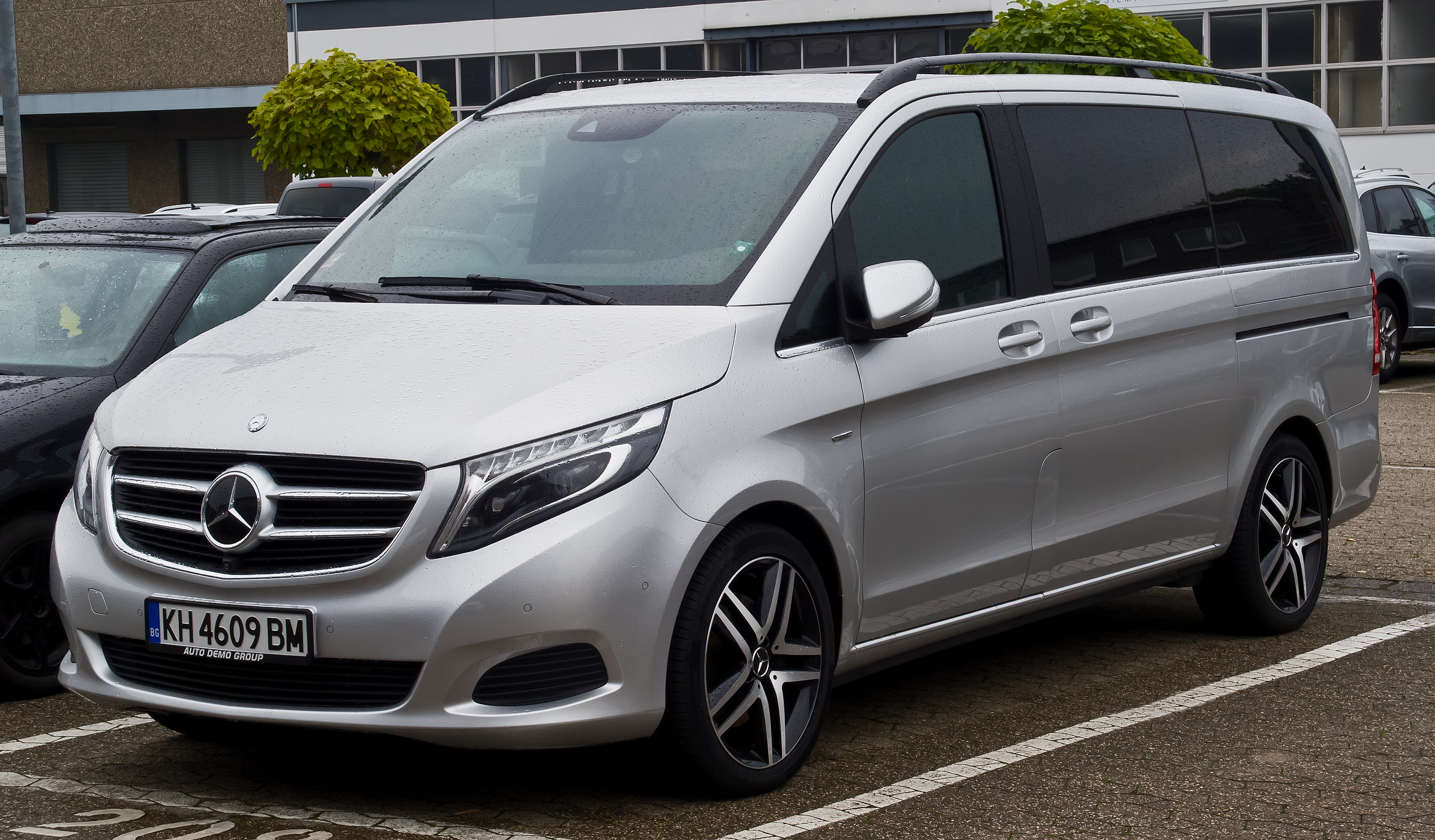

Overview
- Also called: Mercedes-Benz V-Class; Mercedes-Benz Marco Polo (camper models); Mercedes-Benz Metris (North American models); Mercedes-Benz EQV / e-Vito (electric models); Mercedes-Benz Valente
- Production: March 2014–present (Europe/Latin-America); March 2016–present (China, as V260); January 2016–2023 (North America, as Metris); 2019–present (India); 2020–present (e-Vito)
- Assembly: Spain: Vitoria-Gasteiz (Mercedes-Benz Espana, S.A.); Spain: Alcobendas (CKD); US: Ladson, South Carolina (Mercedes-Benz Vans, LLC); Mexico: Santiago Tianguistenco (Mercedes-Benz Mexico); Argentina: Virrey del Pino (Mercedes-Benz Argentina); China: Fuzhou (Fujian Daimler); India: Pune (Mercedes-Benz India)

Body and chassis
- Body style: 4-door van 4-door minibus
- Layout: FF Layout; Front motor, Front-wheel drive (EQV 300); FR Layout; F4 Layout
- Platform: Mercedes-Benz VS20

Powertrain
- Engine: petrol: 2.0 L M274 I4; diesel: 1.6 L OM 622 DE 16 LA turbo I4; 1.7 L OM 622 DE 17 LA turbo I4; 2.0 L OM 654 turbo I4; 2.2 L OM 651 DE 22 LA turbo I4; electric: EQV 300
- Electric motor: 85kW permanent synchronous magnet electric motor (eVito 2018-2020); 150kW permanent synchronous magnet electric motor (eVito 2025- and Mercedes-Benz EQV / eVito Tourer 2020-)
- Transmission: 6-speed ECO Gear manual; 7-speed 7G-Tronic Plus automatic; 9-speed 9G-Tronic automatic; Single speed with fixed ratio (Mercedes-Benz EQV / eVito Tourer)
- Battery: 90 (usable) kWh water-cooled Li-Ion battery 66/60 (total/usable) kWh Li-Ion battery
- Plug-in charging: 80 kW DC (eVito); 11 kW AC (eVito)

Dimensions
- Wheelbase: 3,200 mm (126.0 in) (SWB); 3,430 mm (135.0 in) (LWB)
- Length: 4,895 mm (192.7 in) (SWB L1); 5,140 mm (202.4 in) (SWB L2); 5,370 mm (211.4 in) (LWB)
- Width: 1,928 mm (75.9 in) (body only); 2,057 mm (81.0 in) (mirrors folded); 2,249 mm (88.5 in) (mirrors unfolded)
- Height: 1,901–1,908 mm (74.8–75.1 in)

=== Models ===
==== V-Class (W447) ====
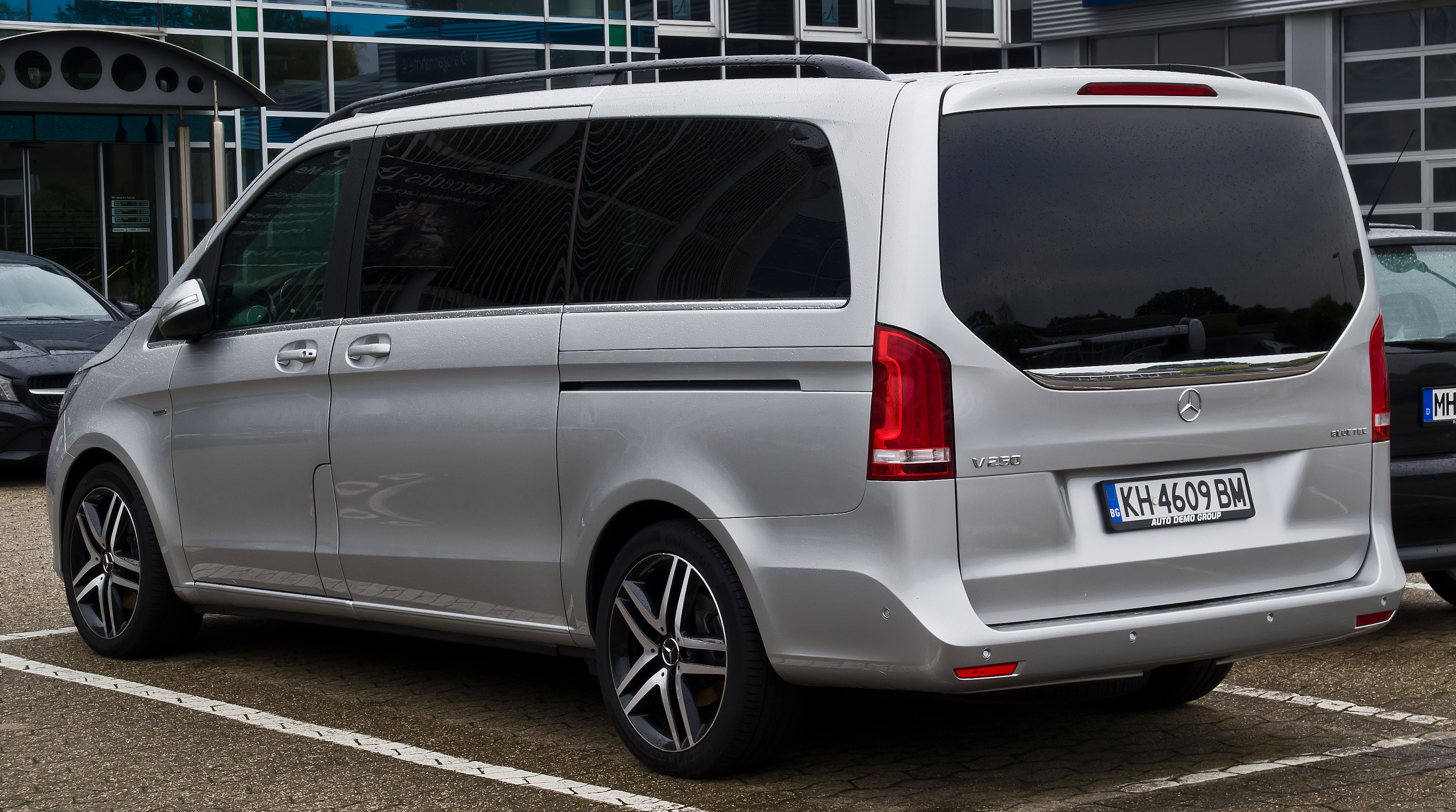
Rear view

Interior of a W447 V-Class with cream leather seating

The third generation V-Class was launched in 2014 as a full size MPV to replace the R-Class. However, it also was marketed as a successor to the Mercedes-Benz Viano. Sales commenced in Germany in May 2014, with European sales following in June.

The V-Class was a long-wheelbase model initially, with compact and extra-long variants due at a later date. A special launch model based on the V 250 BlueTEC is called Edition 1, and is fitted with a range of additional equipment including leather interior, Burmester sound system and large alloy wheels and Agility Control suspension system.

==== Vito (W447) ====
The Vito panel van variant was also released in 2014. Changes to Vito included standard Attention Assist and Crosswind Assist, optional Intelligent Light System (LED indicators, LED daytime running lamps, LED low-beam headlamps, main beam with cornering light function). The vehicle was unveiled in 2014 International Commercial Vehicles show.

An updated version was shown in 2020, with mild styling updates.

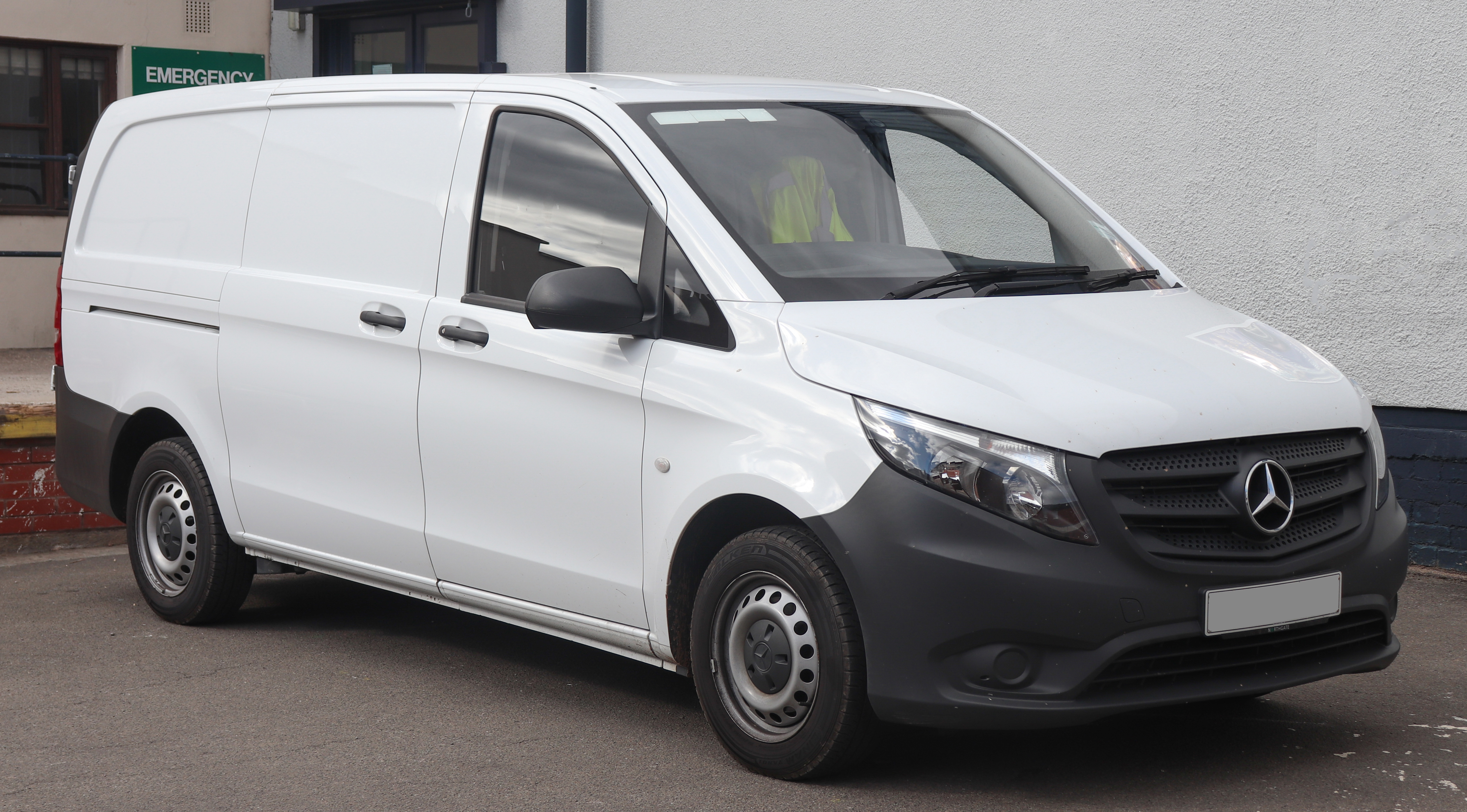
Front (pre-facelift; long-SWB)

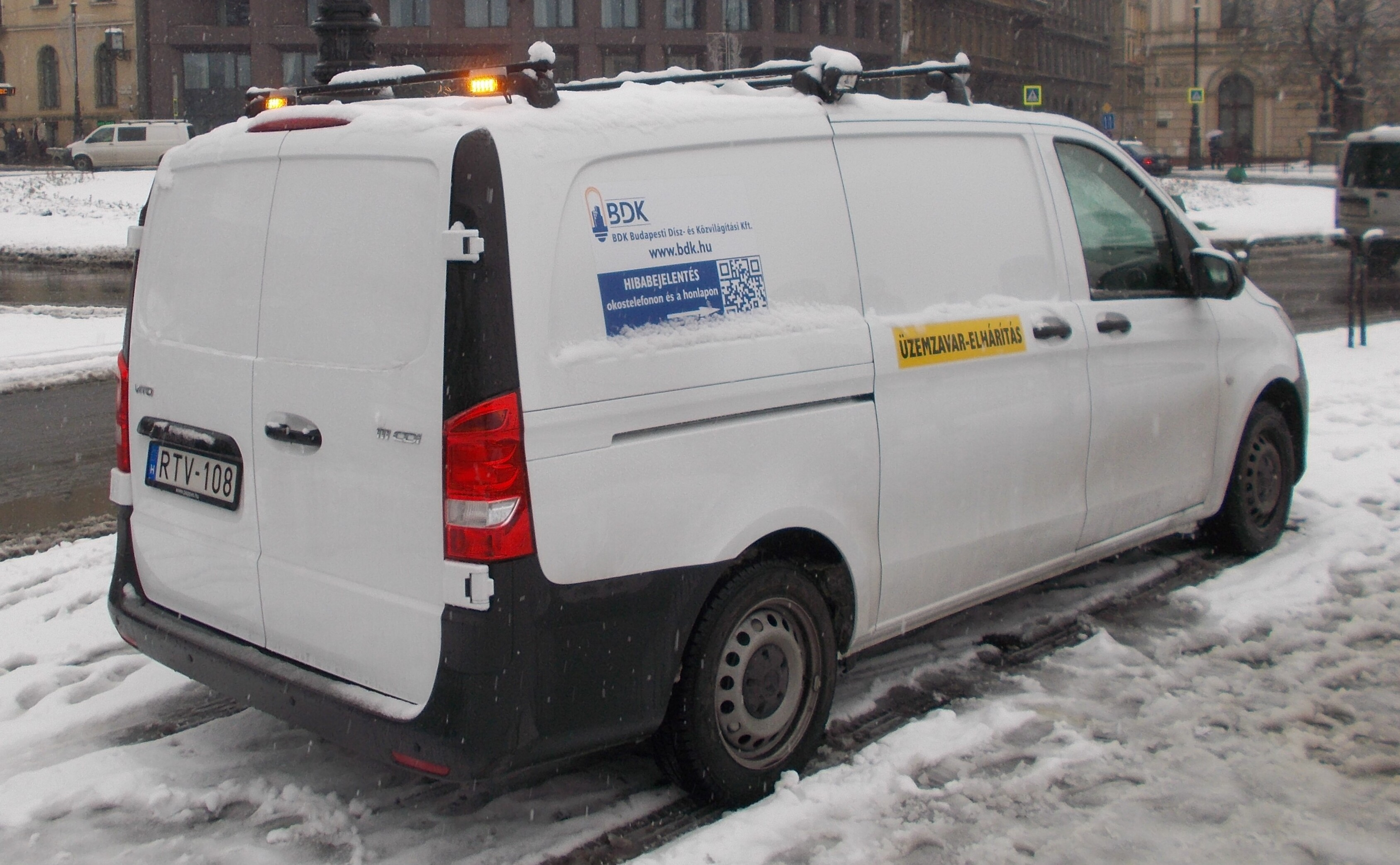
Rear (pre-facelift; long-SWB with barn doors)

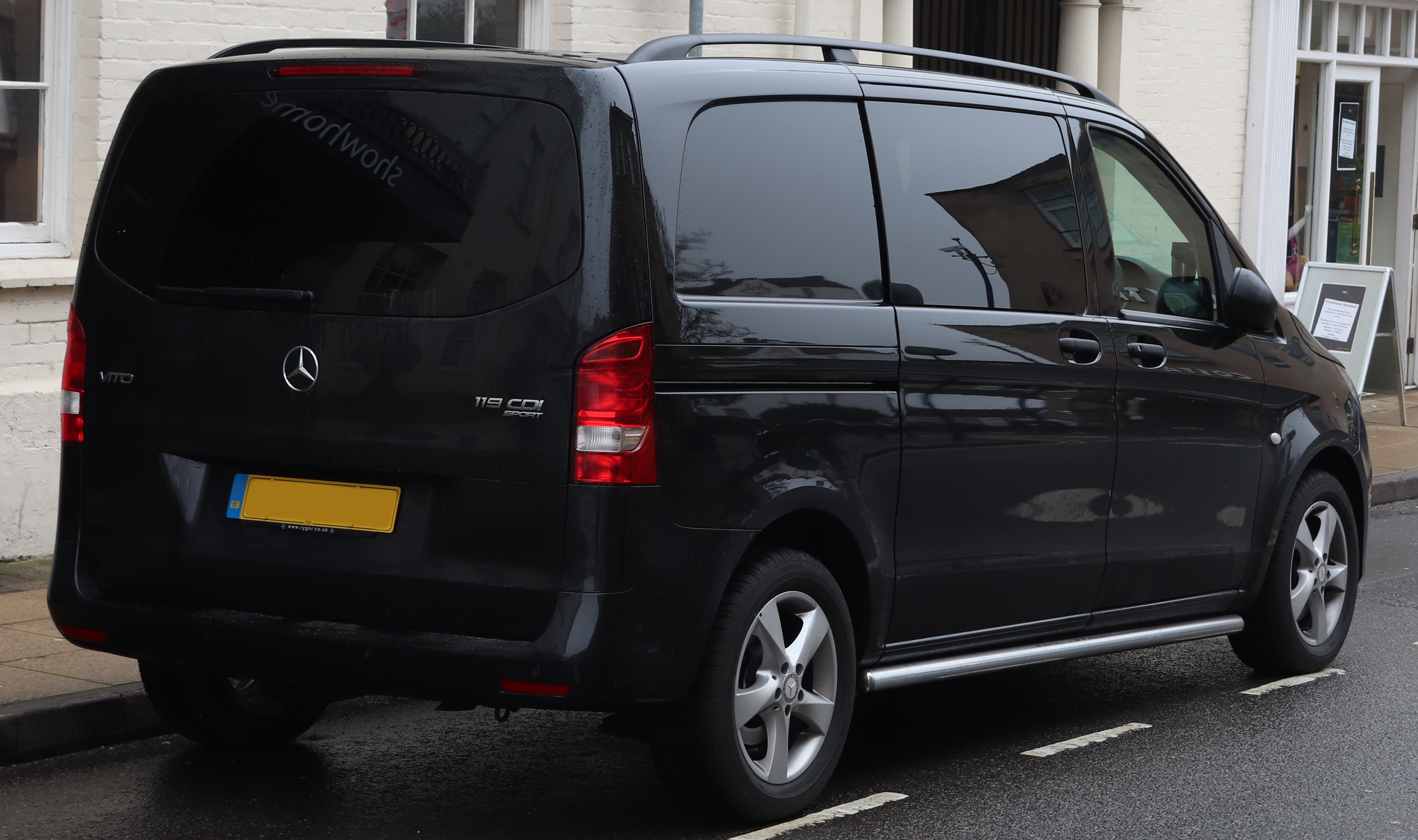
Rear (pre-facelift; short-SWB with lift-up tailgate)

==== Metris (North America) ====
Metris (North America)

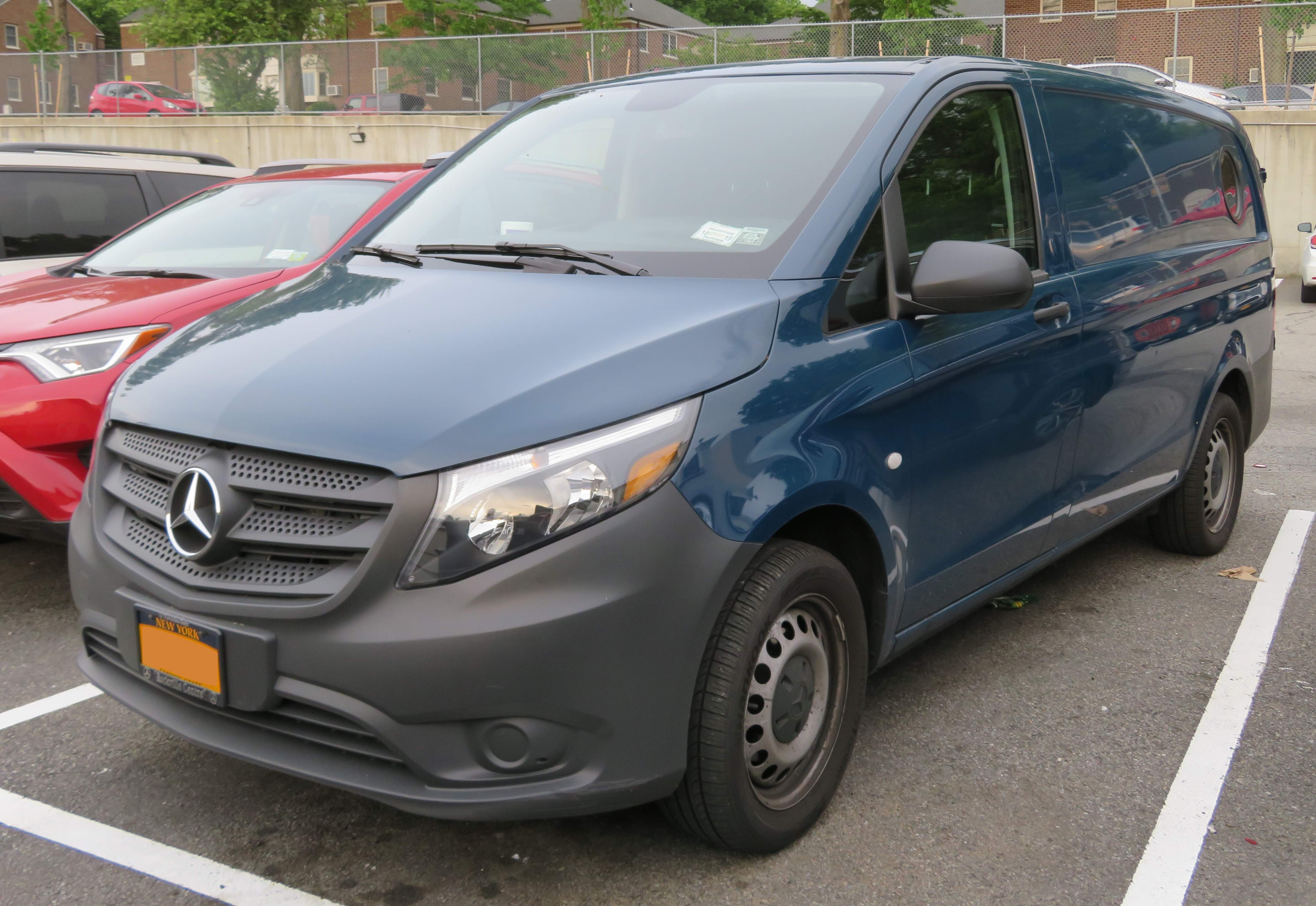
2017 Metris

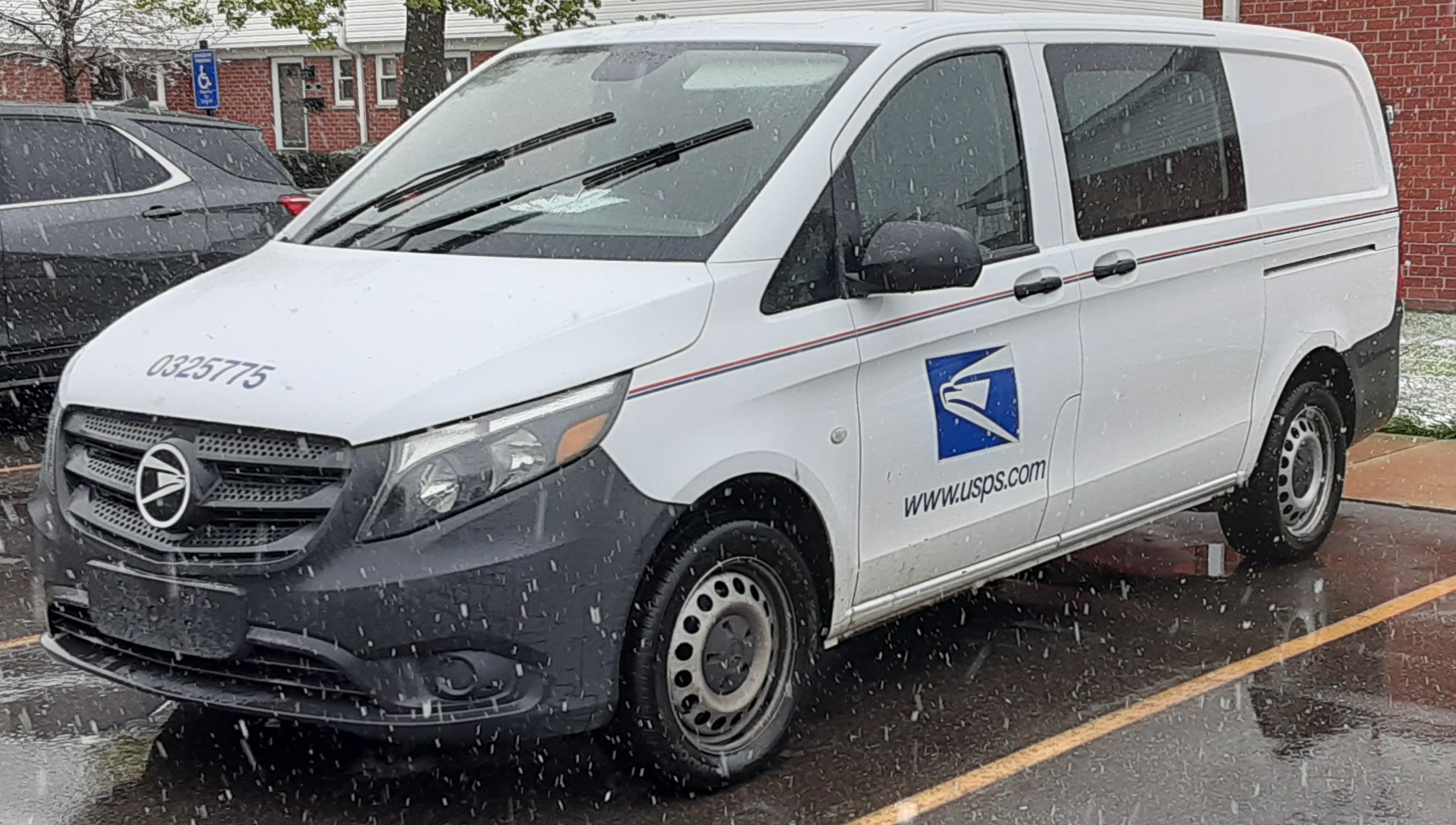
Metris USPS post van

The Vito also has been sold since 2015 in the United States and Canada as the Mercedes-Benz Metris; it was launched for the 2016 model year. At the time of its introduction it had the least expensive starting price for a new Mercedes-Benz model in the United States according to Car and Driver magazine, with the Metris starting at $29,945. The Metris is assembled alongside the North American Sprinter at the Mercedes-Benz Vans plant in Ladson, South Carolina. It is available in both passenger and cargo variants; however, the passenger version is intended for taxi and shuttle services, not as luxury transportation equivalent to the V-Class. For the North American market, the drivetrain is limited to a single choice: a 2.0 L turbocharged gasoline-fueled four-cylinder with a seven-speed automatic transmission.

The United States Postal Service purchased up to 30,000 right-hand drive Metris vans as part of the Commercial-Off-The-Shelf (COTS) vehicle program announced in 2018, to replace and upgrade its fleet of delivery vehicles.

The Mercedes-Benz Metris was discontinued after the 2023 model year in the U.S. and Canadian markets, due to poor sales and discontinuation of the exclusive gasoline engine that powers the North American Metris. The Vito will continue to be sold in markets outside the United States and Canada. The larger Sprinter will continue to be sold in the US and Canada beyond 2023 as the only commercial vehicle offered in these markets by Mercedes-Benz, with only diesel and all-electric powertrain options available.

==== EQV / eVito ====
===== Electric cargo van =====
The eVito, an electric panel van variant using the W447 chassis, was introduced in November 2017. Compared to the discontinued W639 Vito E-CELL, the W447 eVito had greater energy storage, 41.4 kWh, and greater range, at 150 km (93 mi). Net capacity was 35kWh, later increased to 60 or 66 kWh for the standard and 'medium' battery. The two longer wheelbase lengths were offered; because the eVito carries a gross vehicle weight rating (GVWR) of 3,200 kg (7,100 lb), the maximum payload is greater than the conventional Vito, which has a GVWR of 2,800 kg (6,200 lb).

As introduced, the eVito van was equipped with a 84 kW (113 hp) electric traction motor with maximum torque of 300 N⋅m (220 lbf⋅ft). Maximum speed was limited to 80 km/h (50 mph), but could be unlocked to 120 km/h (75 mph) via an option. The on-board charger had a maximum power input of 7.4 kW.

In March of 2025, Mercedes-Benz had introduced the 90 kWh eVito in addition to the standard 60 kWh battery, with an increased range of 480 km (300 mi) compared to the initial 35 kWh battery's 150 km (93 mi) and the refreshed 60 kWh battery's 260 km (160 mi).

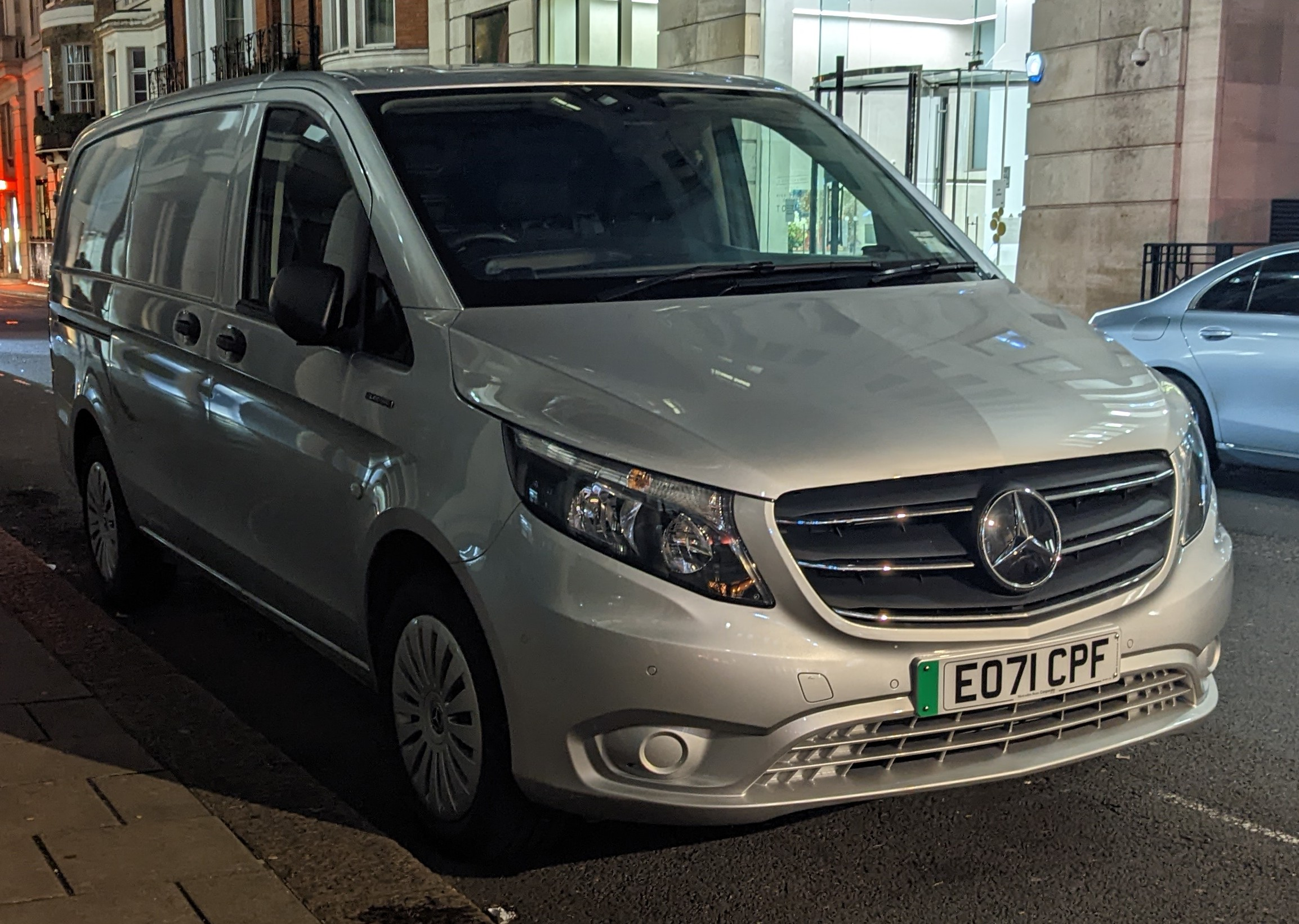
Front (eVito)

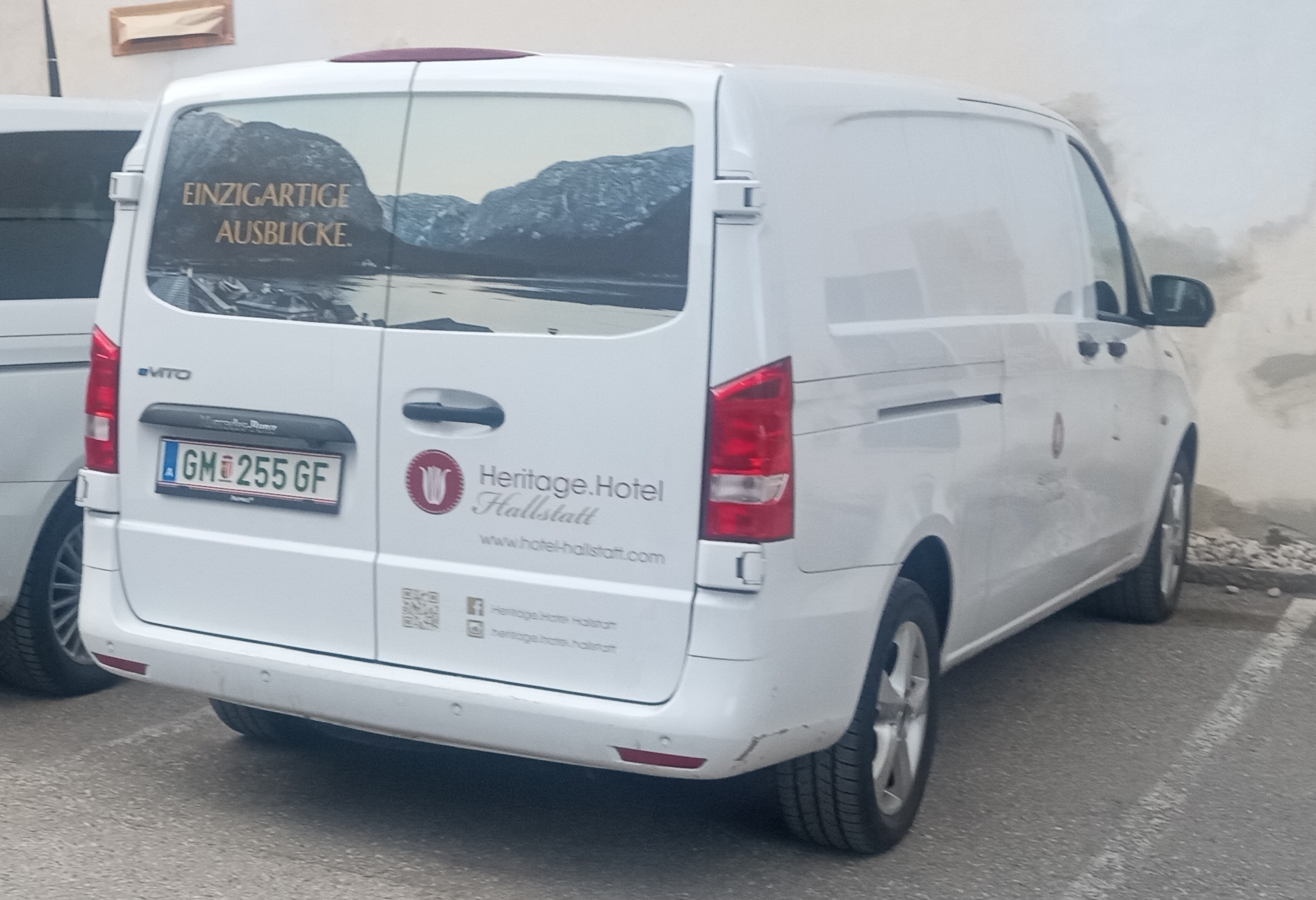
Rear (eVito)

===== Electric passenger vans =====
Two variants of the passenger van version are offered: The eVito Tourer and the more upmarket Mercedes-Benz EQV (an electric variant of the V-Class). The EQV was unveiled as a concept at the March 2019 Geneva Motor Show with a more powerful drivetrain and a more capacious battery than the eVito offered at the time. A production prototype was shown that August. The EQV is equipped with a battery that has a gross/usable capacity of 100/90 kW-hr and on-board charging that accepts up to 11 kW (AC). The 150 kW (201 hp) electric traction motor has a torque output of 362 N⋅m (267 lbf⋅ft); estimated energy consumption is 20.8–19.7 kWh/100 km (0.335–0.317 kW⋅h/mi; 101–106 mpg‑e). Top speed of the EQV is 160 km/h (99 mph). The tested range was 350 km (220 mi) on the WLTP cycle, with an observed consumption of 26.3 kWh/100 km (0.423 kW⋅h/mi; 80 mpg‑e).

An updated eVito Tourer was unveiled in 2020 with the same drivetrain as the EQV. The same battery of usable capacity of 90 kWh is available on the eVito Tourer and on the EQV. According to Mercedes, this translates into a range of 421 km (262 mi) in the case on the eVito Tourer; the top speed is now 160 km/h (99 mph).

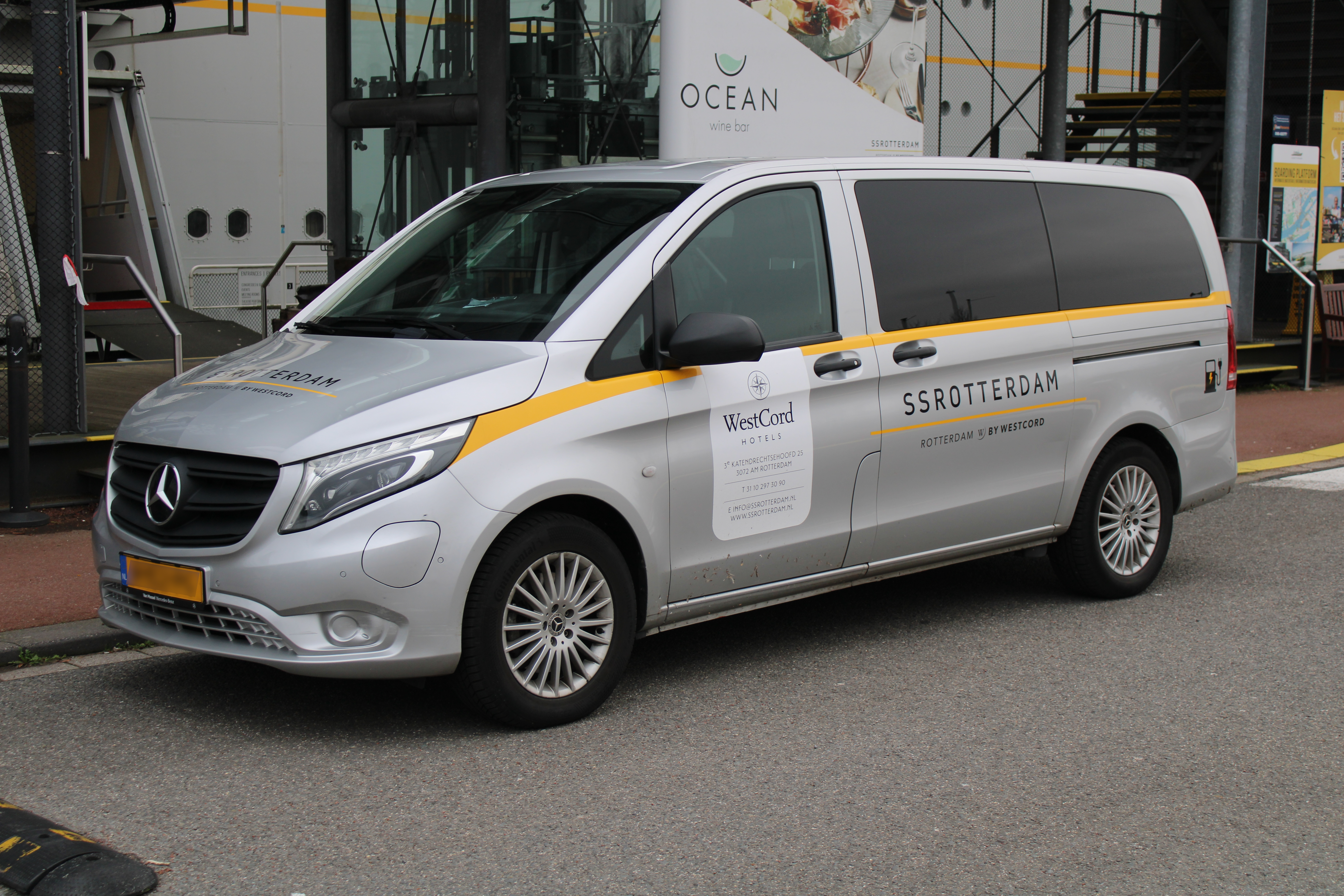
Front (eVito Tourer)

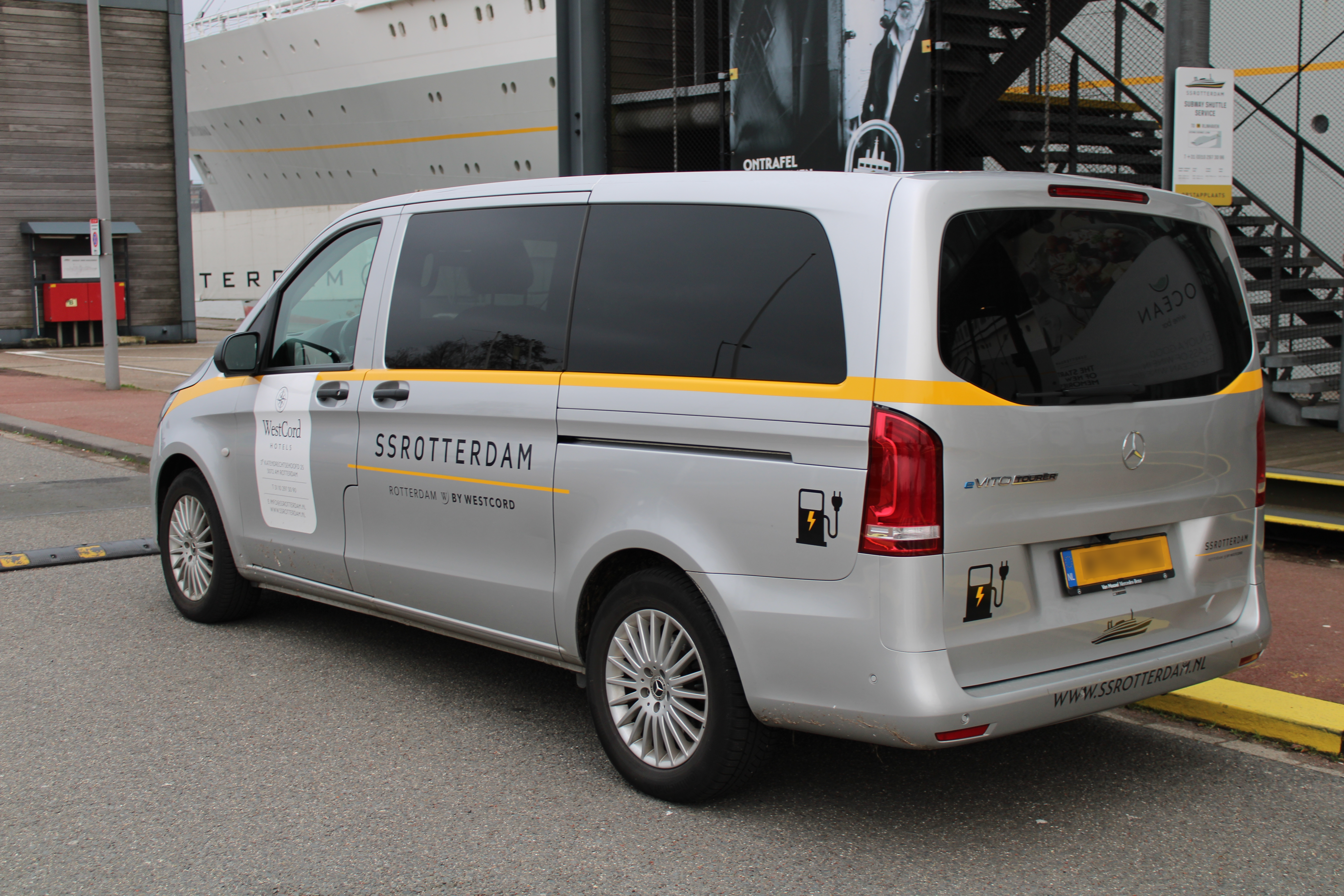
Rear (eVito Tourer)

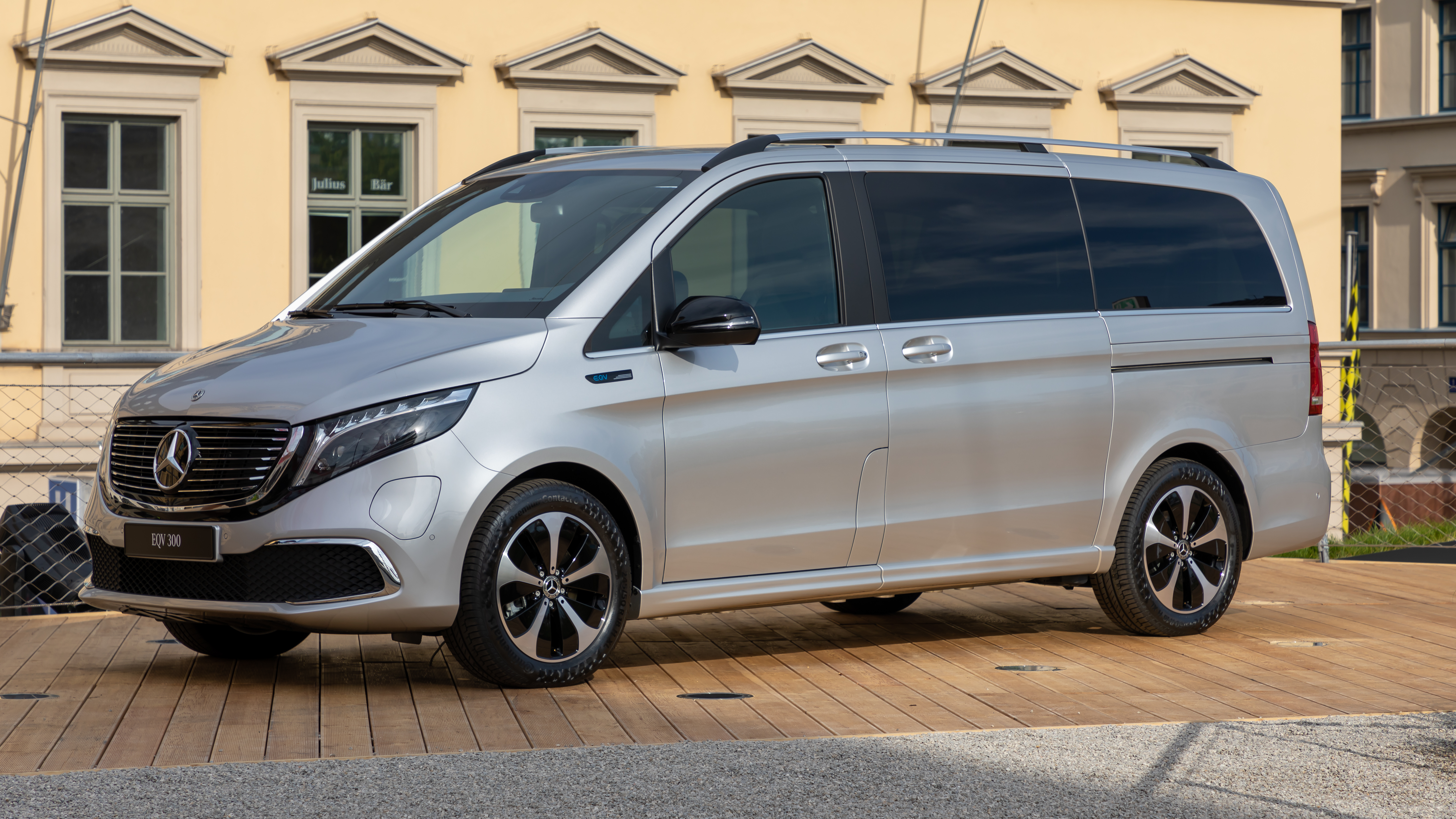
Front (EQV)

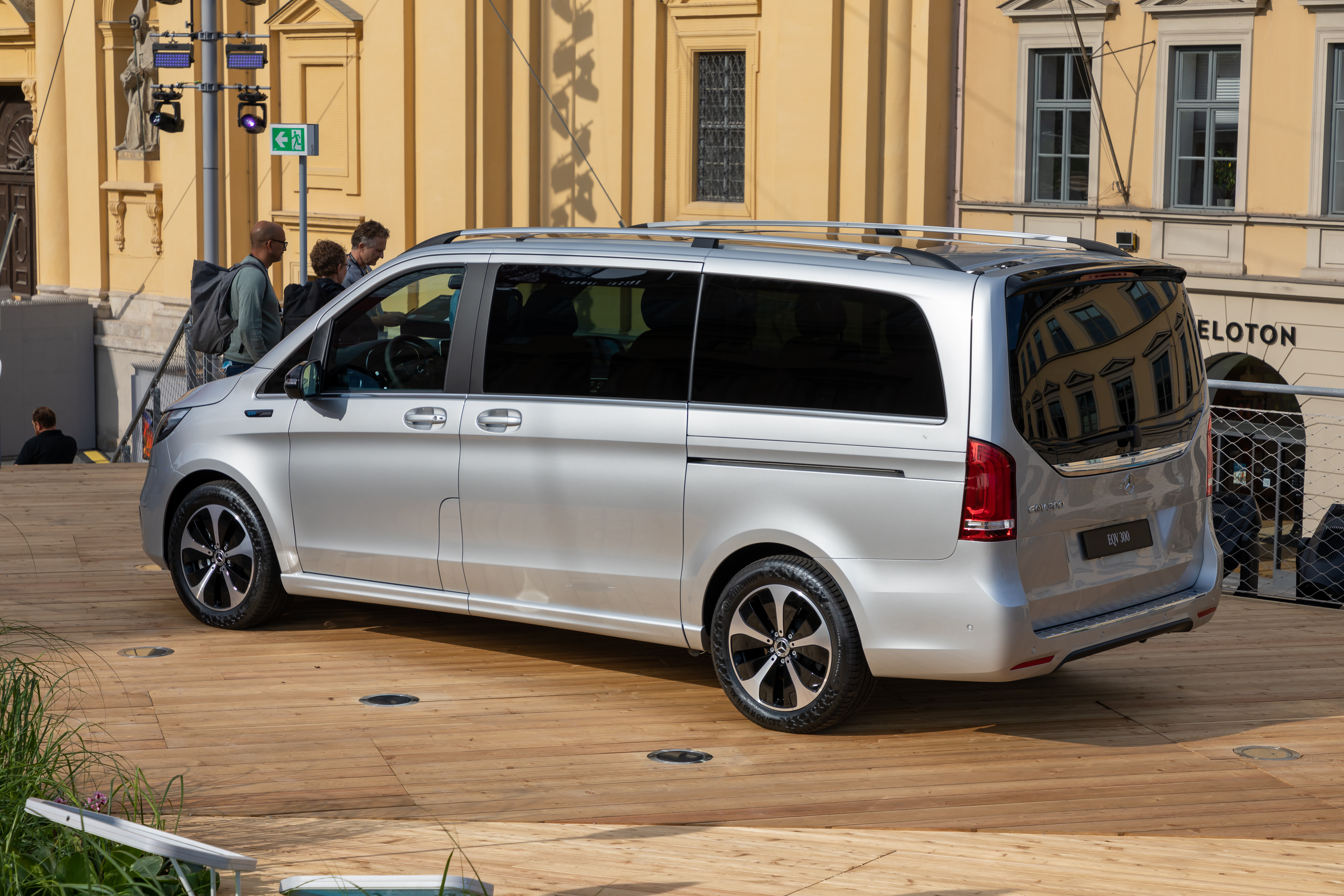
Rear (EQV)

=== Production ===
Production of V-Class in Vitoria, Spain plant began in March 2014, followed by Mercedes-Benz Vito in autumn 2014. Also, it started production in Argentina and production at the Fujian Daimler plant in Fuzhou, China started in March 2016.

The one petrol engine on offer is only sold in certain markets: in USA and Canada as the Metris, and in China and Indonesia as the Mercedes-Benz V260.

=== Facelift ===
Presented on 27 July 2023 was the revised W447 V-Class. For the 2024 model year, the new front fascia adds a larger radiator grille, surrounded by an LED light band, initially introduced onto the W214. The facelift also comes with multi-beam headlights, while the Mercedes-Benz logo is mounted onto the bonnet. Prominent Mercedes-Benz lettering has been added, as well as five new colour options. New wheel designs, which feature the aerodynamically optimised 17-, 18-, and 19-inch wheels are available. The interior introduces a new instrument panel and a new touchscreen running the newest Mercedes-Benz User Experience (MBUX) system. The new EQV and V-Class models feature dual 12.3-inch widescreen displays, while the Vito and eVito models both come with a 10.25-inch central touchscreen, as well as a new instrument cluster that features a new 5.5-inch display, positioned between the speedometer and the tachometer. The new infotainment system features music streaming, navigation with augmented reality, and the new "Hey Mercedes" on-board assistant.

Unlike the previous models, the EQV and V-Class minivans both feature sliding doors on both side, while models with automatic transmissions feature an electronic parking brake as standard. KEYLESS-GO which comes with a keyless entry and start is available, as well as other features such as Wireless smartphone charging, automatically dimming rear cabin lighting for trips at night, and 64-colour ambient interior lighting are available as additional luxuries. The MBUX system can also monitor other features of the vehicle. For example, if there's a refrigerated cargo space behind the cabin, the systems ensure the driver area stays at an optimized temperature. New safety systems, including driver drowsiness detection, automatic headlights, active cruise control and updated autonomous emergency braking with cross traffic assist. The V-Class features semi-autonomous cruise, as well as an auto-park function that features a 360-degree camera. Blind spot assist, lane keeping assist, a reversing camera and Intelligent Speed assist available safety systems.

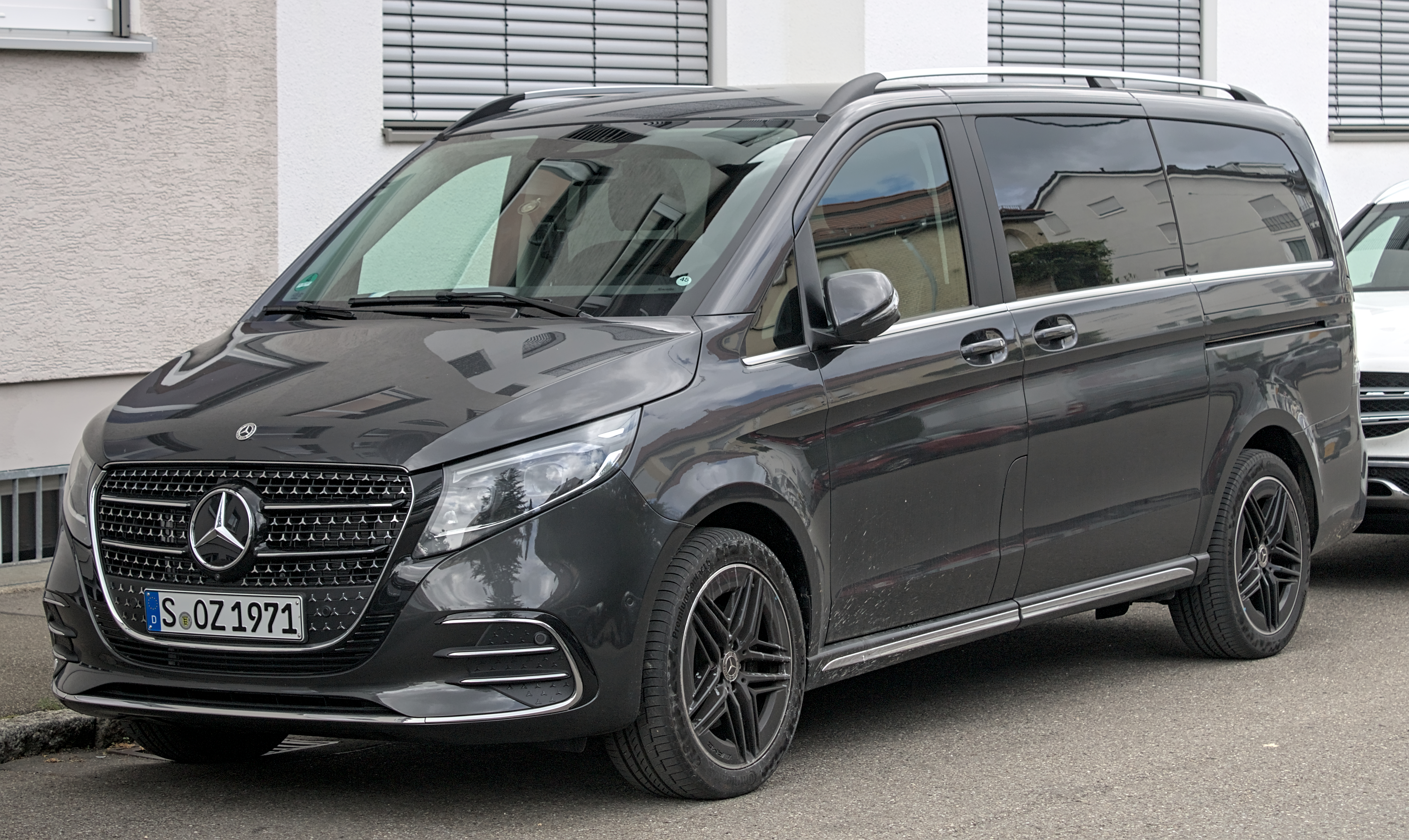
2024 Mercedes-Benz V-Class (facelift)

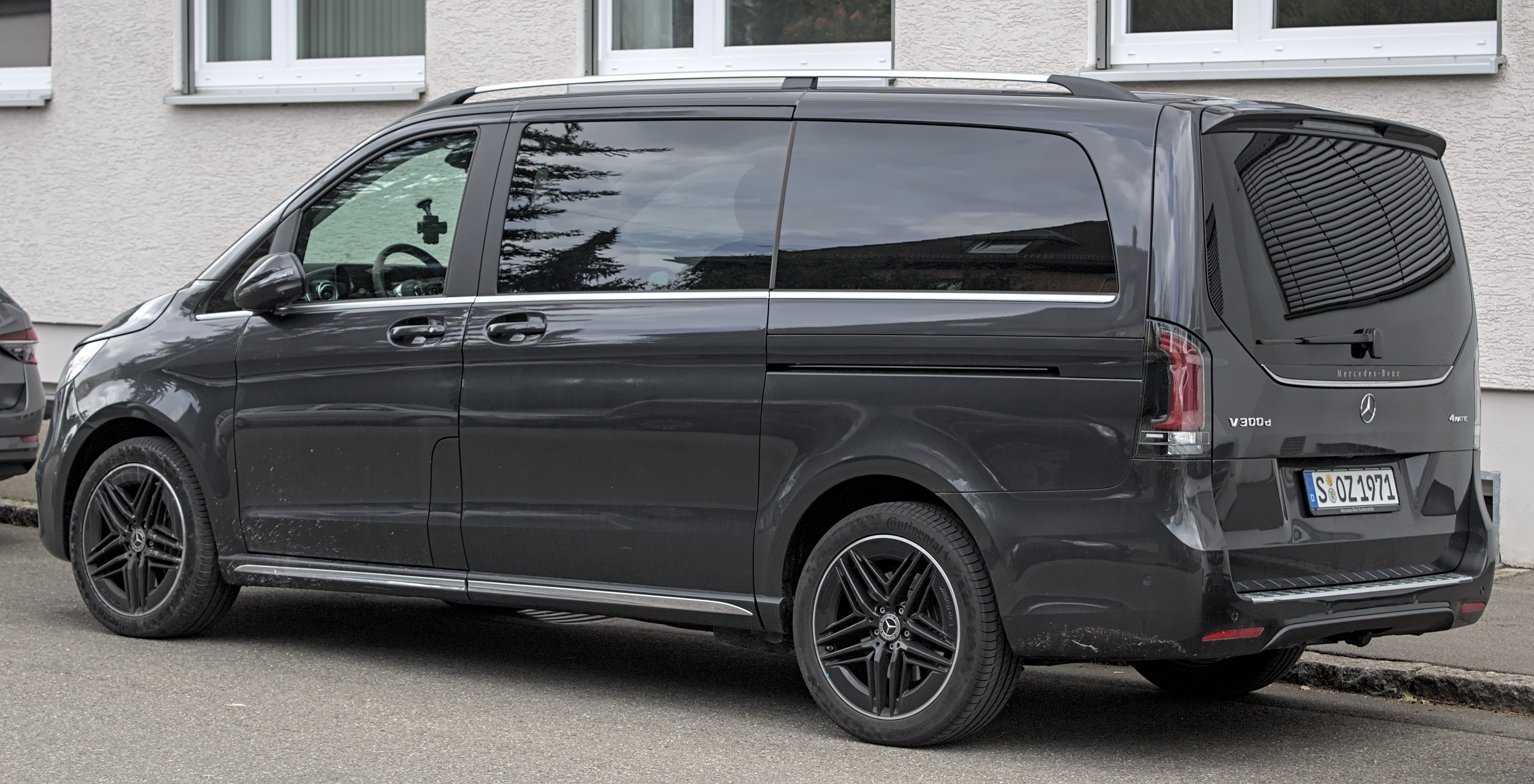
2024 Mercedes-Benz V-Class (facelift)

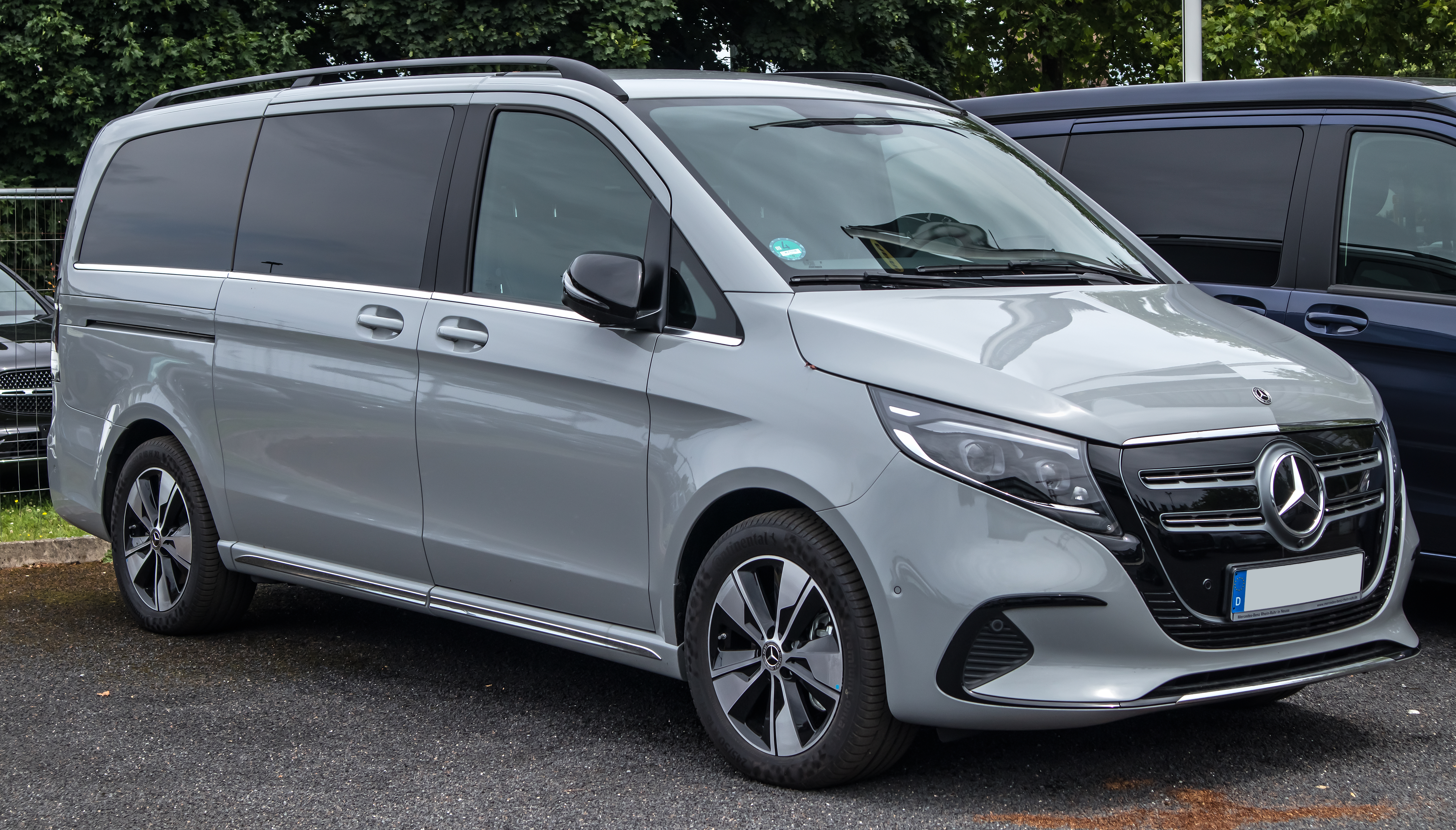
2024 Mercedes-Benz EQV (facelift)

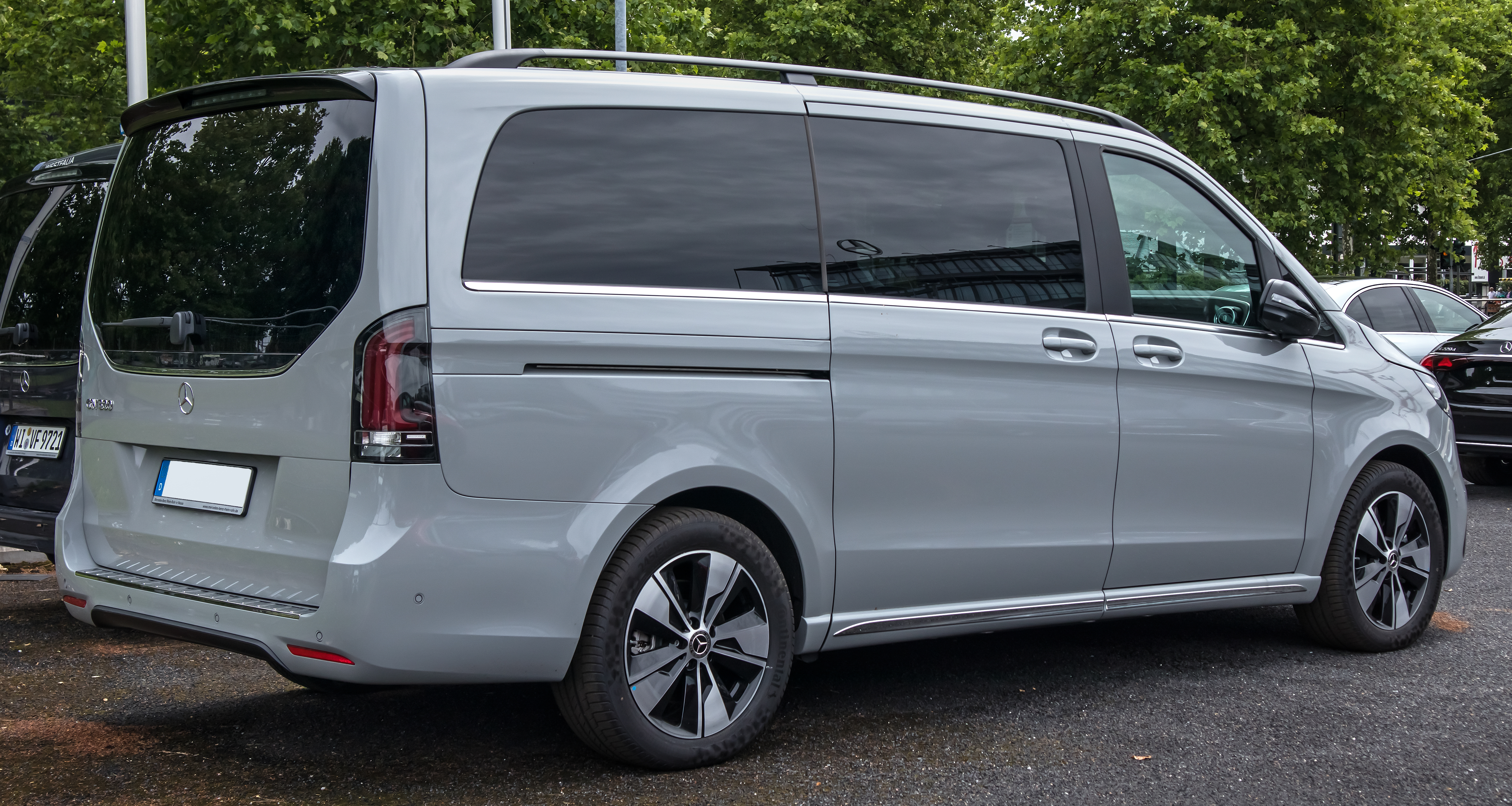
2024 Mercedes-Benz EQV (facelift)

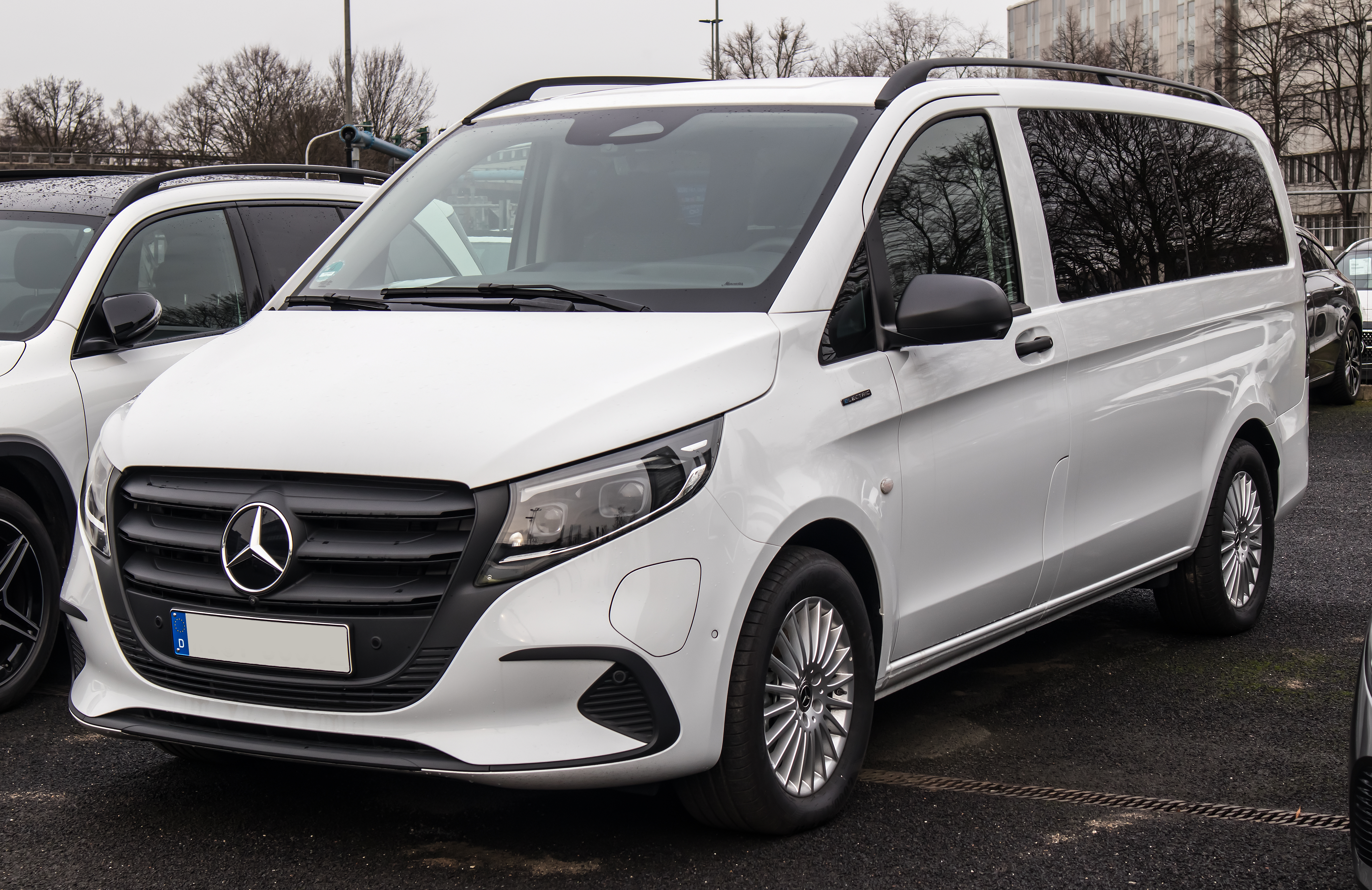
2024 Mercedes-Benz eVito (facelift)

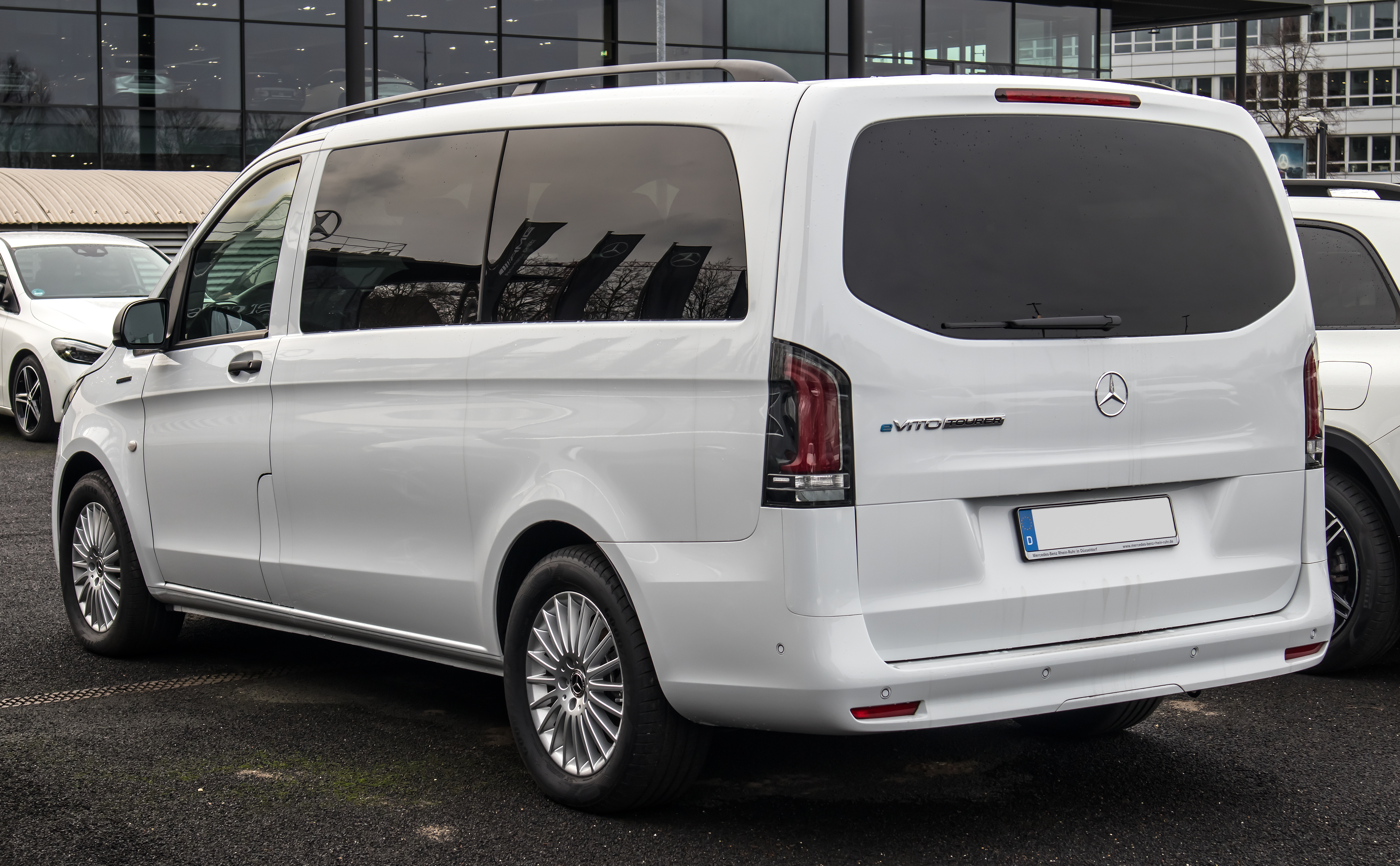
2024 Mercedes-Benz eVito (facelift)

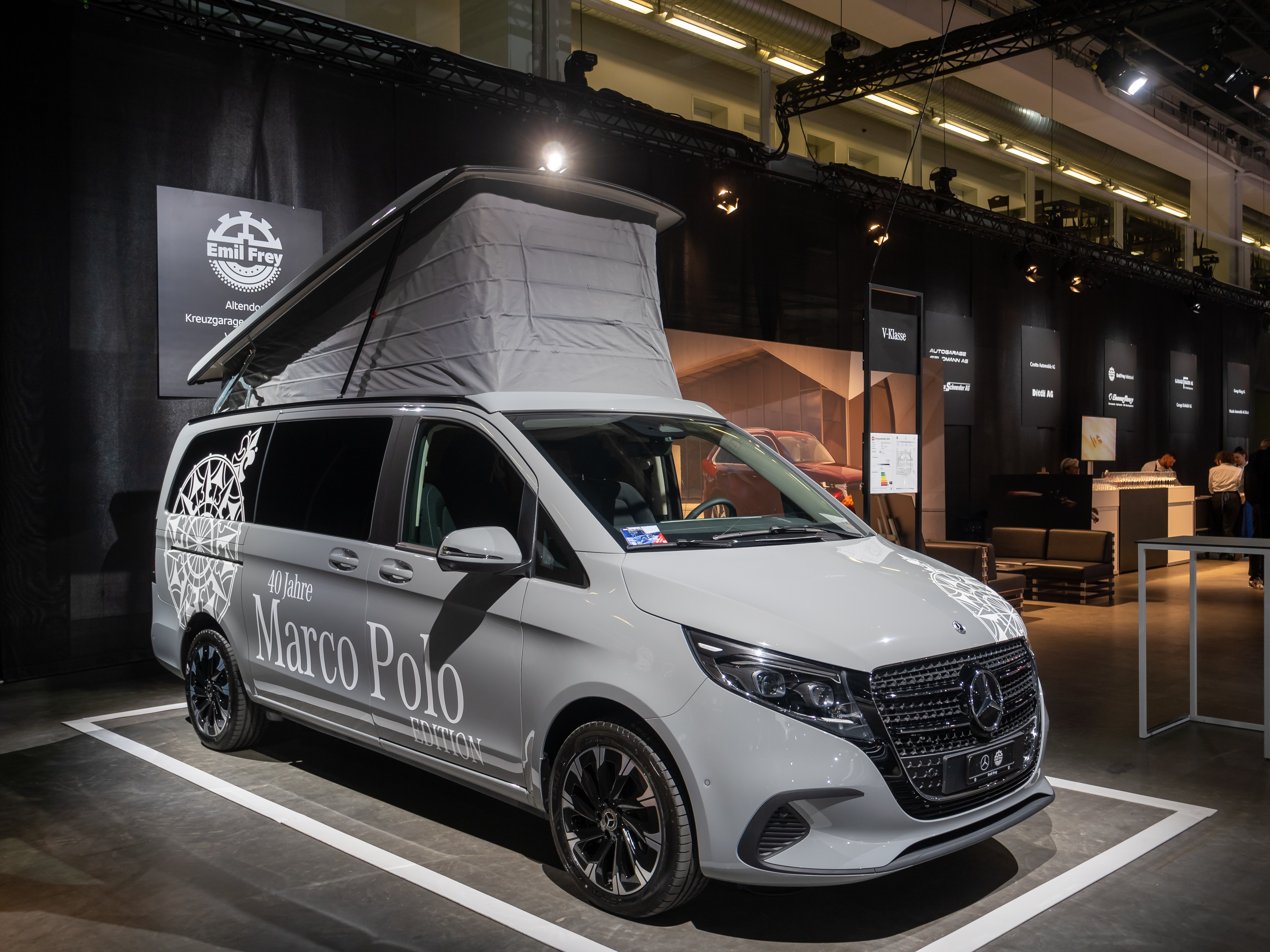
2024 Mercedes-Benz Marco Polo (facelift)

=== Engines ===
W447 engines
Model	Years	Type	Code	Output (@RPM)	
Model	Years	Type	Code	Power	Torque
Petrol engines
V 260, Metris	2015-2022	1,991 cc (121.5 cu in) I4 turbo	M274 DE20 LA	211 PS (155 kW; 208 hp) at 5500	350 N⋅m (258 lbf⋅ft) at 1200-4000
Diesel engines
V 200 d	2014-	2,143 cc (130.8 cu in) I4 twinscroll turbo	OM 651 DE 22 LA red.	136 PS (100 kW; 134 hp) at 3800	330 N⋅m (243 lbf⋅ft) at 1200-2400
V 220 d	2014-	2,143 cc (130.8 cu in) I4 twinscroll turbo	OM 651 DE 22 LA	163 PS (120 kW; 161 hp) at 3800	380 N⋅m (280 lbf⋅ft) at 1400-2400
V 250 d	2014-	2,143 cc (130.8 cu in) I4 twinscroll turbo	OM 651 DE 22 LA	190 PS (140 kW; 187 hp) at 3800	440 N⋅m (325 lbf⋅ft) at 1400-2400
V 250 d	2014-	2,143 cc (130.8 cu in) I4 twinscroll turbo	OM 651 DE 22 LA	204 PS (150 kW; 201 hp) at 3800 (overboost)	480 N⋅m (354 lbf⋅ft) at 1400-2400 (overboost)
V 300 d	2019-	1,950 cc (119 cu in) I4 twinscroll bi-turbo	OM 654 D20 SCR	237 PS (174 kW; 234 hp) at 3800	500 N⋅m (369 lbf⋅ft) at 1600-2400
V 300 d	2019-	1,950 cc (119 cu in) I4 twinscroll bi-turbo	OM 654 D20 SCR	237 PS (174 kW; 234 hp) at 3800 (overboost)	530 N⋅m (391 lbf⋅ft) at 1600-2400 (overboost)
Vito 109 CDI	2014-	1,598 cc (97.5 cu in) I4 turbo	OM 622 DE 16 LA	88 PS (65 kW; 87 hp) at 3800	230 N⋅m (170 lbf⋅ft) at 1500-2000
Vito 110 CDI (FWD)	2020-	1,698 cc (103.6 cu in) I4 turbo	OM 622 DE 17 LA	114 PS (84 kW; 112 hp) at 3800	270 N⋅m (199 lbf⋅ft) at 1500-2000
Vito 111 CDI	2014-	1,598 cc (97.5 cu in) I4 turbo	OM 622 DE 16 LA	114 PS (84 kW; 112 hp) at 3800	270 N⋅m (199 lbf⋅ft) at 1500-2500
Vito 114 CDI	2014-2020	2,143 cc (130.8 cu in) I4 twinscroll turbo	OM 651 DE 22 LA red.	136 PS (100 kW; 134 hp) at 3800	330 N⋅m (243 lbf⋅ft) at 1200-2400
Vito 114 CDI (FWD, RWD, 4WD)	2020-	1,698 cc (103.6 cu in) I4 turbo	OM 622 DE 17 LA	136 PS (100 kW; 134 hp) at 3800	330 N⋅m (243 lbf⋅ft) at 1200-2400
Vito 116 CDI	2014-2020	2,143 cc (130.8 cu in) I4 twinscroll turbo	OM 651 DE 22 LA	163 PS (120 kW; 161 hp) at 3800	360 N⋅m (266 lbf⋅ft) at 1600-2400
Vito 116 CDI (RWD, 4WD)	2020-	1,950 cc (119 cu in) I4 twinscroll turbo	OM 654 DE 20	160 PS (118 kW; 158 hp) at 3800	380 N⋅m (280 lbf⋅ft) at 1400-2400
Vito 119 BlueTEC	2014-	2,143 cc (130.8 cu in) I4 twinscroll turbo	OM 651 DE 22 LA	190 PS (140 kW; 187 hp) at 3800	440 N⋅m (325 lbf⋅ft) at 1400-2400
Vito 119 CDI BlueTEC (RWD, 4WD)	2020-	1,950 cc (119 cu in) I4 twinscroll turbo	OM 651 DE 22 LA	190 PS (140 kW; 187 hp) at 3800	440 N⋅m (325 lbf⋅ft) at 1400-2400
Vito 124 CDI (RWD, 4WD)	2020-	1,950 cc (119 cu in) I4 twinscroll bi-turbo	OM 654 D20	239 PS (176 kW; 236 hp) at 3800	500 N⋅m (369 lbf⋅ft) at 1600-2400
Electric motors
EQV 300	2020-	Permanent synchronous magnet electric motor		204 PS (150 kW; 201 hp)	362 N⋅m (267 lbf⋅ft)
eVito	2018-2020	Permanent synchronous magnet electric motor		116 PS (85 kW; 114 hp)	295 N⋅m (218 lbf⋅ft)
eVito Tourer	2020-	Permanent synchronous magnet electric motor		204 PS (150 kW; 201 hp)	362 N⋅m (267 lbf⋅ft)

BlueEFFICIENCY package is standard on all versions of V-Class featuring the 7G-TRONIC PLUS automatic transmission and is optionally available for all variants with 6-speed manual transmission.

Blue Efficiency package is available for Vito with OM 651 engine and rear-wheel drive, and standard for all Vito models with automatic transmission and a car registration.

Overboost is available for vehicles with 7G-TRONIC PLUS transmission and AGILITY SELECT, with transmission mode set to "Comfort" (C), "Sport" (S), or "Manual" (M).

=== Transmissions ===
Diesel engines
Model	Years	Types
V 220 d	2014-	ECO Gear 6-speed manual, 7-speed automatic (7G-TRONIC PLUS with DIRECT SELECT lever and DIRECT SELECT shift paddles)
V 250 BlueTEC	2014-	7-speed automatic (7G-TRONIC PLUS with DIRECT SELECT lever and DIRECT SELECT shift paddles)
Vito 109 CDI	2014-	ECO Gear 6-speed manual
Vito 110 CDI	2020-	ECO Gear 6-speed manual
Vito 111 CDI	2014-	ECO Gear 6-speed manual
Vito 114 CDI	2014-2020	ECO Gear 6-speed manual, 7-speed automatic (7G-TRONIC PLUS)
Vito 114 CDI	2020-	ECO Gear 6-speed manual, 9-speed 9G-Tronic automatic
Vito 116 CDI	2014-2020	ECO Gear 6-speed manual, 7-speed automatic (7G-TRONIC PLUS)
Vito 116 CDI	2020-	ECO Gear 6-speed manual, 9-speed automatic (9G-Tronic)
Vito 119 BlueTEC	2014-	7-speed automatic (7G-TRONIC PLUS)
Vito 119 CDI	2020-	9-speed automatic (9G-Tronic)
Vito 124 CDI	2020-	9-speed automatic (9G-Tronic)

Electric engines
Model	Years	Types
EQV 300	2020-	Single speed with fixed ratio
eVito Tourer	2020-	Single speed with fixed ratio

V-Class with 7G-TRONIC PLUS transmission includes optional AGILITY SELECT system with 4 transmission modes ("ECO" (E), "Comfort" (C), "Sport" (S) and "Manual" (M)).

=== Dimensions ===
Key W447 dimensions
Length Height				L1		L2	L3
Length Height				Exterior	4,895 mm (192.7 in)	5,140 mm (202.4 in)	5,370 mm (211.4 in)
Length Height				WB	3,200 mm (126.0 in)		3,430 mm (135.0 in)
Length Height				Interior	2,568 mm (101.1 in)	2,831 mm (111.5 in)	3,061 mm (120.5 in)
H1	Exterior	Interior	Volume	5.5 m^{3} (190 ft^{3})		6.0 m^{3} (210 ft^{3})	6.6 m^{3} (230 ft^{3})
H1	1,910 mm (75.2 in)	1,391 mm (54.8 in)	Volume	5.5 m^{3} (190 ft^{3})		6.0 m^{3} (210 ft^{3})	6.6 m^{3} (230 ft^{3})

Notes

- Interior width is 1,685 mm (66.3 in) for all versions, 1,270 mm (50.0 in) between the internal wheel arches.

=== Safety ===
==== ANCAP ====
ANCAP test results* Mercedes-Benz Valente all variants, excluding eVito Tourer (2014, aligned with Euro NCAP)
Test	Points	%
Overall:	5 /5 stars	
Adult occupant:	33.8	93%
Child occupant:	43	87%
Pedestrian:	20.1	67%
Safety assist:	6	85%

ANCAP test results* Mercedes-Benz Vito all van & crewcab variants WITHOUT side head-protecting airbags (curtains) (2014, aligned with Euro NCAP)
Test	Points	%
Overall:	4 /5 stars	
Adult occupant:	27.4	76%
Child occupant:	43	87%
Pedestrian:	20.1	67%
Safety assist:	6	85%

ANCAP test results* Mercedes-Benz Vito all van & crewcab variants with side head-protecting airbags (curtains), excluding eVito (2014, aligned with Euro NCAP)
Test	Points	%
Overall:	5 /5 stars	
Adult occupant:	33.8	93%
Child occupant:	43	87%
Pedestrian:	20.1	67%
Safety assist:	6	85%

ANCAP test results* Mercedes-Benz V-Class all variants, excluding eVito Tourer (2014, aligned with Euro NCAP)
Test	Points	%
Overall:	5 /5 stars	
Adult occupant:	33.8	93%
Child occupant:	43	87%
Pedestrian:	20.1	67%
Safety assist:	6	85%

ANCAP test results* Mercedes-Benz Marco Polo Activity (2014, aligned with Euro NCAP)
Test	Points	%
Overall:	5 /5 stars	
Adult occupant:	33.8	93%
Child occupant:	43	87%
Pedestrian:	20.1	67%
Safety assist:	6	85%

ANCAP test results Mercedes-Benz Vito MY24 variants (2024)
Overall
Grading:	90% (Platinum)

ANCAP test results Mercedes-Benz Vito MY24 variants (2024)
Overall
Grading:	90% (Platinum)

=== Euro NCAP ===
Euro NCAP test results Mercedes-Benz Vito (2025)
Test	Score
Overall:	5 /5 stars
Safe driving	75%
Crash avoidance	89%
Post crash	80%
