= Lucky Star (advertisement) =

Mercedes Benz advertisement

Lucky Star is an advertisement commissioned by Mercedes-Benz in 2002 to promote their SL500 automobile. Created by advertising agency Campbell Doyle Dye, it impersonated the form of a trailer for a purported thriller feature film titled Lucky Star. Actors Benicio del Toro and Ana Cristina starred in the piece, which was directed by Michael Mann.

== Content ==
The 2½-minute presentation centres on Mr. H (del Toro), whose success in gambling and on stock market trading attracts the attention of United States intelligence agencies, who are suspicious as to how he can be so consistently lucky. They cannot find any evidence of illegal behaviour but nonetheless continue to hound their suspect, eventually forcing him to flee. Pursued by the authorities, including a helicopter, through downtown Los Angeles, he makes a surprise getaway in his car with his female companion Evilina (Cristina).

== Concept ==
The piece aired in cinemas and on television in the United Kingdom market, starting in July 2002. Participating cinemas aired it as part of the forthcoming-presentations block, after other advertisements, to further promote the illusion of a feature film; advertising rules only require clear transmission of an advertisement's nature in printed media. A companion "official film" website was also commissioned. The production cost for the entire campaign was estimated at GBP 5 million (then US$7.9 million).

Director Michael Mann imagined the piece as if it were a complete motion picture, hiring a number of the production staff he worked with on previous films Heat and The Insider, likening the finished product to the classic 1955 film noir Kiss Me Deadly. Although he was uncredited for his work (the billing credited "Mercedes Films"), he received an undisclosed fee for his involvement and retained the rights to make a real Lucky Star movie in the future. The "lucky star" (German: Dreifach stern) is the name of the three-pointed star that makes up the Mercedes Benz logo.

== Reaction ==
Media reaction to the premise of Lucky Star commented on its style of product placement as novel and subtle, drawing comparison with an earlier advertising campaign by BMW, but also criticised Mann and Mercedes for utilising moviegoers' suspension of disbelief to promote their product.
