= Mercedes-Benz SL-Class (R129) =

Roadster produced by Mercedes-Benz (1989–2001)

Mercedes-Benz SL (R129)
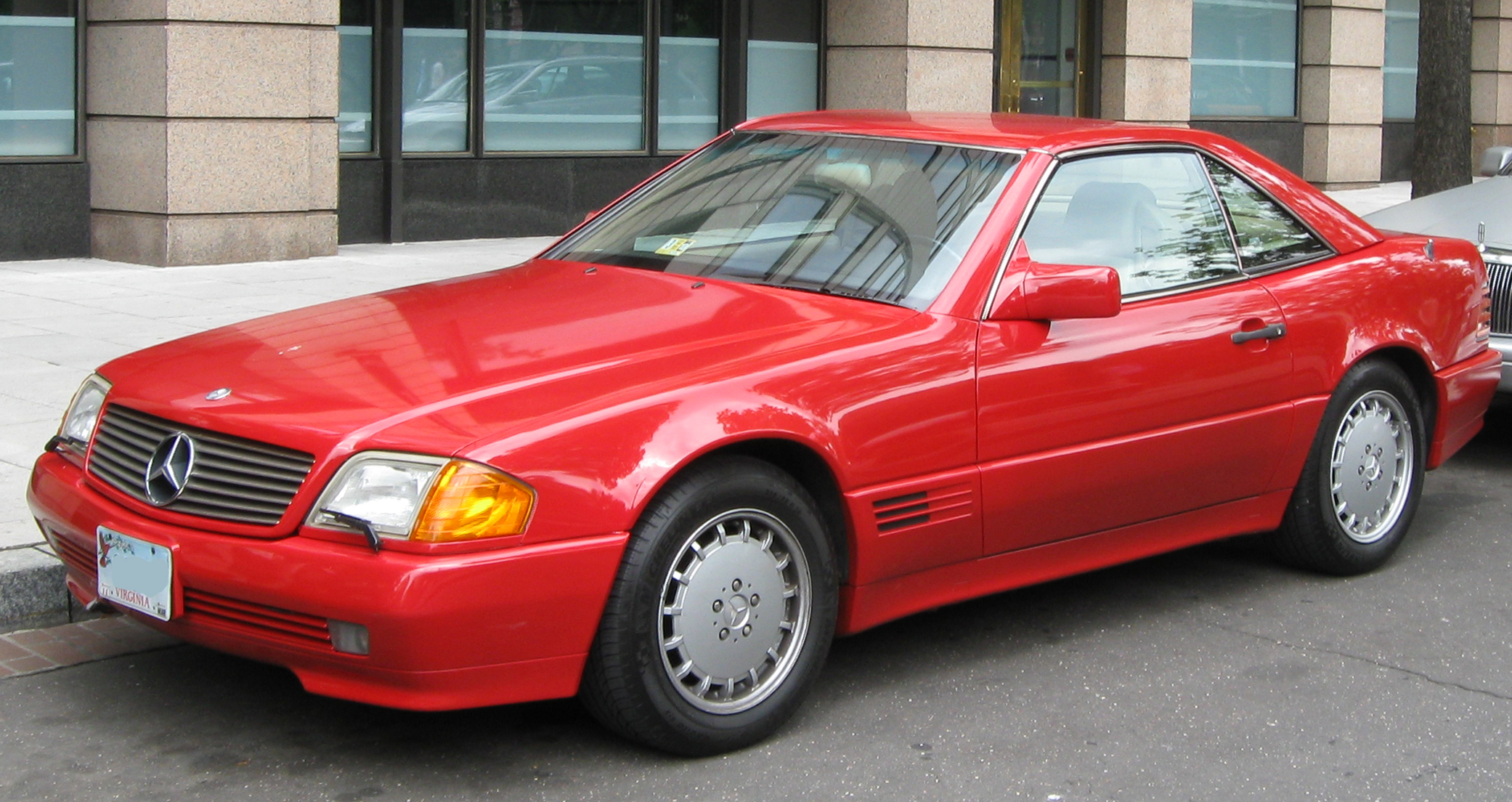

Overview
- Manufacturer: Daimler-Benz (1988–1998); DaimlerChrysler (1998–2001)
- Production: May 1988–2001; 213,089 built
- Assembly: Germany: Bremen; South Africa: East London (Mercedes-Benz South Africa)
- Designer: Bruno Sacco (1985, 1986); Johann Tomforde (1984)

Body and chassis
- Class: Sports car / Grand tourer
- Body style: 2-seater convertible
- Layout: Front-engine, rear-wheel-drive

Powertrain
- Engine: 2.8 L M104 I6; 2.8 L M112 V6; 3.0 L M103 I6; 3.0-3.2 L M104 I6; 3.2 L M112 V6; 5.0 L M119 V8; 5.0 L M113 V8; 5.4 L M113 AMG V8; 6.0 L M119 AMG V8; 6.0 L M120 V12; 7.1-7.3 L M120 AMG V12
- Transmission: 5-speed manual; 4-speed 4G-Tronic automatic; 5-speed 4G-Tronic 722.5 automatic; 5-speed 5G-Tronic automatic

Dimensions
- Wheelbase: 99.0 in (2,515 mm)
- Length: 1997–2001: 177.1 in (4,498 mm); 1989–1996: 176.0 in (4,470 mm); 1992–96 V12: 178.0 in (4,521 mm)
- Width: 71.3 in (1,811 mm)
- Height: 1992–2001: 51.3 in (1,303 mm); 1989–1991: 50.7 in (1,288 mm)

Chronology
- Predecessor: Mercedes-Benz R107
- Successor: Mercedes-Benz R230

The Mercedes-Benz R129 SL is a roadster which was produced by Mercedes-Benz from 1988 until 2001. The R129 replaced the R107 in 1989 and was in its turn replaced by the R230 SL-Class in 2002 for the 2003 model year.

The R129 was offered as a two-door roadster with an automated (electro-hydraulic), fabric convertible roof; colour-matched, automated tonneau cover; and a manually detachable hardtop that could be fitted over the stored fabric convertible roof and tonneau. It was available with a variety of powertrains across its twelve-year production, including a V12 option used in the SL600.

== Development and launch ==
Designed in 1984, the R129 was based on the shortened floorpan of the Mercedes-Benz W124. The new SL-class was presented at the Geneva Motor Show in March 1989, with left-hand drive sales beginning that summer and right-hand drive sales in the autumn. It came runner-up behind the Citroen XM for the European Car of the Year accolade.

== Models ==
Model	Chassis	Engine	From Year	To Year
SL 280	129.058	104.943	1993	1998
SL 280	129.059	112.923	1998	2001
300 SL	129.060	103.984	1988	1993
300 SL-24	129.061	104.981	1988	1993
SL 320	129.063	104.991	1993	1998
SL 320	129.064	112.943	1998	2001
500 SL	129.066	119.960	1988	1993
500 SL	129.067	119.972	1993	1995
SL 500	129.067	119.972	1995	1998
SL 500	129.068	113.961	1998	2001
600 SL	129.076	120.981	1991	1993
SL 600	129.076	120.981	1993	2001

== Model history ==
Designed in 1984, the fourth-generation SL (commonly referred to as R129, the car's internal designation) was based on the shortened floorpan of the Mercedes-Benz W124 and featured many innovative details for the time, such as electronically controlled damping (Adaptive Damping System ADS, optional) and a hidden, automatically extending roll-over bar. Its predecessor's somewhat dated rear suspension with semi-trailing arms gave way to a modern multi-link axle. The number of standard features was high, with power windows, mirrors, seats, and hydraulic convertible top among the car's many amenities.

This car has a distinction of being the first passenger vehicle to have seat belts integrated into the seats as opposed to anchoring to the floor, B-pillar, and transmission tunnel.

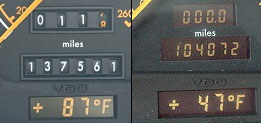
Odometer switched from mechanical to electronic between the 1994 and 1995 models.

Note the slots behind the wheel are different

Note the tail lights are different

For the 1994 model year, R129 SLs received new nomenclature, with the alphanumeric naming convention reversed so that the class designation now came before the numeral; this was the first major change to the Mercedes-Benz model naming convention in decades. Under the new format, the 500 SL became SL 500 and the 300 SL became either the SL 280 or SL 320 depending on which engine was equipped.

1995 models featured the following updates:

- Odometer switched from mechanical to electronic.
- A portable cell phone with voice activated dialing became an option.
- Clear front turn signal indicators were added for U.S. models.
- A Bose stereo with rear speakers and subwoofer was made standard.

A minor facelift for the 1996 model year brought further updates, including several small exterior changes that helped differentiate them from the earlier cars. Changes included:

- Front wing vents were updated, with the new design featuring 2 rounded slots rather than 3 squared slots.
- Bumpers were now body color.
- V8 and V12 models retired their hydraulic 4-speed transmission for a 5-speed electronic transmission.
- Xenon HID headlamps became standard on SL 600, optional on SL 500.
- Side airbags were added.

Despite the refresh in 1996, further changes were made in 1997. Most notable was a new panoramic roof, but the following features and packages also became newly standard or available:

- A new front-seat occupant-detection sensor could deactivate the right-side airbag when it determined that the passenger seat held less than 26 pounds
- A new "Sport" package became an option
- Automatic rain-sensing windshield wipers were made standard
- A three-way programmable garage door opener "HomeLink" transmitters was now built into the rear-view mirror
- The climate control panel was upgraded with a larger LCD readout

1999 SLs were significantly refreshed; these models featured some of the most notable changes since the car debuted, such as:

- For SL 500 models, the M119 V8 was replaced by the M113 V8.
- Nappa leather replaced the perforated leather seats found in older models.
- A new steering wheel design was introduced.
- Body-color door handles became standard.
- Taillights with curved faces replaced the classic square ribbed lights.
- 17-inch wheels were made standard: Wheels are now 8.25 x 17" with 245/45ZR17 tires. Models equipped with the Sport package are equipped a staggered-wheel designed featuring 245/40/R18 and 275/35/R18 tires front and rear, respectively.
- Fiber-optic digital audio replaces analog copper connections for the CD player.
- One-touch starting is introduced, called "Tip-start" by Mercedes-Benz. Once the key is turned, the engine cranks on its own until it catches and starts.
- Instrument cluster is updated to feature silver rings around each gauge.
- Oil pressure gauge is replaced by oil temperature gauge.
- Different engine vanity cover is introduced.
- Passenger side storage net is added on transmission tunnel.

== Engine history ==
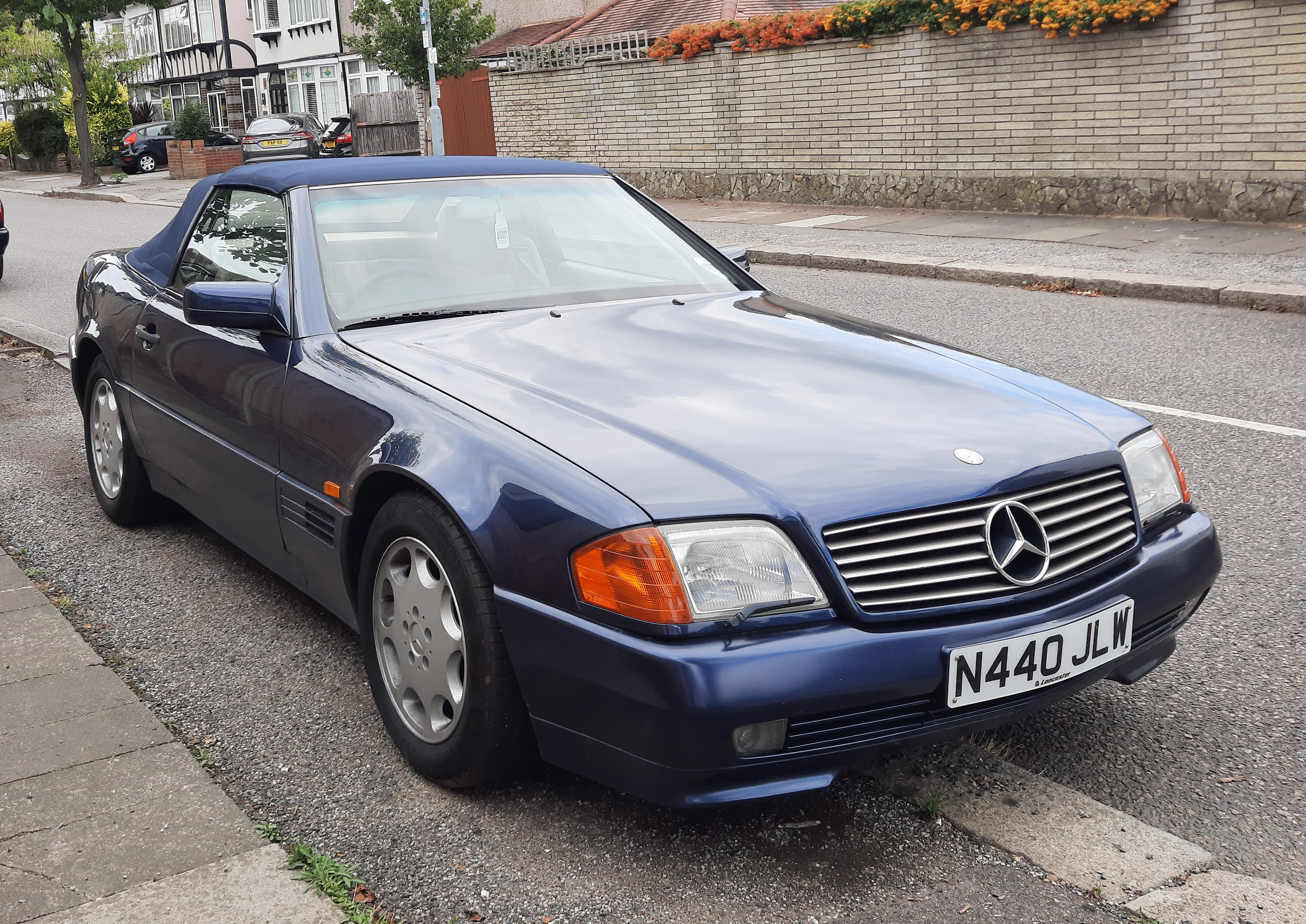
1989–1995 Mercedes-Benz SL 320

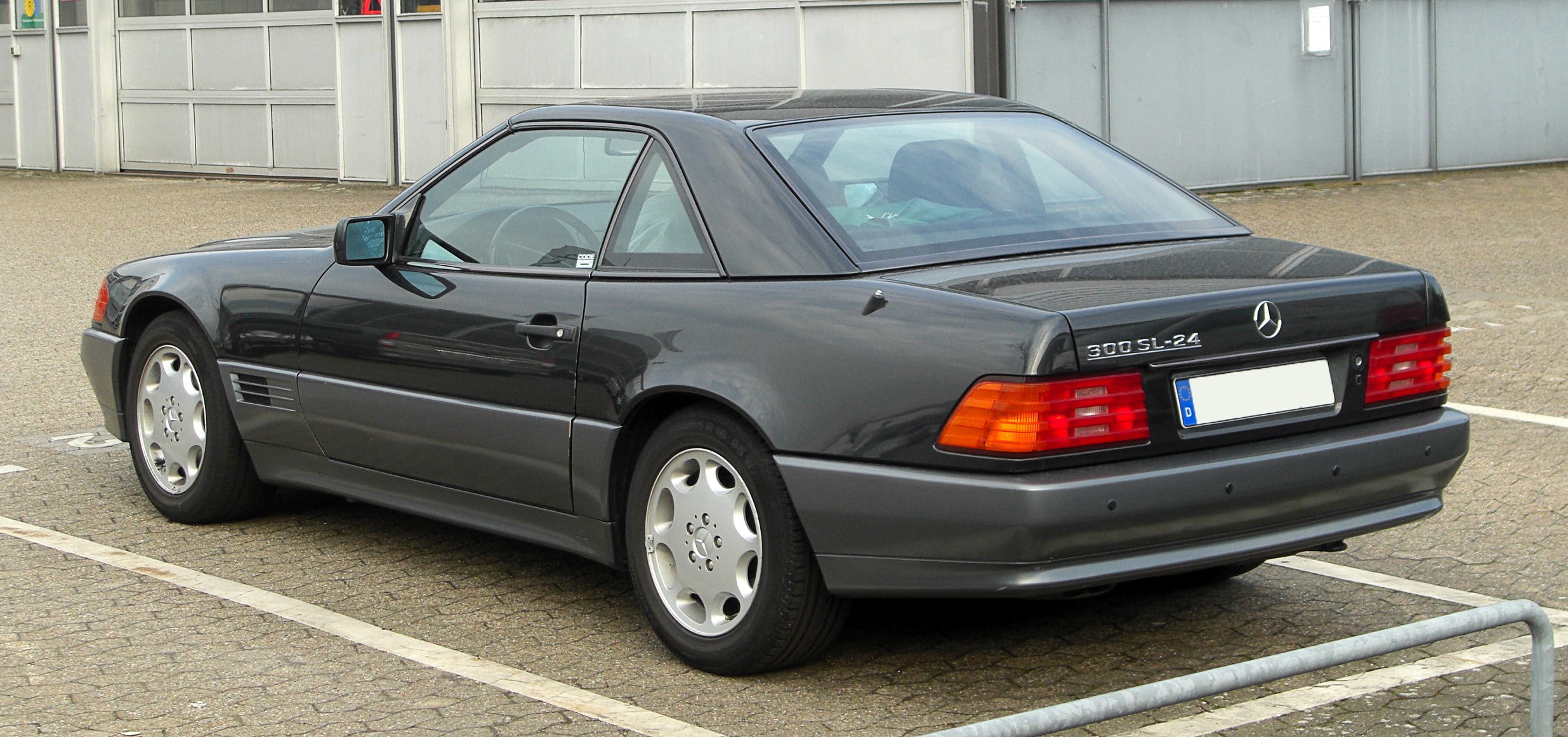
1989–1995 Mercedes-Benz 300 SL-24

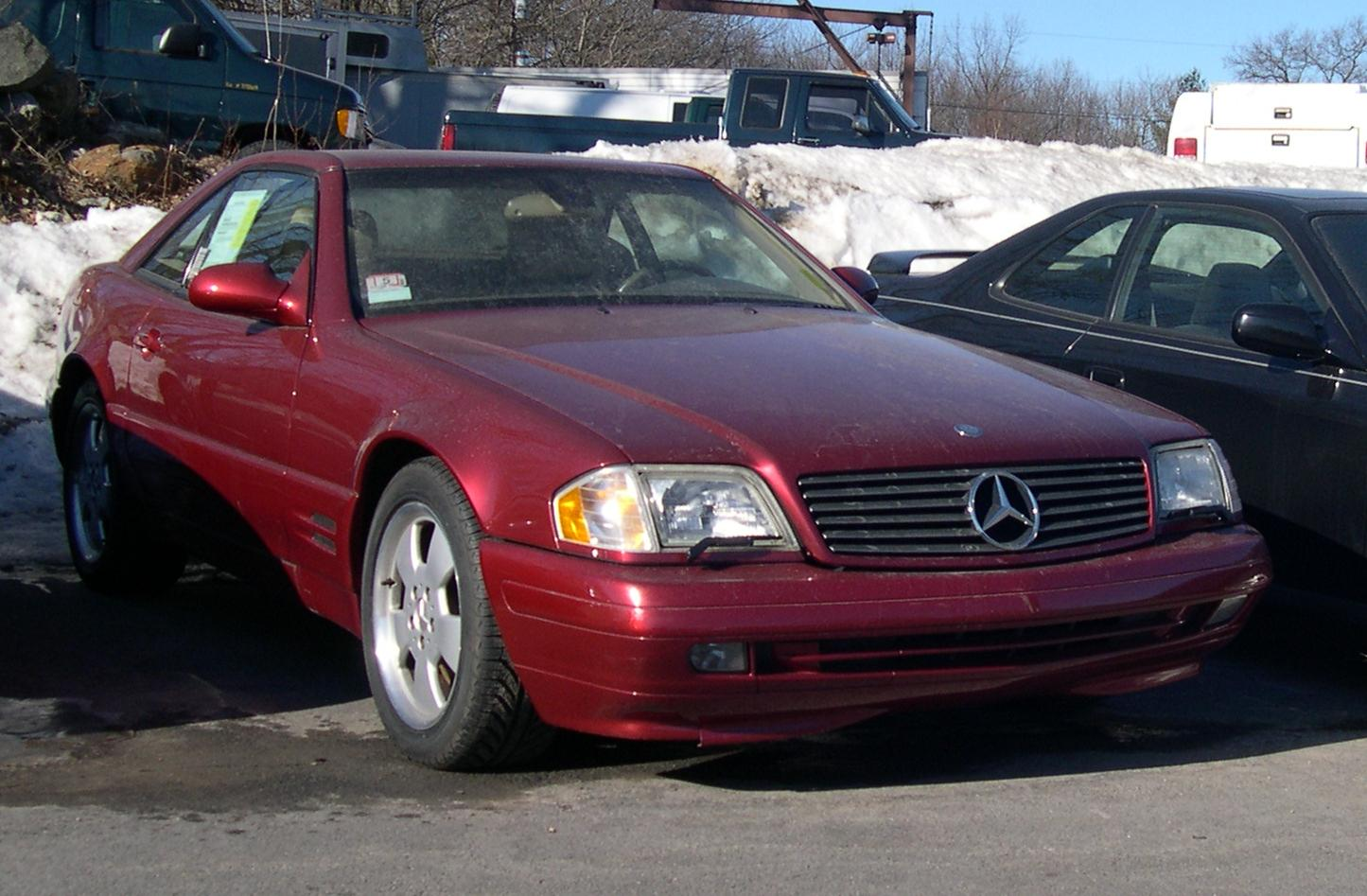
1998–2001 Mercedes-Benz SL 500

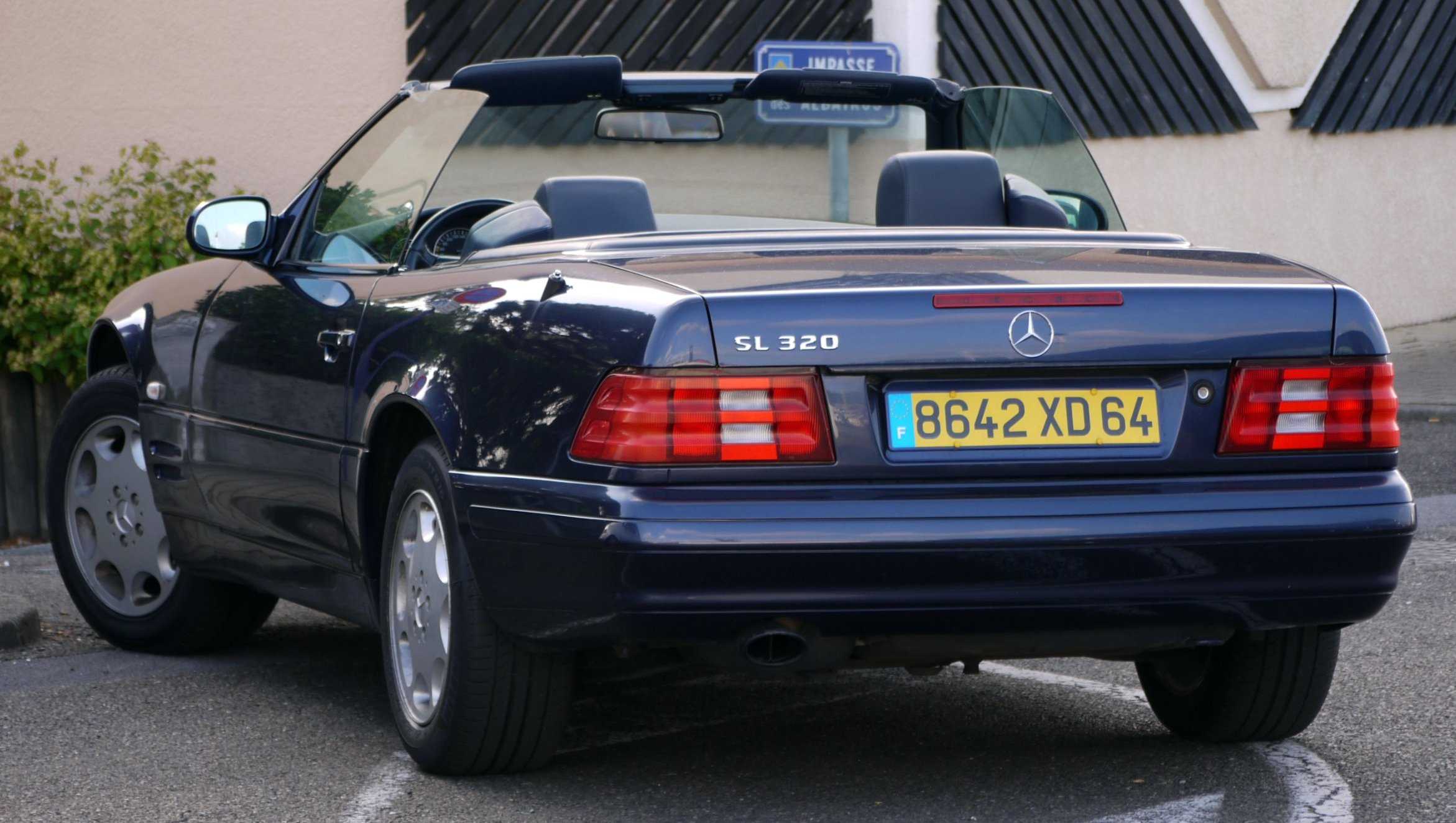
1998–2001 Mercedes-Benz SL 320

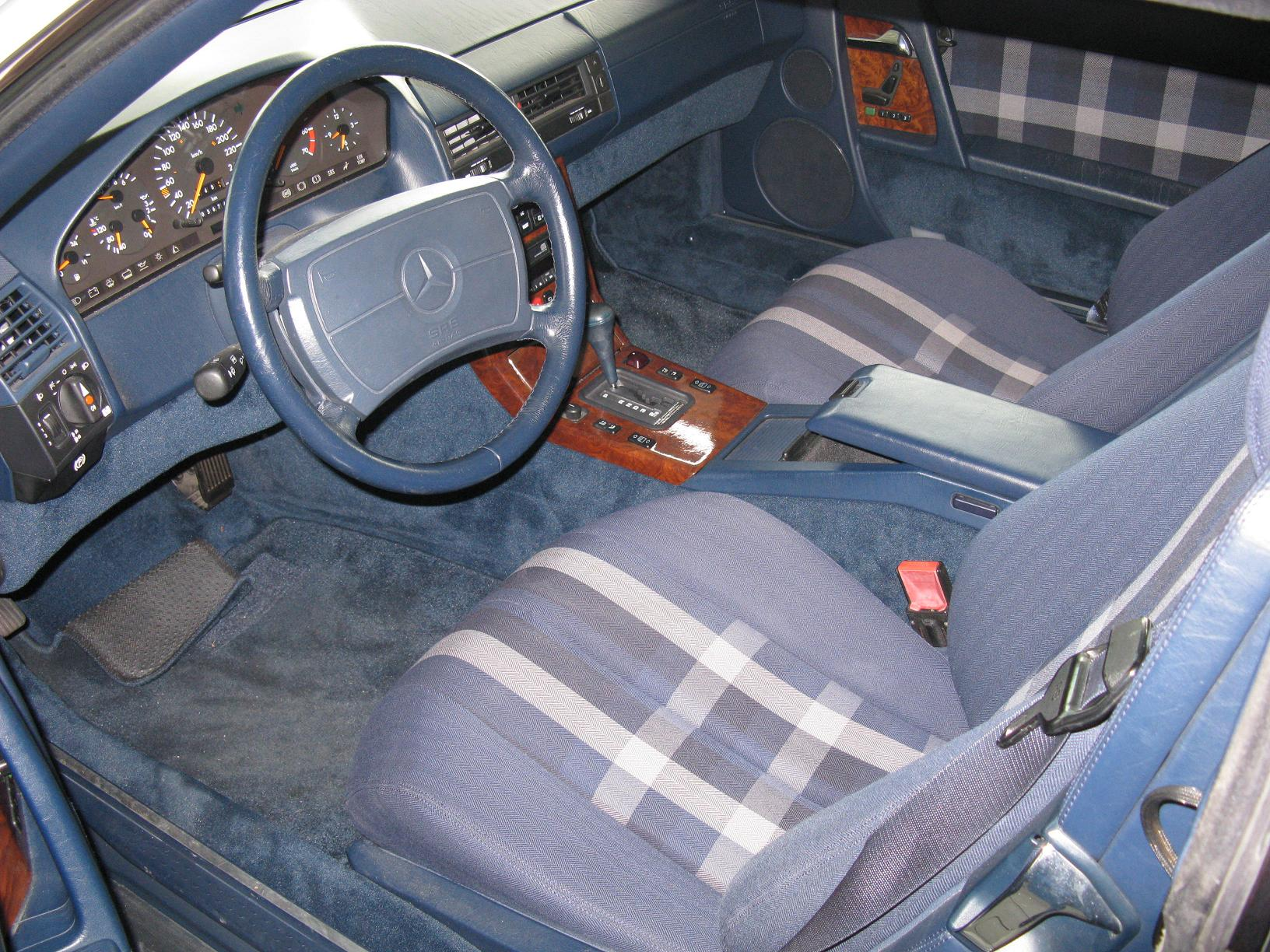
Mercedes-Benz 500 SL blue cloth interior

Initially, there were three different engines available,

- 300 SL with a M103 3.0 L 12-valve SOHC I6 (188 hp (191 PS; 140 kW) at 5,700 rpm),
- 300 SL-24 with a M104 3.0 L 24-valve DOHC I6 (228 hp (231 PS; 170 kW) at 6,300 rpm),
- 500 SL with a M119 5.0 L 32-valve DOHC V8 (322 hp (326 PS; 240 kW) at 5,500 rpm),

and joined in July 1992 by the

- 600 SL with a M120 6.0 L 48-valve DOHC V12 (389 hp (394 PS; 290 kW) at 5,200 rpm).

There was a choice of 5-speed manual or 4–5 speed automatic for the six-cylinder cars; the V8 and V12 could only be ordered with a 4-speed automatic gearbox.

In autumn 1993 Mercedes-Benz rearranged names and models. Also, the 300 SL and 300 SL-24 were respectively replaced by:

- SL 280 with a M104 2.8 L 24-valve DOHC I6 (190 hp (193 PS; 142 kW) at 5,500 rpm),
- SL 320 with a M104 3.2 L 24-valve DOHC I6 (228 hp (231 PS; 170 kW) at 5,500 rpm).

Only the 280 was available with a manual gearbox. SL 500 and 600 continued with their respective engines.

A second facelift, introduced in late 1998, comprised new external mirrors, 17" wheels and new bumpers. Also new were the engines,

- SL 280 with a M112 2.8 L 18-valve SOHC V6 (201 hp (204 PS; 150 kW) at 5700 rpm),
- SL 320 with a M112 3.2 L 18-valve SOHC V6 (221 hp (224 PS; 165 kW) at 5,600 rpm),
- SL 500 with a M113 5.0 L 24-valve SOHC V8 (302 hp (306 PS; 225 kW) at 5,600 rpm).

The V12 engine remained unchanged.

Powertrains
Model	Engine	Horsepower & Torque	Top Speed	0-100 km/h (0-62 mph)
1989–1993
300SL	3.0 L M103 I6	140 kW (191 PS; 188 hp) and 260 N·m (191 ft·lb) of torque	228 km/h (142 mph)	9.3 seconds
300SL-24	3.0 L M104 I6	170 kW (231 PS; 228 hp) and 271 N·m (200 ft·lb) of torque	240 km/h (149 mph)	8.4 seconds
500SL	5.0 L M119 V8	240 kW (326 PS; 322 hp); 450 N·m (331 ft·lb) of torque	250 km/h (155 mph)	6.2 seconds
600SL	6.0 L M120 V12	290 kW (389 hp; 394 PS) and 570 N·m (420 ft·lb) of torque	250 km/h (155 mph)	6.1 seconds
Late 1993–Late 1998
SL280	2.8 L M104 I6	142 kW (190 hp; 193 PS) and 270 N·m (199 ft·lb) of torque	225 km/h (140 mph)	9.3 seconds
SL320	3.2 L M104 I6	170 kW (228 hp; 231 PS) and 315 N·m (232 ft·lb) of torque	240 km/h (149 mph)	8.4 seconds
SL500	5.0 L M119 V8	235 kW (316 hp; 320 PS) and 470 N·m (346 ft·lb) of torque	250 km/h (155 mph)	6.5 seconds
SL600	6.0 L M120 V12	290 kW (389 hp; 394 PS) and 570 N·m (420 ft·lb) of torque	250 km/h (155 mph)	6.1 seconds
Late 1998–2001
SL280	2.8 L M112 V6	150 kW (201 hp; 204 PS) and 270 N·m (199 ft·lb) of torque	232 km/h (144 mph)	9.5 seconds
SL320	3.2 L M112 V6	165 kW (221 hp; 224 PS) and 315 N·m (232 ft·lb) of torque	238 km/h (148 mph)	8.4 seconds
SL500	5.0 L M113 V8	225 kW (302 hp; 306 PS) and 460 N·m (339 ft·lb) of torque	250 km/h (155 mph)	6.5 seconds
SL600	6.0 L M120 V12	290 kW (389 hp; 394 PS) and 570 N·m (420 ft·lb) of torque	250 km/h (155 mph)	6.1 seconds

Powertrains (AMG)
Model	Engine	Horsepower & Torque	Top Speed	0-100 km/h (0-62 mph)	Number Produced
SL 55	5.4 L M113 V8	260 kW (349 hp; 354 PS) and 530 N·m (391 ft·lb) of torque	270 km/h (168 mph)	5.8 seconds	65 units
SL 60	6.0 L M119 V8	280 kW (375 hp; 380 PS) and 580 N·m (428 ft·lb) of torque	250 km/h (155 mph)	5.8 seconds	633 units
SL 70	7.1 L M120 V12	365 kW (489 hp; 496 PS) and 720 N·m (531 ft·lb) of torque	250 km/h (155 mph)	5.0 seconds	150 units
SL 72	7.1 L M120 V12	375 kW (503 hp; 510 PS) and 750 N·m (553 ft·lb) of torque	298 km/h (185 mph)	4.8 seconds	35 units
SL 73	7.3 L M120 V12	386 kW (518 hp; 525 PS) and 750 N·m (553 ft·lb) of torque	320 km/h (199 mph)	4.5 seconds	50 units

== Australian market ==
The new Mercedes Benz R129 roadster was first introduced into the Australian market in May 1990 with the 500SL model. The 600SL followed in May 1993, while a 6 cylinder SL did not arrive until the SL280 in October 1995.

Only 38 cars of the 600SL/SL 600 were delivered to the Australian market.

== North American market ==
Not all engines were offered in North America. The 1990 Mercedes-Benz SL base model was the 228 hp 300 SL version (European 300 SL-24) equipped with a five-speed manual or five-speed automatic transmission, but it was the 322 hp 500 SL (with a 5.0-litre V8 engine) which made the most headlines. For model year 1993, the 600 SL was additionally introduced stateside.

The SL 320 replaced the 300 SL in the United States in 1994, but the SL 280 was not offered. The manual transmission option was also dropped at this time, after just 397 examples were imported over a four model year span. The 6-cylinder SLs were dropped altogether from the US lineup in 1998, leaving just the V8 and V12.

== Chassis ==
=== 1990–1995 ===
Front suspension Independent damper struts with separate coil springs and gas-pressurised shock absorbers, triangular lower control arms with anti-dive geometry and stabiliser bar.

Rear suspension Independent 5-arm multilink with separate single-tube gas-pressurised shock absorbers and coil springs, geometry for anti-lift, anti-squat and alignment control, stabiliser bar.

Wheels 8.0Jx16H2 aluminium alloy and regular.

Tyres 225/55 ZR 16 steel-belted radial.

Brakes 2-circuit hydraulic power-assisted 4-wheel discs. Antilock Braking System (ABS).

=== 1996–1997 ===
Body construction Monocoque with front and rear crumple zones and removable hardtop.

Front suspension Independent damper strut with anti-dive geometry and stabiliser bar. Separate shock absorbers and coil springs. Negative-offset steering.

Rear suspension Independent 5-arm multilink with geometry for anti-lift, anti-squat and alignment control and stabiliser bar. Separate shock absorbers and coil springs.

Steering Recirculating ball with speed-sensitive power assist and hydraulic damper. Steering wheel turns (lock-to-lock) 3.0.

Tyres Steel-belted radials. Performance 225/55ZR16.

Wheels aluminium alloy 8.0Jx16 H2.

Brakes 2-circuit hydraulic power-assisted 4-wheel disc. Ventilated front, solid rear brake discs.

Antilock Braking System (ABS) ABS senses impending wheel lock-up under heavy braking and pumps the front brakes individually or the rear brakes together (to help maintain stability), as needed, up to 30 times per second to prevent lock-up and maintain steering ability.

== Dimensions ==
=== 1990–1995 ===
==== 300 SL ====
Wheelbase 99.0 in

Curb weight
1989	1,800 kg (3,970 lb)
1991	1,819 kg (4,010 lb)
1993	1,830 kg (4,035 lb)
1994	1,855 kg (4,090 lb)

Boot capacity 7.9 cu ft

Fuel capacity 79.9 L – 21.1 gal (US) 17.5 gal (Imp)

==== 500 SL ====
Wheelbase 99.0 in

Curb weight
1989	1,880 kg (4,145 lb)
1993	1,889 kg (4,165 lb)
1994	1,890 kg (4,167 lb)

Boot capacity 7.9 cu ft

Fuel capacity 79.8 L – 21.1 gal

==== 600 SL ====
Wheelbase 99.0 in

Curb weight 2020 kg – 4,455 lb

Boot capacity 7.9 cu ft

Fuel capacity 79.8l 21.1 gal

== Special editions ==
=== AMG offerings ===
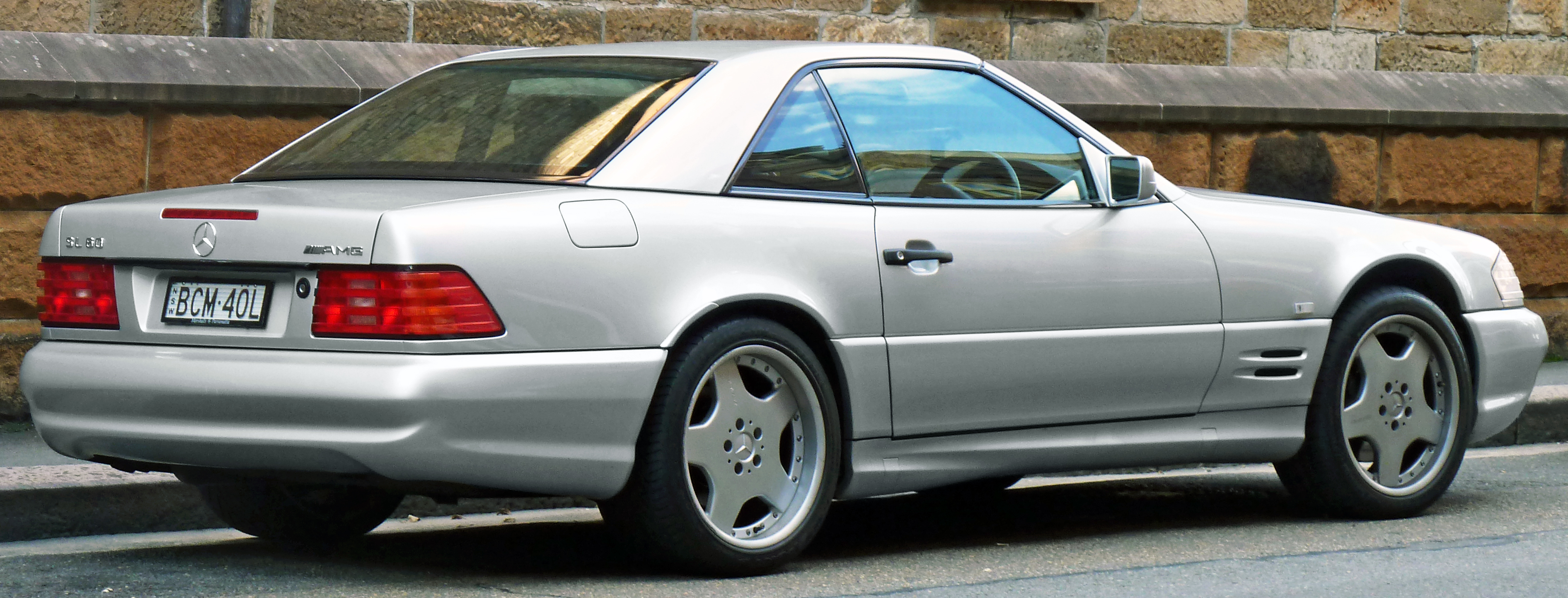
1995–1998 Mercedes-Benz SL 60 AMG

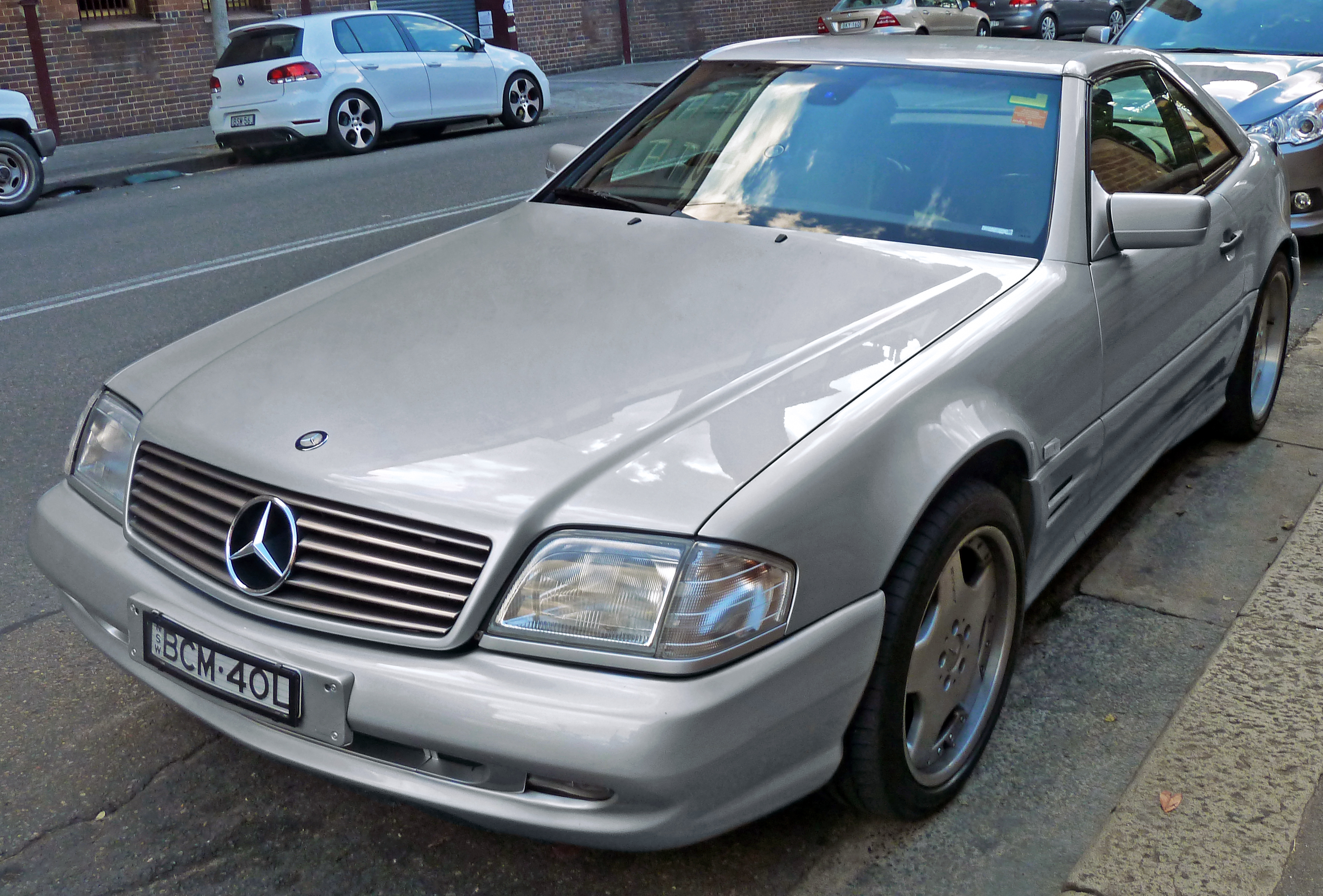
1995–1998 Mercedes-Benz SL 60 AMG

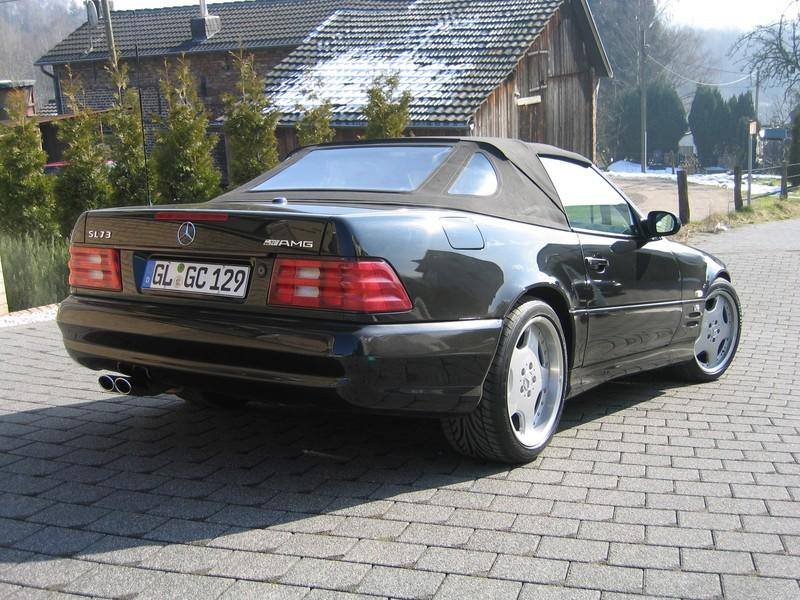
1999 Mercedes-Benz SL 73 AMG

AMG had already offered an SL version while still independent, the AMG 500 SL 6.0 of 1991. After being taken over by Daimler-Benz, there were several AMG SL-models available through D-B dealers.

The SL 60 AMG was the most numerous of these rare cars. Sold from 1993 to 1998, it used a 6.0 litres (5,956 cc) V8 engine producing 375 hp (380 PS; 280 kW) at 5,500 rpm. AMG claimed a 0–100 km/h (62 mph) speed of 5.4 seconds. Its top speed was limited to 250 km/h (155 mph).

Extremely rare was the SL 72 AMG, with a 7.1 litres (7,055 cc) engine, sold through Mercedes-AMG in 1995, and offering the most powerful V12 engine ever put into an SL up to that time with 510 PS (375 kW; 503 hp). Only 35 cars were made.

After a brief hiatus, the SL 73 AMG was offered with the new M120 engine 7.3 litres (7,291 cc) from 1997 to 2001, with a bore x stroke of 91.5 mm × 92.4 mm (3.60 in × 3.64 in) DOHC 4 valves per cylinder, fuel fed by naturally aspirated Bosch HFM fuel injection and a compression ratio of 10.5:1, producing 518 hp (525 PS; 386 kW) at 5,500 rpm and 750 N⋅m (553 lbf⋅ft) at 4,000 rpm of torque, which was later used also by Pagani in the Zonda, enabling the SL 73 to set off from 0 to 100 km/h (62 mph) in no longer than 4.5 seconds, while achieving a top speed of above-320 km/h (199 mph). Only 50 cars were made.

Also very rare is the SL 70 AMG which was powered by a 7.1 litres (7,055 cc) V12 engine developing 496 PS (365 kW; 489 bhp) at 5,500 rpm and a maximum torque of 720 N⋅m (531 lbf⋅ft) at 3,900 rpm. It was a bored out version of M120 6.0 V12 and with a longer stroke. Produced between 1996 and 1997 in 150 units.

The SL 55 AMG was sold in the R129 body style from 1998 to 2001 in limited numbers (5.4L V8, 349 hp (354 PS; 260 kW) at 5,500 rpm). It was the predecessor of the production R230 SL 55 AMG sold later, albeit was normally aspirated in the R129 and not supercharged as in its R230 successor. 65 cars were made.

Only about 300 (without the SL 60) cars in the SL-class were customised by AMG prior to the 2003 model year.

=== Mille Miglia Edition ===
In 1995 Mercedes released the Mille Miglia edition, to commemorate the 40th anniversary of Stirling Moss's win of the 1955 Mille Miglia road race. The limited edition was available in either SL 280, SL 320, or SL 500 guise; came in Brilliant Silver metallic; and had Evo II six-spoke polished alloys, red and black leather interior, carbon-fibre trim and extra equipment. Stirling Moss was given the first SL 500 built. According to the brochure of this special edition, only 600 pieces were to be built, however only 40 were built.

=== Silver Arrow Edition ===
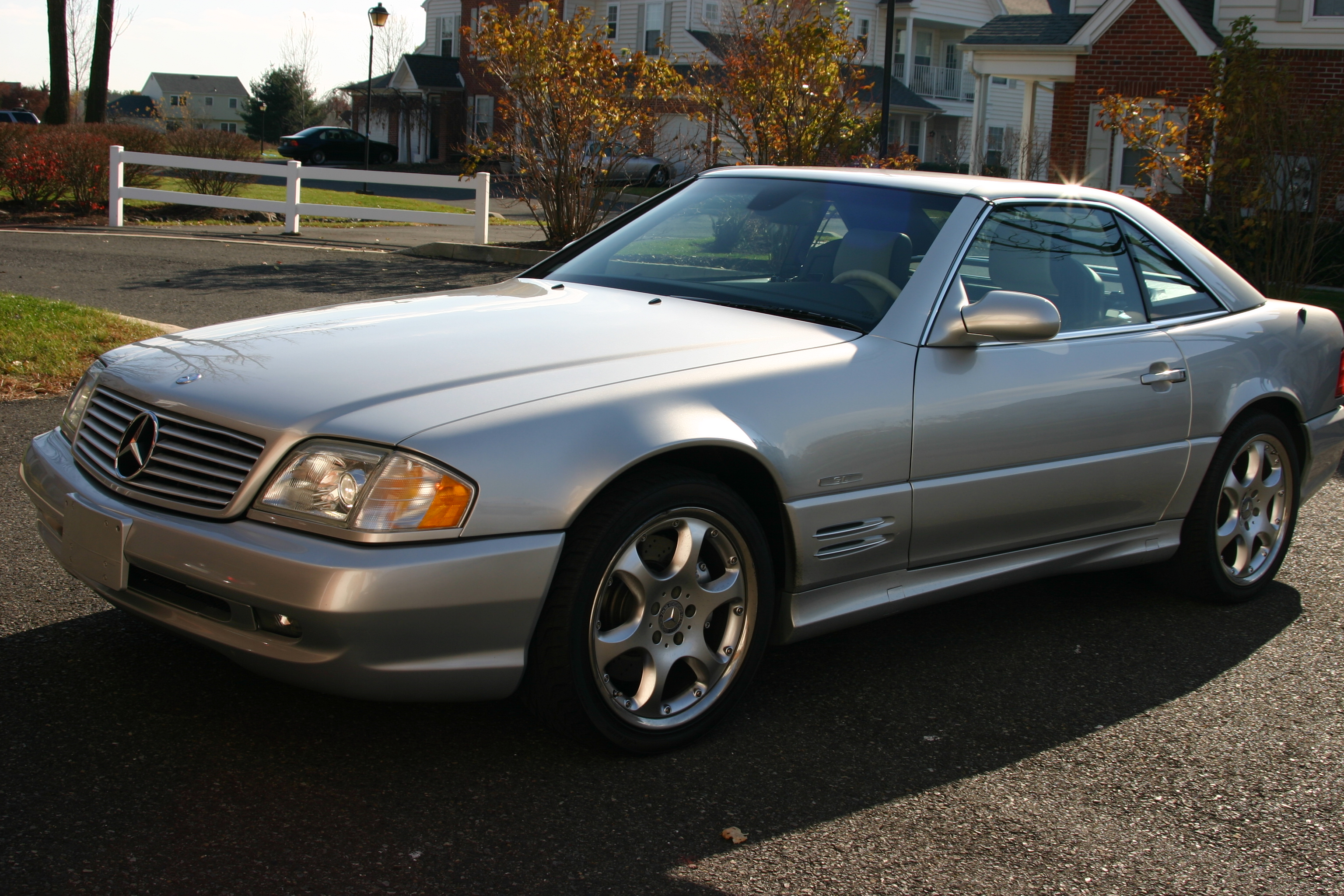
Silver Arrow Edition

A special edition of 2002 SL 500/SL 600 was made to celebrate the 1930s Silver Arrow race car. It had full AMG body package, painted in Silver Arrow only special 777 metallic paint, special Silver Arrow designation on interior and exterior badging, two-tone silver and black interior, leather on steering wheel and seats, Silver Arrow illuminated sill plates, Silver Arrow leather bordered floor mats, special dark wood, and special BBS 2 piece wheels with polished stainless steel beauty rings. For the US market, only 1550 Silver Arrow units were produced; 100 units of the SL 600 and 1450 units of the SL 500. For the UK market, just 100 Silver Arrows were made, all of which were SL 500 models.

=== Other editions ===
Several other editions were released of the 129 body SL. These include:

- 40th Anniversary Roadster Edition (1997)
- La Costa Edition (1997)
- Sport model SL 320 included AMG staggered tire setup (1997)
- Special Edition (1998)
- Final Edition (2000)
- SL Edition (2000)
- Designo Slate Blue Edition (North America, 2000-01)
- Designo Black Diamond Edition (North America, 2000-01)
- F1 Edition (2001)

== Media attention ==
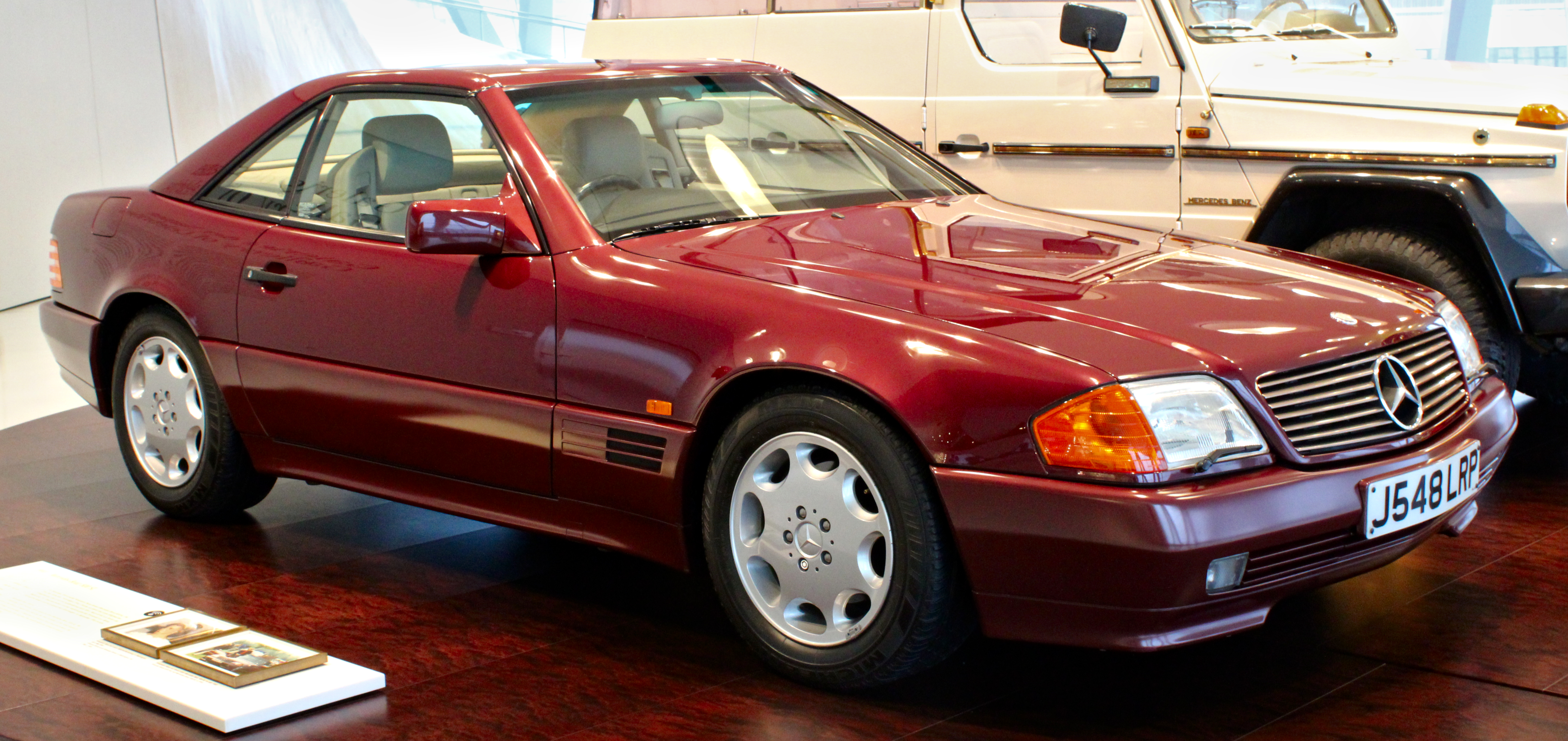
Princess Diana's Mercedes 500 SL

The R129 received heightened media attention in 1991 for two reasons.

Diana, Princess of Wales sold her Jaguar XJS to lease a metallic-red 500 SL, becoming the first member of the royal family to use a foreign car. This was not without controversy, as it sparked a media storm that questioned whether a member of the British royal family should drive a foreign car. Media pressure eventually forced her to return the car to Mercedes-Benz in 1992. It now resides in the Mercedes-Benz Museum.

Victor Chang, a pioneer of modern heart transplantation, as well as Companion of the Order of Australia and Australian of the Century (People's Choice Awards), was fatally shot while driving his 500 SL in Sydney.
