= Mercedes-Benz SL-Class (R230) =

Mercedes-Benz SL (R230)
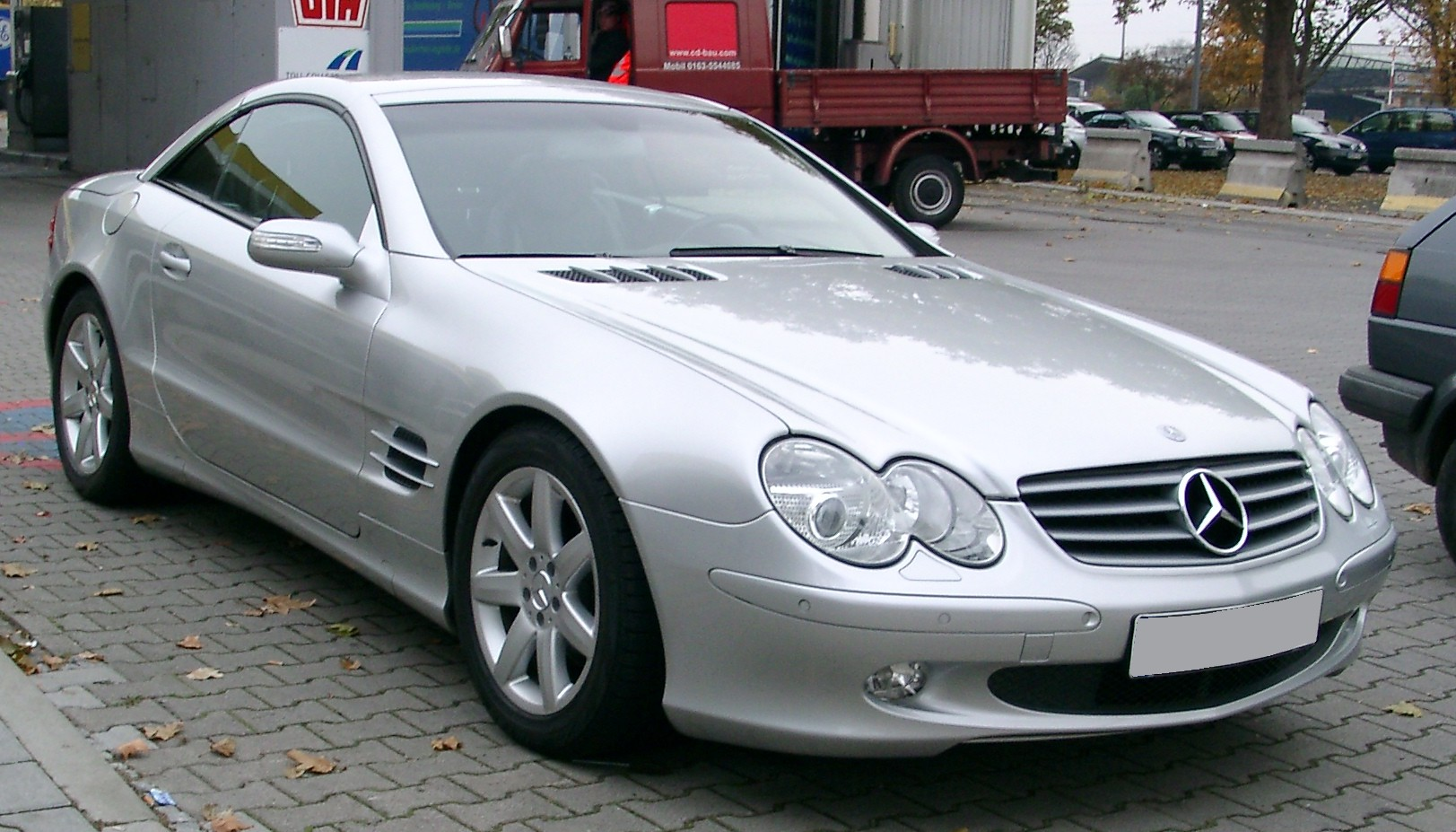

Overview
- Manufacturer: DaimlerChrysler (2001–2007); Daimler AG (2007–2011)
- Production: July 2001 – 6 December 2011
- Model years: 2002–2011
- Assembly: Germany: Bremen
- Designer: Steve Mattin; Bruno Sacco (1997)

Body and chassis
- Class: Grand tourer (S)
- Body style: 2-door retractable hardtop; 2-door coupé (SL65 AMG Black Series)
- Layout: Front-engine, rear-wheel-drive
- Related: Fisker Tramonto

Powertrain
- Engine: 3.0 L M272 V6; 3.5 L M272 V6; 3.7 L M112 V6; 5.0 L M113 V8; 5.4 L M113 supercharged V8; 5.5 L M273 V8; 5.5 L M275 twin-turbo V12; 6.0 L M275 twin-turbo V12; 6.2 L M156 V8
- Transmission: 6-speed Sequentronic automated manual; 5-speed 5G-Tronic automatic; 7-speed 7G-Tronic automatic

Dimensions
- Wheelbase: 100.8 in (2,560 mm)
- Length: 178.5 in (4,534 mm)
- Width: 2005–2011: 71.5 in (1,816 mm); 2002–2004: 72.0 in (1,829 mm)
- Height: 51.0 in (1,295 mm)

Chronology
- Predecessor: Mercedes-Benz R129
- Successor: Mercedes-Benz R231

The R230 generation of the Mercedes-Benz SL-Class was introduced at the 2001 Frankfurt Motor Show and 2001 Bologna Motor Show, replacing the R129. The R230 underwent revisions in 2006 and 2008, and was superseded by the new R231 SL-Class in 2011.

== Development ==
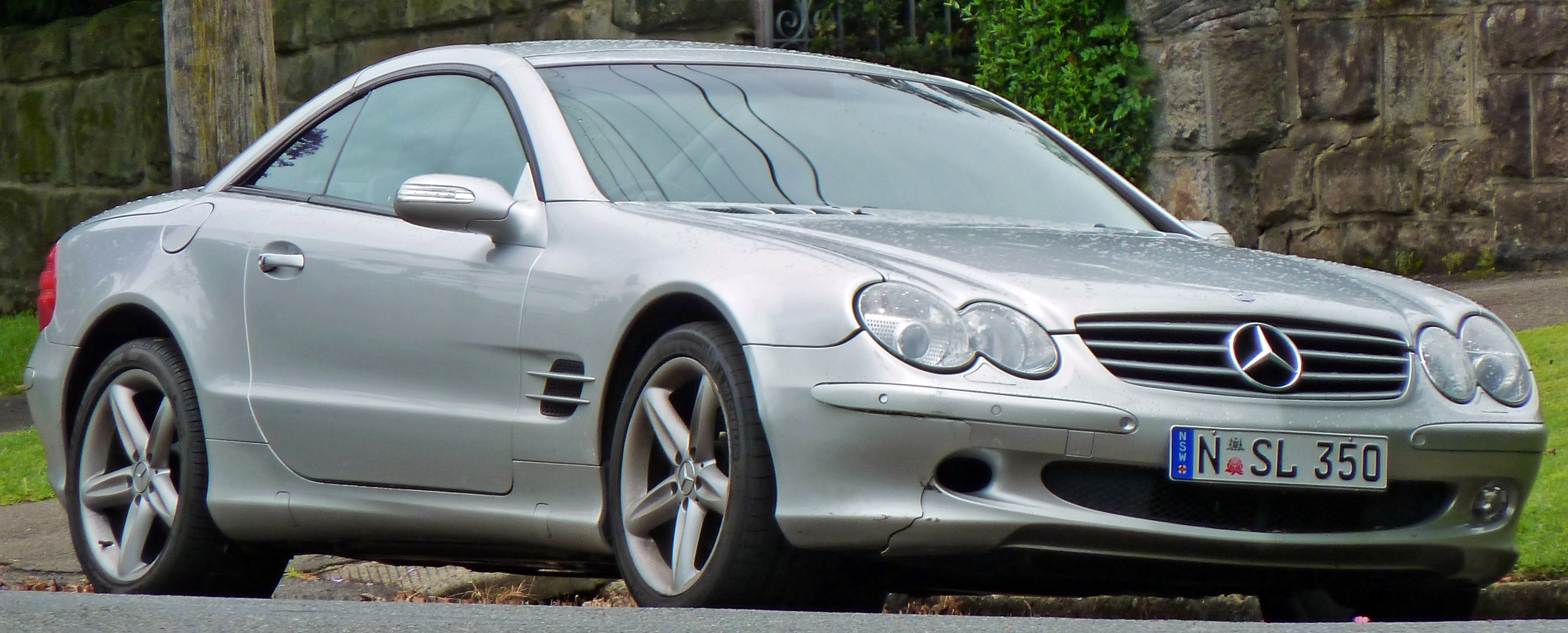
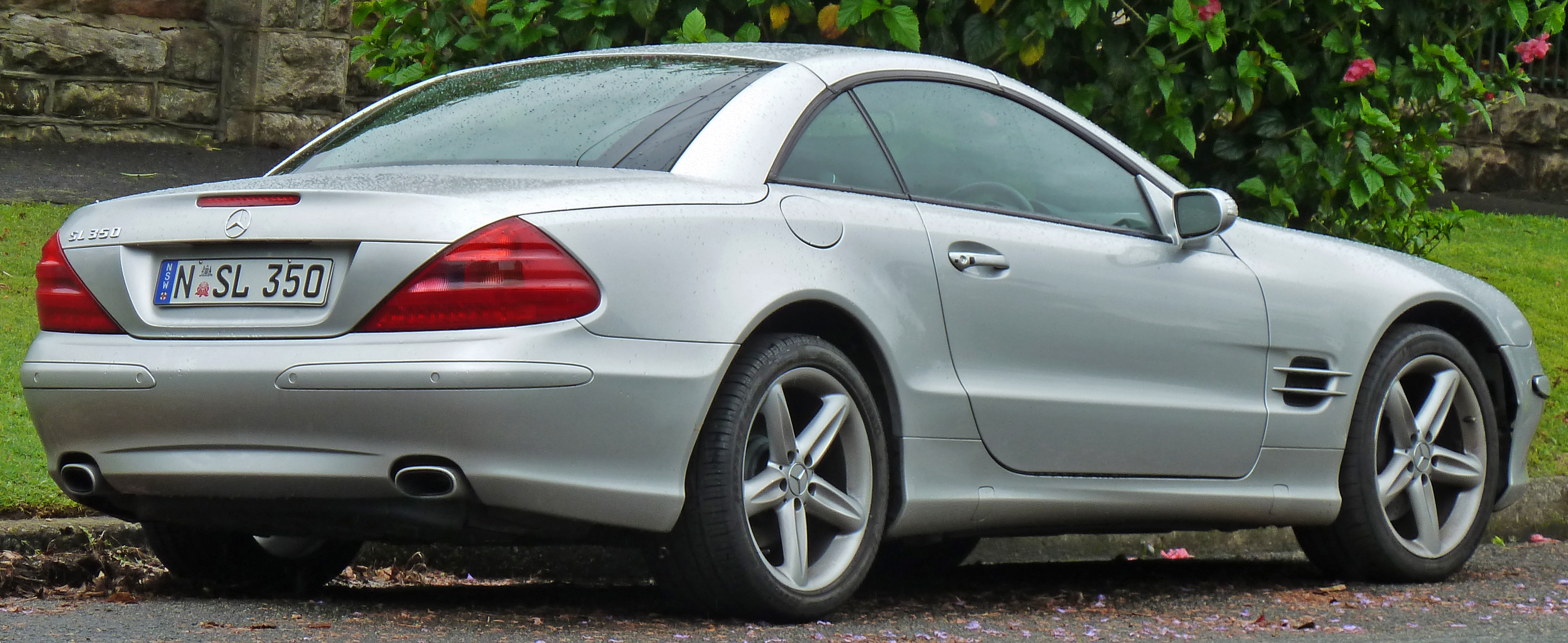
Pre–facelift Mercedes-Benz SL 350 (Australia)

In early 1996, over six years into the life of the R129, development work on a successor began. On 27 January 1996, design work commenced, and draft designs were submitted by ten designers in Germany, California, and Japan. Hundreds of sketches were submitted and would form the basis for twelve quarter-scale models digitized for computer manipulation. Design of the R230 would progress through two different formats. The real world process centered on the traditional 1:4 scale models, with most of them initially being done clay. Virtual world design development took place in a room packed with state-of-the-art computer processing technology referred to as the "CAVE" (Computer Aided Virtual Environment). This technology was also used earlier on to design the W203 in 1995.

The supercomputer in the "CAVE" was able to create full-size images of selected designs, using its five projectors and allowing designers to inspect every inch of every surface rendered. Parallel to the virtual process, the twelve scale models were scrutinized as well, with four standouts chosen to be created in full-size mockups. This evolution of the scale models occurred alongside the development of the interior design. On 16 June 1997, the final design for the R230 was approved by the board and refined into production specifications into 1998. The design patents for the R230 were later filed in Germany on 9 September 1999 and on 1 March 2000 in the United States.

In July 2001, after over five years of development, the new SL was unveiled and introduced at the 2001 Frankfurt Motor Show that September. Production began on 13 October 2001 at the Bremen plant and European sales commenced that November.

== First generation ==
This car first appeared as the Safety Car for Formula One at the 2001 German Grand Prix in Hockenheim. The street version was unveiled at the 2001 IAA. The range was launched with a film style advertisement called Lucky Star.

50th Anniversary Edition SL

With the 2004 model year there was a limited production model of 500 units introduced to celebrate the 50th Anniversary of the SL roadster model fitted with the 245 PS (180 kW) 3500cc V6 engine along with the five-speed automatic transmission or a 5-litre 306 PS (225 kW) V8 engine with 7G-TRONIC automatic transmission. This Anniversary Edition came only in iridium silver metallic exterior, black leather interior with black ash wood trim, exclusive twin-spoke rims, custom luggage bag for rear shelf, and many other standard options and features.

=== SL 600 ===
The SL 600 is the highest-powered version of the non-AMG SL-Class models. It uses a V12 engine which produced 368 kW (500 PS; 493 hp) and 800 N⋅m (590 lb⋅ft) from 2003 through 2006 and was uprated to 380 kW (517 PS; 510 hp) and 830 N⋅m (610 lb⋅ft) for 2007. It accelerates from 0–100 km/h (62 mph) in 4.7 seconds, according to Mercedes-Benz. However, Car and Driver achieved more impressive acceleration test figures, with 60 mph (97 km/h) achieved in 3.6 seconds, 100 mph (161 km/h) in 8.6 seconds and a quarter mile run in 11.9 seconds at 120 mph (193 km/h). Production of the SL 600 ended in 2011, leaving the SL 65 AMG as the only V12-engined R230 and R231.

=== Engines ===
Model	Years	Type/code	Power@rpm	Torque@rpm
SL 350	2002–2006	3,724 cubic centimetres (227.3 cu in) V6 (M112)	245 PS (180 kW; 242 hp)@5700	350 N⋅m (258 lbf⋅ft) @3000–4500
SL 500	2002–2006	4,966 cubic centimetres (303.0 cu in) V8 (M113)	306 PS (225 kW; 302 hp)@5600	460 N⋅m (339 lbf⋅ft) @2700–4250
SL 55 AMG	2002–2006	5,439 cubic centimetres (331.9 cu in) V8 supercharged (M113K)	500 PS (368 kW; 493 hp)@6100	700 N⋅m (516 lbf⋅ft) @2650–4500
SL 600	2003–2006	5,513 cubic centimetres (336.4 cu in) V12 biturbo (M275)	500 PS (368 kW; 493 hp)@5000	800 N⋅m (590 lbf⋅ft) @1800–3600
SL 65 AMG	2004–2006	5,980 cubic centimetres (365 cu in) V12 biturbo (M275 AMG)	612 PS (450 kW; 604 hp)@4800–5100	1,000 N⋅m (738 lbf⋅ft) @2000–4000

== 2006 facelift ==
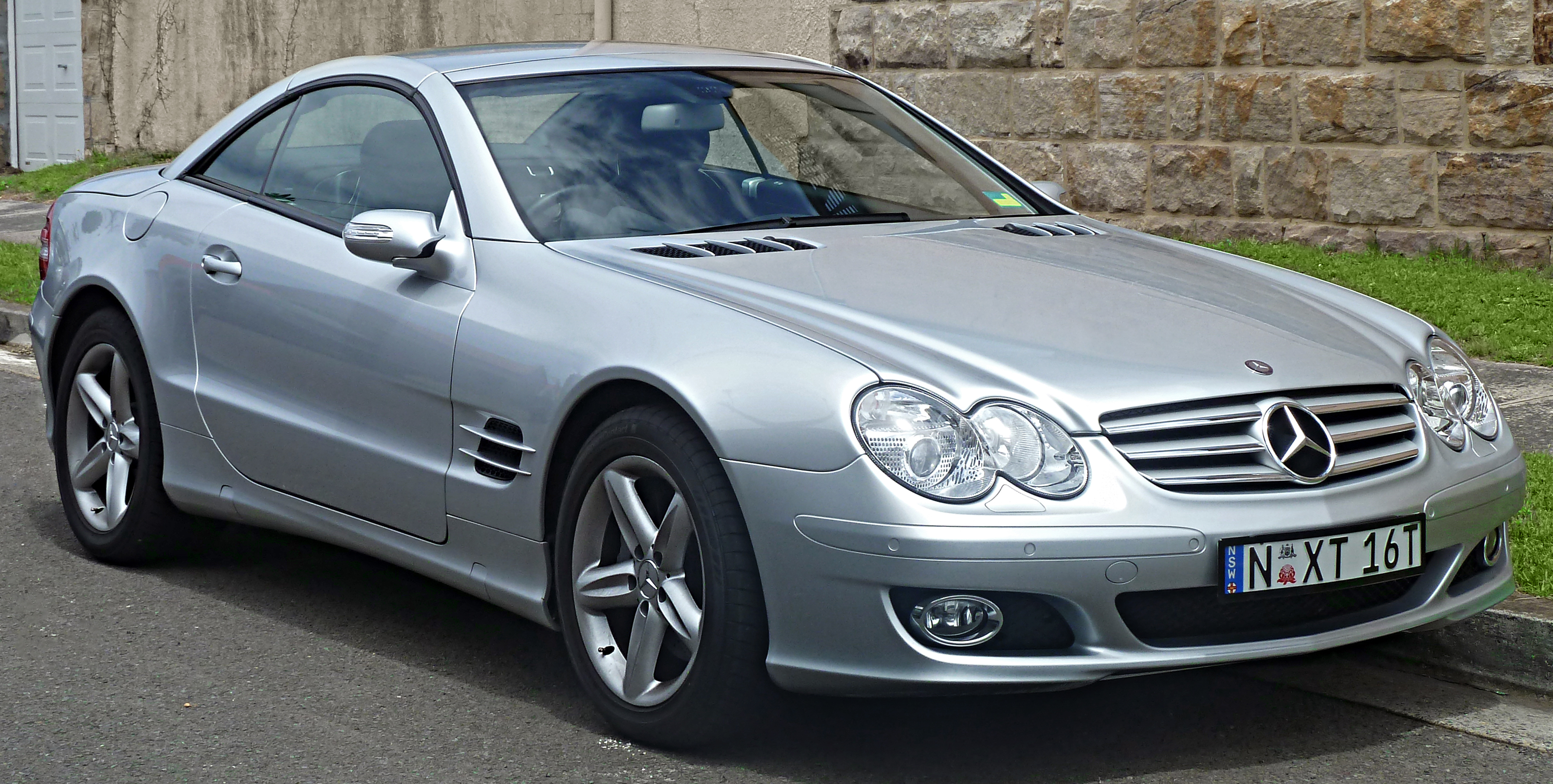
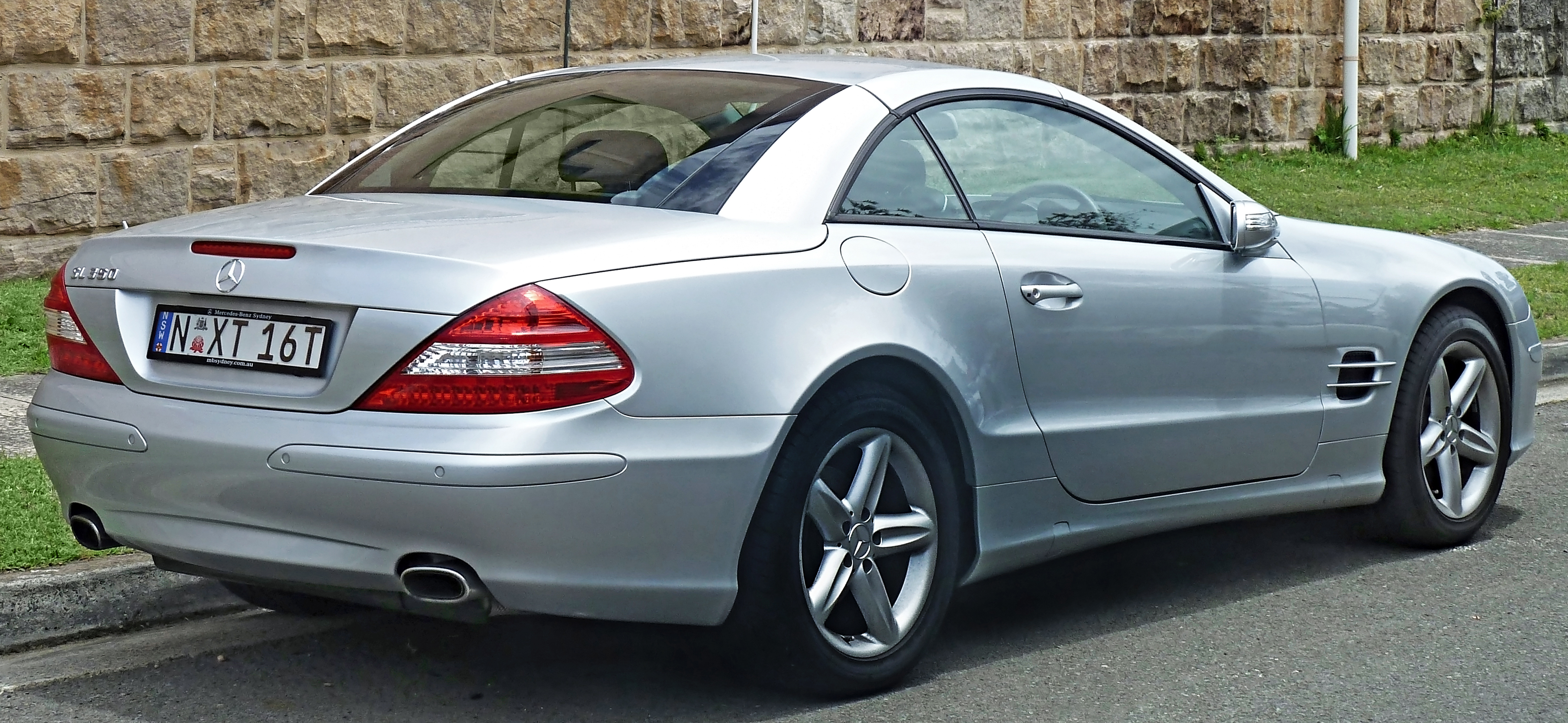
2006 facelift

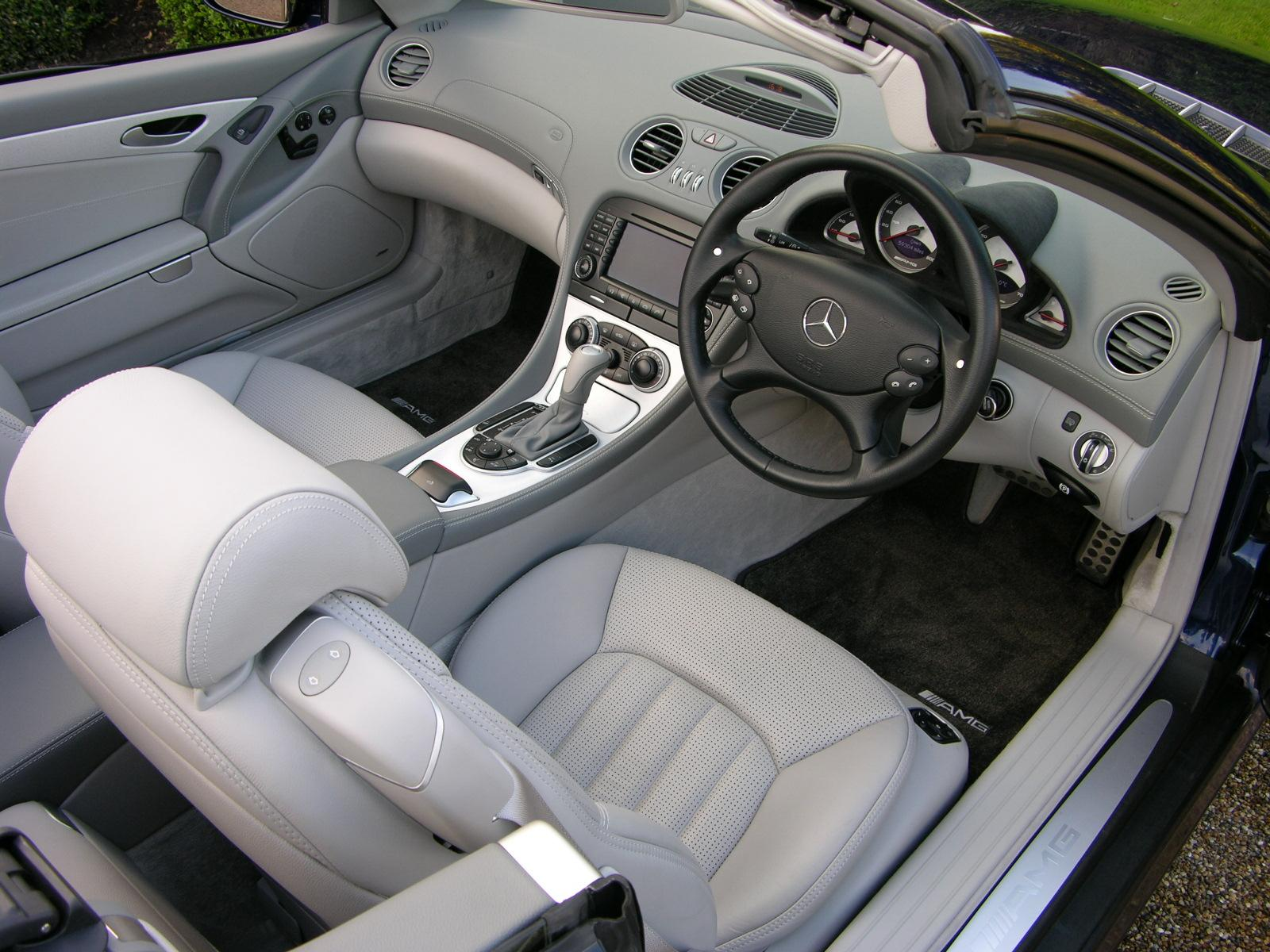
2006 facelift interior (SL 55 AMG)

The SL underwent a facelift in 2006, and was unveiled at the 2006 Geneva Motor Show.

Changes include new engines for SL 350 and SL 500 (called SL 550 in North America), with improved performance on SL 55 AMG and SL 600, as well as a new top-of-the-line SL 65 AMG. ABC (Active Body Control) was improved to reduce body movements in dynamic driving by up to 60%, standard on all models except the SL 350. The ABC system consists of a high-pressure hydraulic pump, four hydraulic struts with electronic sensors, pressure accumulators, a pulsation damper, valve blocks, and a hydraulic fluid reservoir with filter, operating at pressures exceeding 200 bar. Regular maintenance includes hydraulic fluid and filter replacement every two years or 20,000 km. The new engines were mated to a new 7-speed 7G-Tronic automatic, with a Sport option to allow shifting to be performed up to 30% faster in manual "M" mode, and with added steering-wheel shift paddles.

Exterior styling changes include a new bumper with three large cooling air intakes and a more pronounced V-shape as well as fog lamps with chrome surrounds, new light-alloy wheels, new rear light. Interior changes include softer leather upholstery, new interior colours, high-quality metal door sills with Mercedes-Benz lettering and embossed aluminium trim elements, removable luggage cover, optional remote boot-lid release. The roof opening mechanism was also revised, reducing the opening time from 20 seconds to 16 seconds.

=== Engines ===
Model	Years	Type/code	Power@rpm	Torque@rpm
SL 350	2006–2008	3,498 cubic centimetres (213.5 cu in) V6 (M272)	272 PS (200 kW; 268 hp)@6000	350 N⋅m (258 lbf⋅ft) @2400–5000
SL 500, SL 550	2006–2008	5,461 cubic centimetres (333.3 cu in) V8 (M273)	388 PS (285 kW; 383 hp)@6000	530 N⋅m (391 lbf⋅ft) @2800–4800
SL 55 AMG	2006–2008	5,439 cubic centimetres (331.9 cu in) V8 supercharged (M113K)	517 PS (380 kW; 510 hp)@6100	720 N⋅m (531 lbf⋅ft) @2600–4000
SL 600	2006–2008	5,513 cubic centimetres (336.4 cu in) V12 biturbo (M275)	517 PS (380 kW; 510 hp)@5000	830 N⋅m (612 lbf⋅ft) @1900–3500
SL 65 AMG	2006–2008	5,980 cubic centimetres (365 cu in) V12 biturbo (M275 AMG)	612 PS (450 kW; 604 hp)@4800–5100	1,000 N⋅m (738 lbf⋅ft) @2000–4000

== Models ==
=== SL 55 AMG ===
The SL 55 AMG version was released in 2002.

The new model only has slight visual differences compared to previous models; the most noticeable being the three-slat grille rather than the four-slat version used previously. The top speed is limited to 250 km/h (155 mph), but can be extended to 300 km/h (186 mph) for an additional cost. The 6.2 litre V8 replaced the current engine for the 2009 model year. Mercedes engineers claimed that the SL 55 AMG could reach 208 mph without an electronic speed limiter which, in 2002, would have made it the fastest car with a conventional automatic transmission in the world until the SLR Mclaren hit the market in 2003.

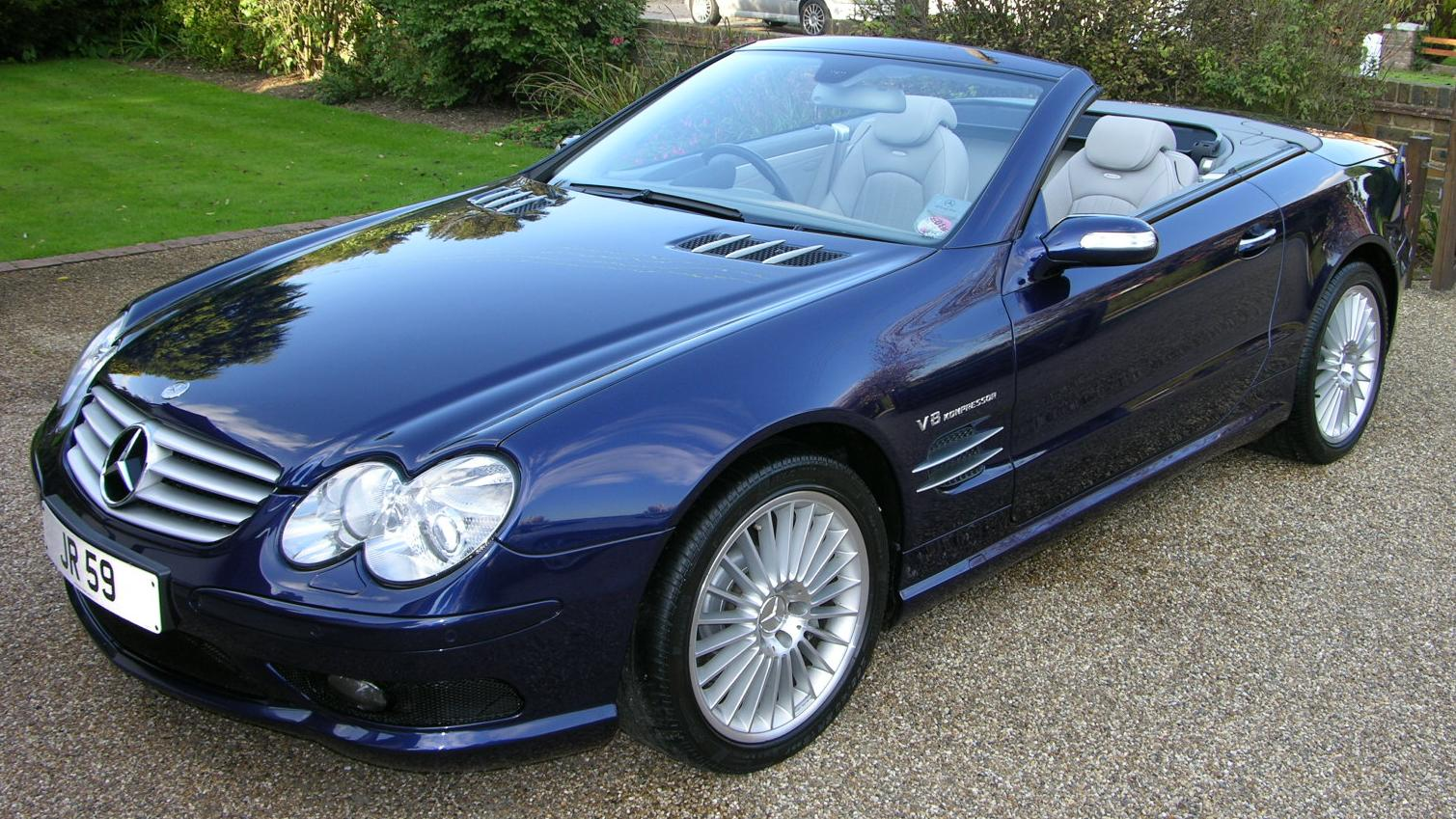
SL 55 AMG (2002–2006)

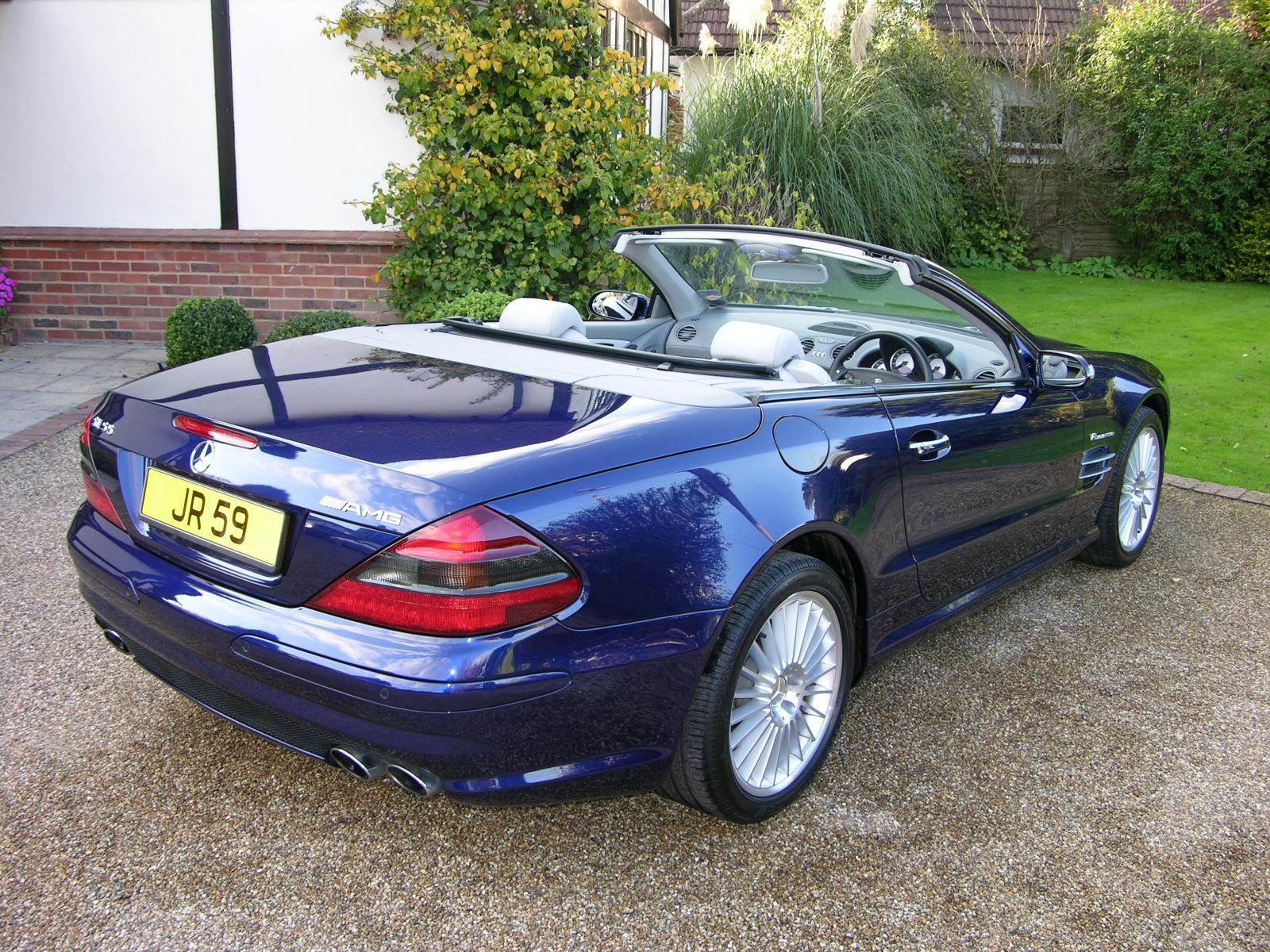
SL 55 AMG (2002–2006)

=== SL 65 AMG ===
The SL 65 AMG was released in 2004.

The SL 65 AMG version produces 604 hp (450 kW) at 5500 rpm from its twin-turbocharged 5,980 cc V12 engine. It retailed for $179,720 in 2005. Mercedes-Benz listed a 0–60 mph (97 km/h) time of 4.2 seconds on their official website, though several road tests show that it actually takes under 4 seconds to reach 60 mph (97 km/h). Car and Driver achieved 60 mph (97 km/h) from a standstill in 3.8 seconds, 100 mph (161 km/h) in 8.2 seconds and recorded a quarter mile time of 11.9 seconds at 123 mph (198 km/h).

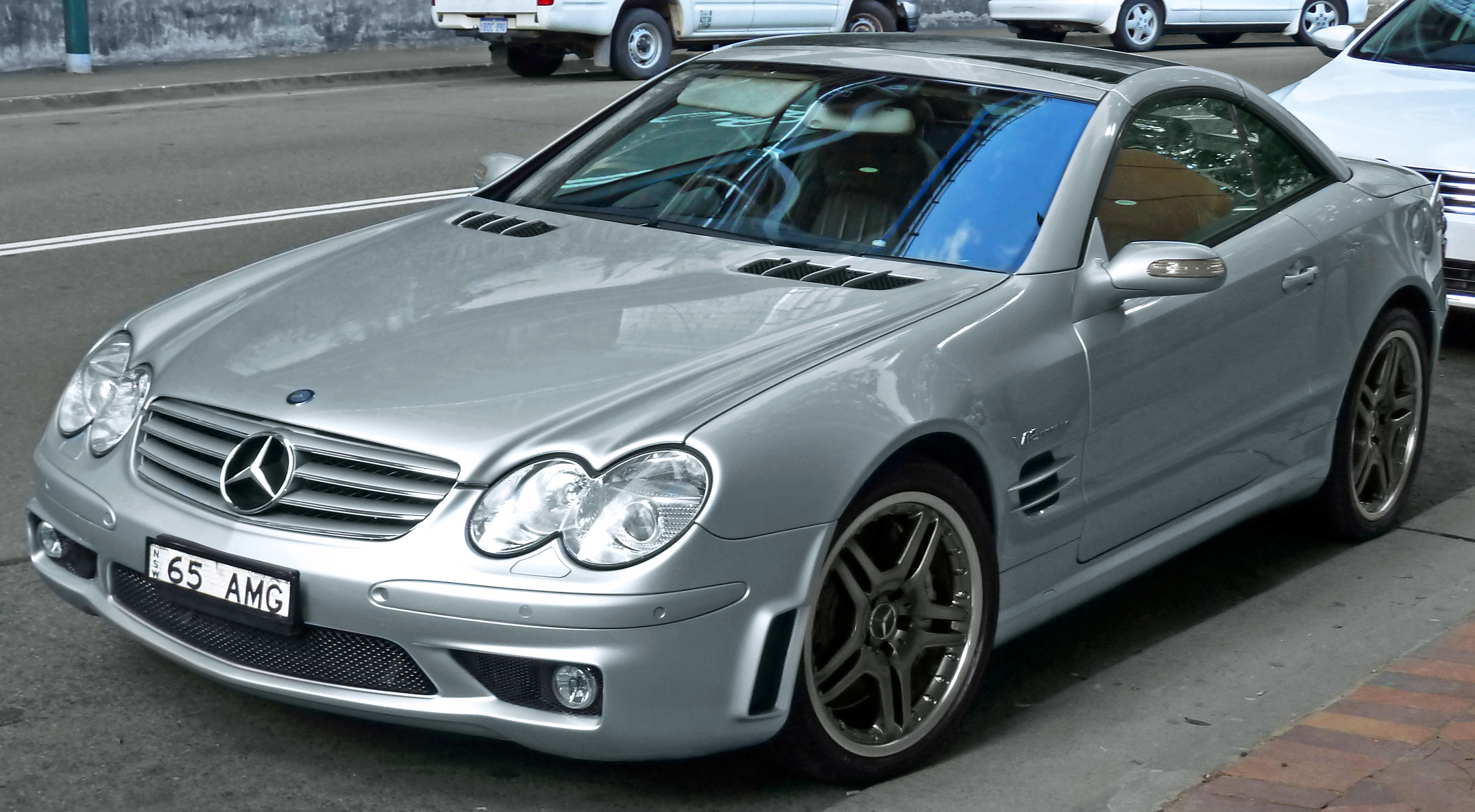
SL 65 AMG

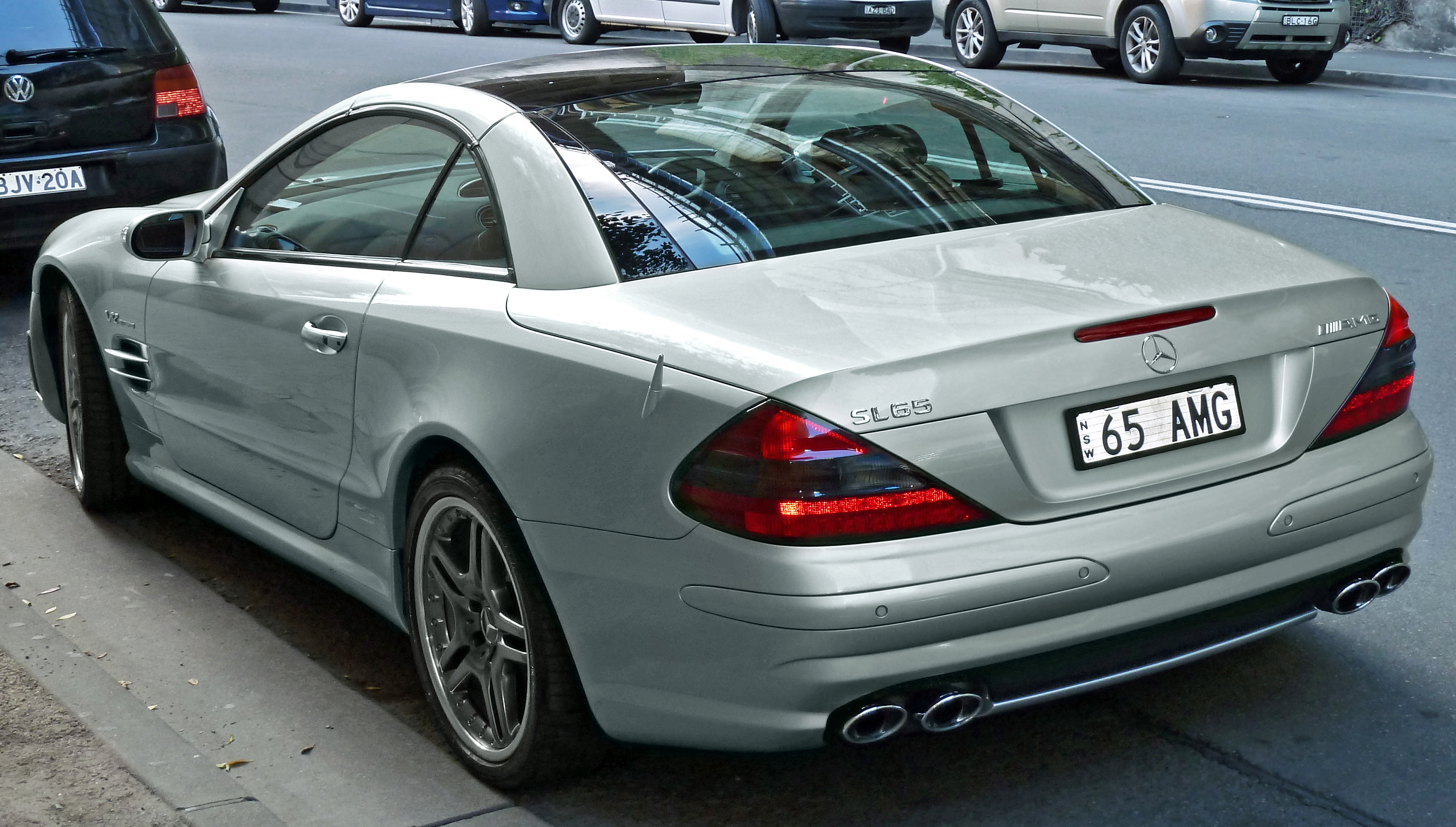
SL 65 AMG

=== SL 550 50th Anniversary ===
In 2007, Mercedes created a limited-edition 50th Anniversary SL 550. All of the cars were pewter in colour with burgundy leather, black ash wood trim, 18-inch double five-spoked wheels, and matching 50th Anniversary Edition luggage. Sources differ on how many were produced, with some claiming 75, 500, or 550 cars were built.

== 2008 facelift ==
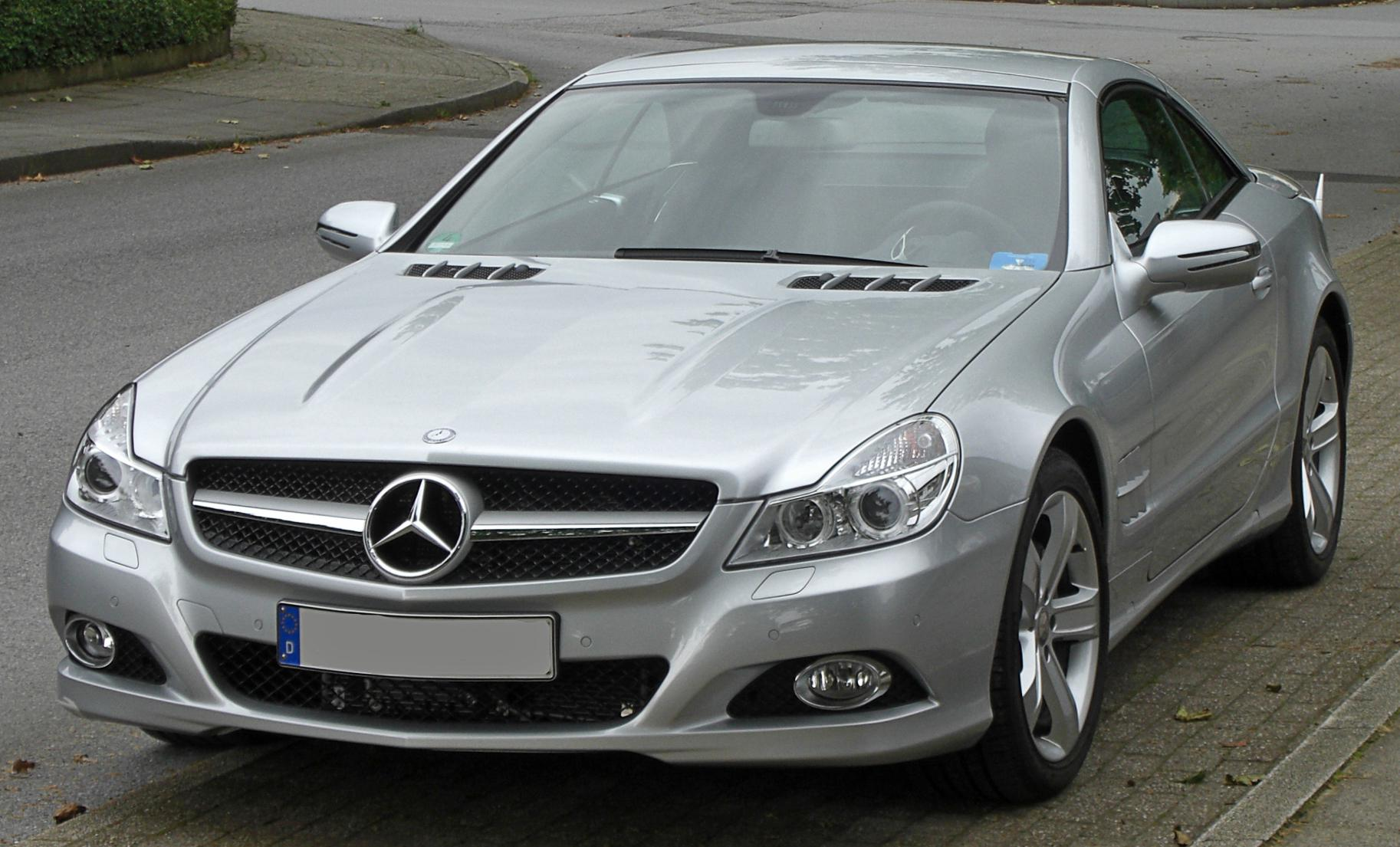
2008 facelift

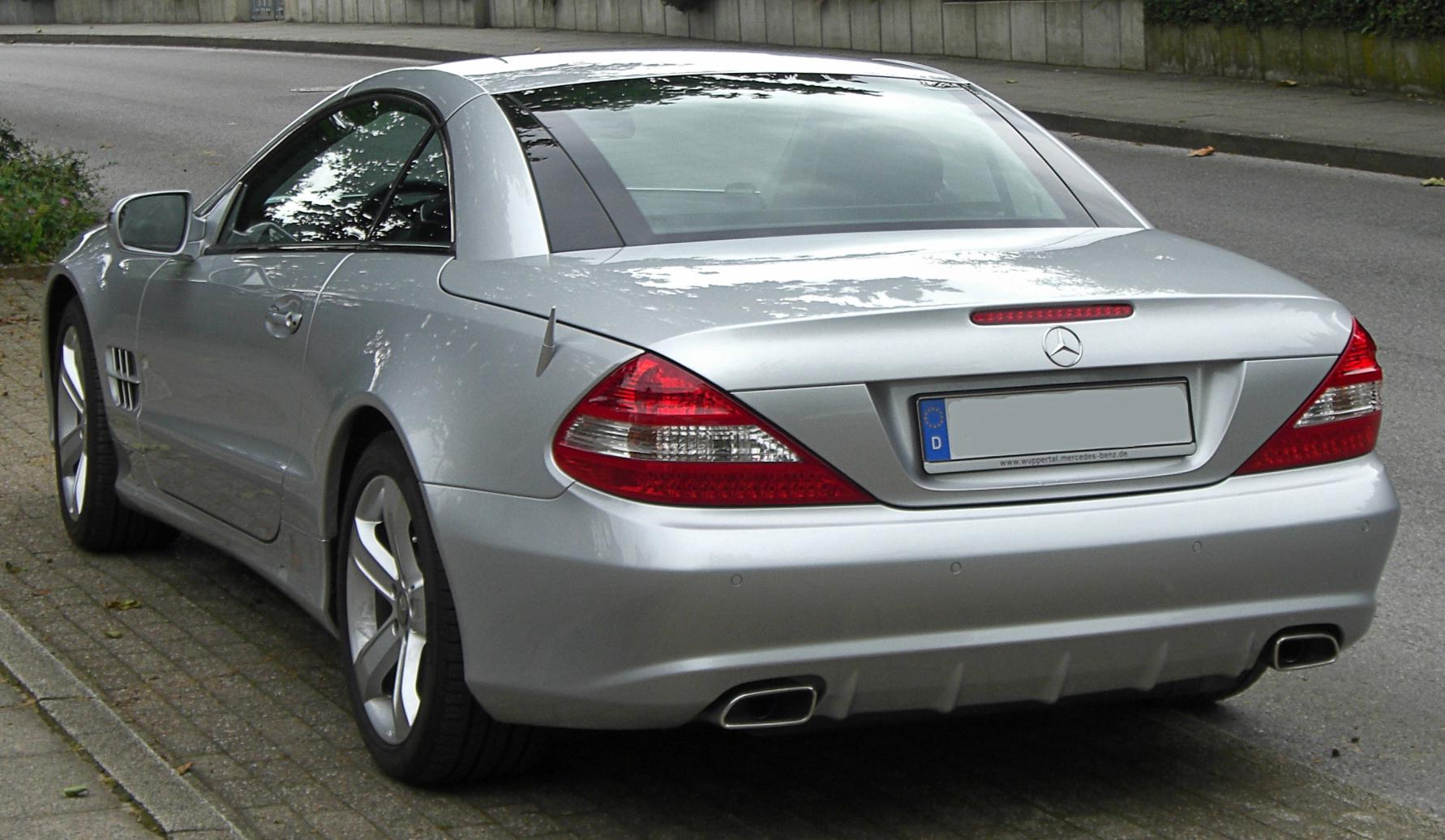
2008 facelift

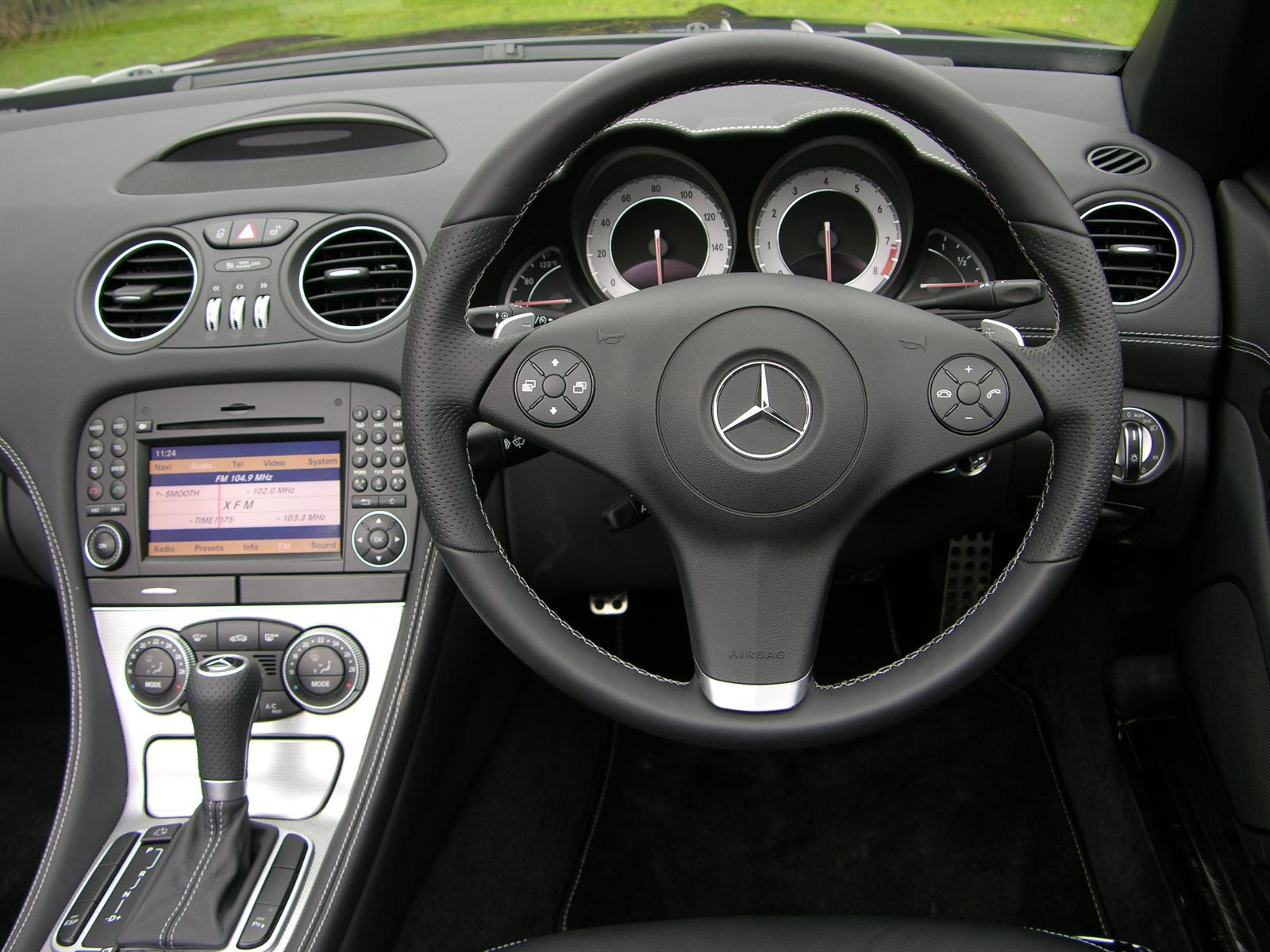
Interior (2008 facelift)

The facelifted SL model was revealed at the Geneva Motor Show in March 2008. The SL received a new, more aggressive front end reflecting Mercedes's new design philosophy, with a pair of long powerdomes on the bonnet and a single-bar grille replacing the old three-bar effort. Improvements have been made also to the engines. The 3.5 L V6 is uprated to 311 PS (229 kW; 307 hp) at 6500 rpm. Compared to the previous 3.5-litre engine, the output has been boosted by 16 percent. Torque has also been improved adding 10 N⋅m (7.4 lb⋅ft) to the previous 350 N⋅m (258 lbf⋅ft) making it 360 N⋅m (266 lbf⋅ft). This engine now can rev up to a max of 7200 rpm for a period as the oil temperature and other engine parameters permit, a higher compression ratio, a new intake manifold and featuring extensive modifications to and lightening of the valve train. In this case, however, the extra power does not come at the expense of fuel economy: with a consumption figure of 9.9 litres per 100 kilometres, the new SL 350 undercuts the previous model developing 200 kW (272 PS; 268 hp) by 0.4 litres per 100 kilometres. Mercedes-Benz also extended the SL-Class line-up by introducing the entry-level SL 280 model developing 170 kW (231 PS; 228 hp). The six cylinder powerplant delivers its peak torque of 300 N⋅m (221 lbf⋅ft) from 2500 rpm and accelerates the roadster from 0 to 100 km/h (62 mph) in 7.8 seconds, whilst fuel consumption (NEDC) is 9.4 L/100 km (30 mpg_{‑imp}; 25 mpg_{‑US}). It features the AIRSCARF heating system used in the SLK.

=== SL 63 AMG ===
The facelifted SL 63 AMG loses AMG's 5.4 L M113 in favour of the newer M156 6.2 L V8 used in the S 63 AMG, CLK 63 AMG, E 63 AMG, and C 63 AMG. It produces 525 PS (386 kW; 518 hp) at 6800 rpm and 630 N⋅m (465 lbf⋅ft) of torque at 5200 rpm. It can accelerate from 0 to 100 km/h (62 mph) in 4.6 seconds, going up to a limited top speed of 250 km/h (155 mph). The SL 63 AMG engine was built by Mercedes-AMG. The SL 63 AMG also includes the new AMG-developed 7-speed MCT "Multi Clutch Technology" automatic transmission.

The new MCT transmission is essentially the 7G-Tronic transmission without a torque converter. Instead of a torque converter, it uses a compact wet startup clutch to start the car off, and also supports computer-controlled double declutching. The MCT (Multi-Clutch Technology) acronym refers to a planetary (automatic) transmission's multiple clutches and bands for each gear.

The MCT is fitted with four drive modes: "C" (Comfort), "S" (Sport), "S+" (Sport plus), and "M" (Manual) and boasts 100 millisecond shifts in "M" mode. The new car features the new AMG DRIVE UNIT with innovative Race Start function. The AMG DRIVE UNIT is the central control unit for the AMG SPEEDSHIFT MCT 7-speed sports transmission and all driving dynamics functions. The driver can change gears either using the new AMG selector lever with its leather/ carbon-fibre finish, or by nudging the AMG steering-wheel shift paddles. The new Race start Function is a launch control system which enables the SL 63 AMG driver to call on maximum acceleration, while ensuring optimum traction of the driven wheels. A modified version of the SL 63 was the Safety Car for the Formula One seasons of 2008 and 2009.

=== SL 63 AMG Edition IWC (2008) ===
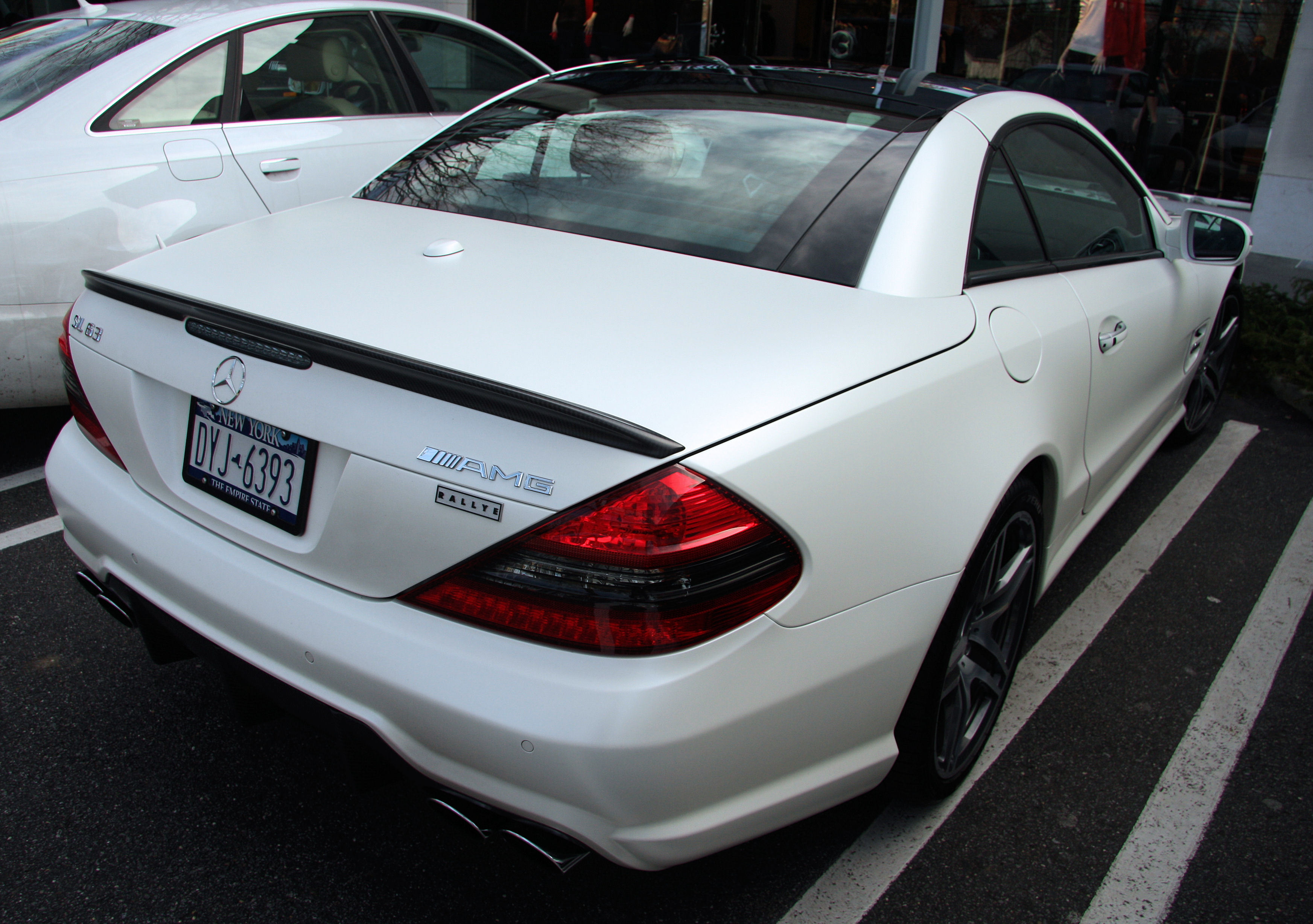
SL 63 AMG Edition IWC

The Edition IWC is a limited (200 units) version of the SL 63 AMG which included Designo Magno Kashmir white finish, AMG exterior carbon package with matte surface, interior carbon matte trim with Tobago Brown nappa leather upholstery, AMG Performance package, and a 'Grosse Ingenieur' (Big Engineer) watch from Swiss watchmaker IWC Schaffhausen.

The vehicle went on sale beginning in fall 2008, with deliveries beginning in November 2008.

=== SL 65 AMG Black Series (2008–2011) ===
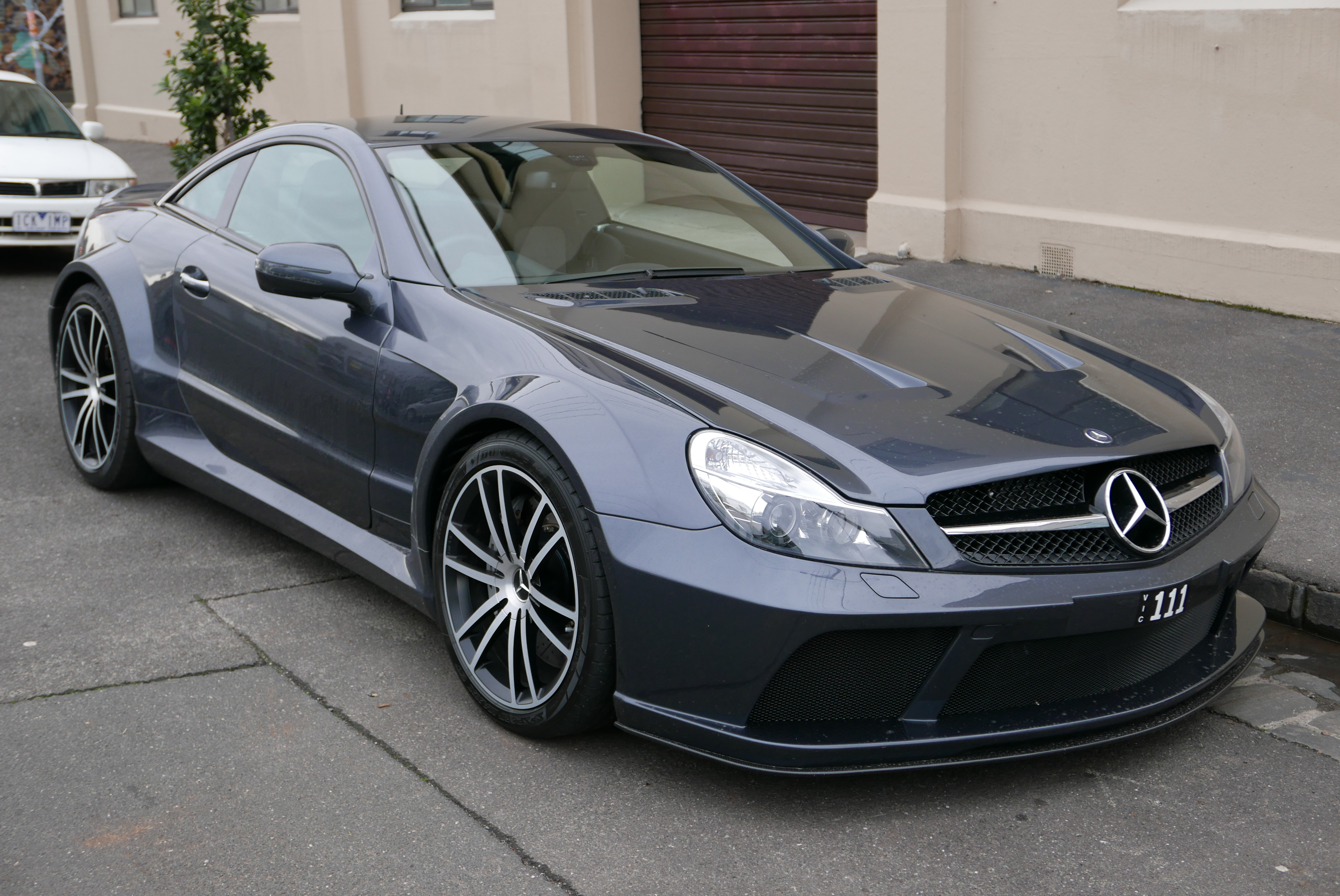
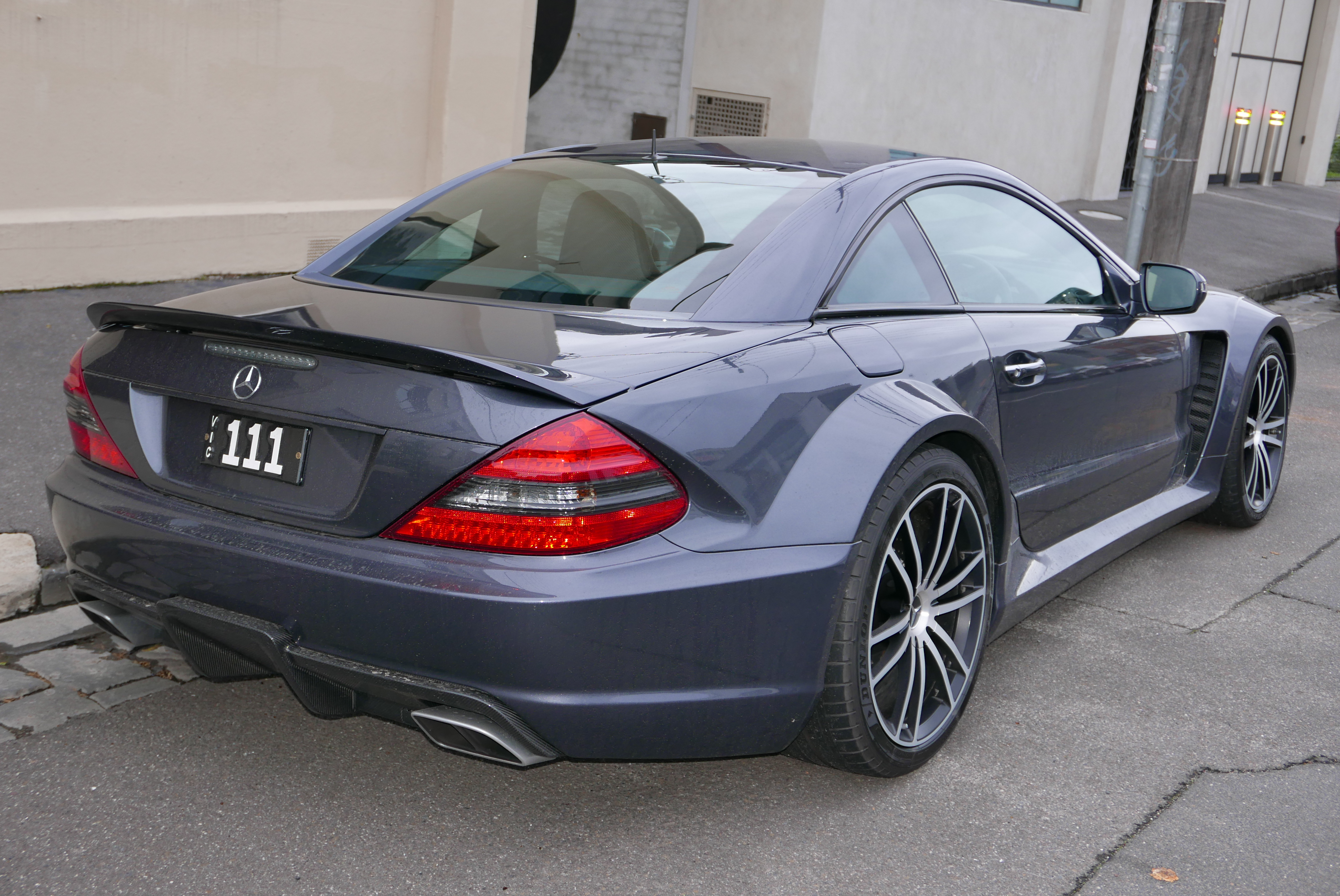
Mercedes-Benz SL 65 AMG Black Series

The high performance Black Series version of the SL 65 AMG was unveiled in Monterey in 2008. The turbochargers are 12% larger, and the optimised wastegate ducts permit increased air throughout. The intake air ducting and exhaust system are modified to improve response and reduce the exhaust gas backpressure. These engine improvements result in a 58 PS (43 kW; 57 hp) higher power output than the standard AMG model.

The Black Series is 250 kg (551 lb) lighter than the regular SL 65 AMG through the use of light carbon fibre composite (CFRP) parts and the omission of the SL's normal foldable hardtop roof, which it replaced with a fixed roof. Not only did this save weight, it also made room available for the retractable rear spoiler.

The SL 65 AMG Black Series has a limited top speed of about 200 mph (322 km/h) and can accelerate from 0–62 mph (0–100 km/h) in 3.8 seconds.

The AMG Speedshift Plus five-speed automatic transmission include "C", "S", "M1", and "M2" which has gearshift times 25 percent quicker than the "M1" mode. The Black Series front axle track width is 97 mm wider and the rear axle track width 85 mm wider over regular model. Other changes include retractable rear spoiler and the rear apron with diffuser fins, 265/35R19 front tyres with 19×9.5 inch AMG light-alloy wheels and AMG 20×11.5-inch light-alloy wheels with 325/30R20 tyres (Dunlop Sport Maxx GT tyres), 6-piston front calipers with 390×36mm discs and 4-piston calipers with 360×26mm discs, and a special coilover suspension setup developed by KW.

A total of 350 Black Series were made, with half (175) destined for the US market.

=== SL Night Edition (2010) ===
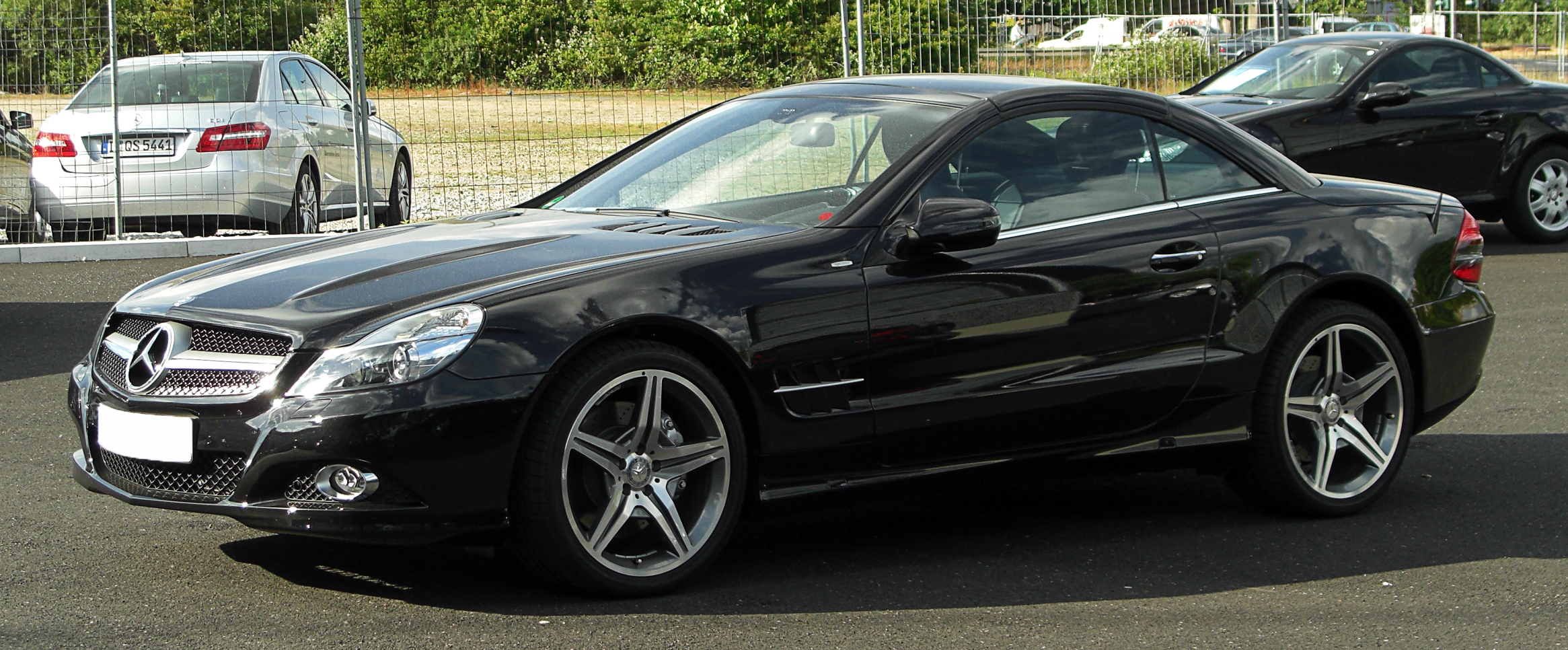
SL 350 Night Edition (2008 facelift)

The Night Edition is a version of the SL roadster finished in designo magno night matte black paint with 19-inch AMG five-spoke light-alloy wheels in a two-tone high-gloss finish, silver-painted front brake calipers with the Mercedes-Benz logo, darkened headlamps/tail lights, black nappa leather upholstery with shining chrome trim, seats with arrow-shaped seams and silver-coloured contrasting features, sports steering wheel and shift lever and roof lining in black, trim strip of the draught-stop in a high-gloss finish, and silver-coloured vents on the AIRSCARF system. Available only for the 2011 model year, 100 cars were made.

=== Grand Edition (2011) ===
The Grand Edition is a special edition commemorating the 125th anniversary of Karl Benz inventing the automobile; it was available on the SL 300, SL 350, and SL 500 .

The SL 350 Grand Edition included 19-inch AMG 5-spoke alloy wheels in titanium, front brake calipers with the Mercedes-Benz logo, drill bench rated brake discs, twin chrome square exhaust tips, chrome shoulder line trim, high gloss door handle, Grand Edition side emblem, nappa leather seats, SLR design shift knob, prism pattern aluminium trim, silver colour AIRSCARF vent, chrome door sill plate, chrome draught strap, floor mat with Grand Edition logo, and ashtray with Grand Edition logo. Other options include an AMG sport package and designo piano lacquer black wood trim.

The SL 500 Grand Edition included 19-inch AMG 5-spoke alloy wheel in titanium, front brake calipers with the Mercedes-Benz logo, drill bench rated brake discs, twin chrome square exhaust tips, chrome shoulder line trim, high gloss door handle, Grand Edition side emblem, SLR design shift knob, designo piano lacquer black wood trim, silver colour AIRSCARF vent, chrome door sill plate, chrome draught strap, floor mat with Grand Edition logo, and ashtray with Grand Edition logo. Other options include an AMG sport package.

The Japan model went on sale in 2011-08-05.

=== Engines ===
Model	Years	Displacement	Type/code	Power @ rpm	Torque @ rpm
SL 280	2007–2009	3.0 L (2,996 cc)	V6 (M272)	231 PS (170 kW; 228 hp) @ 6000	300 N⋅m (221 lbf⋅ft) @ 2500–5000
SL 300	2009–2011	3.0 L (2,996 cc)	V6 (M272)	231 PS (170 kW; 228 hp) @ 6000	300 N⋅m (221 lbf⋅ft) @ 2500–5000
SL 350	2007–2011	3.5 L (3,498 cc)	V6 (M272)	316 PS (232 kW; 312 hp) @ 6500	360 N⋅m (266 lbf⋅ft) @ 4900
SL 500, SL 550	2008–2011	5.5 L (5,461 cc)	V8 (M273)	388 PS (285 kW; 383 hp) @ 6000	530 N⋅m (391 lbf⋅ft) @ 2800–4800
SL 63 AMG	2007–2011	6.2 L (6,208 cc)	V8 (M156)	525 PS (386 kW; 518 hp) @ 6800	630 N⋅m (465 lbf⋅ft) @ 5250
SL 600	2008–2011	5.5 L (5,513 cc)	V12 BiTurbo (M275)	517 PS (380 kW; 510 hp) @ 5000	830 N⋅m (612 lbf⋅ft) @ 1900–3500
SL 65 AMG	2008–2010	6.0 L (5,980 cc)	V12 BiTurbo (M275 AMG)	612 PS (450 kW; 604 hp) @ 4800–5100	1,000 N⋅m (738 lbf⋅ft) @ 2000–4000
SL 65 AMG Black Series	2008–2009	6.0 L (5,980 cc)	V12 BiTurbo (M275 AMG)	670 PS (493 kW; 661 hp) @ 5400	1,000 N⋅m (738 lbf⋅ft) @ 2200–4200

=== Transmissions ===
The SL 63 AMG includes AMG SPEEDSHIFT MCT 7-speed sports transmission, which included 'C' (Comfort), 'S' (Sport), 'S+' (Sport plus) and 'M' (Manual) modes, AMG DRIVE UNIT, Race Start launch control.
