= Renntech =

US automotive aftermarket company

- Type: Private
- Industry: Automotive
- Founded: 1989
- Headquarters: Stuart, Florida, United States
- Products: Automobiles
- Website: Renntech

Renntech Inc. is an American high-performance automotive aftermarket tuning company founded in 1989, with their headquarters located in Stuart, Florida. RENNtech specializes in engineering, designing and manufacturing parts for Mercedes-Benz, AMG, Maybach and Mercedes-Benz Sprinter vehicles as well as other European luxury and performance vehicles. RENNtech also operates a full motorsport division named RENNtech Motorsports fielding a Mercedes-AMG GT4 racecar in SRO's North American GT -series. RENNtech Classics was founded to offer a wider range of services for owners of early RENNtech, Pre-Merger AMG, and collectible Mercedes-Benz vehicles.

== History ==
RENNtech was founded by Hartmut Feyhl in 1989 as a result of the AMG Mercedes-Benz merger. Prior to the merger, Feyhl spent 12 years at AMG, first as a part of the team developing the Mercedes-Benz 300E 6.0 AMG "Hammer" and later serving as that company's Technical Director at AMG North America in Westmont, Illinois.

Feyhl named the company RENNtech, combining the German word for racing renn and technology, and continued to service AMG's North American customer base from Florida while maintaining a connection to AMG's headquarters, and Hans-Werner Aufrecht and Erhard Melcher.

RENNtech has designed and developed high-performance products for virtually all Mercedes-Benz AMG vehicles since 1989 (including the commercial Mercedes-Benz Sprinter van). The company received considerable press with the RENNtech E7.4RS, and the 2006 "Chrome SL" show car, an SL-based project entirely covered in chrome paint. RENNtech cars are often featured on social media, blogs, and on the covers of major automotive magazines including Car and Driver, eMercedesBenz, Motor Trend, AutoWeek, and Modified Luxury & Exotics.

== Operations ==
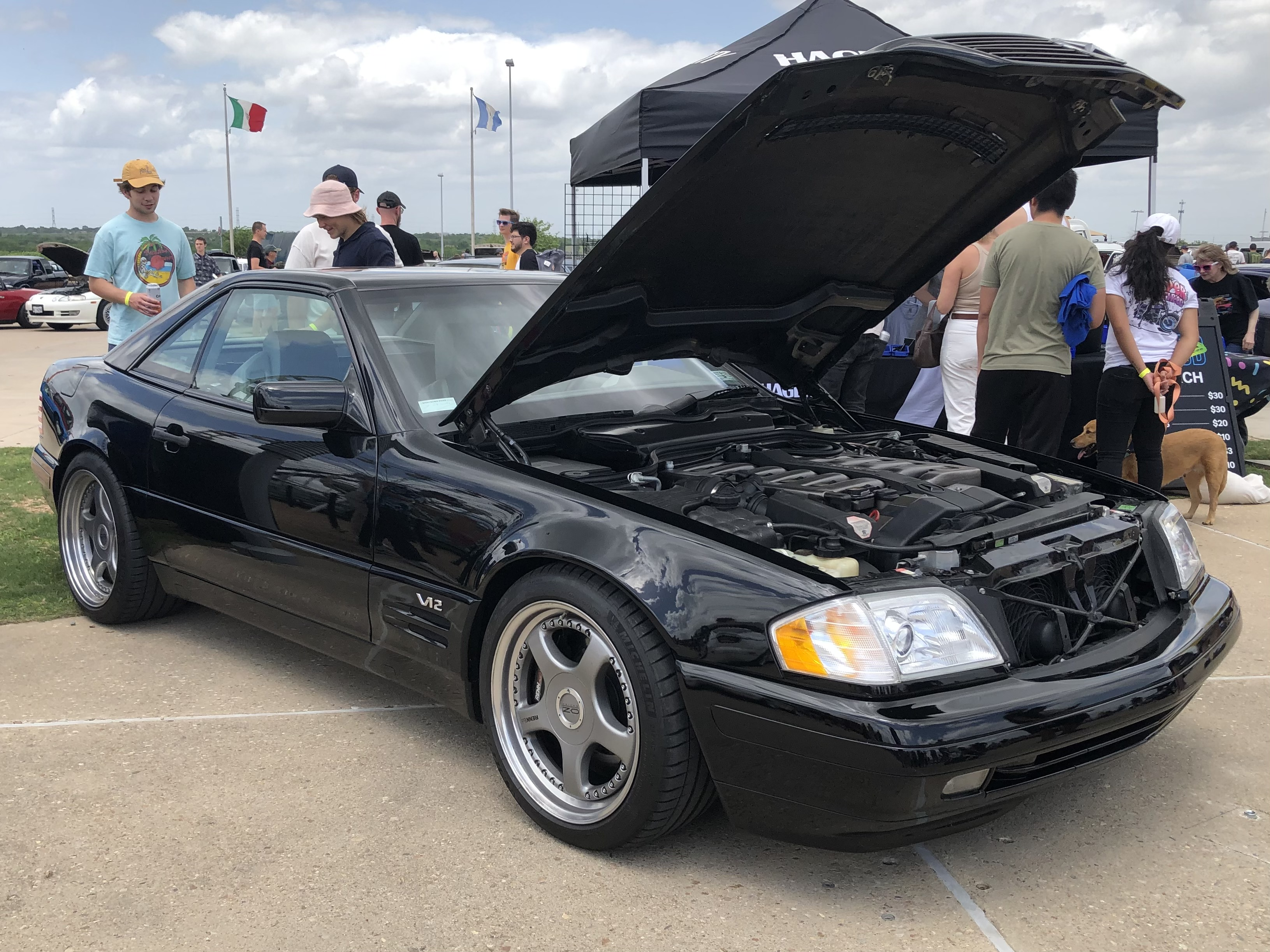
1997 Mercedes-Benz SL600 RENNTech SL74

RENNtech is a Mercedes-Benz specialist, and Feyhl himself is the foremost authority on Mercedes tuning in the United States.

Following the 1998 merger of Daimler-Benz and Chrysler Corp. (which became DaimlerChrysler later), RENNtech expanded into the Chrysler category developing performance upgrades for the Chrysler Crossfire. In 2013, when Mercedes-AMG entered a strategic partnership to produce V8 engines for Aston Martin, RENNtech followed suit by creating performance upgrades for the M177 powered Aston Martin Vehicles.

RENNtech engines range from small 200 horsepower (150 kW) K4 blocks for SLK roadsters and CLK-Class to the 1198 horsepower (670 kW) twin-turbo M177 -engine for the AMG GT63 4-Door Coupe.

== Renntech Karting ==
Renntech Karting is a division that makes racing karts, based on the Aixro XR50 rotary engines.

== List of RENNtech vehicles ==
Mercedes-Benz

- SLR McLaren
- AMG GT63 4-Door Coupe RIIIx
- SLR McLaren 777 Concept
- 190E 3.6L W201 (1990)
- C74 Konzept W204
- SL600 R230
- S550 W222
- S550 W221
- S600 W220
- CL65 AMG W216
- CL500 K W216
- CLS55 AMG W219
- E7.4RS W210
- S700 Coupe C140
- SLR7.4 R129
- E63 AMG W211
- CLK55 AMG W209
- SLK32 AMG R170
- SLK55 AMG R171
- C38 W203
- C43 AMG W202
- C55 AMG W203
- C63 AMG W204
- G500 W463
- GL 550 X164
- GLK350 Hybrid Pikes Peak (2009)
- ML 60 W163
- ML 550 W164
- Sprinter (2008)
- 500E W124

Smart

- Smart Fortwo (2009)

Maybach

- Maybach 62

AIXRO

- SLR.Kart
