= Mercedes-AMG =

High-performance subsidiary of Mercedes-Benz AG

Coordinates: 48.9186739°N 9.3232478°E

Mercedes-AMG GmbH
- Type: Subsidiary (GmbH)
- Industry: Automotive
- Founded: 1967; 59 years ago (as AMG Motorenbau und Entwicklungsgesellschaft mbH); Burgstall a. d. Murr, Germany
- Founders: Hans Werner Aufrecht; Erhard Melcher
- Fate: Acquired by DaimlerChrysler (1999), and operating under Daimler AG
- Headquarters: Affalterbach, Germany
- Area served: Worldwide
- Key people: Michael Schiebe (Chairman of the Board)
- Products: High performance automobiles
- Services: Research and development
- Number of employees: ~2,900
- Parent: Mercedes-Benz AG
- Website: www.mercedes-amg.com

Mercedes-AMG GmbH, commonly known as AMG (Aufrecht, Melcher, Großaspach), is the high-performance subsidiary of Mercedes-Benz AG. AMG independently hires engineers and contracts with manufacturers to customize Mercedes-Benz AMG vehicles. The company has its headquarters in Affalterbach, Baden-Württemberg, Germany.

AMG was originally an independent engineering firm specializing in performance improvements for Mercedes-Benz vehicles. DaimlerChrysler AG took a controlling interest in 1999, then became the sole owner of AMG in 2005. Mercedes-AMG GmbH is now a wholly owned subsidiary of Mercedes-Benz AG, which is in turn owned by the Mercedes-Benz Group.

AMG models typically have more aggressive looks, higher performance, better handling, better stability and more carbon fibre than their regular Mercedes-Benz counterparts. AMG models are typically the most expensive and highest-performing variant of each Mercedes-Benz class. AMG has also made special variants of some Mitsubishi and Honda models.

AMG variants are usually badged with two numerals, as opposed to regular Mercedes-Benz vehicles, which have three (e.g. "E 63" as opposed to "E 350"). The numerals do not always indicate engine size, but are rather a tribute to earlier heritage cars, such as the 300 SEL 6.3 litre. For example, newer-model AMG V8s such as the E 63 actually have 4.0L V8s.

The world's first stand-alone Mercedes-AMG dealership, AMG Sydney, was opened in Sydney, Australia in 2018.

== History ==
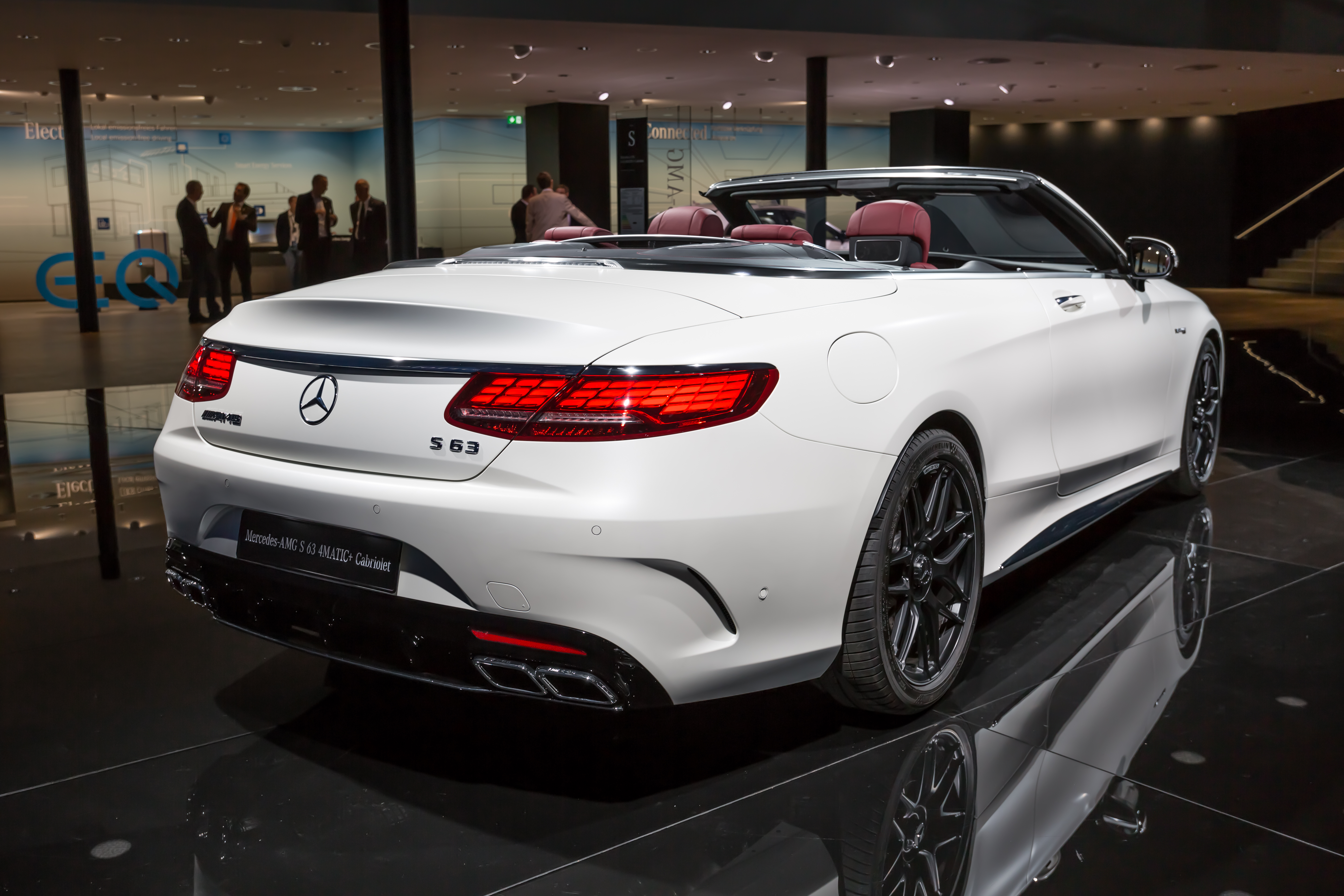
AMG logo on a Mercedes-AMG S 63 Cabriolet (A217)

AMG was established in 1967 as a racing engine manufacturer under the name AMG Motorenbau- und Entwicklungsgesellschaft mbH (translated from German as "AMG Engine Production and Development Limited") by former Mercedes-Benz engineers Hans Werner Aufrecht and Erhard Melcher in Burgstall an der Murr, near Stuttgart. The name "AMG" is derived from the initials of Aufrecht, Melcher, and Großaspach (Aufrecht's birthplace). In 1976, the majority of AMG's operations moved to Affalterbach, with racing-engine development remaining in Burgstall. At this time, Erhard Melcher ceased his partnership but continued working at the Burgstall location.

By 1993, AMG became a high-profile purveyor of modified Mercedes-Benz vehicles. That year, Daimler-Benz AG and AMG entered into a cooperation agreement, enabling AMG to use Daimler-Benz's dealer network and to develop joint vehicles, the first being the Mercedes-Benz C36 AMG.

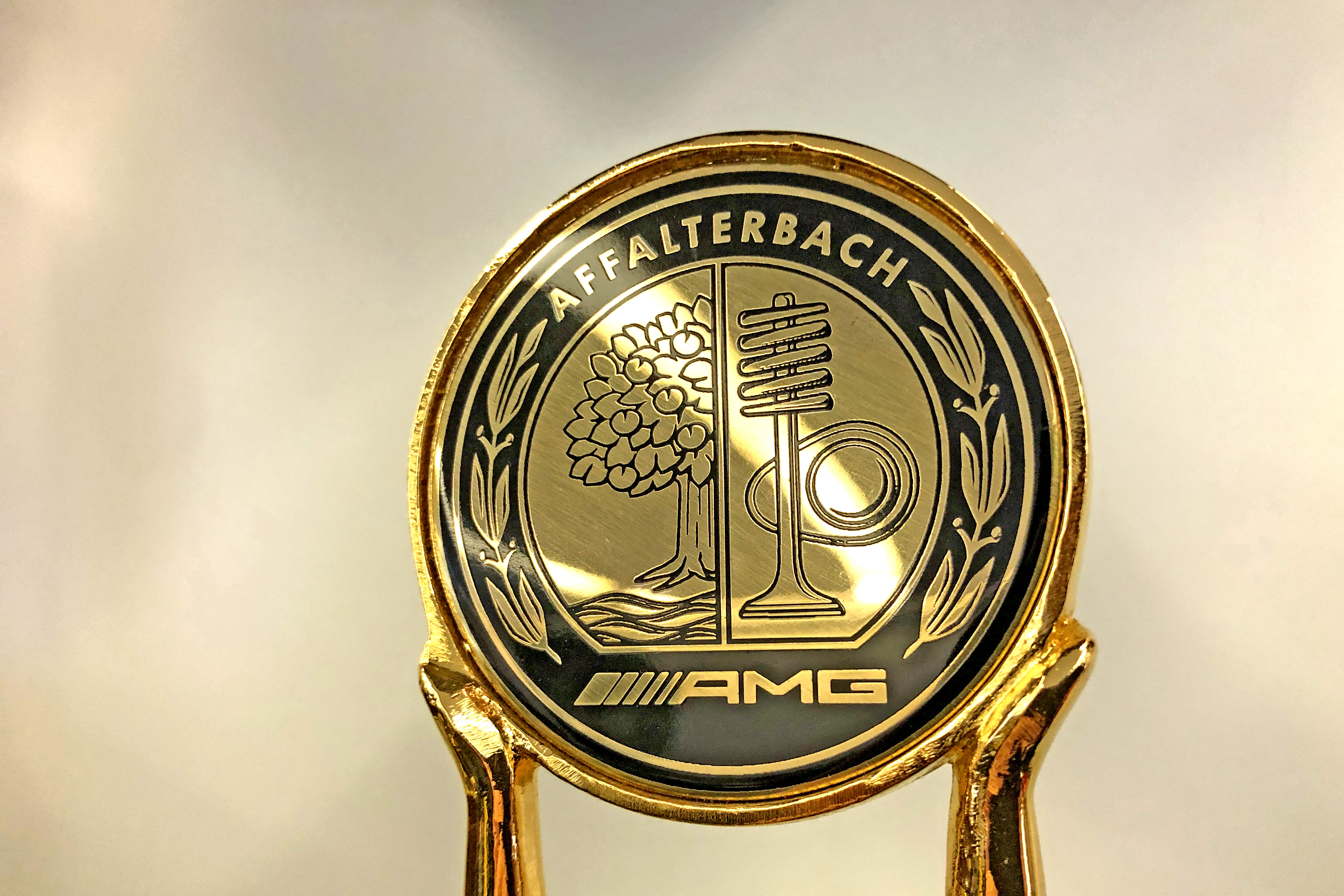
Mercedes AMG Classic Logo

On 1 January 1999, DaimlerChrysler AG (as it was called between 1998 and 2007) acquired 51 percent of AMG shares, and the company was renamed Mercedes-AMG GmbH. The racing engine division was separated and continues to operate in Burgstall under the name HWA, derived from Aufrecht's initials. On 1 January 2005, Aufrecht sold his remaining shares to DaimlerChrysler, and since then, Mercedes-AMG GmbH has been a wholly owned subsidiary of the Mercedes-Benz Group.

=== Development of the product range ===
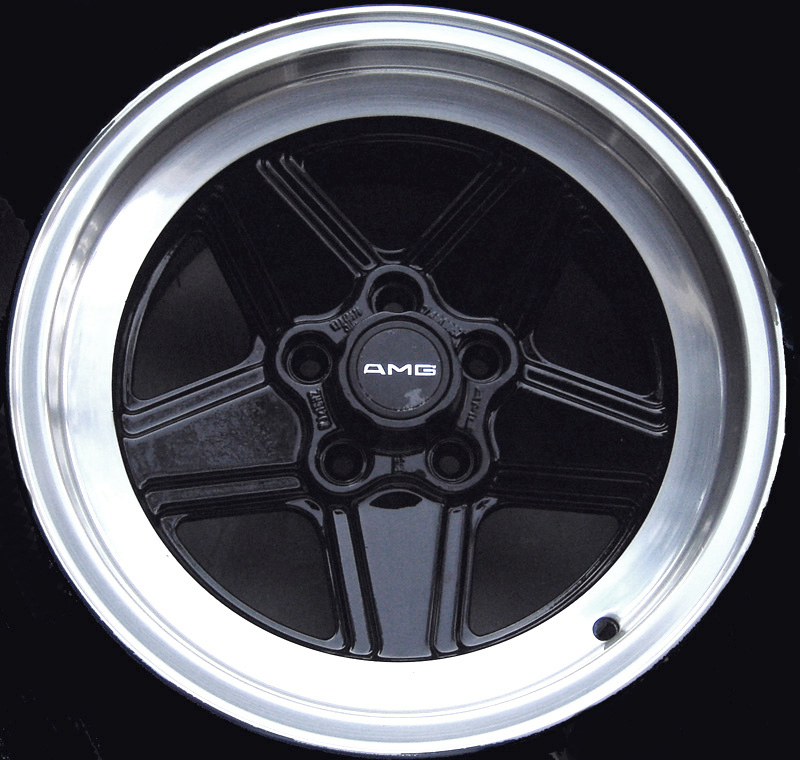
AMG Five Spoke Road Wheel 8JX16 Version 1

AMG started off by designing and testing racing engines. It expanded its business into building custom road cars based upon standard Mercedes cars. AMG initially produced a range of unofficial upgrade and accessories packages mainly for the Mercedes-Benz R107 and C107 (1971–1989 SL roadster), Mercedes-Benz W116 (1972–1980 S-class), Mercedes-Benz W123 (1976–1985 E-class predecessor), Mercedes-Benz W124 (1984–1997 E-class), Mercedes-Benz W126 (1979–1992 S-class), Mercedes-Benz R129 (1989–2001 SL roadster), and Mercedes-Benz W201 (1990–1993 C-class) models.

During the early 1980s and up until 1990, AMG offered a variety of engine performance packages, alloy wheels and styling products as an entirely independent company from Daimler-Benz. In 1990, AMG signed a co-operation agreement with Daimler-Benz, and AMG options and cars were then offered in Mercedes-Benz showrooms; in 1999 Daimler AG, then known as DaimlerChrysler AG, bought the controlling share of AMG and made them part of the official Mercedes-Benz line-up.

Typical AMG performance enhancements, which the buyer could custom order, included increased engine displacements (5.2 litre, 5.4 litre), performance top ends with port and polished heads and intake, lightened valve train, and more aggressive cams. The DOHC 32V engine had also just been developed and was the pinnacle of AMG performance. A Getrag five-speed manual transmission could be ordered from AMG, and Mercedes had not offered a manual transmission V8 since the early 1970s.

The performance wheels offered during the same period were 15-inch or 16-inch ATS AMG Five Spoke Road Wheels, typically coupled with an AMG performance suspension package that included uprated and lowered springs, and re-valved shock absorbers.

Also popular were AMG body kits. These ranged from subtle front spoilers to aggressive Wide Body kits for the W126 coupes (reaching more than $700k on the classic market in 2022). Other options included Recaro seats, smaller diameter steering wheels, instrument clusters, chrome delete option (all brightworks colour-coded or painted satin black), refrigerators, shift knobs, hi-fi stereo systems, custom upholstery and enhanced interior wood packages.

An AMG-modified W124 E-Class was claimed to be the world's fastest passenger sedan in 1986. Nicknamed the Hammer, it featured an AMG-tuned 5.6-litre DOHC Mercedes-Benz V8 in a midsized sedan. Advanced for its time for a street engine, it had four valves per cylinder and was claimed to push the car faster than a Lamborghini Countach from 100 to 190 km/h (60 to 120 mph). Later models were even more powerful and introduced the 17-inch AMG Aero 1 Hammer wheels.

Through the early 2000s, AMG focused principally on supercharged V8 and V6 engines, but the company officially abandoned this technology in 2006 with the introduction of the naturally aspirated 6.2 L M156 V8. On 16 January 2006, Mercedes-AMG Chairman Volker Mornhinweg told AutoWeek that the company would use turbocharging for higher output rather than supercharging. For 2011, AMG released the M157 5.5L bi-turbo V8, which has supplanted the M156 in its full-sized cars such as the S-Class and CL-Class (and is trickling down to the CLS, E-Class, and ML-class). In 2012, Mercedes-AMG Chairman Olla Kallenius said that Mercedes-AMG will not produce diesel engines to compete with BMW's tri-turbo diesels (BMW M Performance range).

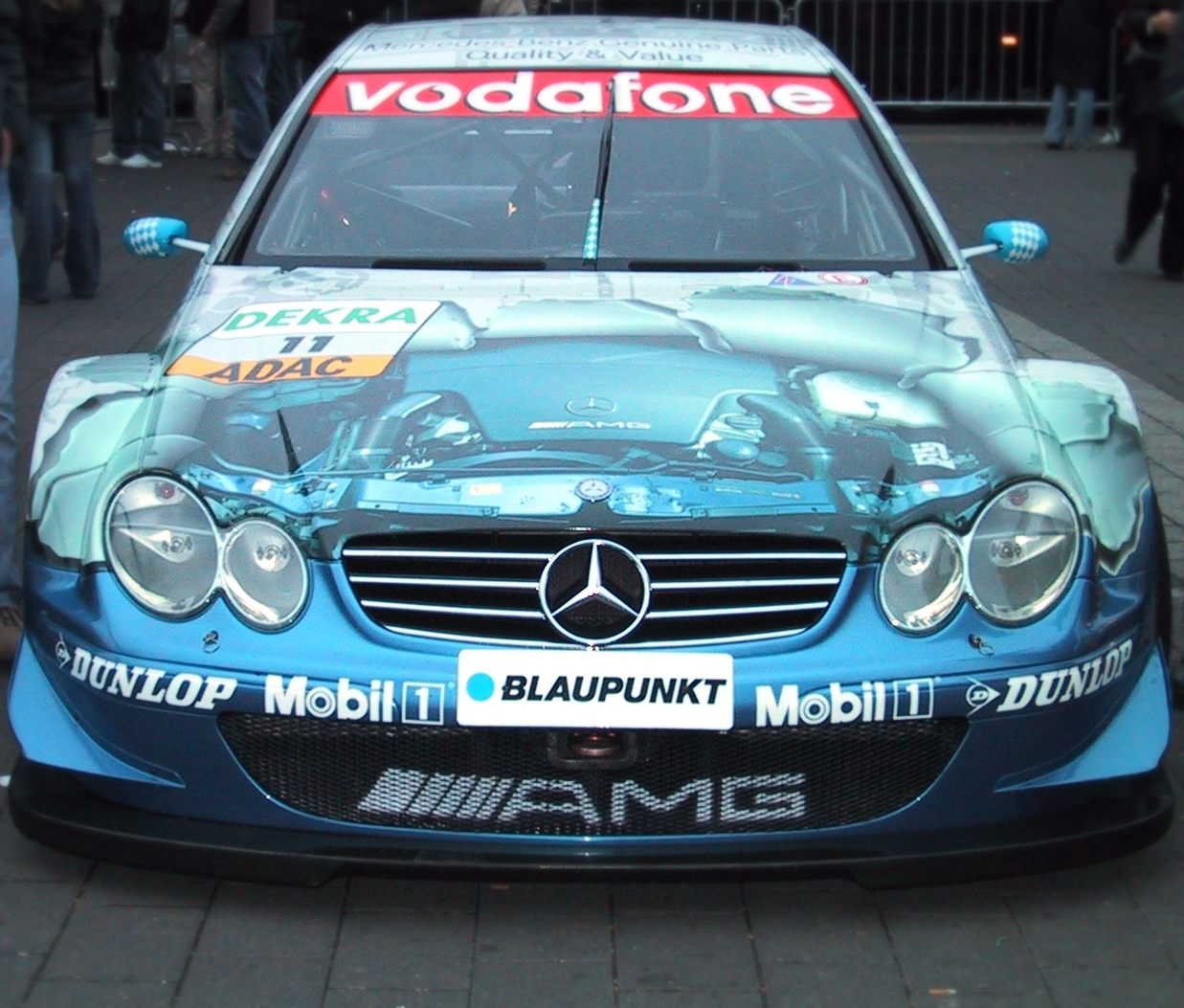
Mercedes AMG DTM car (2003)

Although there were some AMG models in the 1980s with manual transmissions, almost all recent models have used automatics (5G-Tronic, 7G-Tronic and later 9G-Tronic with Speedshift), in contrast to BMW M, which used manual and recently automatic transmissions (the current type being a dual clutch transmission).

Although these are considered the most well known in-house tuning divisions, Mercedes-AMG has a considerably different philosophy than BMW M. Compared to BMW M, Mercedes-AMG is "less narrow in its sporting focus, yet still combining sledgehammer performance with relaxed handling, cultured comfort, and practicality".

While founders Hans Werner Aufrecht and Erhard Melcher had emphasized proper racing cars, Mercedes-AMG had diverged considerably from this philosophy in recent years, with their offerings being well known for straight-line acceleration but poor handling dynamics. However, current Mercedes-AMG chairman Volker Mornhinweg has urged the division to return to its roots of building sports cars.

=== Motor racing ===
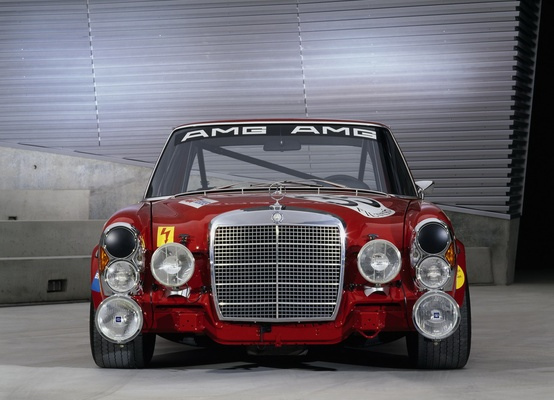
AMG 300 SEL 6.8, "Red Sow" (1971)

In the late 1960s and early 1970s, AMG entered the big Mercedes-Benz 300SEL 6.3 V8 saloon, affectionately named the "Red Sow", in the 1971 Spa 24 Hours, and the European Touring Car Championship. AMG and Mercedes worked together on Mercedes-Benz W201 cars for the 1988 Deutsche Tourenwagen Meisterschaft (DTM, German Touring Car Championship). AMG was made the official partner.

When DaimlerChrysler acquired a majority share of AMG in 1999, the motor racing department was divested into HWA AG. Their first car was the ill-fated Mercedes-Benz CLR. Since 2000, HWA builds and runs the cars for Deutsche Tourenwagen Masters (DTM), as well as the M271 engine tuned for use in Formula 3.

In 2000, an extensively modified one-off Mercedes-Benz AMG CLK 55 was built by the AMG Factory as a purpose-built race car to compete in the 2001 Targa Tasmania 7 day road race. Mick Doohan was the works Mercedes-Benz AMG driver.

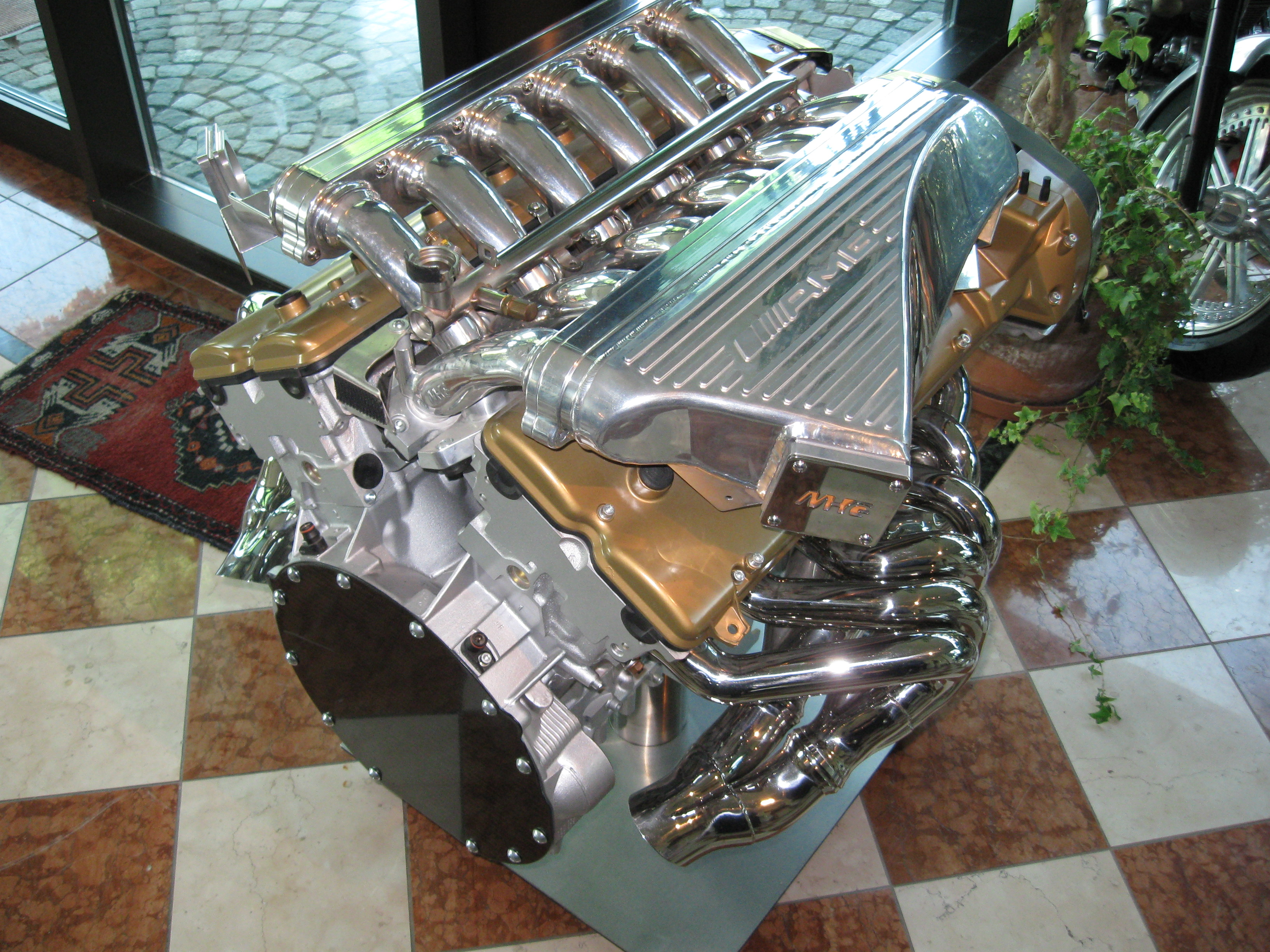
AMG engine display at the Pagani factory

Six successive lightly modified Mercedes-Benz AMG models (including, most recently, a C190 GT Black Series) have acted as the safety cars for the FIA Formula One World Championship.

Since 2010, the SLS AMG GT3 and the AMG GT3 have been competing in GT competitions around the world, such as the FIA GT3 European Championship, Blancpain Endurance Series, Blancpain Sprint Series, VLN, 24 Hours of Nürburgring, British GT Championship, Super GT, Australian GT Championship, Bathurst 12 Hour, Dubai 24 Hour, Macau GT Cup and Pirelli World Challenge.

In late 2011, after the end of the Formula One season, Mercedes GP Petronas announced that it would be using the AMG branding for its F1 efforts, changing its name to Mercedes AMG Petronas from the 2012 season onwards.

Three AMG E-Class V8 Supercars competed in the Australian Supercars Championship from 2013 to 2015, operated by Erebus Motorsport under the AMG Customer Sports Program.

=== Relationship with Pagani ===
AMG also provides engines for Pagani's Zonda, Huayra and Utopia cars. The M297 7,291 cc displacement V12 engines were originally used in the 1998 Mercedes-Benz CLK GTR Straßenversion and made later available for the Zonda. It was the largest displacement naturally aspirated engine provided by AMG.

=== Relationship with Aston Martin ===
On 25 July 2013, Aston Martin Lagonda Ltd and Daimler AG announced moves towards a technical partnership with Mercedes-AMG GmbH. The deal will see Aston Martin access significant Mercedes-AMG GmbH and Mercedes-Benz Cars' resources, allowing the development of bespoke V8 powertrains and the use of certain components of electric/electronic architecture. Daimler AG now owns a stake of 5% of non-voting shares in Aston Martin, joining existing shareholders Investment DAR, Adeem Investment and Investindustrial. The technical partnership will support Aston Martin's launch of a new generation of models and newly developed bespoke V8 powertrains.

Since the 2021 Formula One World Championship, the German marque shares the role as the official Safety Car supplier with Aston Martin.

=== Relationship with Lotus ===
AMG also provides engines for the Lotus Emira. The M139 I4 engine was originally used in the CLA 45 AMG.

== Leadership ==
- Hans Werner Aufrecht and Erhard Melcher (1967–1999)
- Wolfgang Bernhard (1998–2000)
- Ulrich Bruhnke (2001–2003)
- Hubertus Troska (2003–2005)
- Volker Mornhinweg (2005–2010)
- Ola Källenius (2010–2013)
- Tobias Moers (2013–2020)
- Philipp Schiemer (2020–2023)
- Michael Schiebe (2023–present)

== AMG trim ==
Mercedes-Benz allows customers to upgrade nearly any model by adding an AMG trim or styling package. So customers can customize Mercedes cars to look like an AMG car, minus the AMG engine and transmission. AMG trim can include things such as a rear spoiler, body styling, deep front air dam, AMG style wheels, sport front seats, sport steering wheel, AMG floor mats, sport suspension, sport brakes, and more.

== Current AMG models ==
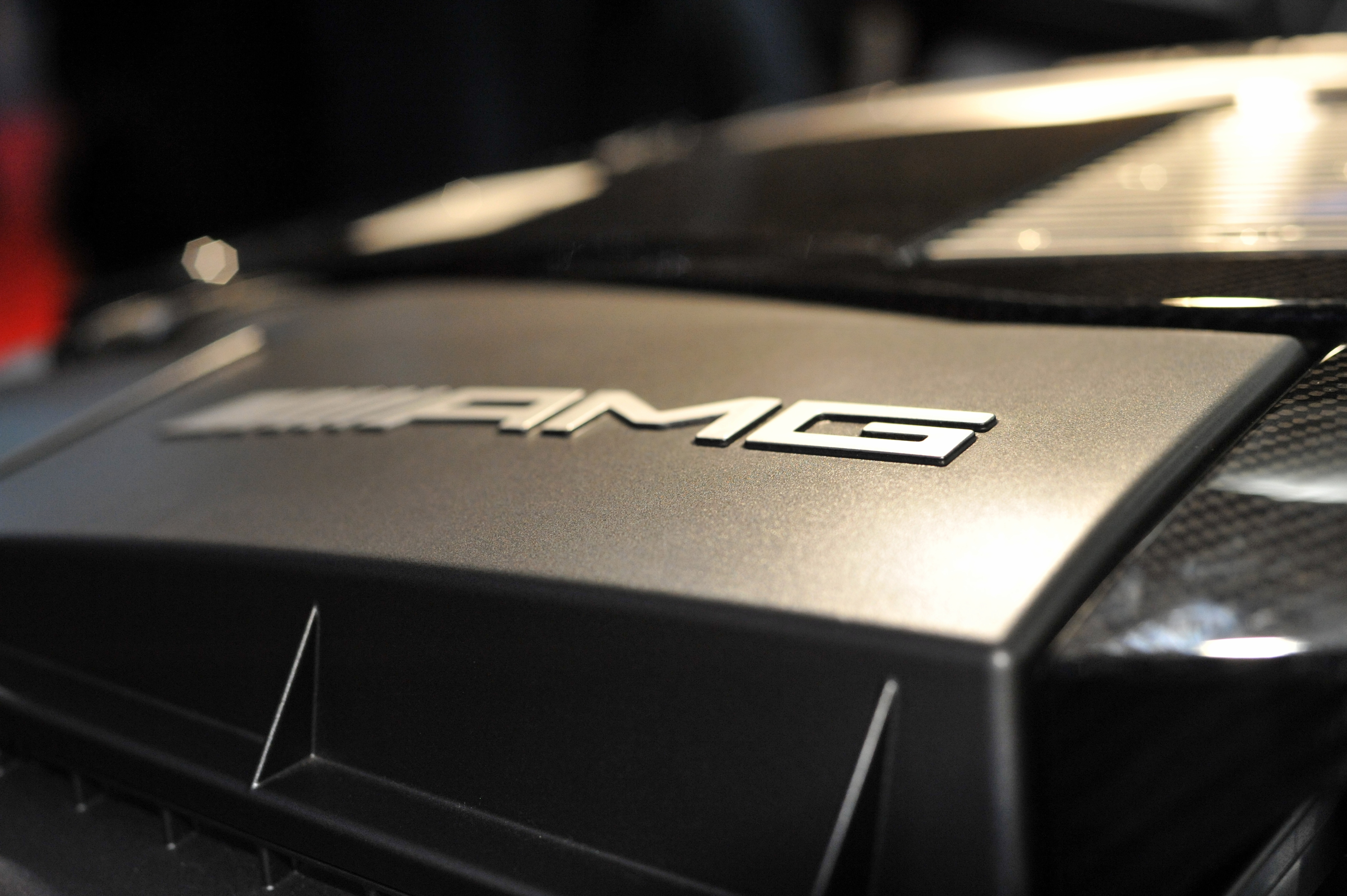
AMG carbon fibre engine cover

All AMG engines – with the exception of the "35", "43" and "53" models, as well as the PU106B 1.6 L V6 E-Turbo Hybrid F1 engine used on the AMG One – are hand built using a "one man, one engine" philosophy at the current AMG plant in Affalterbach, Germany. To signify this, each AMG engine builder stamps the engines they produce with an engraved plaque depicting their signature. According to Mercedes-Benz, there are only about 50 AMG engine builders.

As part of the official Mercedes product line, the AMG models are sold side by side with regular production models, unlike those offered by other Mercedes tuning firms such as Brabus.

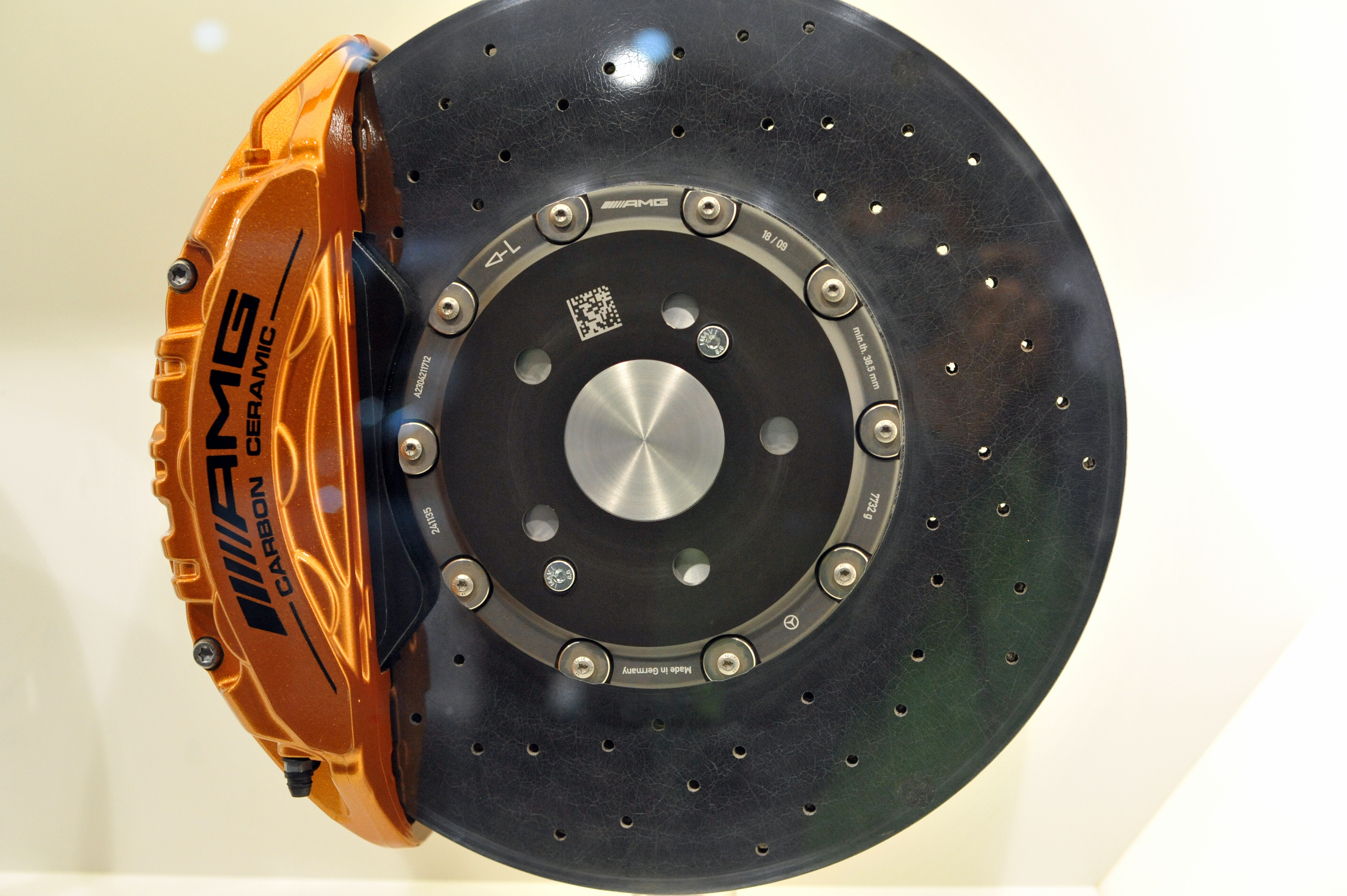
E 63 AMG carbon ceramic brake Geneva auto show 2011

=== "35" M60 2.0 L Inline-4 Turbo ===
- Mercedes-AMG A 35
- Mercedes-AMG GLA 35

=== "43" M139 2.0 L Inline-4 Turbo ===
- Mercedes-AMG C 43
- Mercedes-AMG SL 43
- Mercedes-AMG GLC 43

=== "43" M256 3.0 L Inline-6 Turbo ===
- Mercedes-AMG GT 43 4-Door Coupé

=== "45" M139 2.0 L Inline-4 Turbo ===
- Mercedes-AMG A 45/A 45 S 4MATIC+
- Mercedes-AMG GLA 45/GLA 45 S 4MATIC+

At 310 kW (416 hp) and 500 nm in the 45 S variant, the M139 with twin-scroll turbo was the world's most powerful four-cylinder engine in serial production at the time with a specific output of 208 hp per litre or 104 hp per cylinder.

=== "53" M256 3.0 L Inline-6 Turbo ===
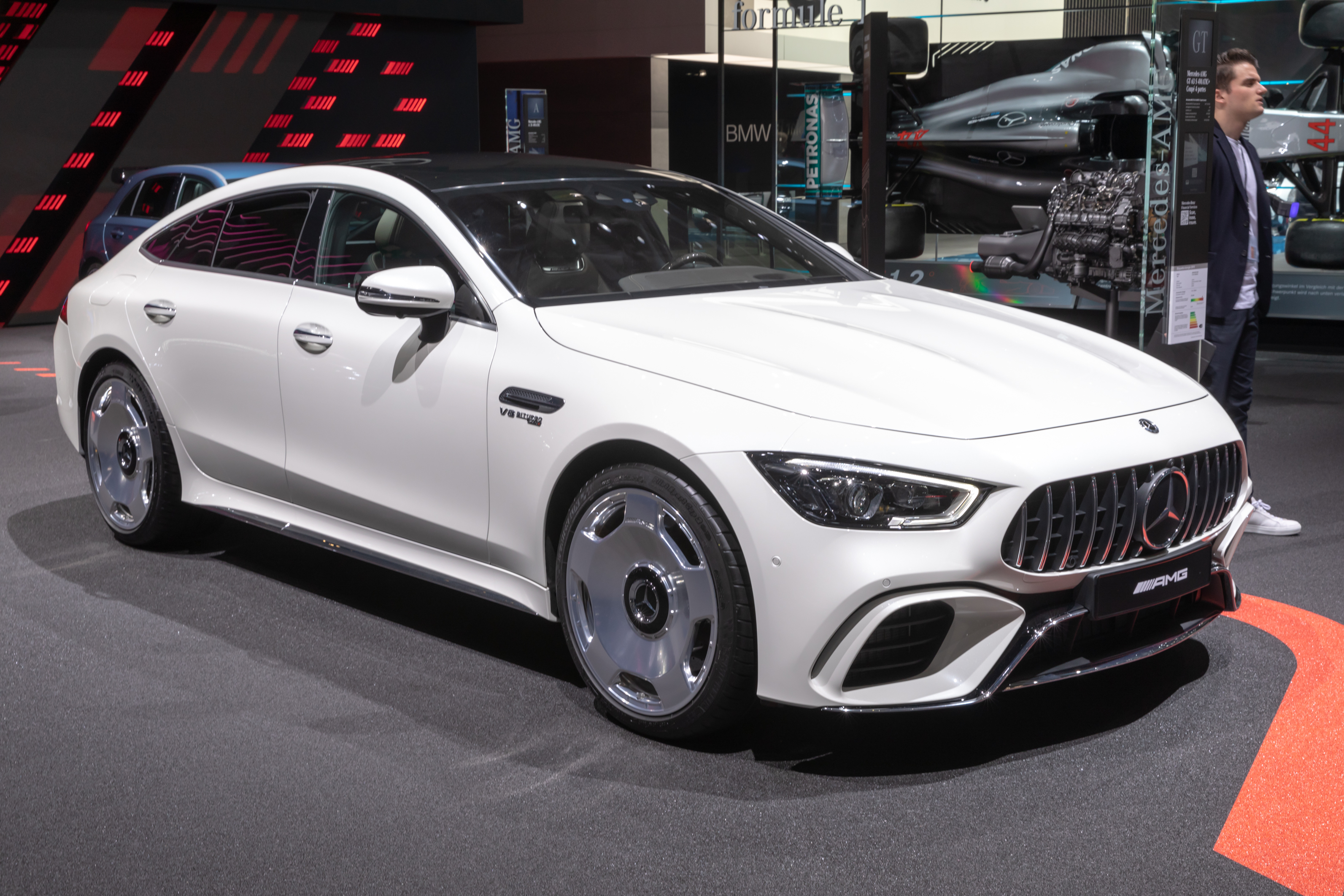
AMG GT 53 4-Door Coupé

- Mercedes-AMG CLE 53
- Mercedes-AMG GLE 53

These are powered by the new Mercedes-Benz M 256 inline six cylinder engine.

=== "53 E-Performance" M256 3.0 L Inline-6 Turbo PHEV ===
- Mercedes-AMG E 53 HYBRID 4MATIC+
- Mercedes-AMG GLE 53 HYBRID 4MATIC+

=== "55" M177 4.0 L V8 Bi-Turbo ===
- Mercedes-AMG SL 55 4MATIC+
- Mercedes-AMG GT 55

=== "63" M177/M178 4.0 L V8 Bi-Turbo ===
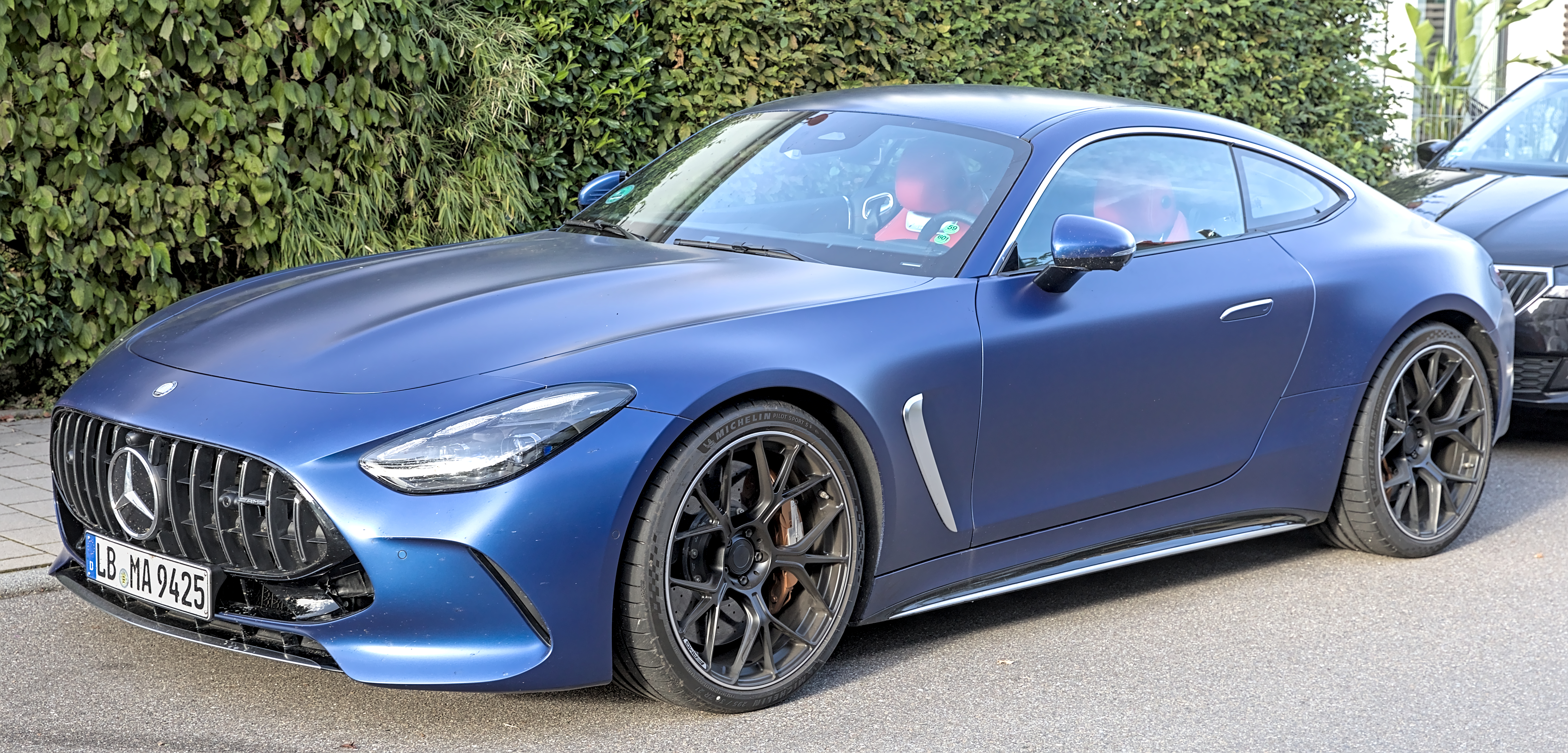
Mercedes-AMG GT

- Mercedes-AMG GT 63/63 Pro
- Mercedes-AMG SL 63 4MATIC+
- Mercedes-AMG G 63 (W465)
- Mercedes-AMG GLE 63 S
- Mercedes-AMG GLS 63

Launched in the UK market in April 2015, the 4-litre M178 V8 uses an unusual configuration where the position of the intake and exhaust are reversed, to create a more compact engine and hence vehicle design. This "hot inside v" configuration, as AMG calls it, has the exhaust gasses exiting into the central v area of the engine block where the engine's twin turbochargers are also mounted.

=== "63 E-Performance" M139 2.0 L Inline-4 Turbo PHEV ===
- Mercedes-AMG C 63 S E-PERFORMANCE
- Mercedes-AMG GLC 63 S E-PERFORMANCE

The M139 found in the C 63 S E-Performance produces 350 kW (469 hp), giving it a specific output of 235 hp (175 kW) per litre or 117 hp (87.5 kW) per cylinder, making it the current most powerful four-cylinder engine in serial production.

=== "63 E-Performance" M177 4.0 L V8 Bi-Turbo PHEV ===
- Mercedes-AMG S 63 E-PERFORMANCE
- Mercedes-AMG GT 63 S E-PERFORMANCE
- Mercedes-AMG SL 63 S E-PERFORMANCE

=== Mercedes-AMG EQ ===
==== "43" Dual-Motor ====
- Mercedes-AMG EQE 43
- Mercedes-AMG EQE SUV 43

==== "53" Dual-Motor ====
- Mercedes-AMG EQE 53
- Mercedes-AMG EQE SUV 53
- Mercedes-AMG EQS 53

== Previous AMG models ==
=== "65" M275 6.0 L V12 Bi-Turbo ===
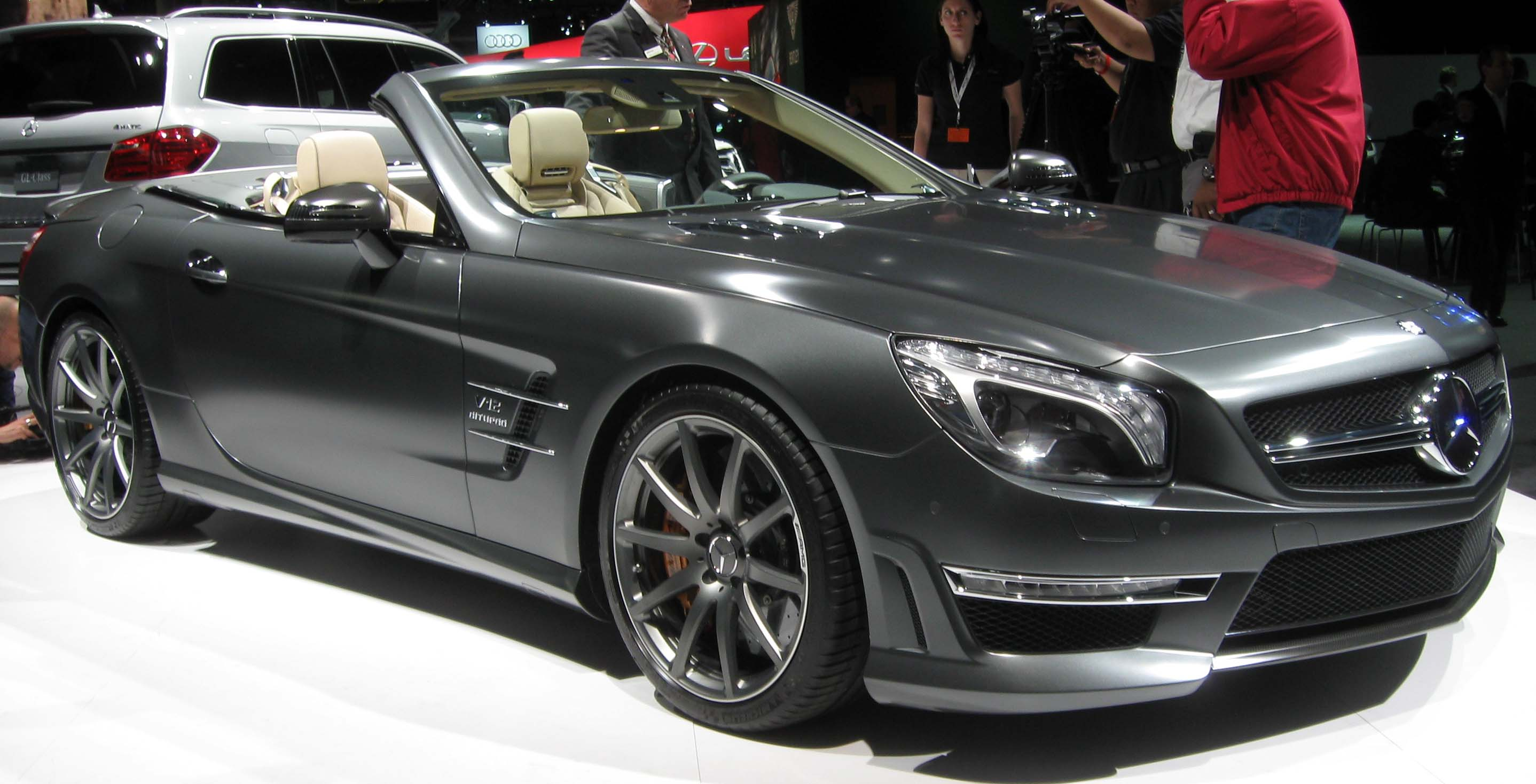
Mercedes-Benz SL 65 AMG (2012)

The models listed below were powered by a variant of the Mercedes-Benz M275 engine.

- 2004–2013 S65 AMG
- 2004–2014 CL65 AMG
- 2004–2011 SL65 AMG
- 2012–2018 G65 AMG
- 2012–2018 Mercedes-AMG SL 65
- 2014–2019 Mercedes-AMG S 65

This AMG powerplant had an all-new design of the bi-turbo system, which features larger turbochargers, a new, more powerful charge-air cooling system, an increase in the engine displacement (to 5980 cc), and many other engine design measures. This allows it to produce a claimed 621 horsepower and 738 lb⋅ft (1,001 N⋅m) of torque.

"65" models used a 5-speed automatic transmission for a long time, as the newer 7G-Tronic wasn't able to handle the torque from the V12 engines. This was changed with the introduction of 2012 SL 65 AMG, which uses the same AMG SpeedShift MCT transmission as the rest of the AMG line-up.

Coinciding with the facelift of the CL-Class for the 2011 model year, the 2011 CL 65 AMG had an enhanced engine. AMG redesigned the exhaust gas turbochargers and added new engine electronics. It produced 621 horsepower, allowing the car to accelerate from 0–60 mph (0–97 km/h) in 4.2 seconds (0.2 seconds faster than the 2011 CL 63), with an electronically limited top speed of 186 mph (299 km/h). The update also improved fuel economy and reduced carbon emissions by 3.5% over the outgoing model.

=== "63" M157 5.5 L V8 Bi-Turbo ===
The models listed below were powered by the M157 variant of the Mercedes-Benz M278 engine.

- Mercedes-AMG CL 63 (C216)
- Mercedes-AMG CLS 63 (C218)
- Mercedes-AMG E 63 (W212)
- Mercedes-AMG G 63 (W463)
- Mercedes-AMG GL 63 (X166 pre-facelift)
- Mercedes-AMG GLE 63 (W166 facelift)
- Mercedes-AMG GLS 63 (X166 facelift)
- Mercedes-AMG M 63 (W166 pre-facelift)
- Mercedes-AMG S 63 (W222 pre-facelift)
- Mercedes-AMG SL 63 (R231)

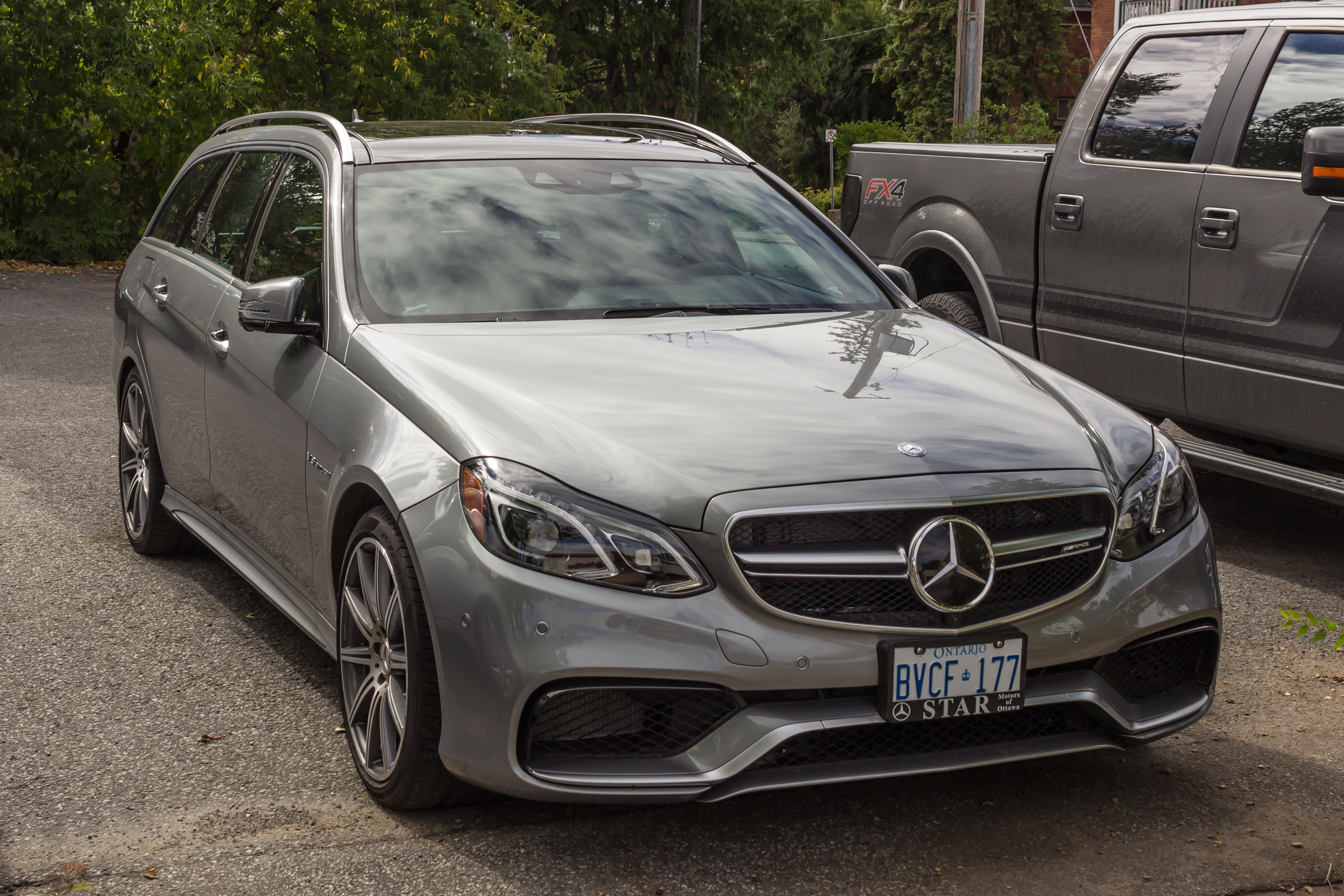
E 63 AMG 4MATIC T

Rumoured in 2009 and confirmed in 2010, AMG developed the M157, a 5.5-litre V8 with direct fuel injection and twin turbochargers. Power is rated at up to 577 bhp (430 kW; 585 PS) at 5,250-5,750rpm with a peak torque of 664 lb⋅ft (900 N⋅m) made between 2,000rpm and 4,500 rpm (the amount of power and torque depends on model, but these are the maximum ratings). Both engines are mated to Mercedes-Benz's 7-speed MCT transmission. Unlike the M156 naturally aspirated 6.2 L V8, which was developed entirely within AMG, the M157 is based upon the M278 used in the regular Mercedes-Benz S-Class and CL-Class. The M157 boasts 25% better fuel economy (10.5 litres per 100 kilometres versus 14.4 L/100 km in the European driving cycle) over the M156, meaning it avoids the US Gas Guzzler Tax for the first time ever, despite having up to 47 horsepower more. The M157's increased torque from both the regular version and performance package means the engine can be shifted into a taller gear sooner, keeping engine revs and fuel consumption to a minimum. The new M157 has an engine start/stop mode and is lightweight at 204 kg. The M157 is said to be ideal for powering full-size sedans such as the S-Class, but the older M156 remains in production, as its more precise throttle response is still well suited to smaller sportier models (the C-Class), until the 2015 model arrives, which is powered by a 4.0 liter V8.

5.5 L V8 BiTurbo models carry the "63" model designation, shared with the 6.2L V8 models. Visually, the 2011 S 63 AMG is differentiated from the 2010 model (itself face-lifted over the 2009 S 63) by the more angular design of the chromed dual exhaust tips, which also sport embossed AMG logos, as well as new forged wheels. For the CL 63 AMG, the new M157 engine coincides with the facelift of the CL-Class for the 2011 model year.

Since 2013, AMG models with the S-Model package have featured all-wheel drive, which allows for better handling and better acceleration. The Mercedes-Benz CLS 63 AMG S has been tested to accelerate from 0-60 mph (97 km/h) in 3.2 seconds, with a quarter mile time of 11.6 seconds. This made it the quickest production sedan at the time. Motor Trend tested the 2014 E 63 AMG S with the M157 engine to produce an estimated 676 bhp (504 kW; 685 PS) and 631 lb⋅ft (856 N⋅m).

=== "63" M156/M159 6.2 L V8 ===
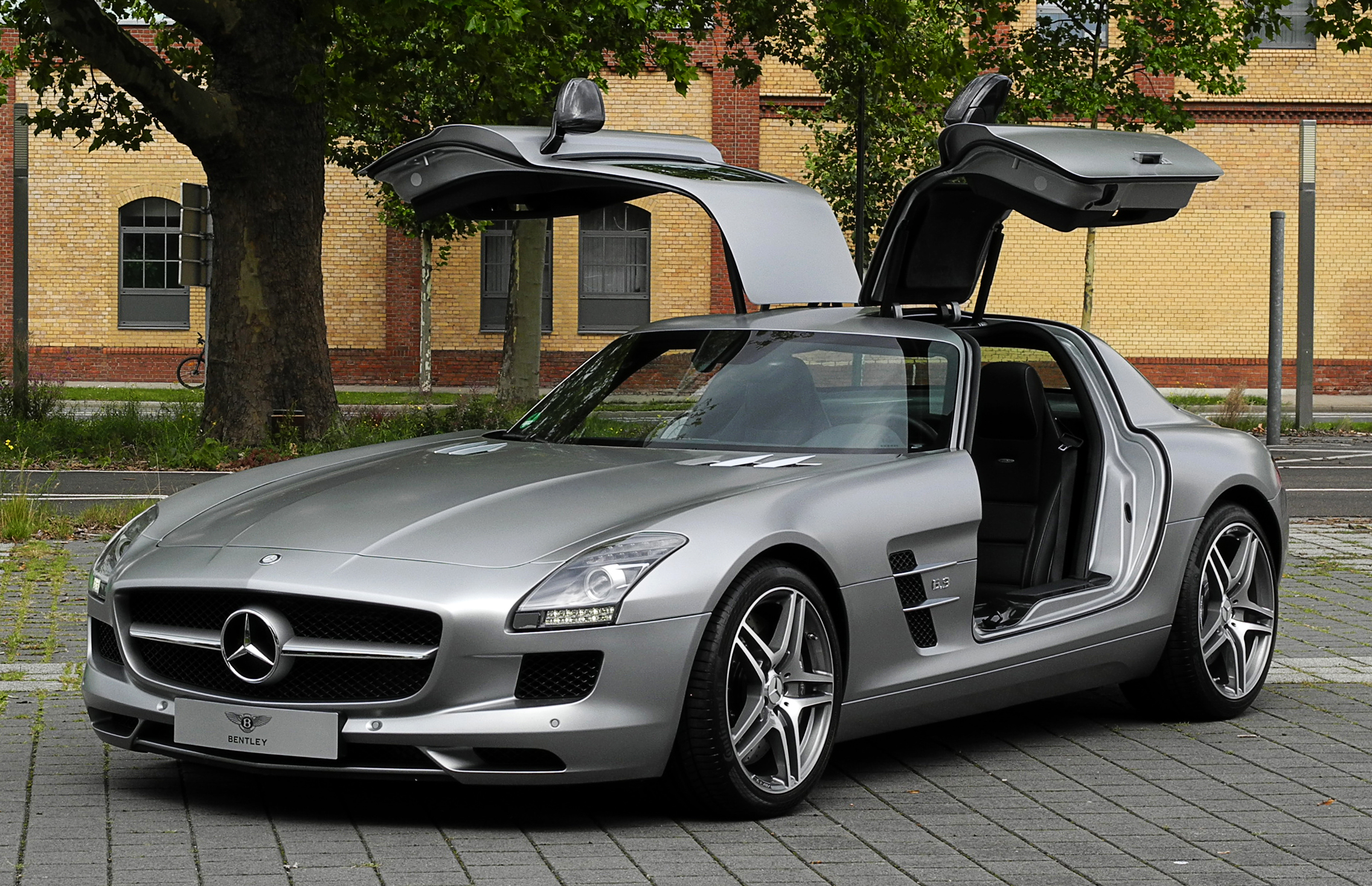
SLS AMG

- 2008-2015 C63 AMG, C63 AMG Black Series, Edition 507 (Sedan and Wagon) (facelifted for the 2012 model year)
- Mercedes E63 AMG (W211, 2009-2011, Sedan and Wagon)
- Mercedes-Benz CLK63 AMG, CLK63 AMG Black Series (introduced at the 2006 Geneva Motor Show) (used as Safety Car for the 2006 and 2007 F1 World Championship)
- Mercedes-Benz S63 AMG (2008-2011)
- Mercedes-Benz CL63 AMG
- Mercedes-Benz ML63 AMG
- Mercedes-Benz E63 AMG (W212, 2010–2012, Sedan and Wagon)
- Mercedes-Benz SLS AMG (M159)
- Mercedes-Benz R63 AMG (2007)
- Mercedes-Benz CLS 63 AMG (introduced at the 2006 Geneva Motor Show, 2007–2011)
- Mercedes-Benz SL63 AMG (2009–2012)

AMG developed its own V8 engine (dubbed M156 in development) for the DTM series. The M156, in various states of tune, was used in models such as the SL 63, E 63, CLS 63, and S 63 until it was replaced by the M157 5.5 L Biturbo V8. This naturally aspirated V8 replaced most of the "55" models. The published output according to Mercedes varies from 457 PS (336 kW; 451 hp) on the C 63 AMG, to 525 PS (386 kW; 518 hp) on the C/CLK/R/ML/GL/S/SL/CL/E 63 AMG.

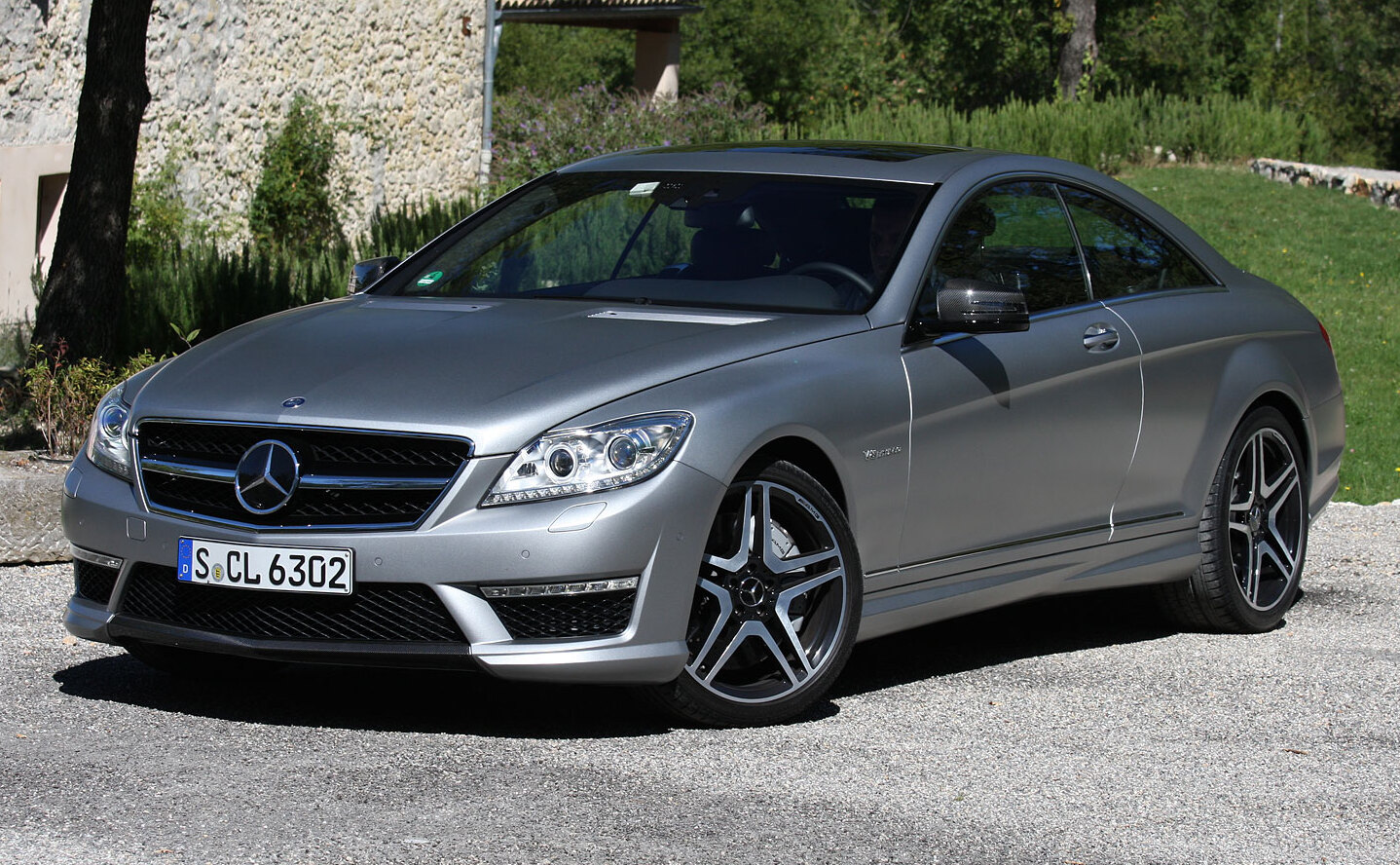
CL 63 AMG

The 2008 S 63/CL 63/SL 63s that used the M156 engine at 518 horsepower edged out that of the S600/CL600/SL600, the latter powered by the 510 horsepower 5.5-liter twin-turbo V12, while also having a higher redline. However, the S600/CL600/SL600 is more expensive and has more torque at 612 pound-feet (830 N⋅m). The S 63/CL 63/SL 63, however, do have quicker acceleration times than their S600/CL600/SL600 counterparts and are the fastest in the lineup in 2014, due to the added weight and torque of the 65s, thus decreasing the 0-60 times and the handling limits.

Compared to the "55" supercharged 5.4 L V8 engine—which was restricted to the Speedshift 5G-Tronic five-speed automatic transmission, as it had a torque capacity of 796 lb⋅ft (1,079 N⋅m)—the reduced torque of the "63" M156 6.2L V8 means it can be mated with the more efficient 7G-Tronic, which can withstand a limit of 542 lb⋅ft (735 N⋅m). Despite the reduction in torque, the increased horsepower and more efficient transmission enable the 63 models to match or surpass the acceleration of the "55" models. Most of the M156-engined models used the 7G-Tronic automatic transmission, however the more recent 2009 SL 63, 2010 E 63, and 2012 C 63 use the 7-speed MCT transmission.

In 2009, AMG developed the M159 engine, which is based on the M156 engine, to use in SLS AMG. The M159 produces 583 horsepower and 489 lb-ft of torque in the Mercedes-Benz SLS AMG GT, and 622 horsepower and 468 lb-ft in the SLS AMG Black Series.

=== "55" M152 5.5 L V8 ===
- AMG SLK 55

The M152 is a naturally aspirated, detuned version of the M157 Biturbo V8. This V8 will be used for the 2012 SLK 55 AMG, and it produces 415 hp and 398 lb-ft. This engine was discontinued in 2016 with the release of the SLC 43 AMG.

=== "43" M276 3.0 L V6 Bi-Turbo ===
- Mercedes-AMG E 43
- Mercedes-AMG GLE 43
- Mercedes-AMG C 43 4MATIC+
- Mercedes-AMG GLC 43 4MATIC+
- Mercedes-AMG C 43
- Mercedes-AMG SLC 43

=== "45" M133 2.0 L Inline-4 Turbo ===
- Mercedes-AMG GLA 45
- Mercedes-AMG A 45
- Mercedes-AMG CLA 45

The 2.0 L Turbo I4 was created for use in the smaller, 45 AMG models, such as the A-Class, CLA-Class, and GLA-Class, which all share the same platform. The M133 (2015 onwards) produces 381 PS (376 hp) and 350 lb⋅ft (475 N⋅m), which made it the most powerful turbo 4-cylinder in production at the time, and with a 190.5-horsepower per liter, one of the most power dense engines in production. Models with the M133 Turbo 4 are paired with a 7-speed AMG SPEEDSHIFT Dual-Clutch Transmission. The CLA45 AMG can accelerate from 0–60 mph (0–97 km/h) in 4.2 seconds, according to Motor Trend's first test of the vehicle.

=== "30" 3.0 L I5 diesel ===
- OM612 3.0 L "30" I5 Diesel models
  - C 30 CDI AMG (sedan, wagon, and Sportcoupé)

=== "32" 3.2 L V6 Kompressor ===
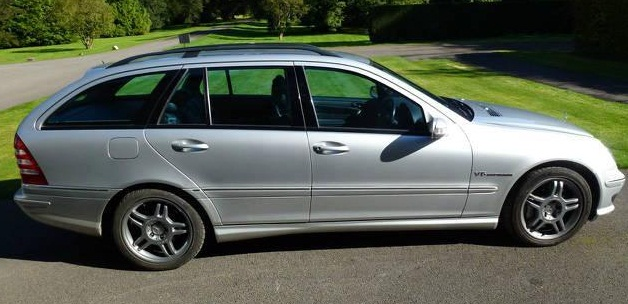
2003 UK version of C 32 Estate (S203) in Brilliant Silver

Powertrain consists of AMG Speedshift 5-speed automatic transmission mated to an AMG 3.2-litre V6 Kompressor engine with an output of 260 kW (349 hp) and 332 lb⋅ft (450 N⋅m) at 4,400 rpm. The engine is a special version of the 3.2 L (3199 cc) M112 E32, fitted with a helical twin-screw supercharger and water-to-air intercooler. The supercharger was developed in conjunction with IHI and features Teflon-coated rotors, producing overall boost of 14.5 psi (1 bar). Compared to the standard M112 engine, the AMG version also has a new crankshaft, new connecting rods and pistons, an oil pump with a 70-percent increased capacity, lightweight camshafts, and harder valve springs for a redline of 6200 rpm, an increase of 200 rpm.

While rival BMW M developed the SMG-II automated manual for the BMW M3, the C 32 and SLK 32 have a 5-speed automatic transmission with a "Speedshift" system, which now has quicker response (up to 35 percent) to accelerator and shift selector movements.

The C 32 has a smaller engine than its predecessors, the C 36 AMG with the M104 3.6L I6 engine, and the C 43 AMG powered by the M113 4.3L V8 engine. The C 32 AMG can accelerate from 0–60 mph (97 km/h) in 5.2 seconds, 0–100 mph (161 km/h) in 12.6 seconds, and has a 1/4 mile time of 13.6 seconds at 106 mph (171 km/h) (C&D comparison test May 2003).

- 3.2 L supercharged M112 V6 AMG
  - 2002–2004 C 32 AMG (sedan, wagon (S203), and Sportcoupé)
  - 2001–2004 SLK 32 AMG
  - 2005–2006 Chrysler Crossfire SRT-6

=== "55" M113K 5.4L V8 Kompressor ===
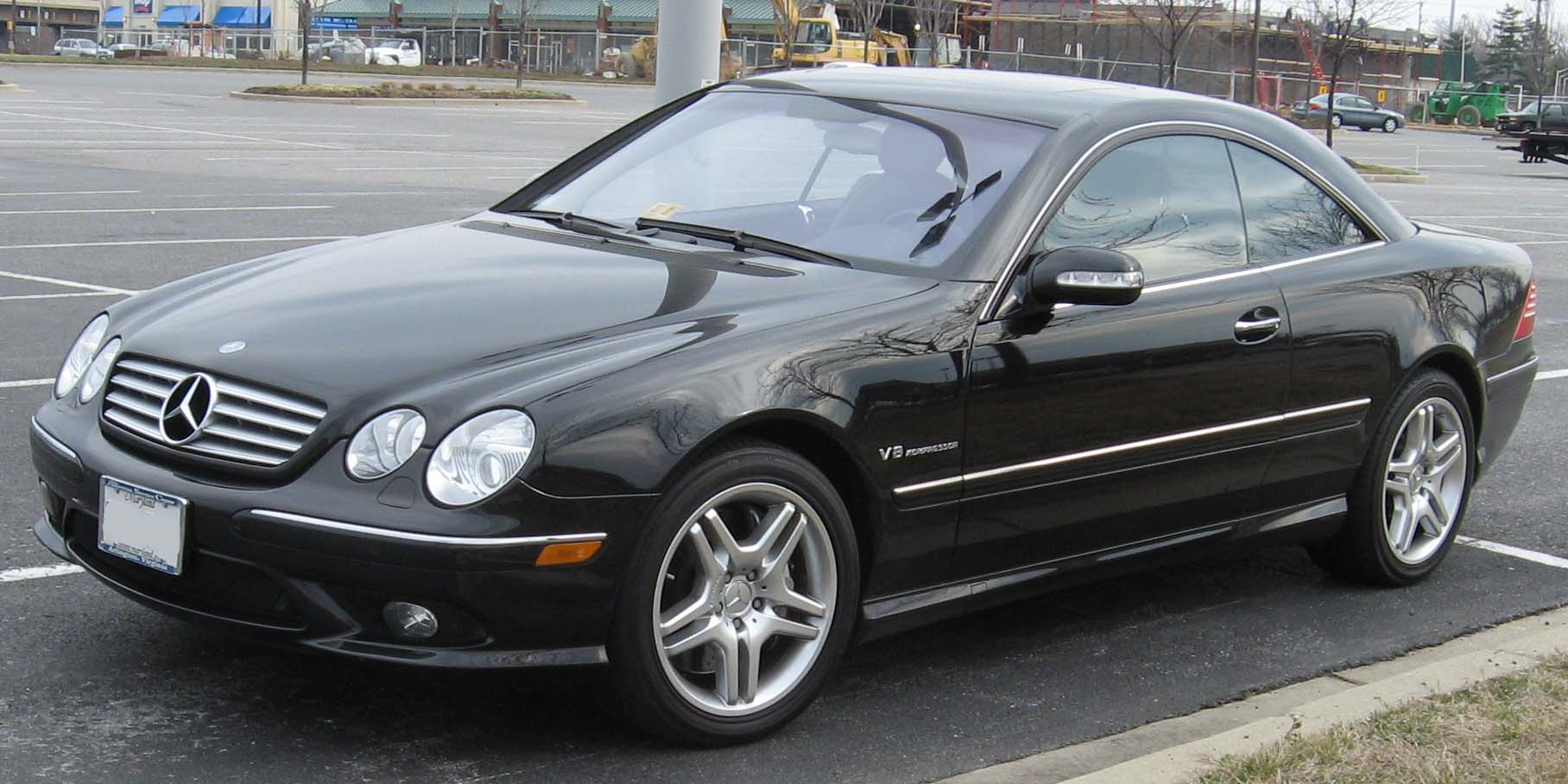
2003 AMG CL 55 AMG

This model was nicknamed the "Hammer" after the original 1986 AMG Hammer (a W124 E-Class sedan with an AMG-tuned 360 hp 5.6-litre V8).

The main engine is a 5.4 L V8 engine This engine comes in two configurations.

- The first configuration is a naturally aspirated V8 with 354 PS (260 kW; 349 hp) that is used in the C 55 AMG, CLK 55 AMG, E 55 AMG (1999-2002), SLK 55 AMG, and ML 55 AMG. The C 43 AMG (model years 1998–2000) was powered by a naturally aspirated V8 engine from the M113 family, but at a reduced displacement of 4.3L, hence the '43' designation.
- The other configuration is a similar unit but with a highly efficient Lysholm type twin screw supercharger, as manufactured by Eaton. This supercharger is found in the rest of the AMG 55 models, which are typically midsized or larger vehicles. According to Mercedes, the published output varies from 476 PS (350 kW; 469 hp) to 517 PS (380 kW; 510 hp) and 700 N⋅m (520 lb⋅ft) to 720 N⋅m (530 lb⋅ft), depending on various methods of power measurements and different ECU programming, in accordance with nation-specific requirements. For instance, the E 55 AMG's engine was at the low end, yet nonetheless it was still Mercedes-Benz's fastest sedan at the time, while the SL55 AMG's engine had the top output. Mercedes has claimed that a more restrictive exhaust system was responsible for cutting output on the E 55 AMG, however some enthusiasts have managed to bump up horsepower to 505 on the E 55 by incorporating some parts from the SL 55.

The supercharged 5.4 L 24 valve V8 engine was mated to the Speedshift 5-speed automatic transmission, which has a torque capacity of 796 lb⋅ft (1,079 N⋅m), as the newer 7G-Tronic introduced in 2003 is limited to 542 lb⋅ft (735 N⋅m), which is not enough to handle the torque from the supercharged V8.

The V8 S 55 AMG had an output comparable to the V12-powered S600 throughout its production. The S 55 AMG (2001–02) was outfitted with a 5.4 L 354 hp (264 kW) V8 engine while the later versions (2003–06) sported the same motor, but supercharged to a rated 493 hp (368 kW). The S600 (2001–02) was outfitted with a 5.8L 362 hp (270 kW) V12 engine while the later versions (2003–06) sported a twin-turbocharged (or Bi-Turbo) 493 hp (368 kW) 5.5L V12. The justification for having two models with the same power is that the S 55 AMG is sportier and more responsive, while the costlier S600 is more luxurious with a smoother ride.

AMG phased out both the naturally aspirated and supercharged 5.4 L engines in favor of the new M156 V8 beginning in 2006, which was paired with 7G-Tronic. However, some enthusiasts were disappointed because the naturally aspirated M156 produces less torque than the supercharged M113K.

For the 2009 model year:

- M113 5.4 L "55" V8 models (naturally aspirated)
  - SLK 55 AMG
- M113 5.4 L "55" V8 models (supercharged)
  - G 55 AMG

==== Previous 55 AMG models ====
- 1999–2002 E 55 AMG
- 2003–2006 E 55 AMG
- 2000–2003 ML 55 AMG
- 2003–2005 C 55 AMG
- 2001–2002 CLK 55 AMG
- 2003–2006 CLK 55 AMG
- 2004–2007 CLS 55 AMG
- 2001–2008 SL 55 AMG
- 2001–2006 S 55 AMG
- 2001–2006 CL 55 AMG
- 2005–2006 C 55 AMG
- 2001–2009 G 55 AMG

=== "63" M137 6.3 L V12 ===
The "63" badging was used on the short-lived 2001 S 63 AMG, 2001 CL 63 AMG and 2002 G 63 AMG. These were produced in limited quantities for one month and only offered through AMG to select customers in Europe and Asia, purportedly state leaders. The CL 63 AMG was the rarest C215 CL of all, and just 26 examples were built in November 2001 (51 plate), with some UK being and one for France registered in March 2002. These had a base price of £110,000 (~US$200,000). The G 63 AMG was the rarest W463 of all with just 5 examples built in September 2002 and sold in Germany at over €250,000 each.

These are powered by a naturally aspirated 6.3L V12 producing 326 kW (443 PS; 437 hp). This engine is based on the M137 5.8L V12 used in the S 600 and CL 600, but the AMG variants have a larger displacement, a new management system, a new crank case and cooling system, weight-optimized pistons, and a new camshaft with greater valve lift and modified valves. 390 lb⋅ft (530 N⋅m) of torque are available between 2500 and 5800 rpm with a peak of 620 N⋅m (457 lb⋅ft) at 4400 rpm while horsepower grows by almost 80 over the 5.8L V12. It is mated to a 5-speed automatic transmission. The 2001 S 63 AMG V12 had 100 hp more than the 2001 S 55 AMG, and was a few tenths faster.

=== "60", "73", "70", "55" ===
The Mercedes-Benz SL-Class (R129) had several AMG variants during its production run from 1989 to 2001.

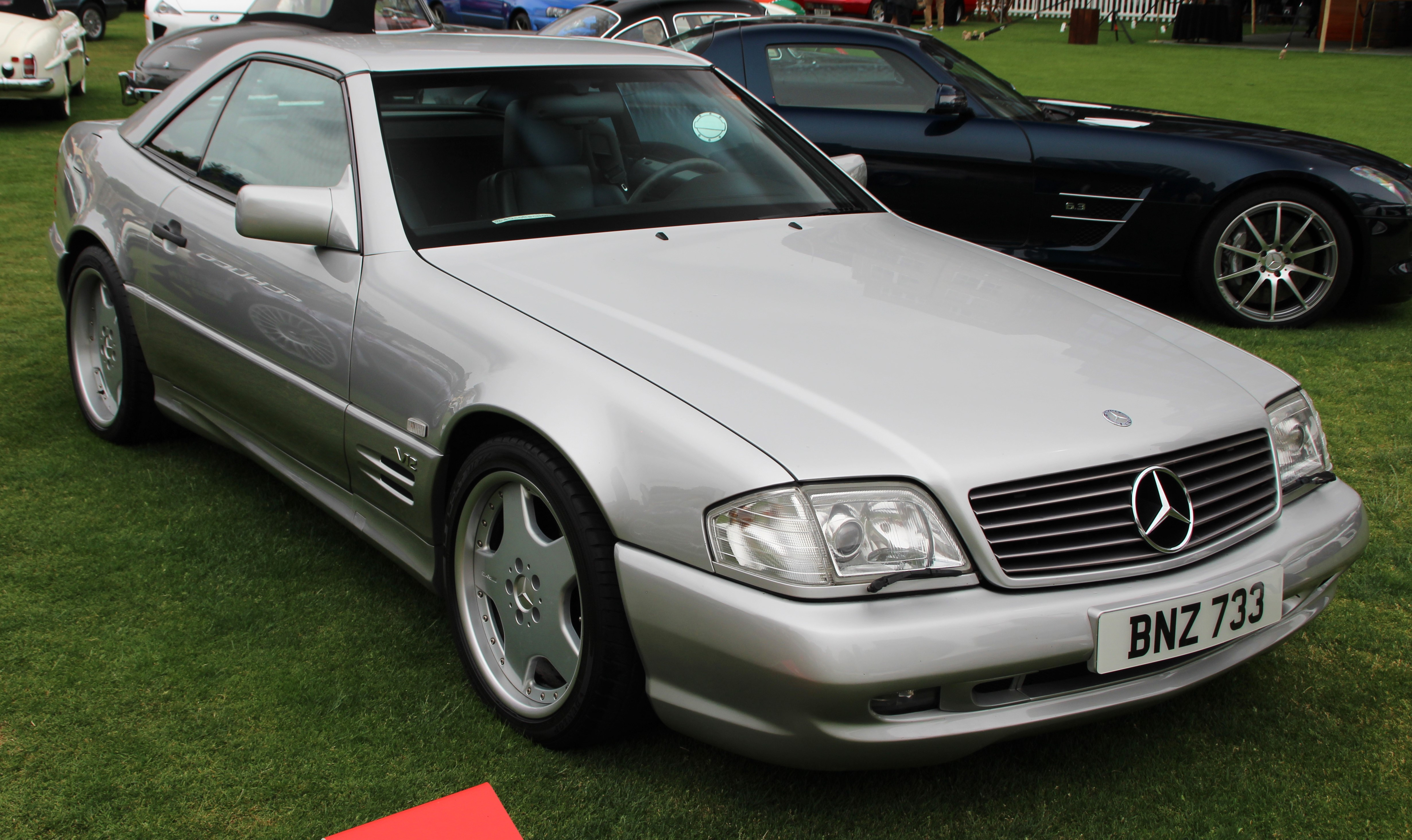
1996 SL70 AMG

The SL 60 AMG was the most numerous of these rare cars. Sold from 1993 to 1998, it used a 6.0 litre V8 engine producing 381 PS (280 kW; 376 hp) at 5500 rpm. AMG claimed a 0–62 mph (100 km/h) speed of 5.6 seconds. Its top speed was limited to 250 km/h (155 mph), but with the limiter removed, it was capable of approximately 185 mph (298 km/h). AMG later unofficially conceded that 0–60 mph (0–97 km/h) was more like 5.0 seconds and the engine produced between 405 and 410 bhp.

Extremely rare was the SL 73 AMG, sold through Mercedes-AMG in 1995, and offering the most powerful V12 engine ever put into an SL up to that time. After a brief hiatus, the SL 73 was offered again from 1998 to 2001. The same 7.3 L V12 was later used by Pagani in the Zonda.

Even rarer is the SL 70 AMG, with a 7.0 L (7055 cc) V12 engine.

The SL 55 AMG was sold in the R129 body style from 1998 to 2001 in limited numbers (5.4L V8, 354 PS (260 kW; 349 hp) at 5500 rpm). It was the predecessor of the production R230 SL 55 AMG sold later, albeit was normally aspirated in the R129 and not supercharged as in its R230 successor.

=== Electric Drive ===
In 2013, Mercedes-AMG announced the SLS AMG Coupe Electric Drive, which was to be the first zero emissions vehicle from AMG. The vehicle used technology derived from Formula 1, and was the fastest electric car. The SLS AMG Electric Drive has 740 horsepower and 738 lb-ft of torque, and Mercedes-AMG claims a 0–60 mph (0–97 km/h) time of 3.9 seconds.

== Black Series models ==
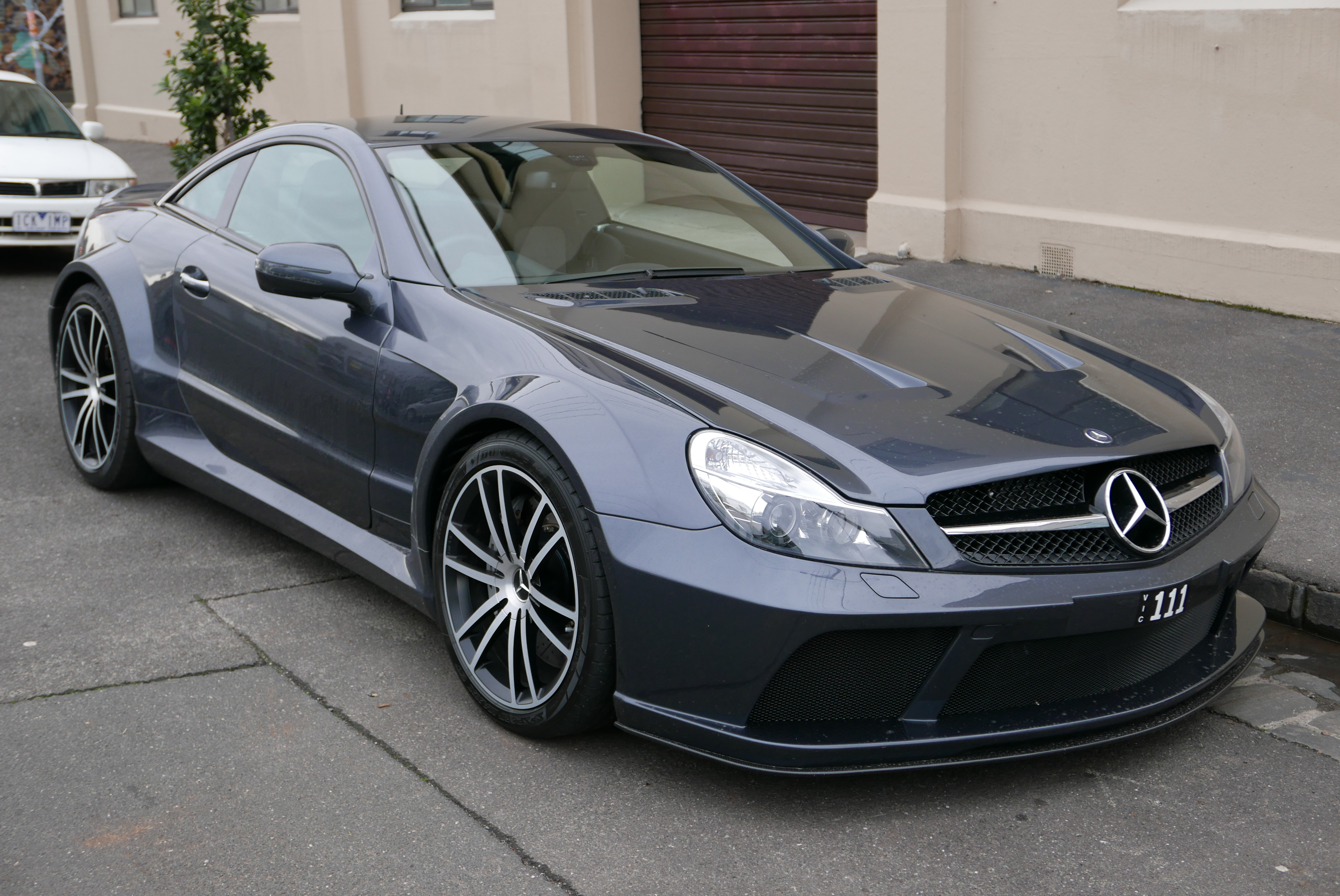
SL 65 AMG Black Series

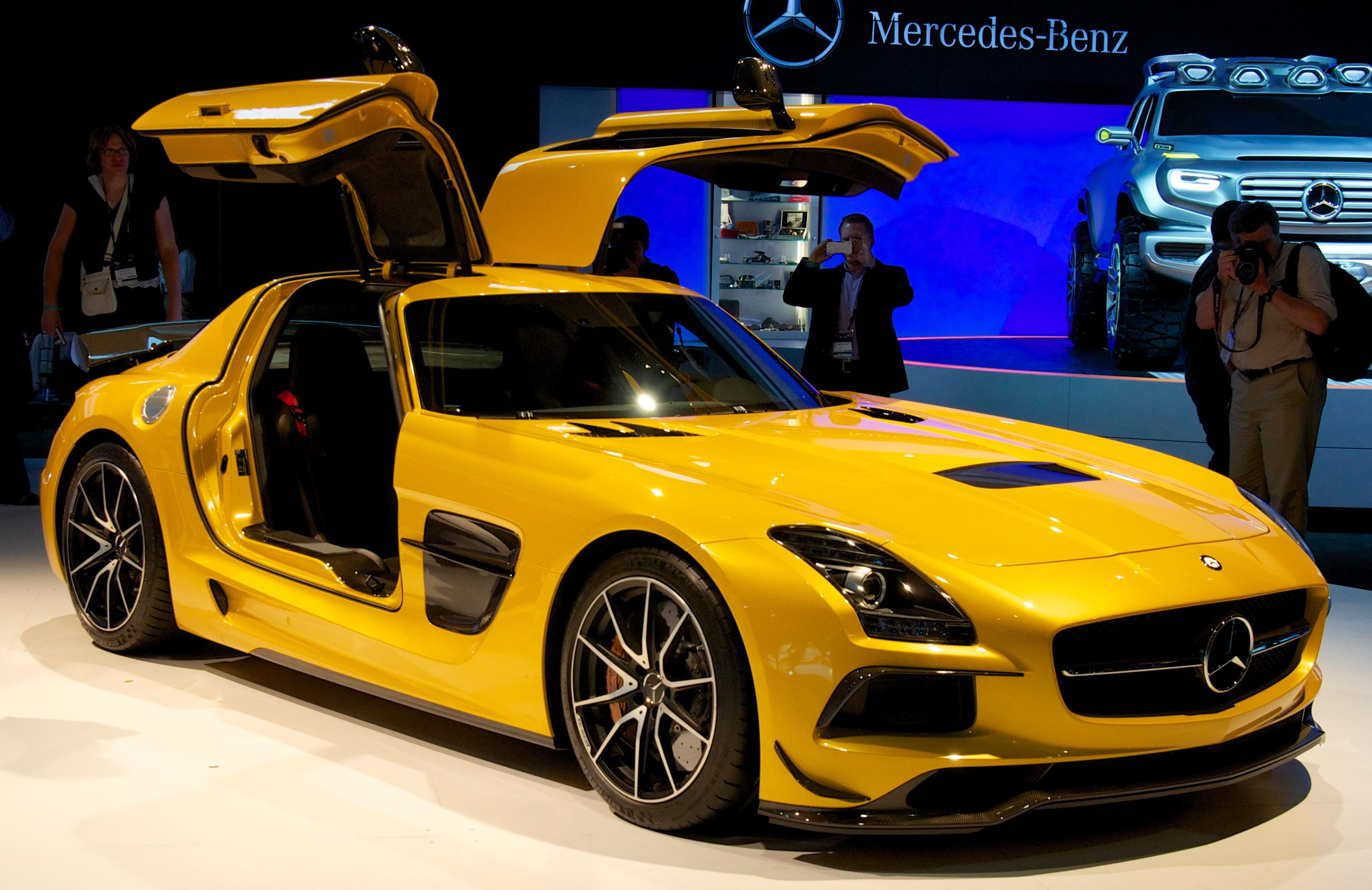
SLS AMG Black Series

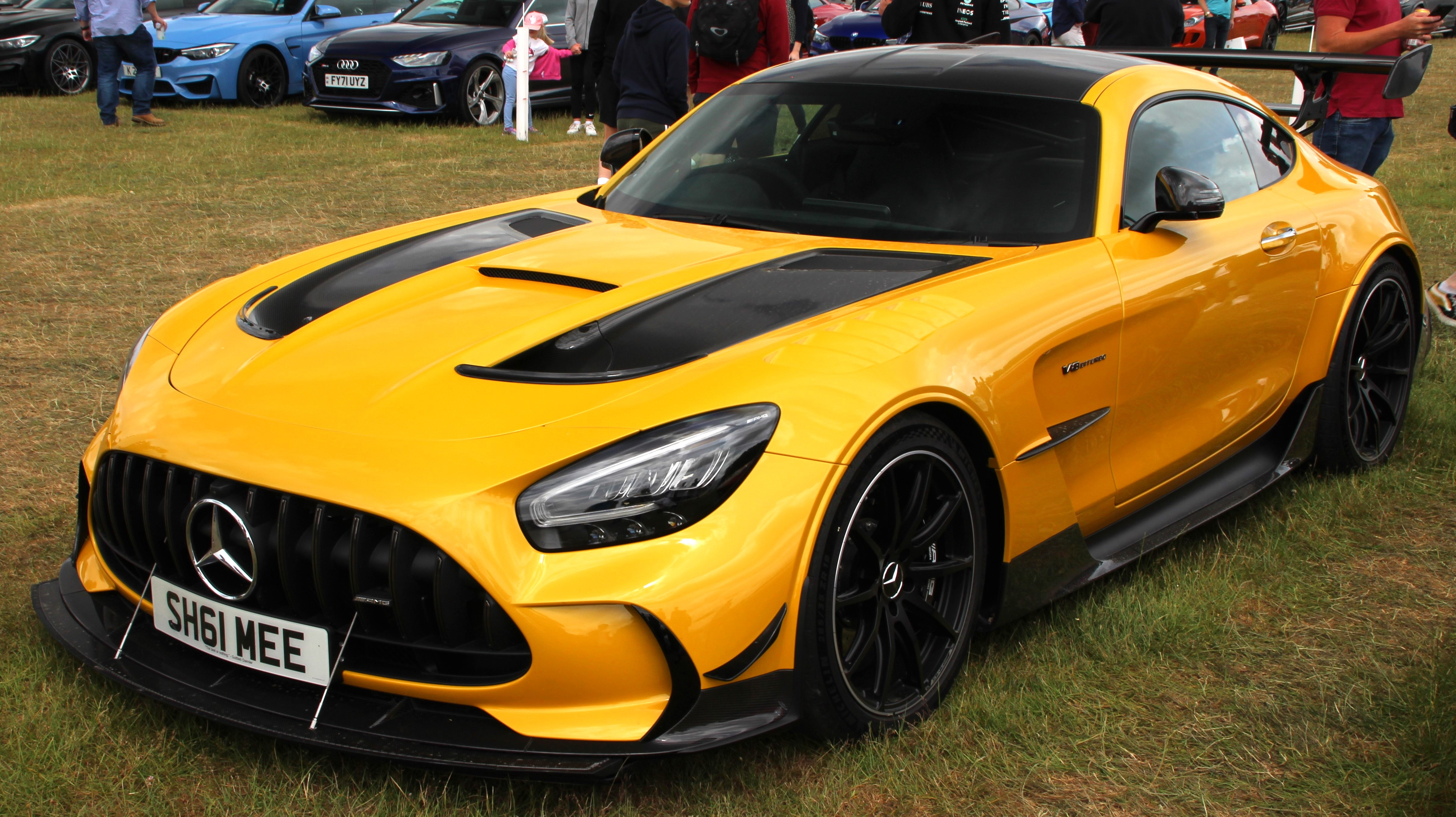
AMG GT Black Series

AMG Black Series models are exclusive flagship models with the maximum in performance technology for AMG road cars. The AMG Performance Studio in Affalterbach is responsible for the upgrades that make an AMG into an AMG Black Series model. The Black Series treatment is only available on 2 door vehicles, which includes weight reduction, bucket seats, exterior alterations, interior alterations, higher power, greater traction, handling, and significantly greater overall performance. Black Series models are known as street-legal race cars.

- SLK 55 AMG Black Series
- CLK 63 AMG Black Series
- SL 65 AMG Black Series
- C 63 AMG Black Series
- SLS AMG Black Series
- AMG GT Black Series

The SLS AMG Black Series was tested by Motor Trend to have a 0-60 mph time of 3.2 seconds, and a quarter mile time of 11.1 seconds at 129.8 mph. The SLS AMG Black Series "demolished" the Motor Trend figure eight in just 23.1 seconds, beating the McLaren MP4-12C, Ferrari 458 Italia, Audi R8 V10 Plus, and the SRT Viper. The SLS AMG Black Series had the same 1:19 time as the Lamborghini Murciélago LP670-4 SuperVeloce, the Ferrari Enzo, and beat the Ferrari 458 Italia, Lamborghini Gallardo LP 560-4, Porsche 997 GT2, and Nissan GT-R around the Top Gear test track.

As of May 2026, the AMG GT Black Series is the fifth fastest car around the Nürburgring Nordschleife.

== Non-Mercedes AMG models ==
AMG is primarily associated with Mercedes-Benz, having been fully owned by the company since 2005, but it has also produced special variants of some Mitsubishi and Honda models.

=== Mitsubishi AMG models ===
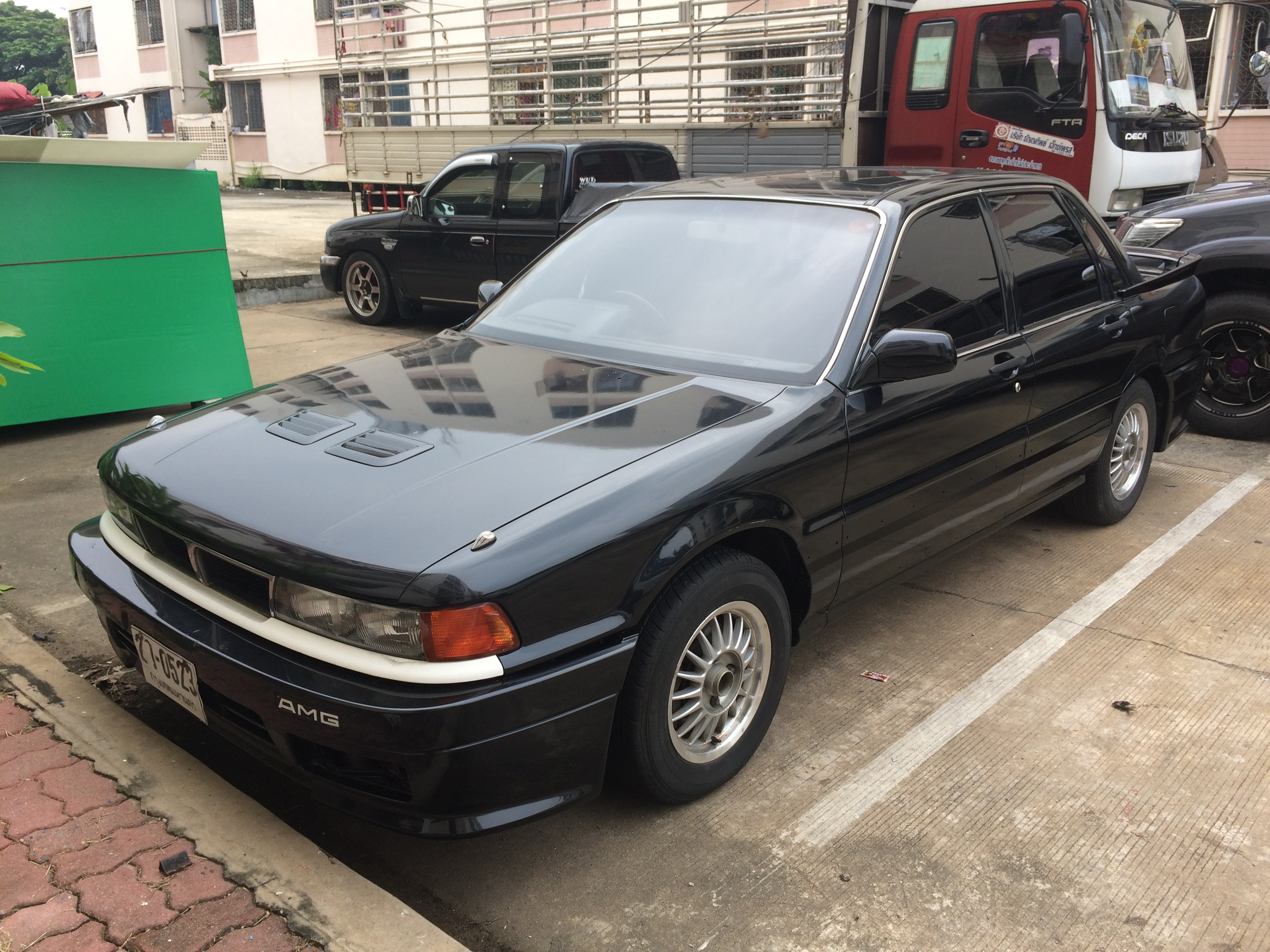
Mitsubishi Galant AMG

AMG's relationship with Mitsubishi began in 1987 with an enhanced version of the second-generation Debonair, known as the Mitsubishi Debonair V3000 Royal AMG. This model did not feature performance upgrades but included a body kit, wheels, steering wheel, and AMG badges. A long-wheelbase version was later introduced.

In 1989, the Mitsubishi Galant AMG was launched, with about 500 units produced for the Japanese domestic market until 1991. The vehicle was equipped with an AMG-tuned Mitsubishi 4G63 engine producing 170 PS (125 kW) and featured a body kit, alloy wheels, and a full leather interior.

=== Honda AMG models ===
During the 1980s and 1990s, AMG developed sports variants of the Honda Ballade in South Africa. These models, known as Honda Ballade AMGs, were based on the fourth- and fifth-generation Honda Civics. They were equipped with lower Eibach springs, 15- or 16-inch Remotec aluminium wheels, and larger rear spoilers. The 180i models were powered by 1.8-litre Honda B18B4 engines, potentially tuned to 173 hp (129 kW), while 160i versions with 1.6-litre engines were also available.

The partnership between Mercedes-Benz and Honda in South Africa was driven by Mercedes' desire to expand its local lineup with more affordable models, while Honda sought to enter the South African market. Due to Mercedes' reluctance to invest in an entry-level model and Honda's lack of infrastructure and brand recognition in the country, a deal was made where Mercedes-Benz South Africa would build and sell Honda models. The South African Honda Ballades were essentially rebadged Honda Civics, featuring additional luxury equipment and positioned below models such as the Mercedes 190.

== See also ==
- List of German cars
- Alpina
- Audi Sport GmbH
- BMW M
- Brabus
- Hyundai N
- Opel Performance Center
