= Aspach, Baden-Württemberg =

Aspach
- Municipality
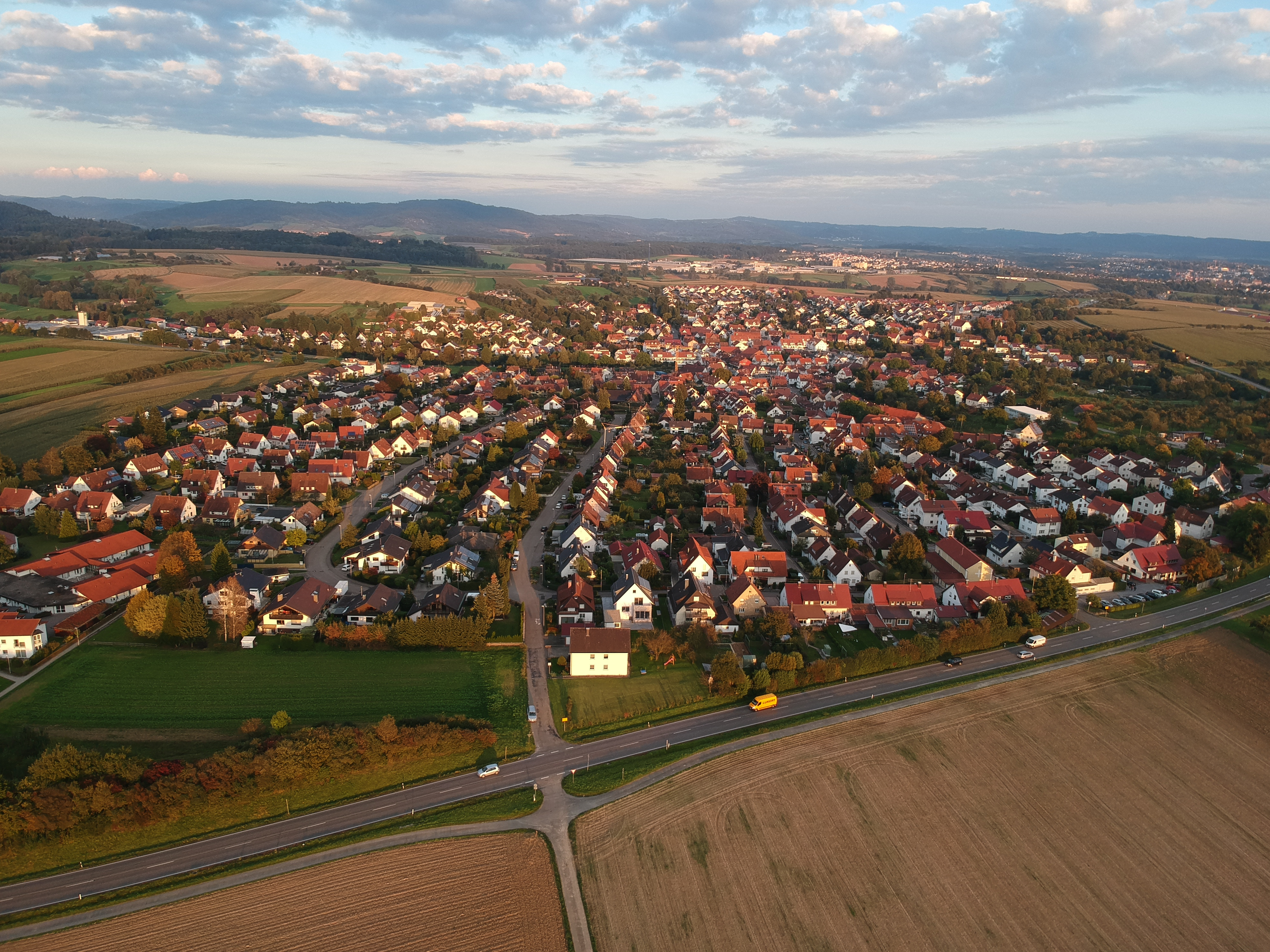
- Großaspach

- Coat of arms

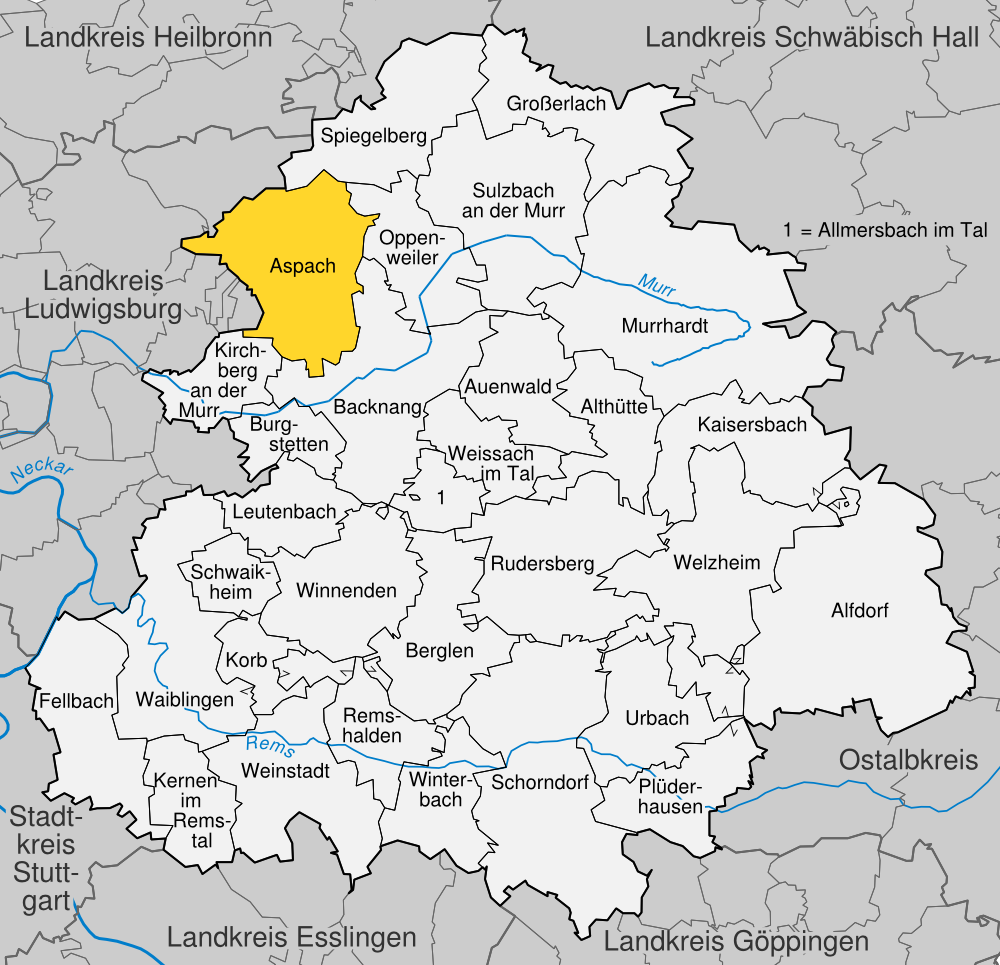
- Location of Aspach within Rems-Murr-Kreis district
- Interactive map of Aspach
- Location within Germany Location within Baden-Württemberg
- Coordinates: 48°58′00″N 09°23′51″E
- Country: Germany
- State: Baden-Württemberg
- Admin. region: Stuttgart
- District: Rems-Murr-Kreis

Government
  - Mayor (2018–26): Sabine Welte-Hauff

Area
  - Total: 35.45 km^{2} (13.69 sq mi)
- Elevation: 295 m (968 ft)

Population (2025-12-31)
  - Total: 8,228
  - Density: 232.1/km^{2} (601.1/sq mi)
- Time zone: UTC+01:00 (CET)
  - Summer (DST): UTC+02:00 (CEST)
- Postal codes: 71546
- Dialling codes: 07148, 07191
- Vehicle registration: WN
- Website: www.aspach.de

Aspach (German pronunciation: [ˈaspax]) is a community in the Rems-Murr-Kreis in Germany, near Backnang.

Aspach is made up of four, formerly independent villages: Großaspach, Kleinaspach, Allmersbach and Rietenau. In 1972, the four villages joined forces under the name Aspach. The villages were founded between 950AD and 1150AD. Rietenau is home to natural springs and used to be a popular Spa until early 1900. Water from Rietenau is still bottled today. The main village, Großaspach, is the birthplace of Hans Werner Aufrecht, co-founder of AMG Engine Production and Development, more commonly known as AMG, as well as the meaning of the "G" in the name. It is commonly mistaken for being the company's first location, but no AMG office, factory, or research facility has ever been located there - except for the garage, where Aufrecht and Melcher (the M in AMG) started out tuning cars and engines.

== Sports ==
Großaspach is the home of SG Sonnenhof Großaspach, football club, playing in the 3. Liga.

== Notable people ==
- Johann Conrad Weiser Sr. (1662–1746), was a German soldier, baker, farmer and was founder of their settlement of Weiser's Dorf, now known as Middleburgh, New York
- Hans Werner Aufrecht (* 1938), engineer and founder of AMG, now Mercedes-AMG GmbH, was born in Großaspach
