= Hans Werner Aufrecht =

Co-founder of AMG

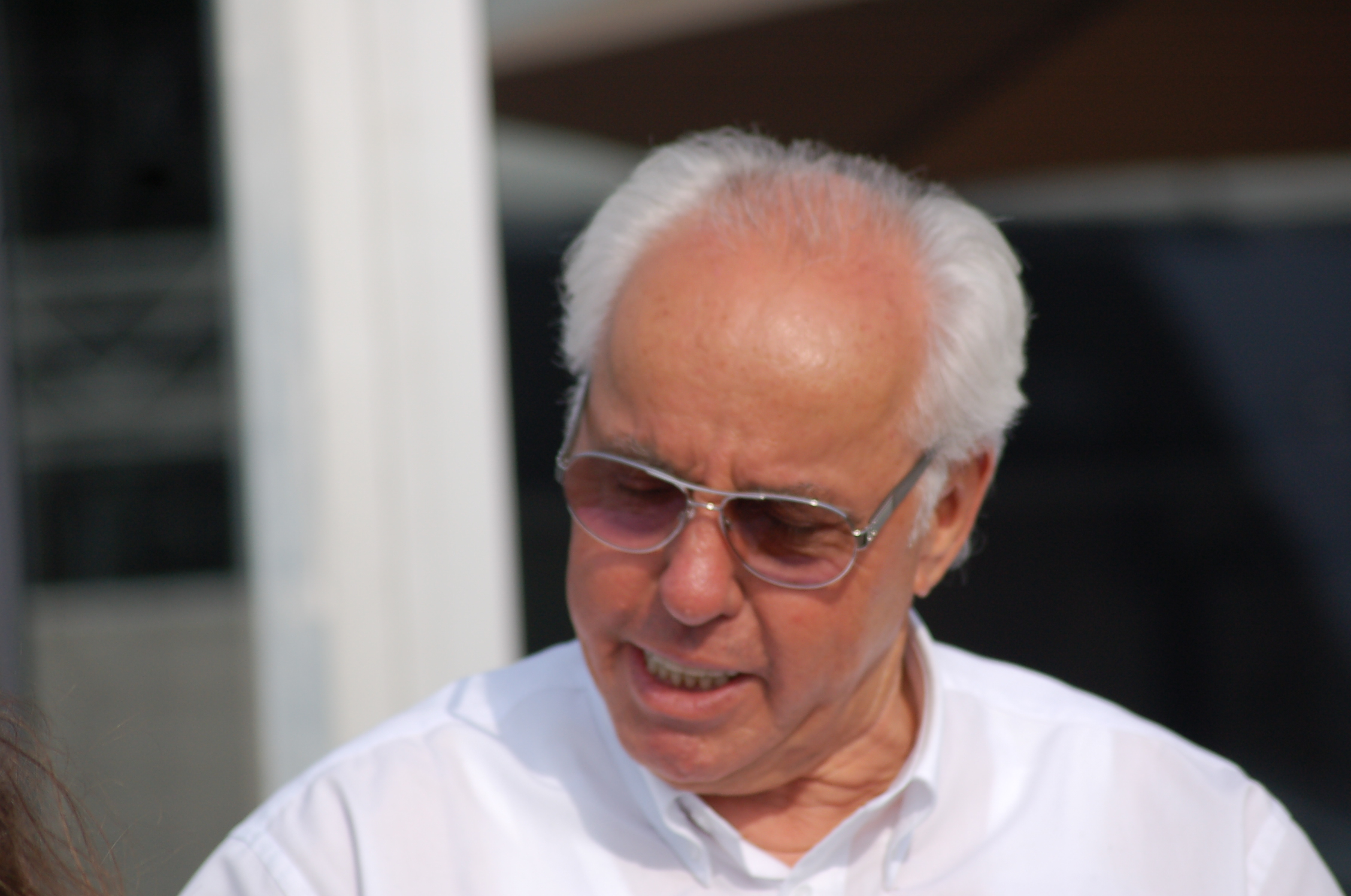
- Hans Werner Aufrecht
- Born: 28 December 1938 (age 86); Großaspach, Württemberg, Nazi Germany
- Occupation(s): Automotive engineer, entrepreneur
- Years active: 1967–present
- Known for: AMG Engine Production and Development

Hans Werner Aufrecht (born 28 December 1938 in Großaspach, Germany) was in 1967 along with Erhard Melcher one of the founders of AMG Engine Production and Development, a current subsidiary of Mercedes-Benz.

When the company and the name "AMG" was acquired by Mercedes-Benz in the late 1990s, he used his initials for the name of Mercedes' official racing team, HWA Team. In 1999, the first car raced under that team name was the ill-fated Mercedes-Benz CLR. Since in 2000 the Deutsche Tourenwagen Masters was started, the HWA team is in charge of Mercedes-AMG official factory entry in DTM.
