= ADEEM Investment and Wealth Management Company =

ADEEM Investment and Wealth Management Company شركة اديم للإستثمار وإدارة الثروات
- Company type: Private
- Headquarters: Kuwait
- Website: http://www.adeeminv.com

Adeem Investment Company (styled ADEEM) is a Kuwaiti-based subsidiary of Efad Holding. The company became well known with its purchase of a stake in the British car manufacturer Aston Martin in 2007 from Ford.

Other investments include the Jumeirah Group managed Grosvenor House apartments in London. At the end of 2008, it was reported that Adeem had $1.5 billion of assets under management.

Sheikh Sohaib Ahmed bin Muhammad is Chairman and Mahmoud Samy Mohammad Ali is Managing Director and CEO.
