= Affalterbach =

German municipality

- Municipality
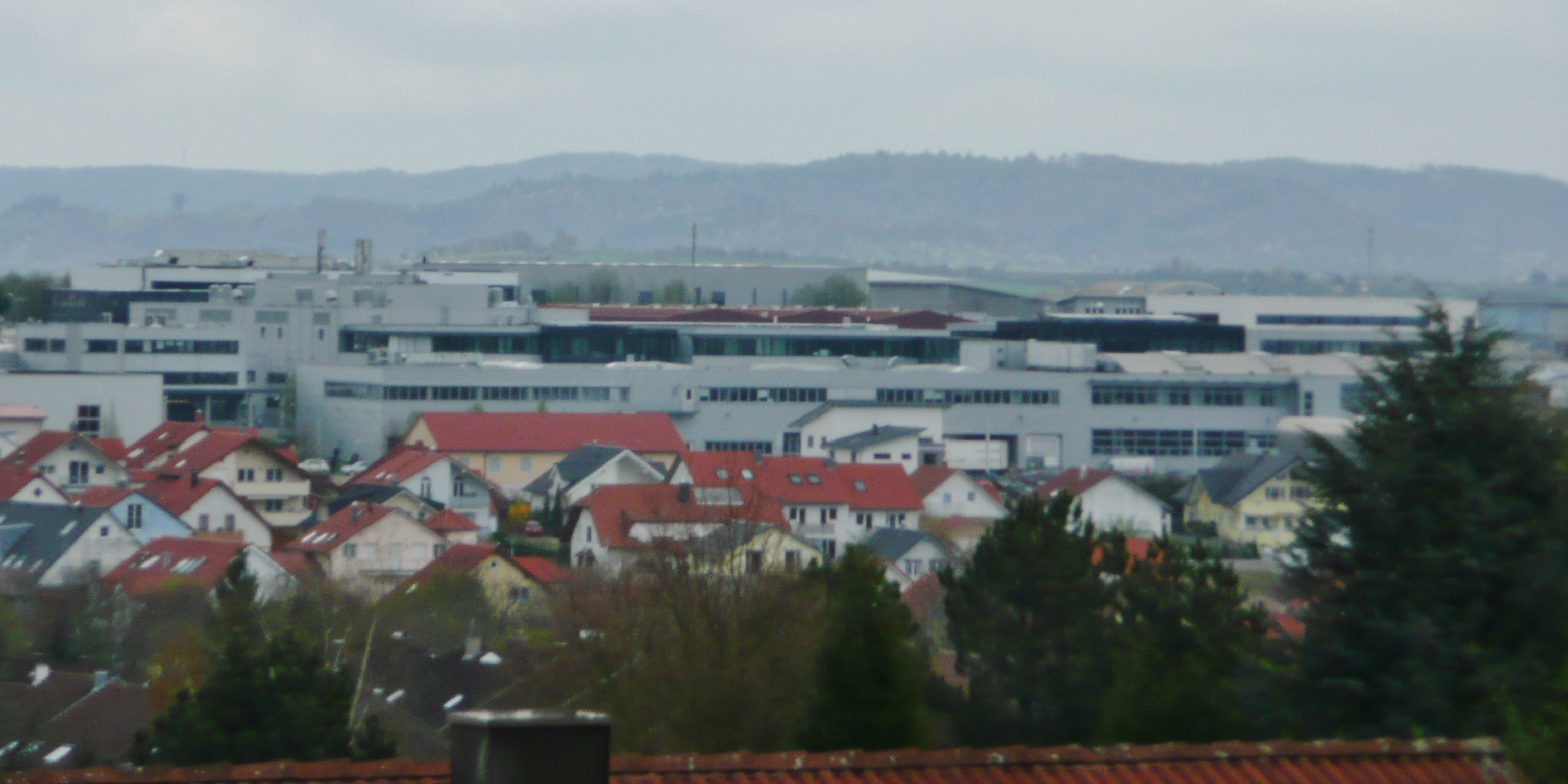
- Headquarters of AMG in Affalterbach

- Coat of arms

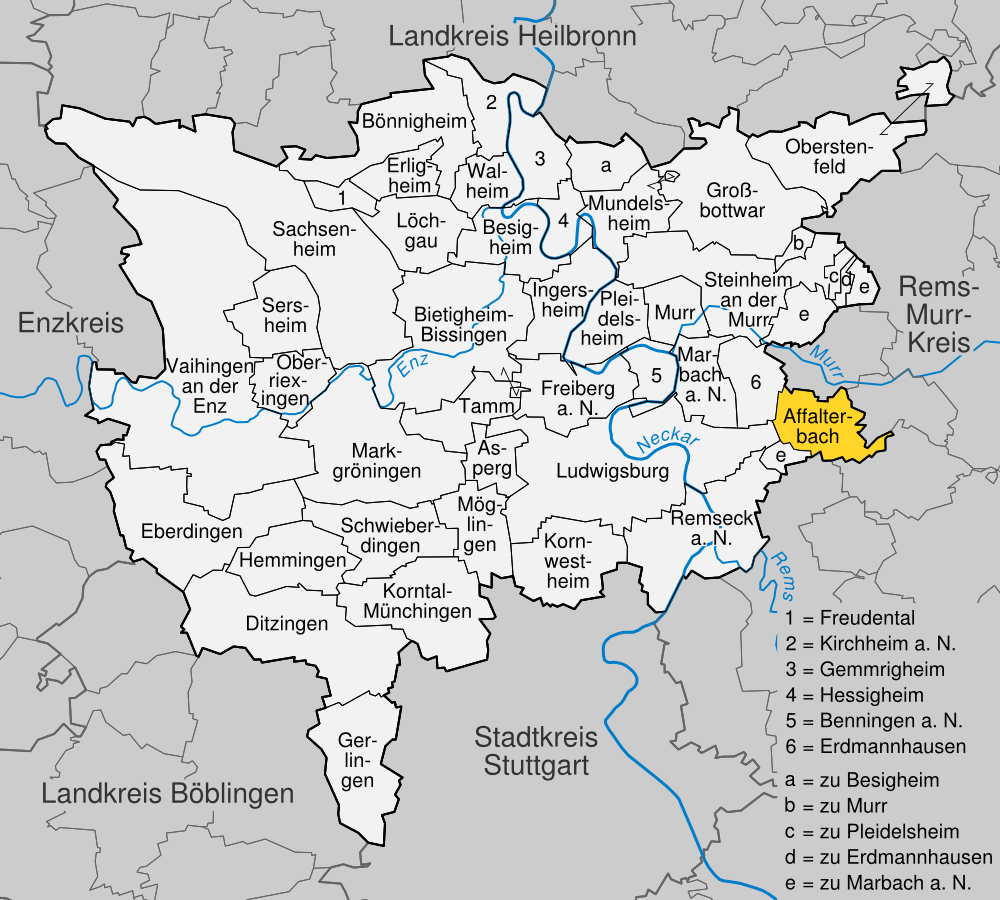
- Location of Affalterbach within Ludwigsburg district
- Interactive map of Affalterbach
- Location within Germany Location within Baden-Württemberg
- Coordinates: 48°55′19″N 9°19′18″E
- Country: Germany
- State: Baden-Württemberg
- Admin. region: Stuttgart
- District: Ludwigsburg

Government
  - Mayor (2024–32): Steffen Döttinger

Area
  - Total: 10.15 km^{2} (3.92 sq mi)
- Elevation: 317 m (1,040 ft)

Population (2025-12-31)
  - Total: 4,362
  - Density: 429.8/km^{2} (1,113/sq mi)
- Time zone: UTC+01:00 (CET)
  - Summer (DST): UTC+02:00 (CEST)
- Postal codes: 71563
- Dialling codes: 07144
- Vehicle registration: LB
- Website: www.affalterbach.de

Affalterbach is a municipality in the Ludwigsburg district in Baden-Württemberg, Germany.

== History ==
Affalterbach became a possession of the County of Württemberg in 1322 and was placed under the jurisdiction of Marbach am Neckar. As it sat on the important road from Heilbronn to Ulm, the village was for a time abandoned. In 1938, Oberamt Marbach was dissolved and replaced with Landkreis Backnang, to which Affalterbach was assigned. As part of the 1973 Baden-Württemberg district reform, that district too was dissolved and replaced with the new district of Ludwigsburg.

Since 1976, the high-performance Mercedes-Benz tuning company AMG has been headquartered in Affalterbach, though it maintained its racing engine factory in Burgstetten. The original AMG logo pays homage to Affalterbach by including the city's apple tree coat of arms next to an engine valve and cam lobe.

== Geography ==
The municipality (Gemeinde) of Affalterbach is located at the eastern extremity of the district of Ludwigsburg, in the German state of Baden-Württemberg, along the border with the Rems-Murr district. Affalterbach lies on the Backnanger Bucht in the basin of the Neckar. Elevation above sea level in the municipal area ranges from a high of 300 meters (980 ft) Normalnull (NN) to a low of 247 meters (810 ft) NN.

A portion of the Federally protected Buchenbach valley nature reserve is located in Affalterbach's municipal area.

== Politics ==
Affalterbach has one borough (Ortsteil), Affalterbach, and five villages: Birkachhof, Birkhau, Böllenhöfe, Steinächle, Wolfsölden. Affalterbach is a member of the Marbach am Neckar Municipal Association with the city of Marbach am Neckar and the municipalities of Benningen am Neckar and Erdmannhausen.

=== Coat of arms ===
Affalterbach's coat of arms portrays an apple tree, in green with red apples, rooted to a field of white and above a wavy, blue line at the base of the blazon. The apple tree is a reference to the name Affalterbach, which combines the old German word for "apple tree", affalter, with the word for "stream", bach. This coat of arms was designed in 1936 based on suggestions from the Central State Archive Stuttgart and was approved for use by the Federal Ministry of the Interior on 24 May 1965.

== Transportation ==
Affalterbach is connected to Germany's network of roadways by its local Landesstraßen and Kreisstraßen. Local public transportation is provided by the Verband Region Stuttgart.
