= Erhard Melcher =

German engineer

Erhard Melcher (born 17. November 1939) is a German engineer who was one of the founders of AMG Engine Production and Development, a current subsidiary of Mercedes-Benz.

Melcher began his career at Daimler in the 1960s working for their development department. Following Mercedes Benzes halt of racing activities Melcher and Hans-Werner Aufrecht founded AMG.

When Aufrecht moved AMG to larger premises in Affalterbach in 1971, Melcher left the company to work independently at his new company MKB Manufaktur in Burgstall. He and his small company keep supplying engine designs and parts to AMG, e.g. for the Mercedes Formula 3 engine that dominates the Formula Three Euroseries.
