= Mercedes-Benz 430 =

Mercedes-Benz has sold a number of automobiles with the "430" model name:

- 1999 C208
  - 1999 CLK430
- 1997-2005 W163
  - 1999 ML430 4.3 L V8
- W210
  - E430
    - S430
