= Mercedes-Benz SLK-Class (R170) =

Mercedes-Benz SLK (R170)

Overview
- Manufacturer: Daimler-Benz (1996–1998); DaimlerChrysler (1998–2004)
- Production: July 1996 – April 2004
- Assembly: Germany: Bremen; South Africa: East London
- Designer: Bruno Sacco (1991); Michael Mauer (1993); Murat Günak (1993)

Body and chassis
- Class: Sports car
- Body style: 2-door roadster
- Layout: Longitudinal front-engine, rear-wheel drive
- Related: Mercedes-Benz C-Class (W202) Mercedes-Benz CLK-Class (C208); Chrysler Crossfire

Powertrain
- Engine: Petrol: 2.0 L M111.946 I4; 2.0 – 2.3 L M111 supercharged I4; 3.2 L M112 V6; 3.2 L M112 supercharged V6
- Transmission: 5-speed manual (Getrag); 6-speed manual (Getrag); 5-speed 5G-Tronic automatic

Dimensions
- Wheelbase: 2,400 mm (94.5 in)
- Length: 3,995–4,010 mm (157.3–157.9 in)
- Width: 1,715 mm (67.5 in)
- Height: 1,269–1,284 mm (50.0–50.6 in)
- Kerb weight: 1,270–1,495 kg (2,800–3,296 lb)

Chronology
- Successor: Mercedes-Benz SLK-Class (R171)

The first-generation Mercedes-Benz SLK-Class (R170) is the first generation of the Mercedes-Benz SLK-Class range of compact luxury roadsters manufactured by Mercedes-Benz from 1996 until 2004, using a shortened variant of the W202 Mercedes C-Class platform.

With over 300,000 manufactured, the first generation SLK was replaced by the Mercedes R171 SLK in 2004.

The SLK nameplate derives from the roadster's design ethos: to be sportlich (sporty), leicht (light) and kurz (compact). It was sold in North America for the 1996–2004 model years.

== Development and launch ==
The R170 Mercedes SLK is based on the SLK I Concept, presented during early 1994 at the Turin Motor Show, and SLK II Concept, presented during late 1994 at the Paris Motor Show, which is a two-seater roadster concept car that features a folding metal electro-hydraulic roof, dubbed 'vario-roof' by Mercedes, and takes 25 seconds to operate. A German design patent was filed on 30 September 1993, with the final production version of the SLK introduced at the Turin Motor Show on 22 April 1996. Construction of pre-production test cars began in October 1995, with mass production beginning in July 1996.

The R170 SLK is based on the W202 C-Class platform, sharing many drivetrain and chassis components, as well as using a shortened version of the floor pan. The wheelbase is also identical to the wheelbase of the 190SL and 300SL, at 2,400 mm (94.5 in).

The platform of the SLK is also used by the Chrysler Crossfire, which shares 80% of its components with the R170.

== Equipment ==
Standard equipment includes power seats, power windows, power steering, dual-zone air conditioning, dimmable interior mirror, and alloy wheels. Safety features include front and side driver and passenger airbags, anti-lock brakes, and electronic stability control. Options included an AMG body design package, also sometimes called a "sport package" including body colour side skirts, chromed tailpipes, 17-inch AMG alloy wheels on lower profile performance tires, and a sculpted front apron with black-mesh air intakes. Wider wheels were also available on SLK 230 Kompressor models. Other available options included a 5-speed "Touch Shift" 5G-Tronic automatic transmission, heated seats, xenon headlamps, a premium Bose sound system, a trunk-mounted 6-CD changer, 8-way power seats, and a manually telescoping steering wheel. Many of these options were standard on the SLK 32 AMG.

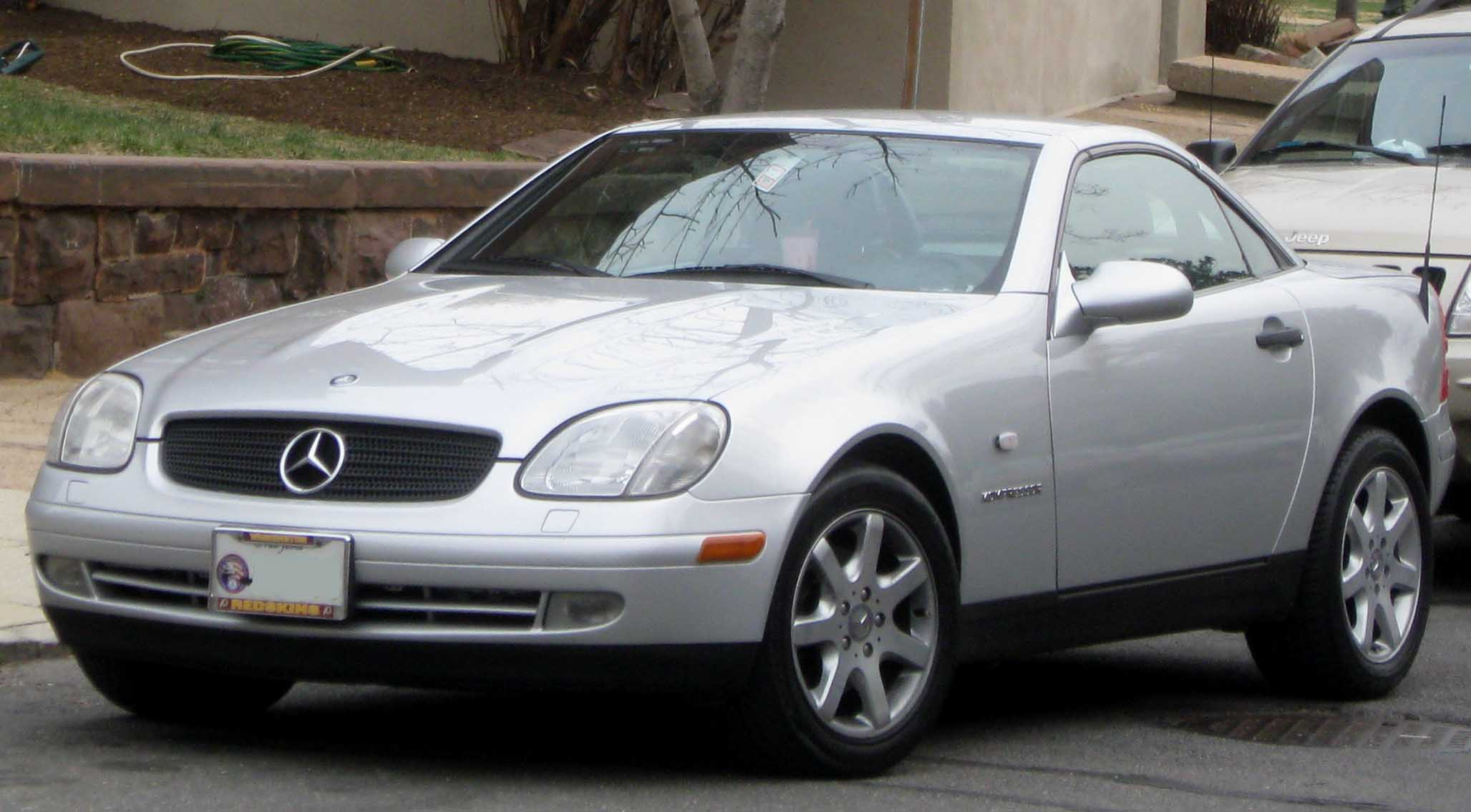
Pre-facelift SLK

== Models ==
=== SLK 200 Kompressor ===
The SLK 200 Kompressor was initially sold exclusively in Italy, Netherlands, Portugal, Turkey, and Greece, and was only available with the Getrag five-speed manual transmission. After the 2000 facelift, this model was introduced to the worldwide market.

=== Engines ===
Model	Engine	Power	Torque	0-100 km/h (0-62 mph)	Years
SLK 200	M111.946; 2.0 L I4	100 kW (136 PS; 134 hp) at 5,000 rpm	190 N⋅m (140 lb⋅ft) at 3,700–4,500 rpm	9.3 s / 9.7 s	1996–2000
SLK 200; Kompressor	M111.943; 2.0 L I4 supercharged	141 kW (192 PS; 189 hp) at 5,300 rpm	270 N⋅m (199 lb⋅ft) at 2,500–4,800 rpm	7.6 s /	1996–2000
SLK 200; Kompressor	M111.958; 2.0 L I4 supercharged	120 kW (163 PS; 161 hp) at 5,300 rpm	230 N⋅m (170 lb⋅ft) at 2,500–4,800 rpm	8.2 s / 8.5 s	2000–2004
SLK 230; Kompressor	M111.973; 2.3 L I4 supercharged	142 kW (193 PS; 190 hp) at 5,300 rpm	280 N⋅m (207 lb⋅ft) at 2,500–4,800 rpm	7.3 s / 7.4 s	1996–2000
SLK 230; Kompressor	M111.983; 2.3 L I4 supercharged	145 kW (197 PS; 194 hp) at 5,500 rpm	280 N⋅m (207 lb⋅ft) at 2,500 rpm	7.2 s / 7.3 s	2000–2004
SLK 320	M112.947; 3.2 L V6	160 kW (218 PS; 215 hp) at 5,700 rpm	310 N⋅m (229 lb⋅ft) at 3,000–4,600 rpm	6.9 s / 6.9 s	2000–2004
SLK 32 AMG	M112.960; 3.2 L V6 supercharged	260 kW (354 PS; 349 hp) at 6,100 rpm	450 N⋅m (332 lb⋅ft) at 4,400 rpm	/ 5.2 s	2001–2004

*Acceleration times are for manual/automatic gearbox

== SLK 32 AMG ==
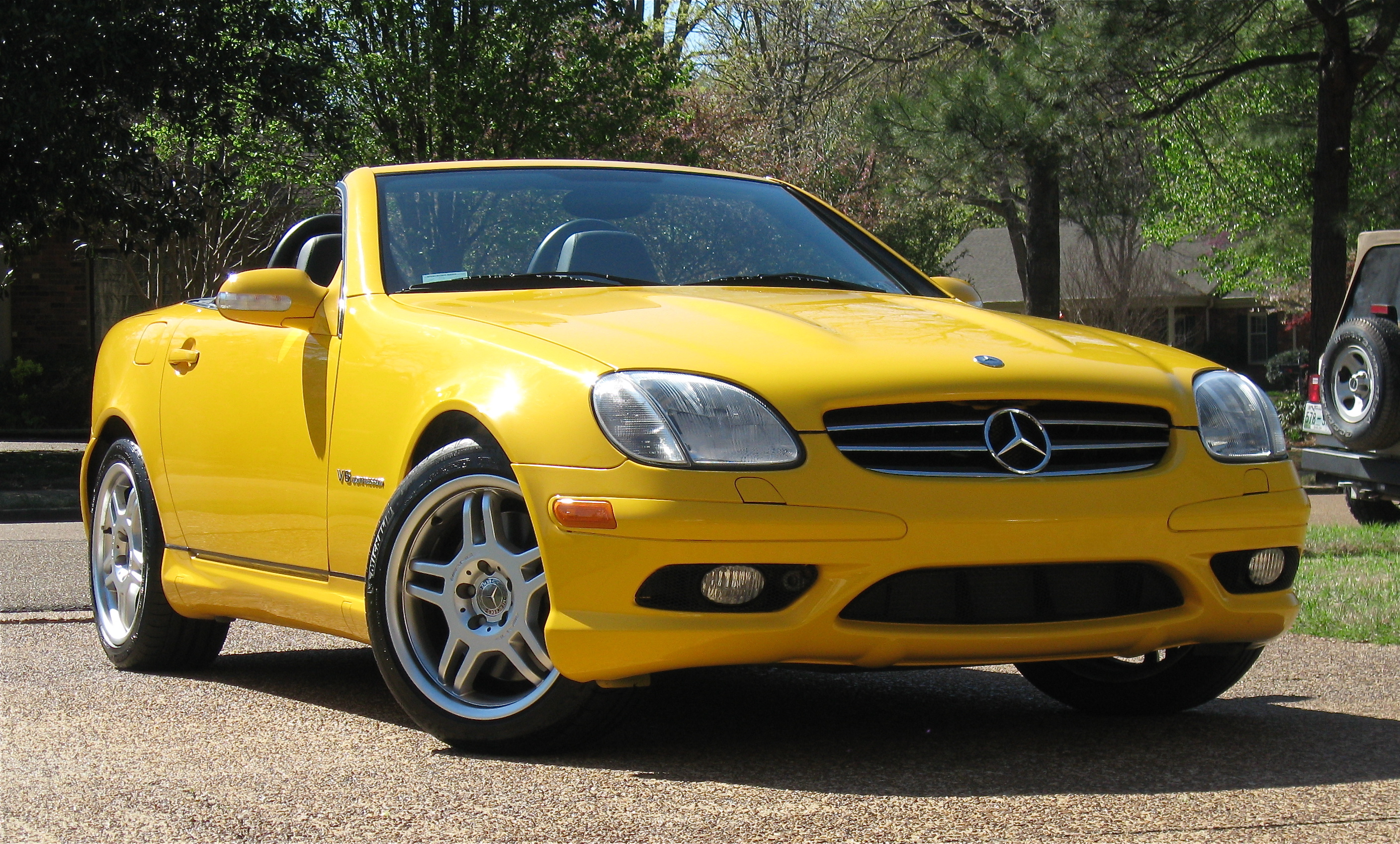
SLK 32 AMG

The SLK 32 AMG was introduced in 2001, designed to rival the BMW M Roadster and Porsche Boxster S. The car features an upgraded version of the M112 engine found in the SLK 320, now featuring a helical twin-screw supercharger and water-to-air intercooler.

The SLK 32 AMG introduced Mercedes' new SpeedShift 5G-Tronic (automatic) transmission, that allows for manual shifting of the gears, and faster automatic downshifts before overtaking. There was no manual transmission option available for the SLK 32 AMG.

The SLK 32 AMG features a more angular steering wheel, AMG instrument dials, an updated front and rear bumper with larger air intakes, and larger brakes; from 300 mm (12 in), upgraded to 334 mm (13 in) in diameter. SLK 32 production started from January 2001, to March 2004. A total of 4,333 were produced; 979 were sold in Germany, 2,056 were imported to the US, and 263 to the UK.

== Model year changes ==
=== 1998 ===
- Passenger airbag will now automatically deactivate if Mercedes-branded child seat is fitted

=== 1999 ===
- Storage net, automatic-dimming rear view mirrors, and vehicle motion sensing alarm added
- Introduction of manual transmission and AMG Sport package options, which included Sport aero body kit, 17" staggered AMG wheels, HD sway bars, and performance exhaust

=== 2000 facelift ===
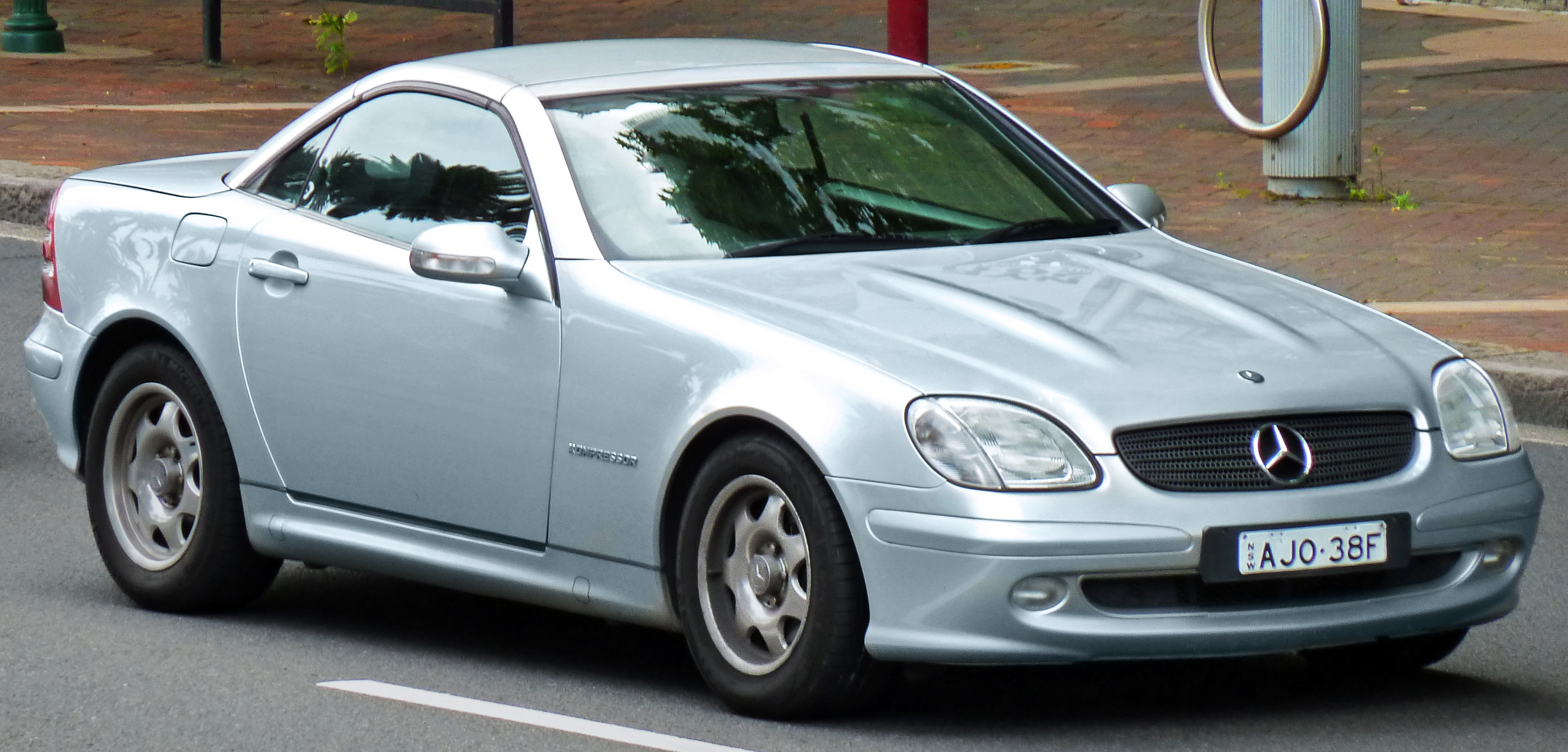
SLK 200 Kompressor (facelift)

Production for facelift models began after February 2000. Major changes include:

- Exterior design changes including: redesigned front and rear bumpers, a redesigned silver grille and taillights, body-colour painted side-skirts and door handles, integrated indicators in wing mirrors, and stainless steel trim in the exhaust
- Interior design changes including: a restyled steering wheel and transmission shifter, and more supportive sports seats
- Naturally-aspirated SLK 200 discontinued, SLK 230 Kompressor engine updated, SLK 320 introduced, and SLK 200 Kompressor now introduced for worldwide market
- Electronic stability control upgraded
- The fuel tank volume was increased from 45 L (12 US gal) to 53 L (14 US gal)

=== 2001 ===
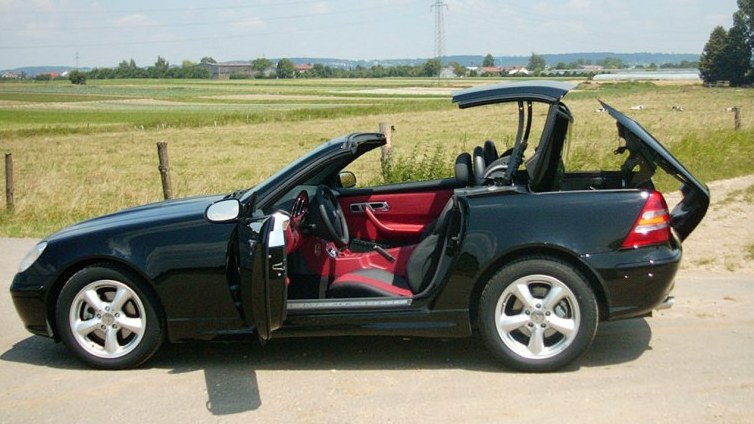
SLK roof operation

- Six-speed manual transmission introduced, replacing the existing five-speed manual transmission
- SLK 32 AMG high performance variant introduced

== Safety ==
Euro NCAP test results* Mercedes-Benz SLK (2002)
Test	Score	Rating
Adult occupant:	26	4 /5 stars
Pedestrian:	8	1 /4 stars

== Production volumes ==
The following are production figures for the R170 SLK:

Model	Total
SLK 200	44,846
SLK 200 Kompressor	67,802
SLK 230 Kompressor	160,825
SLK 320	33,416
SLK 32 AMG	4,333
Total	311,222

== Awards ==
- The R170 Mercedes SLK was on Car and Driver's Ten Best list for 1997.
- Named ‘North American Car of the Year’ for 1997.
