= Kompressor (Mercedes-Benz) =

Marketing name by Mercedes-Benz

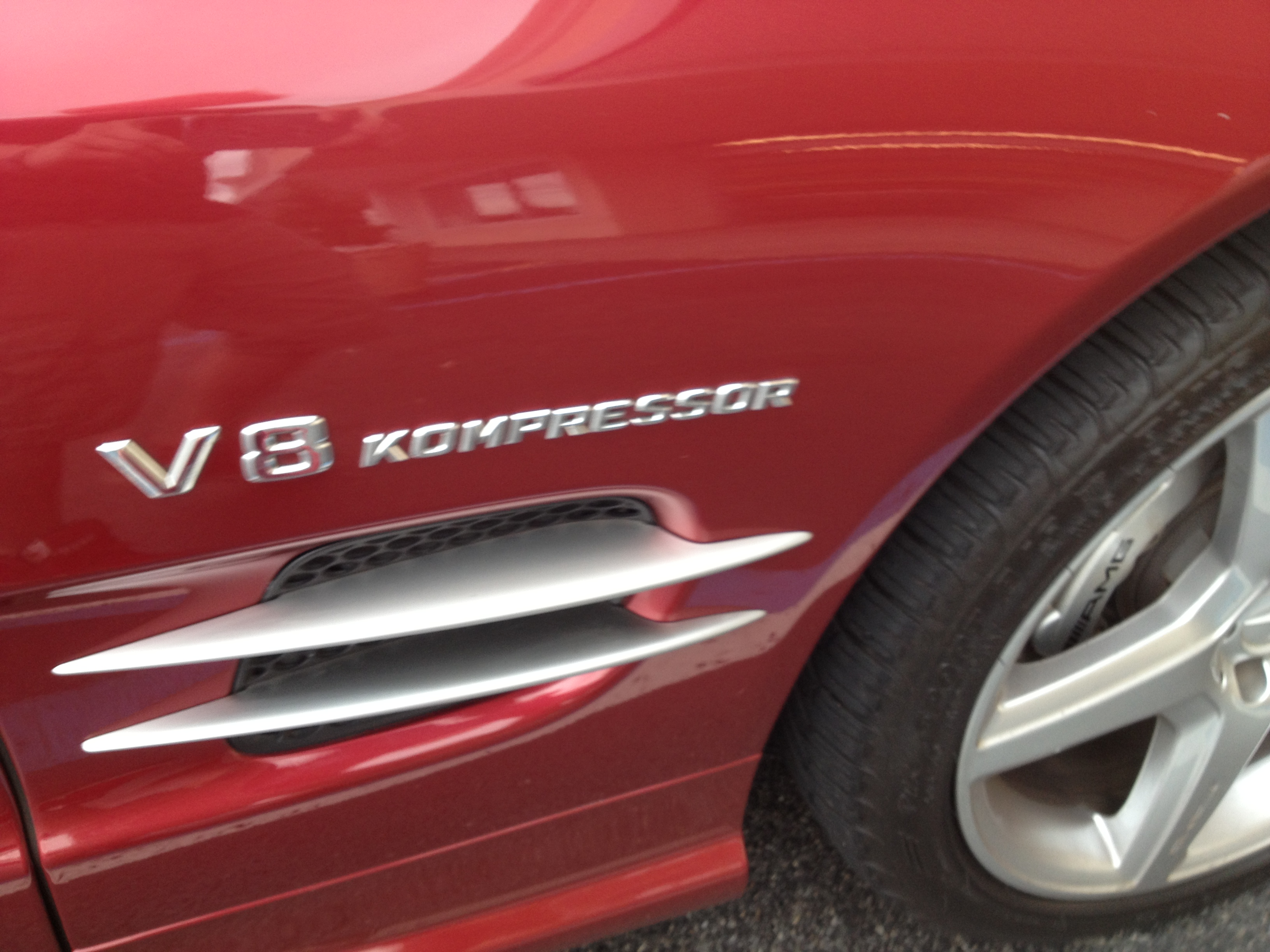
SL55 AMG bearing the Kompressor badge.

Kompressor (stylized as KOMPRESSOR) is a marketing name for forced induction (supercharged) Mercedes-Benz engines. The term is not widely used by other motor manufacturers.

The first Mercedes supercharger was developed in 1921 by a Daimler-Benz team with assistance from Ferdinand Porsche. Mercedes became the first manufacturer to install superchargers on some production models. The designation "K" on Mercedes usually means "Kurz", or short, but can mean "Kompressor".

== Models with Kompressor option ==
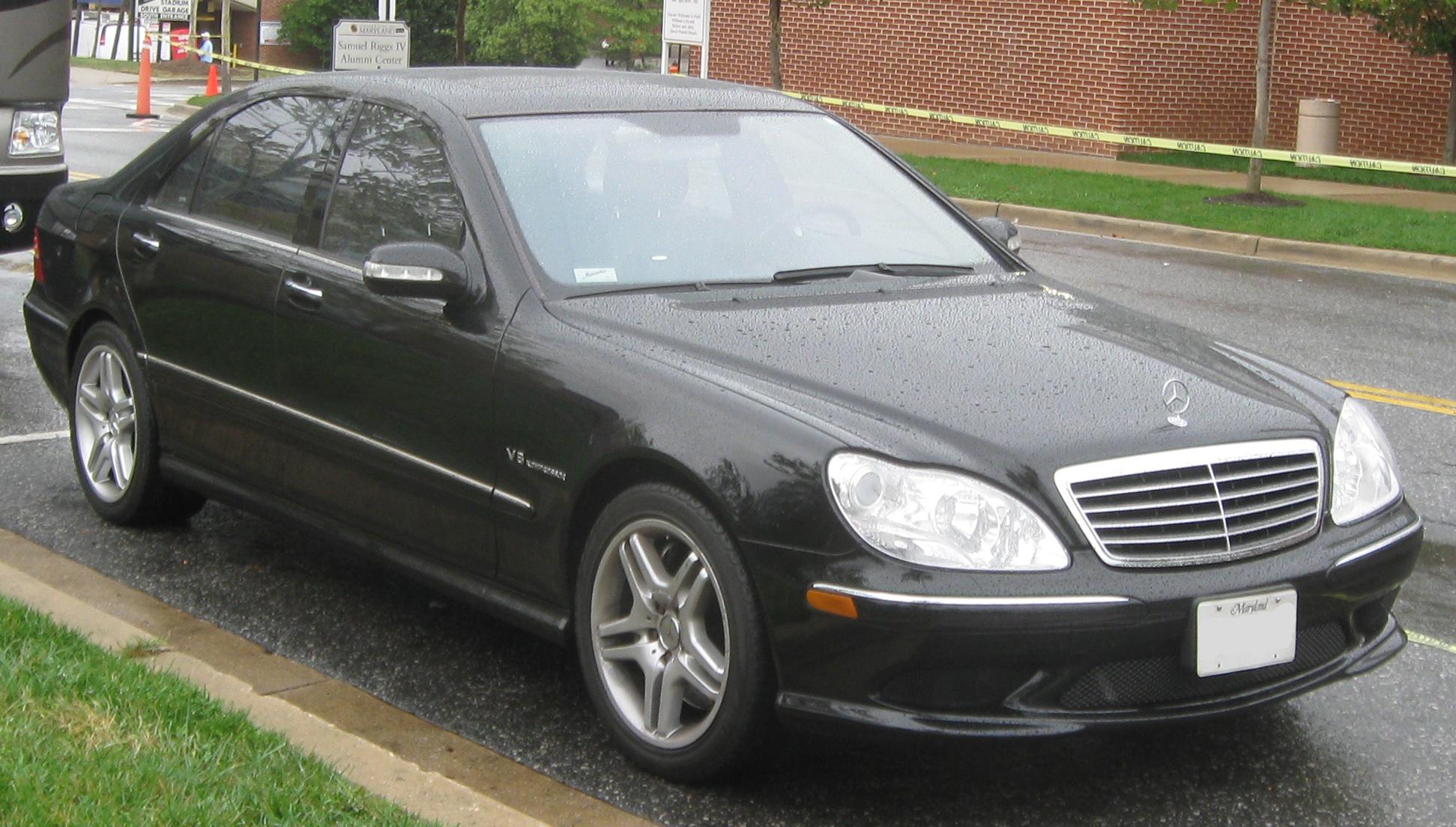
A Mercedes-Benz S 55 AMG (W220), the only iteration of the S-Class offered with Kompressor

- Mercedes-Benz W202
- Mercedes-Benz W210
- Mercedes-Benz W203
- Mercedes-Benz W204 (2007-2010)
- Mercedes-Benz R170
- Mercedes-Benz R171
- Mercedes-Benz C208
- Mercedes-Benz C209
- Mercedes-Benz W211 (E200 and E55 AMG)
- Mercedes-Benz W220 (S55 AMG)
- Mercedes-Benz C215 (CL55 AMG)
- Mercedes-Benz R230 (SL55 AMG)
- Mercedes-Benz W219 (CLS55 AMG)

== Applications ==
=== 230 1.8L I4 Kompressor ===
In 2002 for the 2003 model year, a new family of supercharged four cylinder engines, dubbed M271, debuted for the entire C-Class range. All of them used the same 1.8-litre engine, with different designations according to horsepower levels, including a version powered by natural gas. The C 230 Kompressor variant sported 142 kW (190 hp). The newer 1.8-litre was less powerful but smoother and more efficient than the older 2.3-litre engine 141 kW (192 PS) compared to 142 kW (193 PS).

Initial engine options comprised the C 180 (139 PS), C220 (143 PS), C 200 Kompressor, and C 230 Kompressor. In 2003, Mercedes-Benz added the C 180 Kompressor, followed by the C 200 compressor in 2003-2007 (187 hp), and finally the C 160 Kompressor in 2005. The C 230 SportCoupé was powered by a 2.3-litre supercharged, four-cylinder motor. It offered 143 kW (192 hp) and 270 N⋅m (200 lb⋅ft) of torque. However, the supercharged inline-four engine was considered to be coarse and noisy at the high end.

=== "32" 3.2 L V6 Kompressor ===
Powertrain consists of AMG SPEEDSHIFT black series 5-speed automatic transmission mated to an AMG 3.2 liter V6 Kompressor engine with an output of 260 kW/349 hp and 332 lb⋅ft (450 N⋅m) @ 4,400 rpm. The engine is a special version of the 3.2 L (3199 cc) M112 E32, fitted with a helical twin-screw supercharger and water-to-air intercooler. The supercharger was developed in conjunction with IHI and features Teflon-coated rotors producing overall boost of 14.5 psi (1 bar). Compared to the standard M112 engine, the AMG version also has a new crankshaft, new con rods and pistons, an oil pump with a 70-percent increased capacity, lightweight camshafts, and stiffer valve springs for a redline of 6200 rpm, an increase of 200 rpm.

While rival BMW M developed the SMG-II automated manual for the BMW M3, the C32 and SLK32 have a 5-speed automatic transmission's "Speedshift" system which now has quicker response (up to 35 percent) to accelerator and shift selector movements.

The C32 had a smaller engine than its predecessors, the C36 AMG with the M104 3.6L I6 engine, and the C43 AMG powered by the M113 4.3L V8 engine. Nonetheless, the C32 AMG was capable of runs to 60 in 4.5 seconds, when reviewed by AutoCar on June 27, 2001, beating the BMW M3 and the Porsche 911.

- 3.2 L Supercharged M112 V6 AMG
  - 2002-2004 C32 AMG (sedan, wagon, and Sportcoupé)
  - 2001-2004 SLK32 AMG

=== "55" 5.4 L V8 ===
The M113 Kompressor, also nicknamed M113K, is supercharged variant of the M113 V8. It is a 5.4 L V8 engine with a Lysholm type twin screw supercharger and water-to-air intercooler. The supercharger was developed in conjunction with IHI and features Teflon-coated rotors, is found in the rest of the AMG 55 models which are typically midsized or larger vehicles. The published output according to Mercedes varies from 476 PS (350 kW; 469 hp) to 517 PS (380 kW; 510 hp) and 700 N⋅m (520 lb⋅ft) to 720 N⋅m (530 lb⋅ft), depending on various methods of power measurements and different ECU programming for national legislations. For instance, the E55 AMG's engine was at the low end, nonetheless it was still Mercedes-Benz's fastest sedan at the time, while the SL55 AMG's engine had the top output. Mercedes has claimed that a more restrictive exhaust system was responsible for cutting output on the E55 AMG, however some enthusiasts have managed to bump up horsepower to 505 on the E55 by incorporating some parts from the SL55.

The M113K was mated to the Speedshift 5-speed automatic transmission, which has a torque capacity of 796 lb⋅ft (1,079 N⋅m), as the newer 7G-Tronic introduced in 2003 is limited to 542 lb⋅ft (735 N⋅m), not enough to handle the torque from the supercharged V8.

The V8 S55 AMG had a comparable output to the V12-powered S600 throughout their production. The S55 AMG (2001–02) was outfitted with a 5.4L 354 hp (264 kW) V8 motor while the later versions (2003–06) sported the same motor, but supercharged to a rated 493 hp (386 kW). The S600 (2001–02) was outfitted with a 5.8L 362 hp (270 kW) V12 engine while the later versions (2003–06) sported a twin-turbocharged (or Bi-Turbo) 493 hp (368 kW) 5.5L V12. The justification for having two models with the same power is that the S55 AMG is sportier and more responsive, while the costlier S600 is more luxurious with a smoother ride.

AMG phased out the supercharged 5.4 L engines in favor of the new M156 V8 beginning in 2006, which was paired with 7G-Tronic. However, some enthusiasts were disappointed because the M156 produces less torque than the supercharged M155.

Applications:

- 2003-2006 CL 55 AMG
- 2002-2006 S 55 AMG
- 2002-2008 SL 55 AMG
- 2003-2006 E 55 AMG
- 2004-2006 CLK DTM AMG
- 2004-2011 G 55 AMG
- 2004-2006 CLS 55 AMG
- 2005 Fisker Tramonto V8
- 2005 Laraki Fulgura V8
