= Mercedes-Benz M111 engine =

Straight-4 cylinder engine from 1993

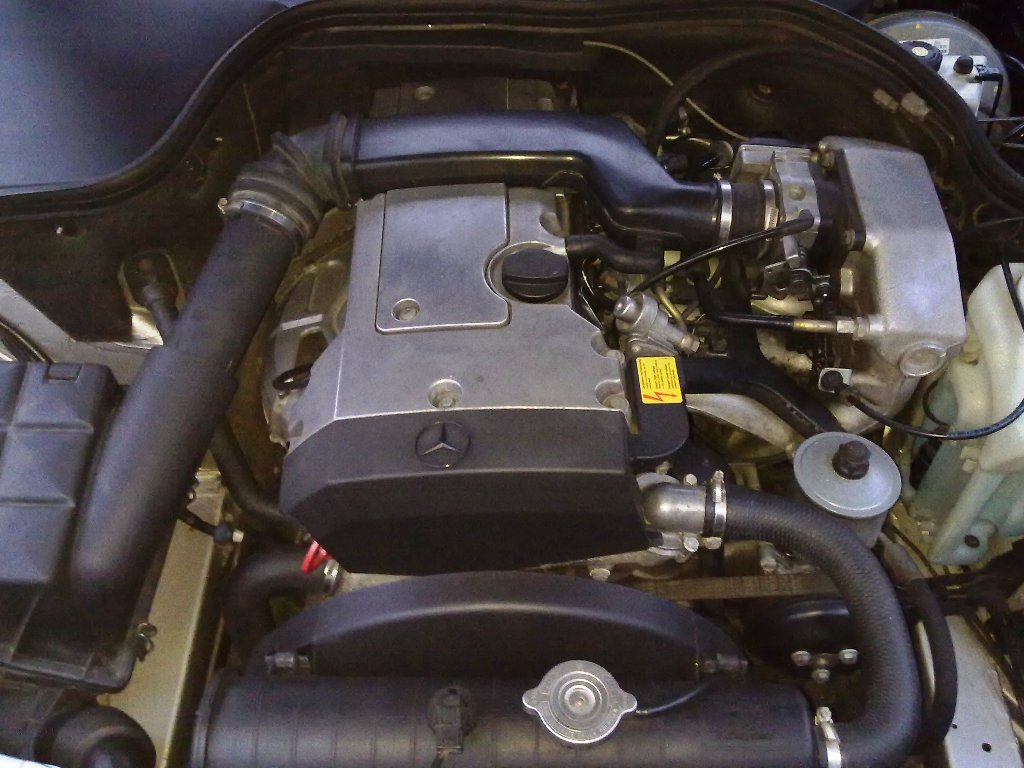

Overview
- Manufacturer: Mercedes-Benz
- Production: 1992–2003

Layout
- Configuration: Straight-4
- Displacement: 1.8 L (1,799 cc); 2.0 L (1,998 cc); 2.2 L (2,199 cc); 2.3 L (2,295 cc)
- Cylinder bore: 85.3 mm (3.358 in); 89.9 mm (3.539 in); 90.9 mm (3.579 in)
- Piston stroke: 78.7 mm (3.098 in); 86.6 mm (3.409 in); 88.4 mm (3.480 in)
- Cylinder block material: Cast iron
- Cylinder head material: Aluminum alloy
- Valvetrain: DOHC 4 valves per cylinder
- Compression ratio: 9.6:1, 10.0:1, 10.4:1, 10.6:1

Combustion
- Supercharger: In some versions
- Fuel system: Fuel injection
- Management: Siemens PEC/PMS (Pressure Engine Control) (1994-1996 W202 C180 C200, W124 E200) Bosch HFM (Hot Film Management) (1994-1996 W202 C220, W124 E220, 1996-2000 all 4cyl petrol W202, W210
- Fuel type: Gasoline
- Cooling system: Water cooled

Output
- Power output: 90–145 kW (122–197 PS; 121–194 hp)
- Torque output: 170–280 N⋅m (125–207 lb⋅ft)

Chronology
- Predecessor: Mercedes-Benz M102 engine
- Successor: Mercedes-Benz M271 engine

The M111 family is a straight-four automobile engine from Mercedes-Benz, produced from 1992 to 2003. Using the same cylinder block as the SOHC M102, it featured Dual-Overhead camshaft 4 valve per cylinder layout, pioneered by the Cosworth. In addition it brought variable valve timing and modern engine management fuel injection/ignition in place of the mechanical KE-Jetronic. Introduced in summer 1992 for the Mercedes-Benz W124, it would become the primary engine for the 1990s and into the early 2000s.

Originally available in aspirated form, it would introduce Supercharger (German: Kompressor) performance feature in 1996. In addition to powering Mercedes-Benz passenger and commercial vehicles, it would be used in several Volkswagen and Ssangyoung models.

As a member of the modular family of engines, similar refinements would take place in the six cylinder M104 petrol and 4-5-6 cylinder OM604-605-606 diesel engines with large interchangeability of parts and components.

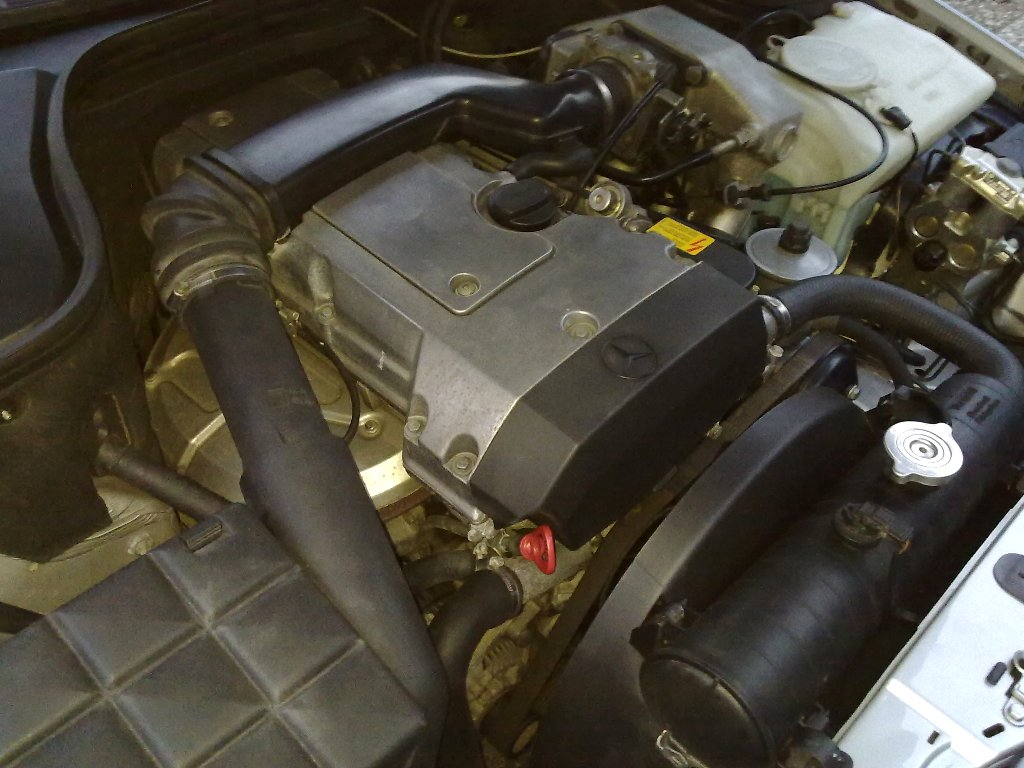
M111 E18 engine ('94 C 180)

== E18 ==
=== M111.920 / M111.921 ===
The M111.920 is a 1,799 cc (109.8 cu in) 16 valve engine with bore and stroke of 85.3 mm × 78.7 mm (3.358 in × 3.098 in). It produces 90 kW (122 PS; 121 hp) of power at 5500 rpm and 170 N⋅m (125 lb⋅ft) at 4200 rpm. Starting with 1996 it has a variant called the M111.921 which has a MAF (Mass Air Flow)-sensor instead of MAP-sensor on the first one, and using ECU instead of PMS.

Applications:

- 1993–2000 C 180 (W202)

== E20 ==
=== M111.940 ===
The M111.940 is a 1,998 cc (121.9 cu in) 16-valve engine with bore and stroke of 89.9 mm × 78.7 mm (3.539 in × 3.098 in) and compression ratio of 9.6:1. It produces 100 kW (136 PS; 134 hp) of power and 190 N⋅m (140 lb⋅ft) of torque.

Applications:

- 1992–1997 E 200 (W124)

Unlike the M 102, the M 103, and early M 104 series engines, the engine did not use mechanical fuel injection but the Siemens PEC/PMS (Pressure Engine Control) management system, which integrates fuel and spark management.

It is a speed-density type of system, as mixture formation is dependent on RPM, TPS angle, and manifold pressure (MAP).

Injectors work in pairs (idle, part load), or altogether (full-load).

It uses 2 ignition coils and no ignition distributor. Cylinders are fired in pairs (dual fire) – 1 and 4 together, and 2 and 3 together. The crankshaft position sensor is sensing the movement of two radially opposed position plates on the flywheel, one of which is magnetized, and the other is not. Thus, the engine management has precise information which group of cylinders to fire, and which group of injectors to spray.

=== M111.941 / M111.942 / M111.945 / M111.946 ===
Similar to the M111.940 engine, used in the following years. It produces 100 kW (136 PS; 134 hp) of power and 190 N⋅m (140 lb⋅ft) of torque.

Applications:

M111.941:

- 1993–1996 C 200 (W202)

M111.942:

- 1995–1999 E 200 (W210)

M111.945:

- 1996–2000 C 200 (W202)
- 1997–2000 CLK 200 (C208)
- 1996–2000 E 200 (W210)

M111.946:

- 1996–2000 SLK 200 (R170)

This motor never had PMS. Early models 1995 to 1997 has a HFM-motronic, hot-film type air/fuel metering device, and 1997 to 2002 with ME2.1 motronic. The later system also has a magnet on the intake camshaft, and gives signal to ECU, to assist the motor in producing more torque at low revs. The early motor didn't have any camshaft position sensor, so wiring was much different.

The only problem experienced with this M111 excellent reliability motor is the originally installed Victor Reinz headgasket, which eventually tore apart by age, and made the top lose coolant on the side. Other than that, only some year models, had bad insulation on the engine wiring, that needed all the wiring to be replaced.

=== M111.948 / M111.950 ===
The power is 95 kW (129 PS; 127 hp), torque 180 N⋅m (133 lb⋅ft) at 4200 rpm. Later model had 186 N⋅m (137 lb⋅ft) of torque at 3600-4500 rpm.

Applications:

- M111.948: 1996–1999 V 200 (W638)
- M111.950: 1999–2003 V 200 (W638)

=== M111.951 / M111.952 ===
EVO engine (M 111 E 20 EVO). Naturally aspirated, compression ratio is 10.6:1. The power is 95 kW (129 PS; 127 hp) at 5300 rpm, torque - 190 N⋅m (140 lb⋅ft) at 4000 rpm. Improvement includes reinforced cylinder block, new cylinder head, individual coil-on-plug ignition with new iridium-tipped spark plugs for 100,000 km (62,000 mi) replacement intervals, connecting rods and pistons for higher compression ratio, fuel injection now Siemens SIM4, EuroIV emissions compliant, dual oxygen sensors.

Applications:

- 2000–2002 C 180 (W203)
- 2000–2002 C 180 SportCoupé (CL203)
- 2000–2003 V 200/Vito 113

A M111.952 variant of this engine was fitted to the final model year S202 (estate version) where it replaced the older 1.8l 122hp version for MY 2001. 2295 built from 06.2000 until 01.2001.

Applications:

- 2000–2001 C 180 (S202)

== E20 ML ==
=== M111.943 / M111.944 / M111.947 ===
The M111.943 and M111.944 are a 1,998 cc (121.9 cu in) 16-valve engines utilizing a supercharger similar to the 2.3L M111.973 engine. It produces 141 kW (192 PS; 189 hp) of power and 270 N⋅m (199 lb⋅ft) of torque. This engine was built especially to be exported to Italy, The Netherlands, Portugal and Greece for tax reasons. The 'executive cars' tax limit was based in engine's capacity bigger than 2000 cc, so Mercedes in order to hit these markets made a mixture of the M111.940 with the supercharger of M111.973 for high performance at low engine capacity. Early, 1995 iteration developed only 132 kW (179 PS; 177 hp).

Applications:

M111.943:

- 1996–2000 SLK 200 Kompressor (R170)

M111.944:

- 1995–2000 C 200 Kompressor (W202)
- 1997–2000 CLK 200 Kompressor (C208)

M111.947:

- 1997–2000 E 200 Kompressor (W210)

=== M111.955 / M111.956 / M111.957 / M111.958 ===
M 111 E 20 ML EVO. This is a 2.0L Kompressor engine utilizing a supercharger (Eaton M45, black pulley) similar to the 2.3L M111.974 engine, but with a lower power output of 120 kW (163 PS; 161 hp) and torque of 230 N⋅m (170 lb⋅ft) @ 2500 rpm. EVO engine replaced the Eaton M62 supercharger with Eaton M45 unit. This engine was built for export to Italy, The Netherlands, Portugal, Turkey and Greece for tax reasons.

Applications:

M111.955:

- 2000–2002 C 200 Kompressor (W203)
- 2000–2002 C 200 Kompressor SportCoupé (CL203)

M111.956:

- 2000–2003 CLK 200 Kompressor (C208)
- 2000–2001 C 200 Kompressor (S202)

M111.957:

- 2000–2003 E 200 Kompressor (W210)

M111.958:

- 2000–2004 SLK 200 Kompressor (R170)

== E22 ==
=== M111.960 / M111.961 ===
The M111.960 is a 2,199 cc (134.2 cu in) 16-valve engine with bore and stroke of 89.9 mm × 86.6 mm (3.539 in × 3.409 in) and compression ratio of 10:1. It produces 110 kW (150 PS; 148 hp) of power and 210 N⋅m (155 lb⋅ft) of torque.

Applications:

- M111.960: 1992–1997 E 220 (W124)
- M111.961: 1993–1996 C 220 (W202)

== E23 ==
=== M111.970 / M111.974 / M111.978 ===
The M111.970 is a 2,295 cc (140.0 cu in) 16-valve engine with bore and stroke of 90.9 mm × 88.4 mm (3.58 in × 3.48 in) and compression ratio of 10.4:1. It produces 110 kW (150 PS; 148 hp) or 90 kW (122 PS; 120 hp) of power and 220 N⋅m (162 lb⋅ft) or 180 N·m (132 lb·ft) of torque.

Applications:

- M111.970: 1995–1998 E 230 (W210)
- M111.974: 1996–1998 C 230 (W202)
- M111.978: 1996–1999 V 230/Vito 114
- М111.977: 1998-2000 ML 230 (W163)
- 1996–2004 MB100 2.3
- 2005–2013 Ssangyong Actyon 4 cylinder.
- 1997–2014 Ssangyong Chairman 4 cylinder.
- 1996–2004 Ssangyong Istana / Daewoo Istana 4 cylinder.
- 1993–2003 Ssangyong Korando 4 cylinder.
- 2005–2014 Ssangyong Kyron 4 cylinder.
- 1993–2003 Ssangyong Musso 4 cylinder.
- 2001–2012 Ssangyong Rexton 4 cylinder.

=== M111.979 / M111.980 / M111.984 ===
The M111.979 is a 2,295 cc (140.0 cu in) 16-valve engine with bore and stroke of 90.9 mm × 88.4 mm (3.579 in × 3.480 in) and compression ratio of 8.8:1. It produces 105 kW (143 PS) @5000 rpm and a maximum torque of 210 N⋅m (155 lb⋅ft) @4000 rpm.

Applications:

M111.979:

- 1995–2006 Sprinter 214 / 314 / 414

M111.980:

- 1999–2003 V 230

M111.984:

- 1995–2006 Sprinter 214 / 314 / 414
- 1996–2001 Volkswagen LT 2.3
- 1996–1998 Ssangyong Musso 2.3

=== M111.977 ===
The M111.977 is a 2,295 cc (140.0 cu in) engine with compression ratio of 10.4:1. It produces 110 kW (150 PS) and a maximum torque of 220 N⋅m (162 lb⋅ft).

Applications:

- 1998–2000 ML 230 (W163)

== E23 ML ==
=== M111.973 / M111.975 ===
Similar to the 2.3L M111.970 engine, except the usage of a supercharger (kompressor), boosting its power output to 142 kW (193 PS; 190 hp)and 280 N⋅m (207 lb⋅ft) of torque.

Applications:

M111.973:

- 1996–2000 SLK 230 Kompressor (R170)
- 1997–2000 C 230 Kompressor (S202)

M111.975:

- 1997–2000 CLK 230 Kompressor (C208)
- 1996–2000 C 230 Kompressor (W202)

=== M111.981 / M111.982 / M111.983 ===
Similar to the 2.3L M111.974 engine, except supercharged. M 111 E 23 ML EVO. Power 145 kW (197 PS; 194 hp).

Applications:

- M111.981: 2001–2002 C 230 Kompressor SportCoupé (CL203)
- M111.982: 2000–2002 CLK 230 Kompressor (C208)
- M111.983: 2000–2004 SLK 230 Kompressor (R170)

== See also ==
- List of Mercedes-Benz engines
