= Mercedes-Benz M112 engine =

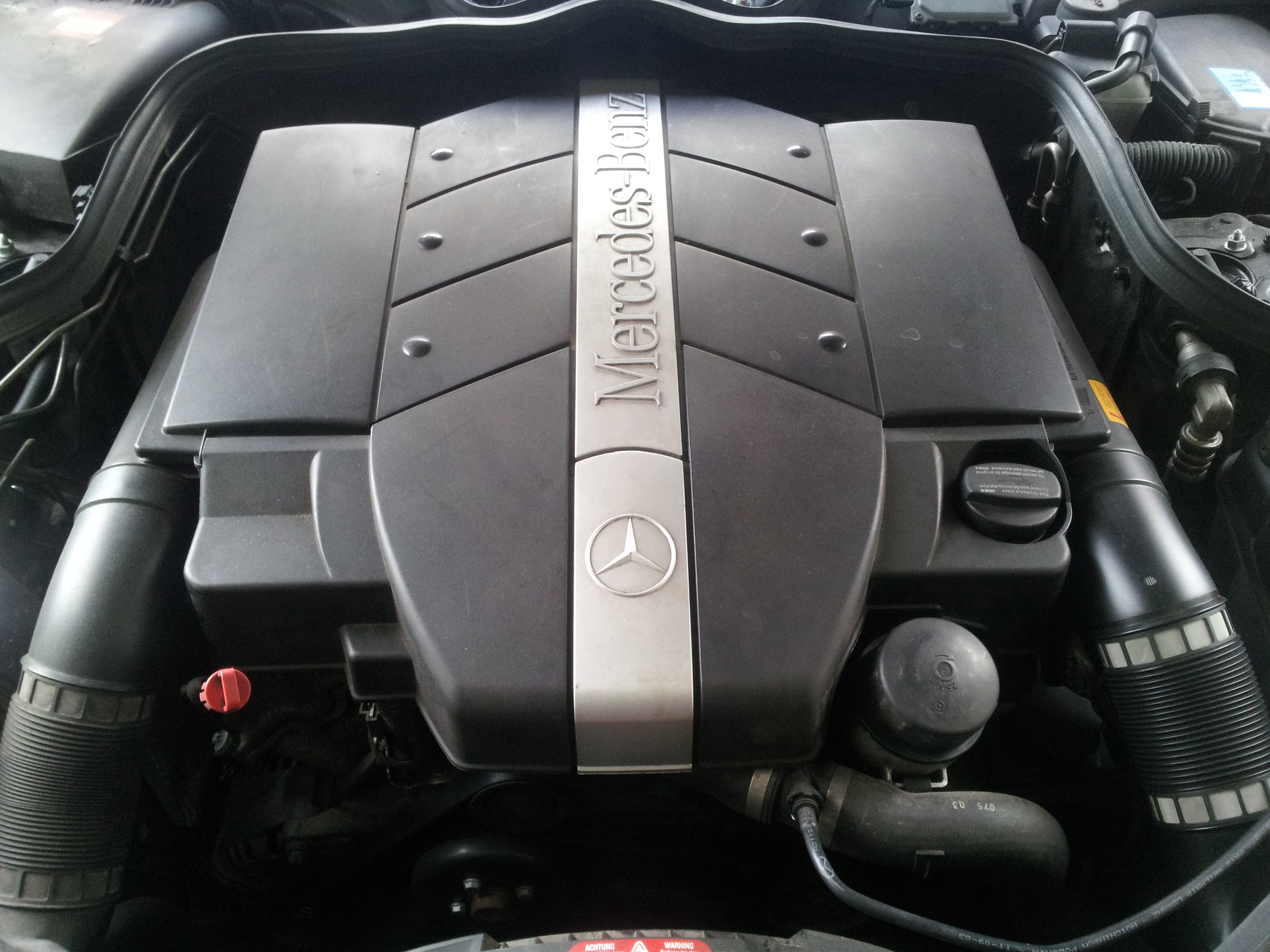

Overview
- Manufacturer: Mercedes-Benz
- Production: 1996–2015

Layout
- Configuration: 90° V6
- Displacement: 2.4 L (2,398 cc); 2.6 L (2,597 cc); 2.8 L (2,799 cc); 3.2 L (3,199 cc); 3.7 L (3,724 cc)
- Cylinder bore: 83.2 mm (3.28 in); 89.9 mm (3.54 in); 97 mm (3.82 in)
- Piston stroke: 68.2 mm (2.69 in); 73.5 mm (2.89 in); 84 mm (3.31 in)
- Cylinder block material: Aluminum
- Cylinder head material: Aluminum
- Valvetrain: SOHC 3 valves x cyl.

RPM range
- Max. engine speed: 6,000-6,400 rpm

Combustion
- Supercharger: IHI Twin-screw type (in some versions)
- Fuel system: Sequential fuel injection
- Fuel type: Gasoline
- Cooling system: Water cooled

Output
- Power output: 125–260 kW (170–354 PS; 168–349 bhp)
- Torque output: 225–450 N⋅m (166–332 lb⋅ft)

Chronology
- Predecessor: Mercedes-Benz M104 (inline-6)
- Successor: Mercedes-Benz M272

The Mercedes-Benz M112 engine is a gasoline-fueled, 4-stroke, spark-ignition, internal-combustion automobile piston V6 engine family used in the 2000s. Introduced in 1996, it was the first gasoline V6 engine ever built by Mercedes. A short time later the related M113 V8 was introduced.

All are built in Bad Cannstatt, Germany, except the supercharged C 32 AMG and SLK 32 AMG, assembled in Affalterbach, Germany.

All M112 engines have silicon/aluminum (Alusil) engine blocks with a 90° vee angle. The aluminum SOHC cylinder heads have 3 valves per cylinder. All use sequential fuel injection with two spark plugs per cylinder. All have forged steel connecting rods, a one-piece cast camshaft, iron-coated aluminum pistons and a magnesium intake manifold. To deal with the vibration problems of a 90 degree V6, a balancer shaft was installed in the engine block between the cylinder banks. This essentially eliminated first and second order vibration problems (see engine balance). A dual-length Variable Length Intake Manifold is fitted to optimise engine flexibility.

These engines, along with the V8 (M113) variant, are often regarded as being the most reliable Mercedes-Benz engines of their era.

== E24 ==
The E24 is a 2.4 L (2,398 cc) version. Bore and stroke is 83.2 mm × 73.5 mm (3.28 in × 2.89 in). The engine produces 168 bhp (125 kW; 170 PS) at 5900 rpm and 225 N⋅m (166 lb⋅ft) of torque between 3000 and 5500 rpm. The compression ratio is 10.0:1.

Applications:

- M112.910: 1996–2000 C 240 (W202)
- M112.911: 1996–2000 E 240 (W210)

== E26 ==
The E26 is a 2.6 L (2,597 cc) version. Bore and stroke is 89.9 mm × 68.2 mm (3.54 in × 2.69 in). Output is 125 kW (170 PS; 168 bhp) ECE at 5,500 rpm 240 N⋅m (177 lb⋅ft) of torque at 4,500 rpm in all applications except in the 2003-2005 W211 E-Class where power rose to 130 kW (177 PS; 174 bhp). The compression ratio is raised to 10.5:1.

Applications:

M112.912:

- 2000–2005 C 240 (W203)
- 2001–2005 CLK 240 (C209)

M112.914:

- 1999–2002 E 240 (W210)

M112.916:

- 2002–2005 C 240 4MATIC (W203)

M112.917:

- 2001–2005 E 240 (W211)

M112.950:

- 2000–2001 C 240 (S202)

== E28 ==
The E28 is a 2.8 L (2,799 cc) version. Bore and stroke is 89.9 mm × 73.5 mm (3.54 in × 2.89 in). It produces 201 bhp (150 kW; 204 PS) (W220 S280, R129 SL280 and W210 E280) or 194 bhp (145 kW; 197 PS) (W202 C280) at 5,700 rpm and 270 N⋅m (199 lb⋅ft) of torque between 3,000 and 5,000 rpm. The compression ratio is 10.0:1.

Applications:

- M112.920: 1996–2000 C 280 (W202)
- M112.921: 1996–2002 E 280 (W210)
- M112.922: 1997–2005 S 280 (W220)
- M112.923: 1997–2001 SL 280 (R129)

== E32 ==
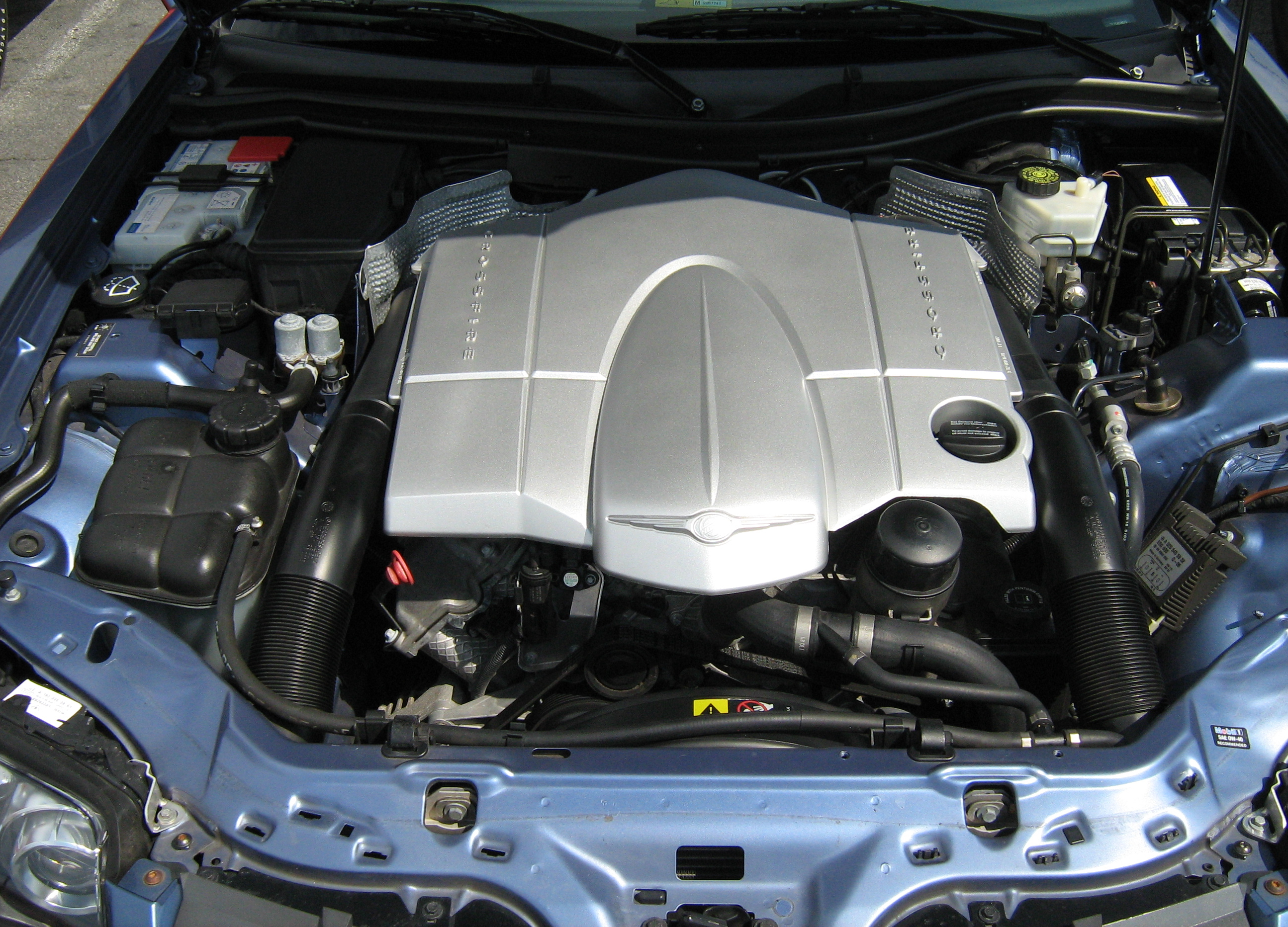
Chrysler Crossfire view of engine compartment

The E32 is a 3.2 L (3,199 cc) version. Bore remains at 89.9 mm (3.54 in) but the engine is stroked to 84 mm (3.31 in). Output is 215–224 bhp ECE at 5,700 rpm (depending on model) with 315 N⋅m (232 lb⋅ft) of torque at 3,000–4,800 rpm. The compression ratio is 10.0:1. It has fracture-split forged steel connecting rods.

Applications:

- M112.940: 1996–2002 CLK 320 (C208)
- M112.941: 1998–2003 E 320 (W210)
- M112.942: 1998–2003 ML 320 (W163)
- M112.943: 1998–2001 SL 320 (R129)
- M112.944: 1998–2002 S 320 (W220)
- M112.945: 1997–2006 G 320 (W463)
- M112.946: 2000–2005 C 320 (W203) & C 320 SportCoupé (CL203)
- M112.947: 2000–2003 SLK 320 (R170)
- M112.949: 2002–2005 E 320 (W211)
- M112.951: 2003–2015 Viano 3.0/Vito 119 (W639)
- M112.953: 2002–2005 C 320 4MATIC (W203)
- M112.954: 2003–2004 E 320 4MATIC (W211)
- M112.955: 2002–2005 CLK 320 (C209)
- 2004–2008 Chrysler Crossfire

== E32 ML ==
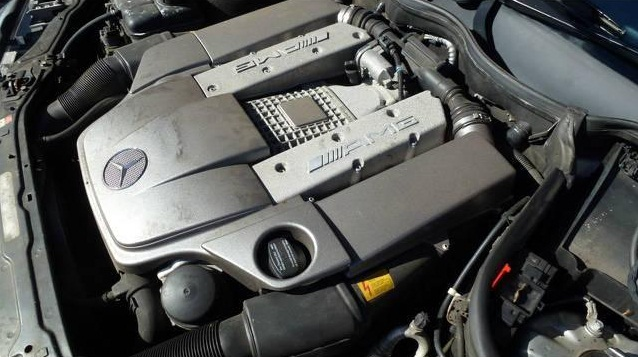
Supercharged C 32 AMG/SLK 32 AMG engine

The E32 Kompressor is a special version of the 3.2 L (3,199 cc), fitted with a helical Twin-screw type supercharger. The supercharger was developed in conjunction with IHI and features Teflon-coated rotors producing overall boost of 14.5 psi (1.00 bar) with the factory 74mm clutch-activated pulley. A water-to-air intercooler made by Garrett is fitted beneath the supercharger inside the V, with a 0.8L Heat-Exchanger mounted under the bumper run by an electric water pump. Output is 260 kW (354 PS; 349 bhp) ECE at 6,100 rpm with 450 N⋅m (332 lb⋅ft) of torque at 3,000-4,600 rpm. The compression ratio is 9.0:1.

Applications:

- M112.960: 2000–2004 SLK 32 AMG (R170)
- M112.961: 2000–2004 C 32 AMG (W203) & C 32 AMG SportCoupé (CL203)
- 2002 A 32K AMG
- 2005–2006 Chrysler Crossfire SRT-6

== E37 ==
The E37 is a 3.7 L (3,724 cc) version. It retains the stroke of the E32 but is bored to 97 mm (3.82 in). Output is 173 to 180 kW (235 to 245 PS; 232 to 241 bhp) ECE at 5,750 rpm with 344 N⋅m (254 lb⋅ft) of torque at 3,000-4,500 rpm. The compression ratio is 10.0:1.

Applications:

- M112.970: 2001–2004 ML 350 (W163)
- M112.972: 2002–2005 S 350 (W220)
- M112.975: 2002–2005 S 350 4MATIC (W220)
- M112.973: 2001–2006 SL 350 (R230)
- 2004–2008 V 350

== See also ==
- List of Mercedes-Benz engines
