= Mercedes-Benz CLK-Class (C208) =

Mercedes-Benz CLK-Class (C208/A208)
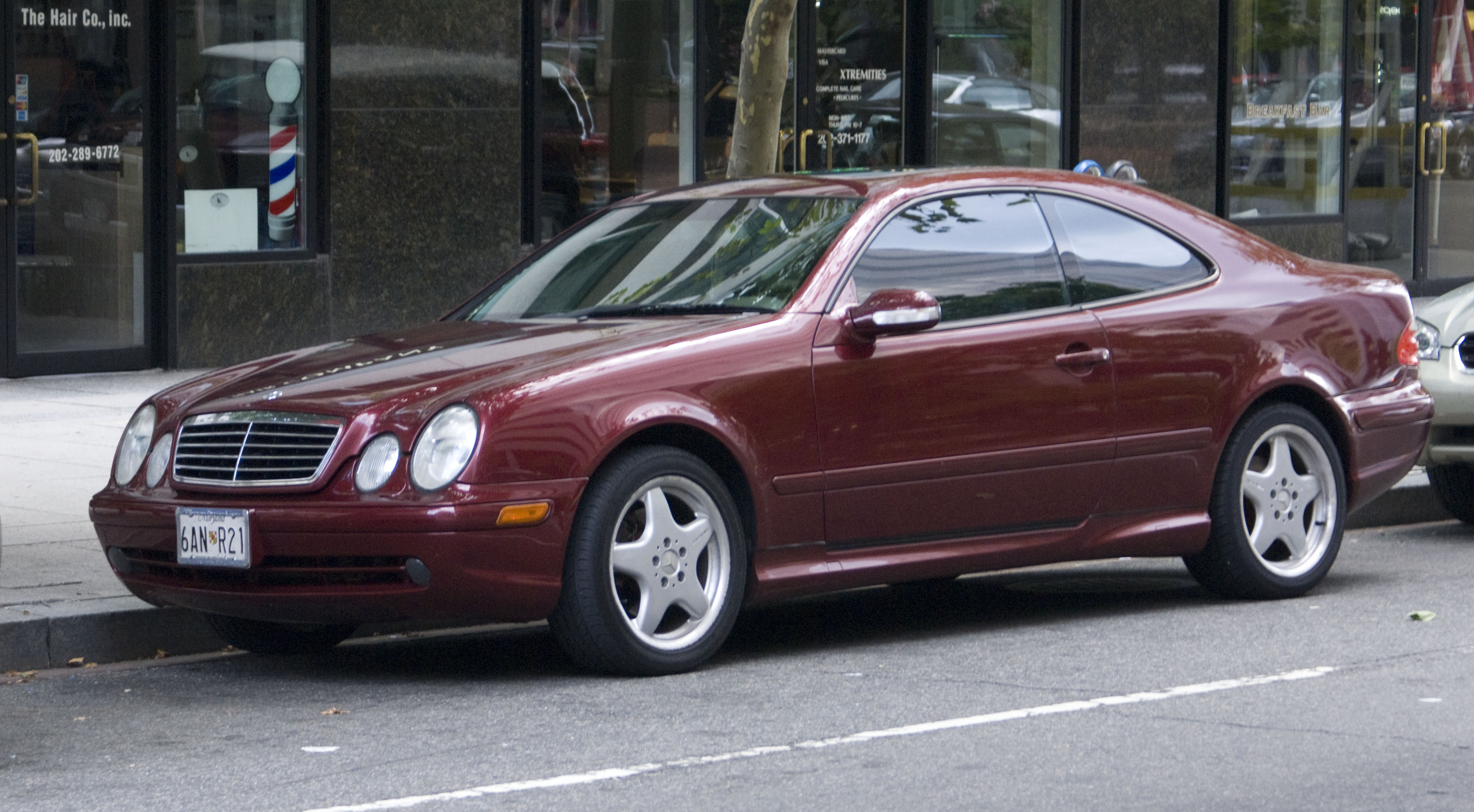
- Mercedes-Benz CLK 430 (C208)

Overview
- Manufacturer: Daimler-Benz (1996–1998); DaimlerChrysler (1998–2003)
- Production: April 1997 – May 2002 (coupé); May 1998 – March 2003 (convertible)
- Assembly: Germany: Bremen; Germany: Osnabrück (Karmann)
- Designer: Bruno Sacco (Head of Design); Michael Fink and Peter Pfeiffer (1993)

Body and chassis
- Class: Grand tourer (S)
- Body style: 2-door coupé; 2-door convertible
- Layout: Front-engine, rear-wheel drive
- Related: Mercedes-Benz C-Class (W202); Mercedes-Benz E-Class (W210)

Powertrain
- Engine: Petrol: 2.0 L M111 I4; 2.0 – 2.3 L M111 supercharged I4; 3.2 L M112 V6; 4.3 – 5.4 L M113 V8
- Transmission: 5-speed manual; 6-speed manual; 6-speed Sequentronic automated manual; 5-speed 5G-Tronic automatic

Dimensions
- Wheelbase: 2,690 mm (105.9 in)
- Length: 4,567 mm (179.8 in)
- Width: 1,722 mm (67.8 in)
- Height: 1,371–1,382 mm (54.0–54.4 in)
- Curb weight: 1,375–1,755 kg (3,031–3,869 lb)

Chronology
- Predecessor: Mercedes-Benz E-Class (C124/A124)
- Successor: Mercedes-Benz CLK-Class (C209/A209)

The 208-series Mercedes-Benz CLK-Class is a two-door grand touring car. It has two variants, a coupé (C208) which was produced by Mercedes-Benz in Bremen from 1997 until 2002, and a convertible (A208) which was assembled by Karmann in Osnabrück from 1998 until 2003. Based upon the 202-series C-Class launched three years prior, the 208 series replaced the two-door variants of the Mercedes-Benz W124 and is the first generation of the CLK-Class. 233,367 coupés and 115,161 convertibles were produced, and it was succeeded by the 209-series CLK-Class in 2002. (Note: For the 2003 model year in North America.)

== History ==
In 1993, Mercedes presented the Coupé Concept at the Geneva Motor Show, a four-seater coupé with a four-headlamp front end similar to the 1995 W210 E-Class. The concept also featured a panoramic tinted-glass roof and a fastback rear, extending even further than on the CLK. The Coupé Concept was equipped with a 5.0-litre V8 powerplant, rated at 320 PS (316 hp; 235 kW) and 470 N⋅m (347 lb⋅ft) of torque. Design patents for the Coupé Concept were filed on 25 February 1993 in Germany and 25 August 1993 in the US.

The CLK introduced a new market niche for Mercedes-Benz. Although the C208 used components from the W210 and its aesthetics also based on it while also maintaining a specification level higher than the W210, it was in fact based on the less expensive C-Class (W202) platform.

Three models were initially available: the CLK 200 powered by a four-cylinder engine, rated at 136 PS (100 kW; 134 hp), the CLK 200 Kompressor powered by a supercharged variant of the four-cylinder engine rated at 192 PS (141 kW; 189 hp) and the CLK 230 Kompressor with the engine rated at 193–197 PS (142–145 kW; 190–194 hp).

The CLK 320 Coupé was introduced in the 1997 model year, powered by a 218 PS (160 kW; 215 hp) 3.2 L V6 engine.

=== 1999 facelift ===
In late 1999 for the 2000 model year, the CLK range underwent a facelift which incorporated, among other changes, a revised instrument cluster with a bigger multifunction display, steering wheel with controls for the multifunction display and radio, a Tiptronic automatic gearbox, revised bumpers, new side skirts and wing mirror-mounted turn signal repeaters. The CLK 430 Cabriolet, powered by a 4.3 L 279 PS (205 kW; 275 hp) M113 V8 engine was also introduced in the same year.

The high-performance CLK 55 AMG, which was introduced first in Europe in October 1999, is powered by the 5.4 L variant of the M113 V8 engine rated at 347 PS (255 kW; 342 hp); the model was manufactured from 1999, in both the coupé and cabriolet body styles.

=== 2000 engine refresh ===
From 2000, Mercedes modified the M111 in-line four engine range, detuning the 200 Kompressor model from 192 to 163 PS as an EVO engine. Some of the improvements included a reinforced cylinder block, a new cylinder head, individual coil-on-plug ignition with new iridium-tipped spark plugs for longer replacement intervals, connecting rods and pistons capable of a higher compression ratio, dual oxygen sensors and replacement of the Eaton M62 supercharger with the Eaton M45 unit.

The 2.0-litre naturally aspirated version of the M111 engine was discontinued, while both Kompressor models received a new six-speed manual transmission as standard, as well as a Sequentronic six-speed manual transmission with sequential gear shift mechanism and an automatic clutch control. The rest of the range retained a five-speed automatic transmission with Touchshift as standard.

Pre-facelift styling

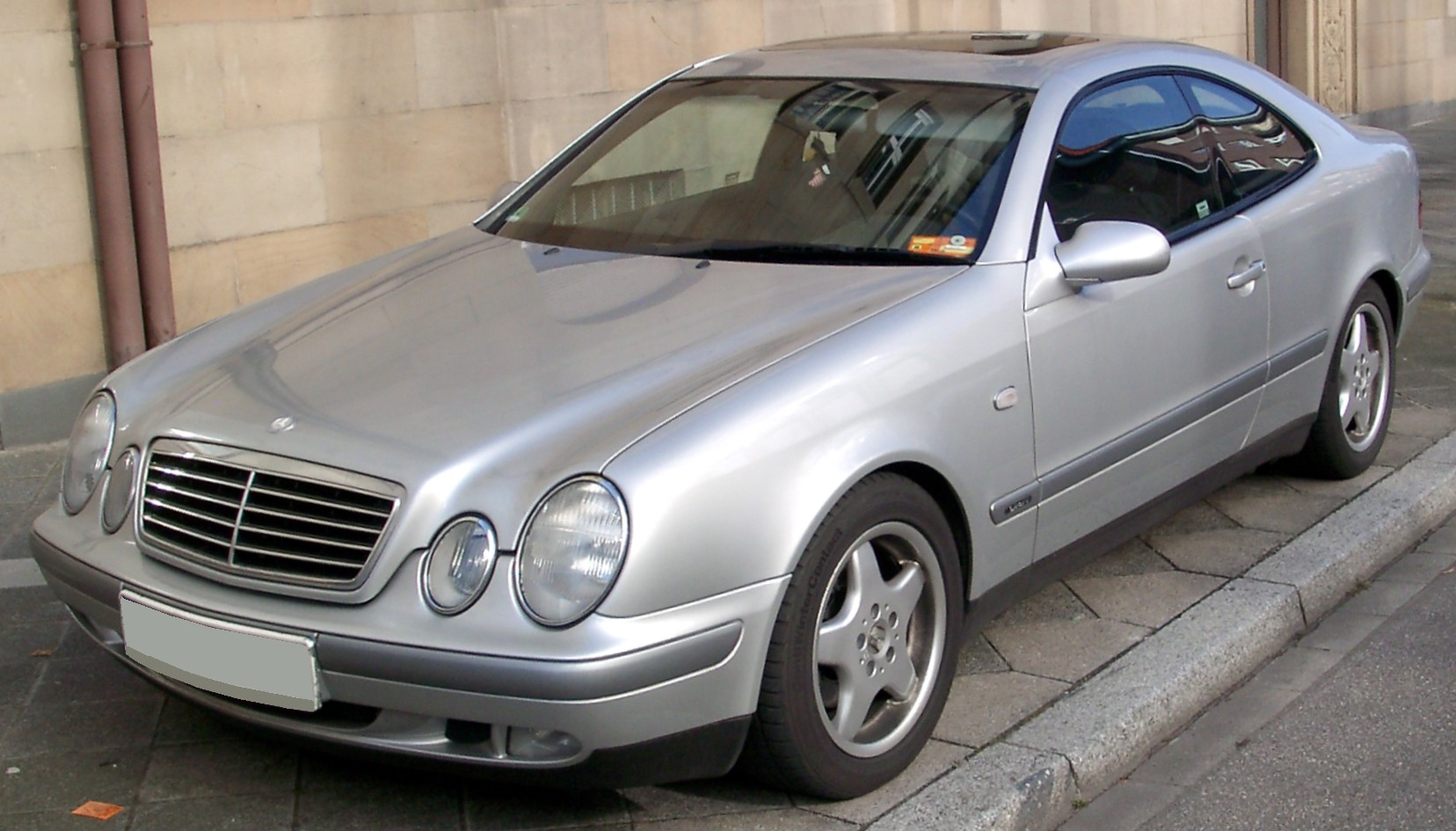
C208 Front view (CLK 320)

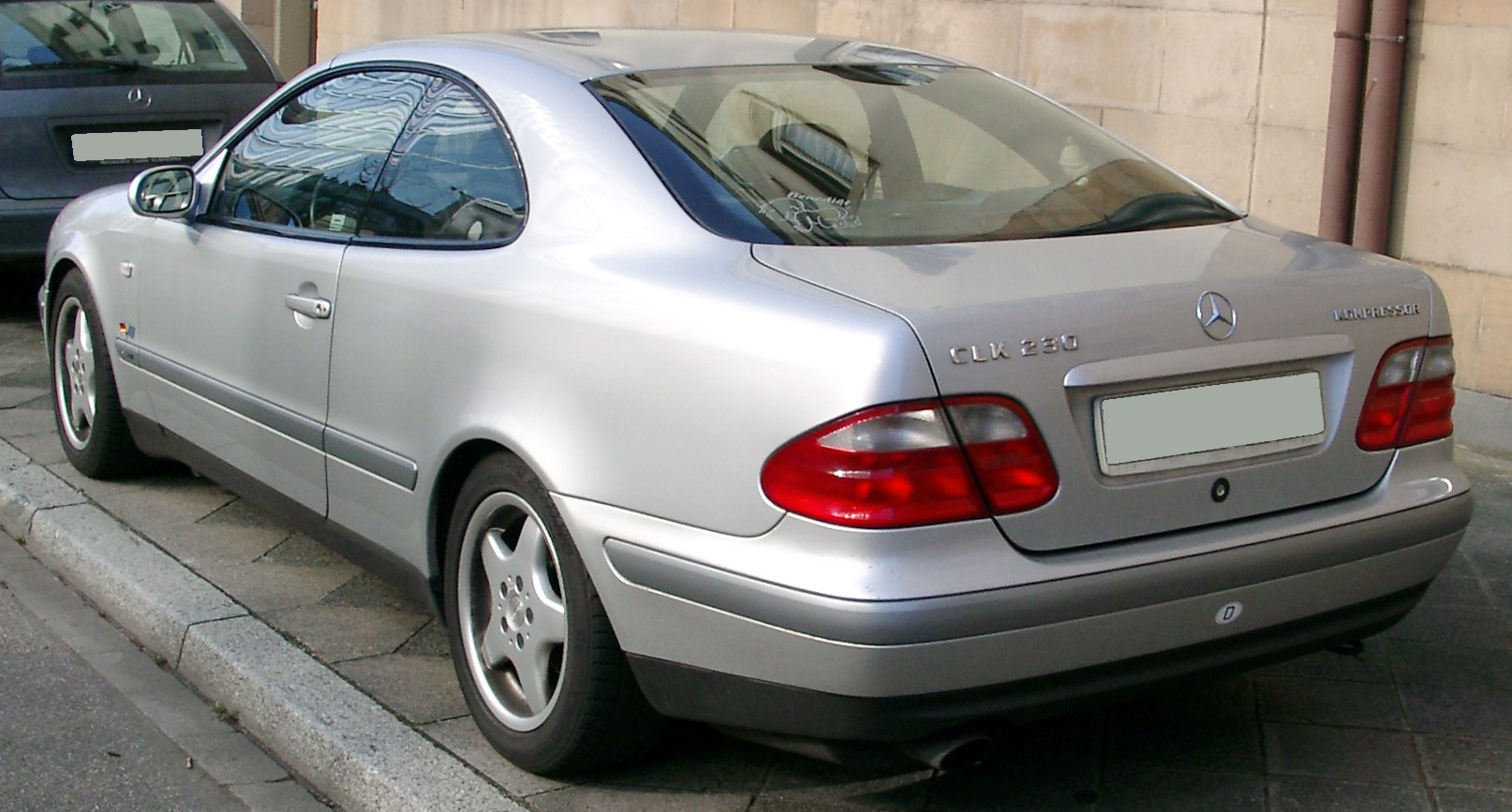
C208 Rear view

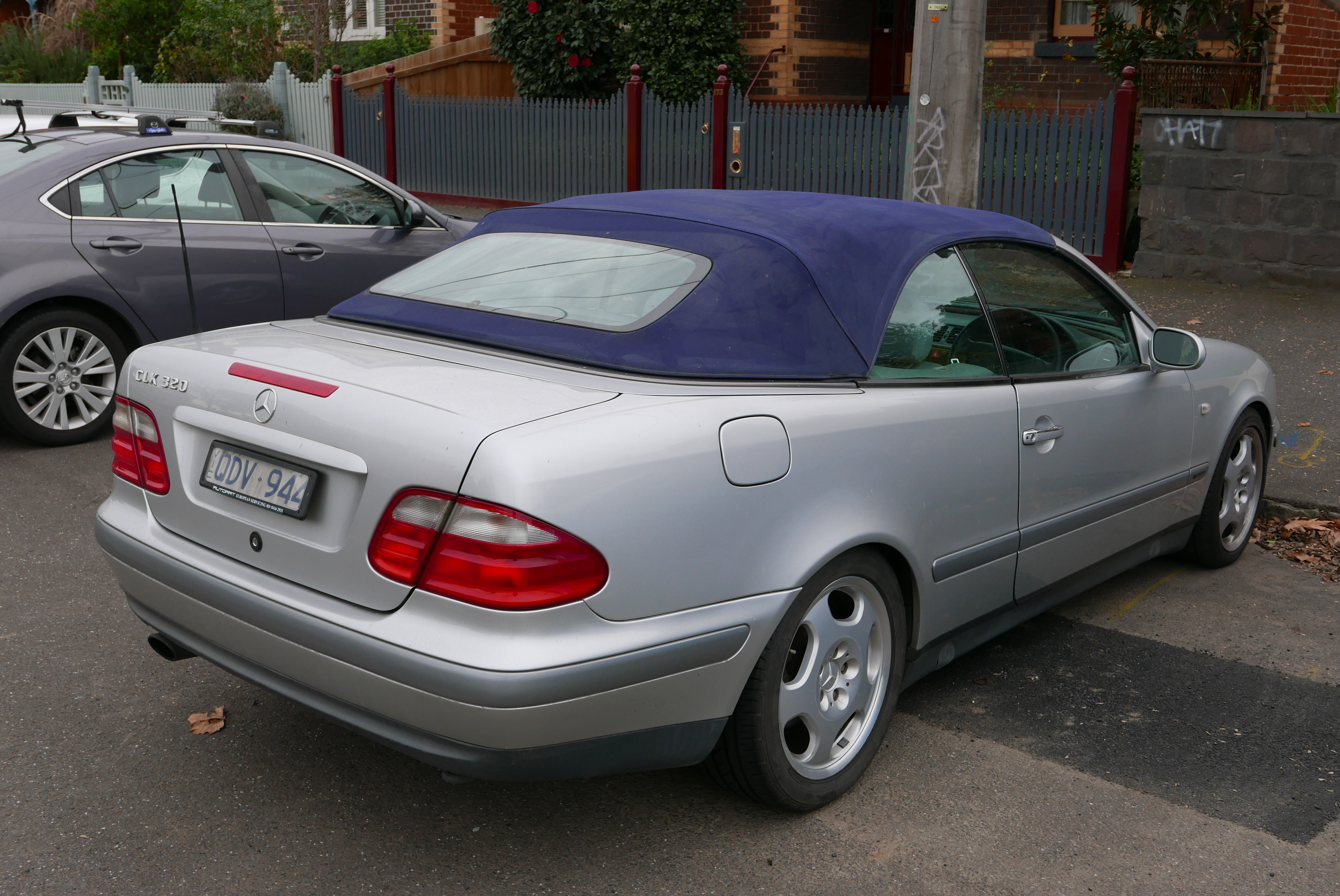
A208 Rear view (CLK 320)

Post-facelift styling

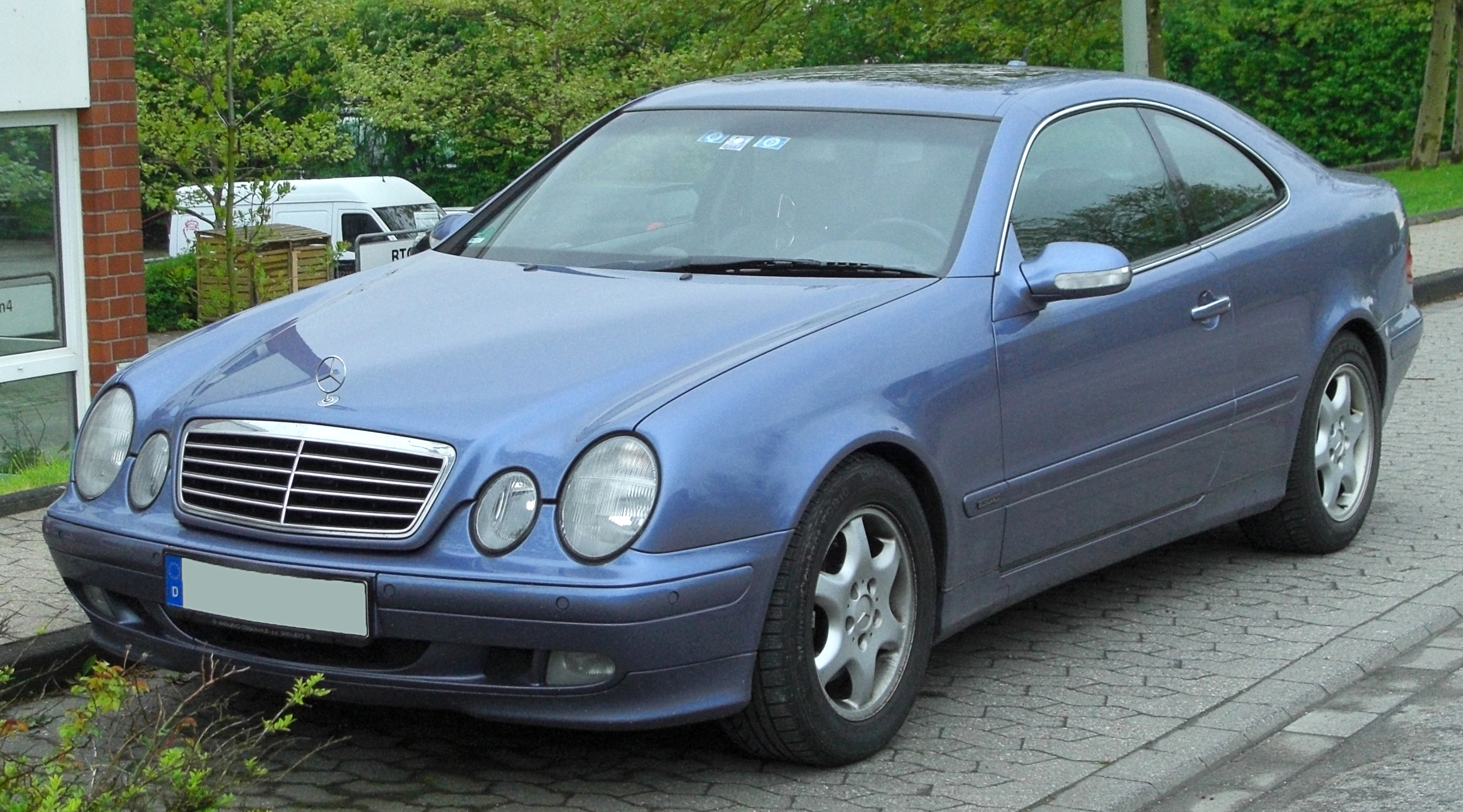
C208 Front view (CLK 200 Elegance)

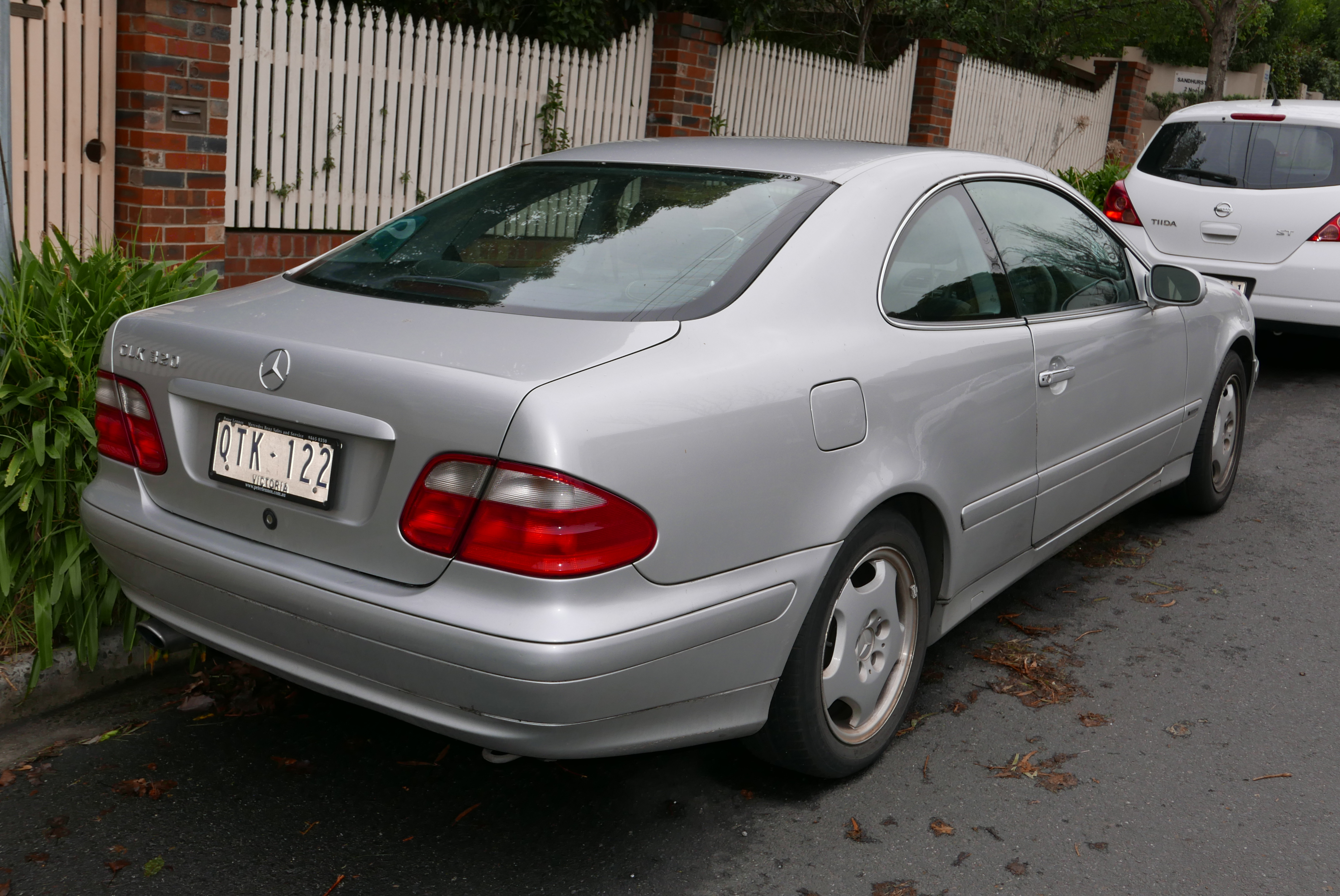
C208 Rear view (CLK 320 Elegance)

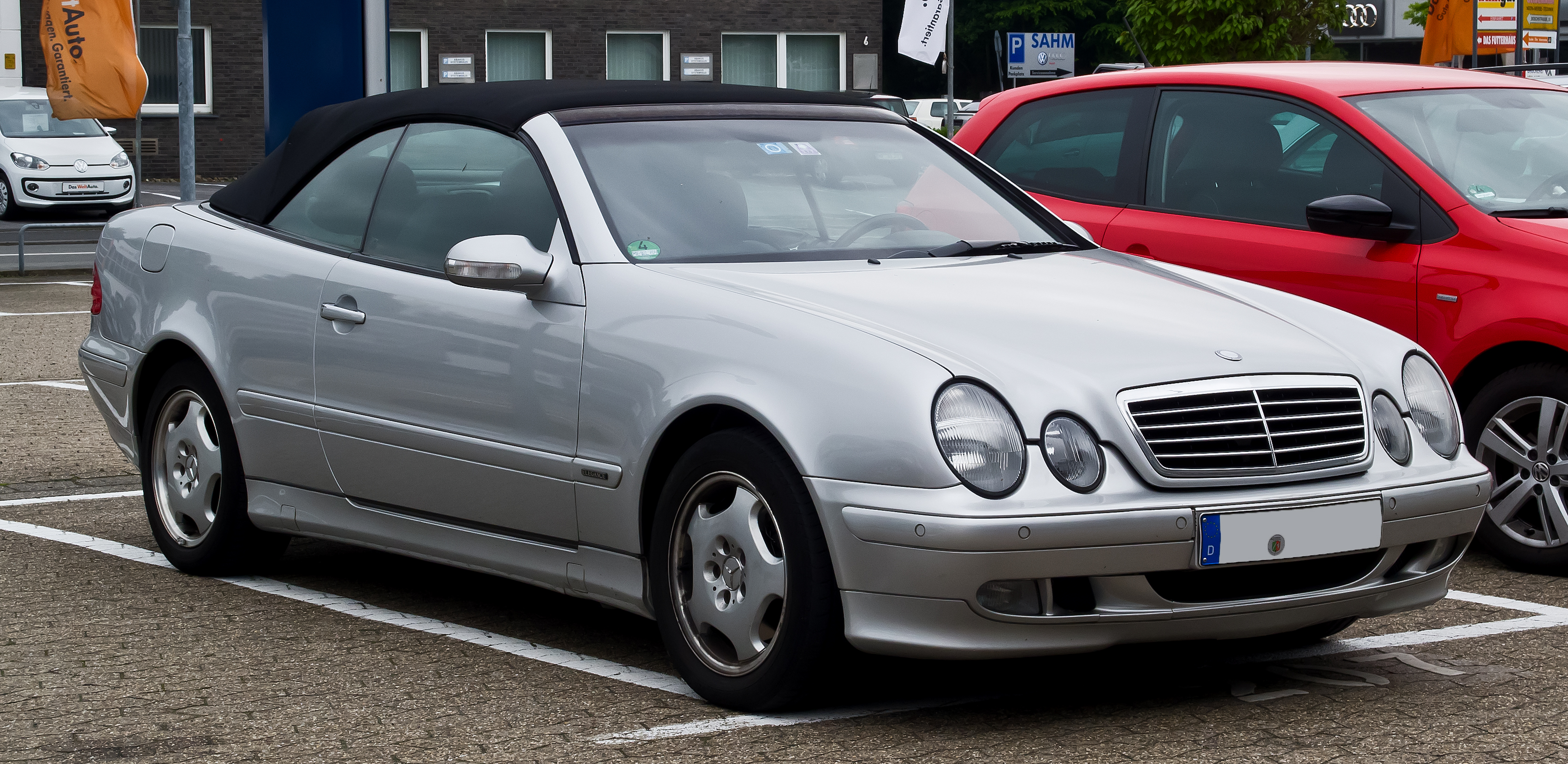
A208 (CLK 200)

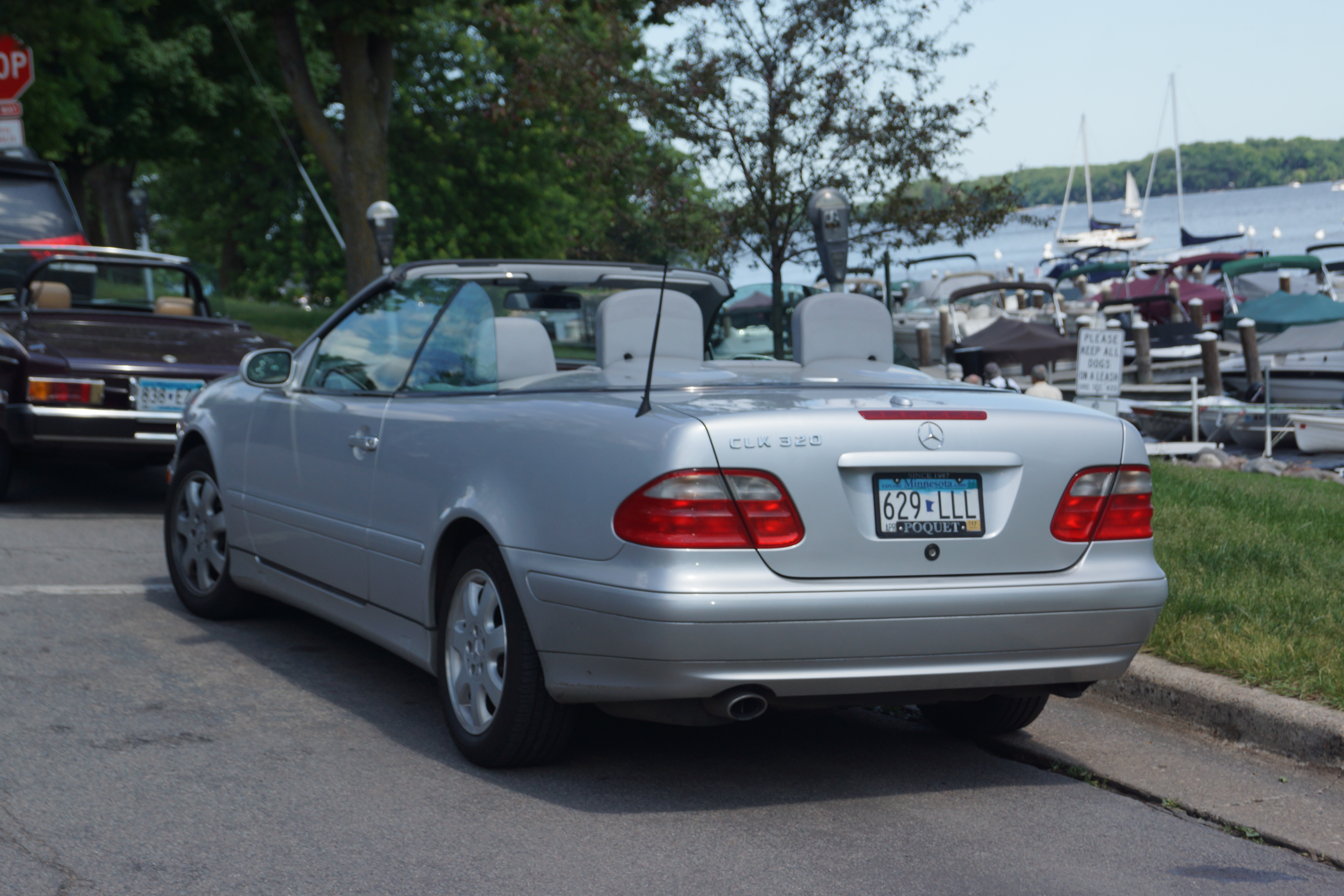
A208 Rear view (CLK 320)

== Engines and performance ==
Model	Engine	Power	Torque	0–100 km/h (0–62 mph)*	Years
CLK 200	M111.945; 2.0 L I4	136 PS (100 kW; 134 hp)	190 N⋅m (140 lbf⋅ft)	10.1 s / 11.5 seconds 12 seconds / 12.5 seconds	1997–2000
CLK 200 Kompressor	M111.944; 2.0 L supercharged I4	192 PS (141 kW; 189 hp)	270 N⋅m (199 lbf⋅ft)	8.4 seconds 9.1 seconds / 9.2 seconds	1997–2000
CLK 200 Kompressor	M111.956; 2.0 L supercharged I4	163 PS (120 kW; 161 hp)	230 N⋅m (170 lbf⋅ft)	9.1 seconds / 9.5 seconds 9.9 seconds / 10.5 seconds	2000–2002
CLK 230 Kompressor	M111.975; 2.3 L supercharged I4	193 PS (142 kW; 190 hp)	280 N⋅m (207 lbf⋅ft)	8.4 seconds 8.8 seconds / 9.1 seconds	1997–2000
CLK 230 Kompressor	M111.982; 2.3 L supercharged I4	197 PS (145 kW; 194 hp)	280 N⋅m (207 lbf⋅ft)	7.9 seconds 8.6 seconds / 8.7 seconds	2000–2002
CLK 320	M112.940 3.2 L V6	218 PS (160 kW; 215 hp)	315 N⋅m (232 lb⋅ft)	7.4 seconds 8.3 seconds	1997–2002
CLK 430	M113.943 4.3 L V8	279 PS (205 kW; 275 hp)	400 N⋅m (295 lbf⋅ft)	6.4 seconds 7.4 seconds	1998–2003
CLK 55 AMG	M113.984 5.4 V8	347 PS (255 kW; 342 hp)	510 N⋅m (376 lbf⋅ft)	5.4 seconds 6.2 seconds	1999–2002

*Acceleration times are for manual/automatic gearbox coupé (above) and for manual/automatic gearbox cabriolet (below).

== Models ==
=== CLK 200 Kompressor ===
The CLK 200 Kompressor model option was an export version for some European markets like Italy, Greece and Portugal for tax reasons as cars with higher than 2.0-litre of engine displacement were subject to higher rates of tax. In 2000 the engine was refreshed and updated but detuned with a new supercharger.

=== CLK 430 ===
In the United States, the CLK 430 could be equipped with a "Sport Package," which gave it the external styling of the more powerful CLK 55 AMG and equipped it with the same wheels and tires as its AMG counterpart (see section "CLK 55 AMG"). This allowed it to reach up to 0.83G's of lateral acceleration, and 66.5 mph (107.0 km/h) on the slalom run.

=== CLK 55 AMG ===
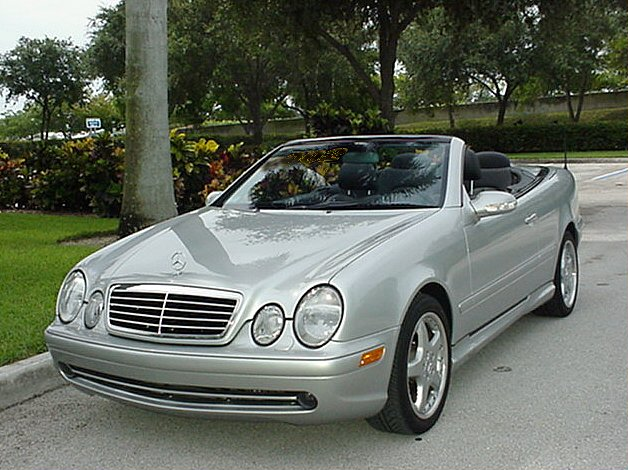
CLK 55 AMG Cabriolet (US)

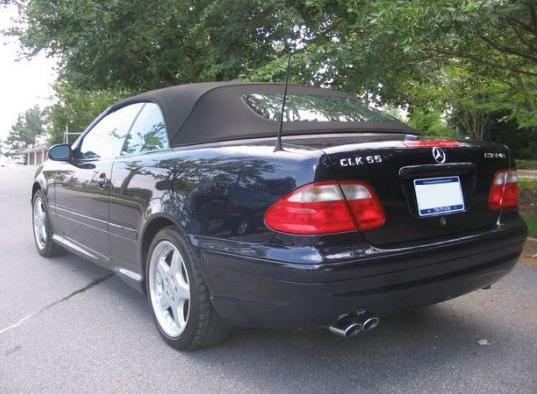
CLK 55 AMG Cabriolet (US)

The CLK 55 AMG is powered by a hand-assembled 5.4-litre V8 engine with a forged steel crankshaft, forged, weight-matched connecting rods and pistons, lightweight AMG-specific chain-driven single overhead camshaft (one cam per cylinder bank) with two intake and one exhaust valves per cylinder, as well as 8 coil packs and 16 spark plugs (two spark plugs per cylinder). Its bore and stroke are 97 mm × 92 mm. The 'dual-resonance' intake manifold with tuned runners helps optimize torque and power output by taking advantage of what Mercedes calls 'resonant frequencies'. The engine has a high compression ratio of 10.5:1. These technologies help the engine produce 347 PS (255 kW; 342 hp) and 376 lb⋅ft (510 N⋅m) of torque.

The five-speed automatic transmission (722.6) is fully adaptive and electronically controlled and is a stronger unit than that of the contemporary CLK 430. Also, a larger four-bolt driveshaft, measuring four inches in diameter, connects to a reinforced rear differential to keep all the extra power under control. The car is equipped with traction control and Electronic Stability Program (ESP) as standard which assist with stability.

The car is based on the standard CLK chassis and provides some special undercarriage components not found on the standard CLK. The four-wheel independent suspension is basically the same as the base CLK models, but AMG fitted higher-rated springs, tighter shock valving, larger diameter anti-roll bars and stiffer suspension bushings. The resulting firmer, more controlled ride is made even tighter by its high-performance ZR-rated low-profile Michelin Pilot Sport tyres. The brakes received enhancements as well. The large four-wheel discs are thicker than the other CLKs, and the rear discs are specially vented to enhance cooling. An anti-lock braking system (ABS) is standard, while Brake Assist applies full braking force in emergency situations for quicker stopping power than a human driver. The wheels are special AMG Monoblock alloy wheels, measuring 7.5" at the front and 8.5" at the rear.

== Special editions ==
=== CLK Master Edition ===
The Master Edition was a 2001 limited edition of the coupé variant of the CLK. It was inspired by the AMG-prepared race car that participated in the Deutsche Tourenwagen Masters championship under the factory D2 AMG-Mercedes team. During the 2000 season, Bernd Schneider won six races and secured both driver's and team's championship. He then repeated this feat a year later in 2001 season.

The model was based on the "Avantgarde" trim with AMG-specific upgrades, including leather sports steering wheel, AMG-badged door sills, gearshift lever and floor mats with the inscription of the edition. On the exterior. front fenders included the "Master Edition" script, 17-inch light-alloy wheels designed by AMG, specific exhaust pipes with an AMG cover and a full AMG bodykit with front and rear aprons as well as the side sill panels, similar to the CLK 55 AMG.

Most engine options were available for the new special model: the 2.0 or 2.3-litre Kompressor, the 3.2-litre V6 and the 4.3 litre V8. Portugal was assigned only 30 units of the edition.

=== CLK Cabriolet Final Edition ===
When the CLK Cabriolet was nearing its replacement by the new C209 generation, Mercedes marketed an end of production limited edition called the Final Edition. Exterior features included optional Cubanite silver gray metallic paint, 17-inch five-spoke light-alloy wheels, chrome trim and "Final Edition" script on the front fenders. The interior was finished with Gray Nappa/Alcantara upholstery, wood and leather steering wheel, decorative elements in burr walnut, chrome details and floor mats with "Final Edition" script. This edition was available as a 200 or 230 Kompressor, 320 V6 or 430 V8.

== Special models ==
=== F1 safety car ===
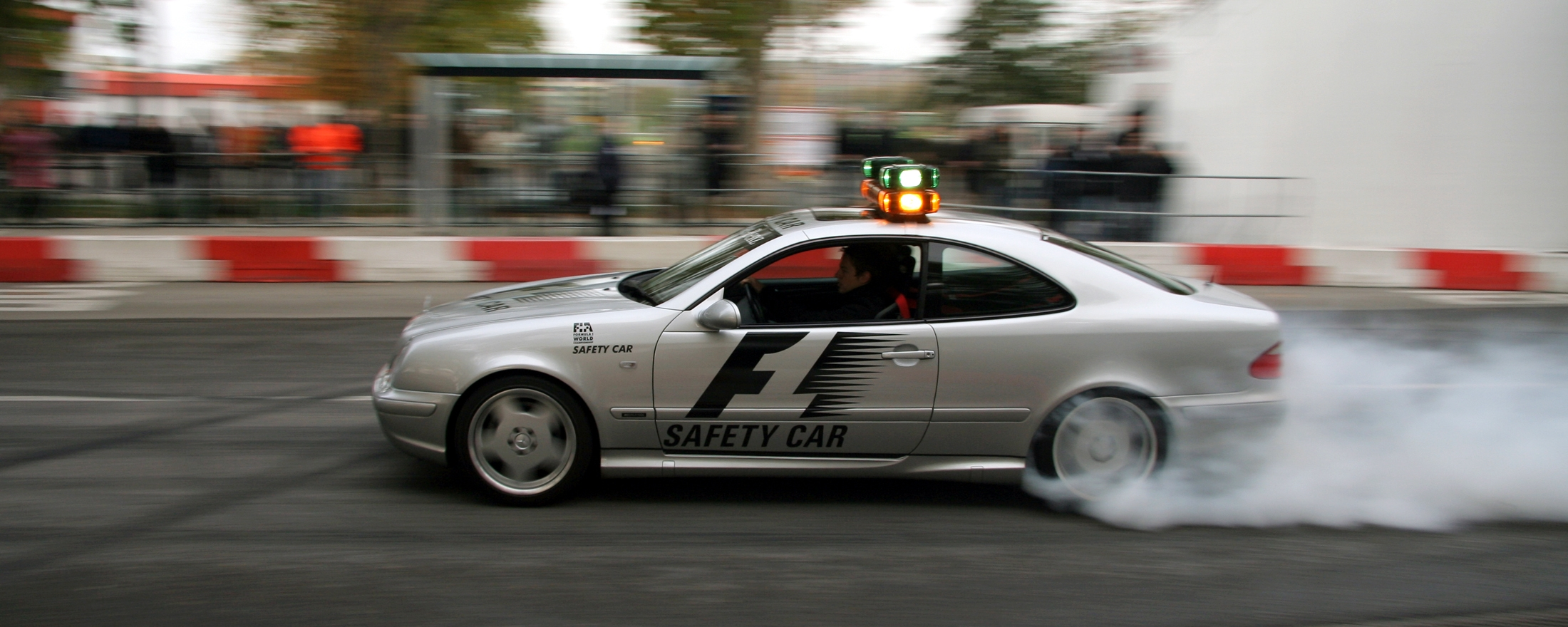
1997 CLK 55 AMG F1 safety car

A specially modified version of the CLK 55 AMG was used during the 1997 F1 season and 1998 F1 Season as a safety car. It pre-dated the production version of the CLK 55 AMG available to customers by two years.

=== CLK GTR ===
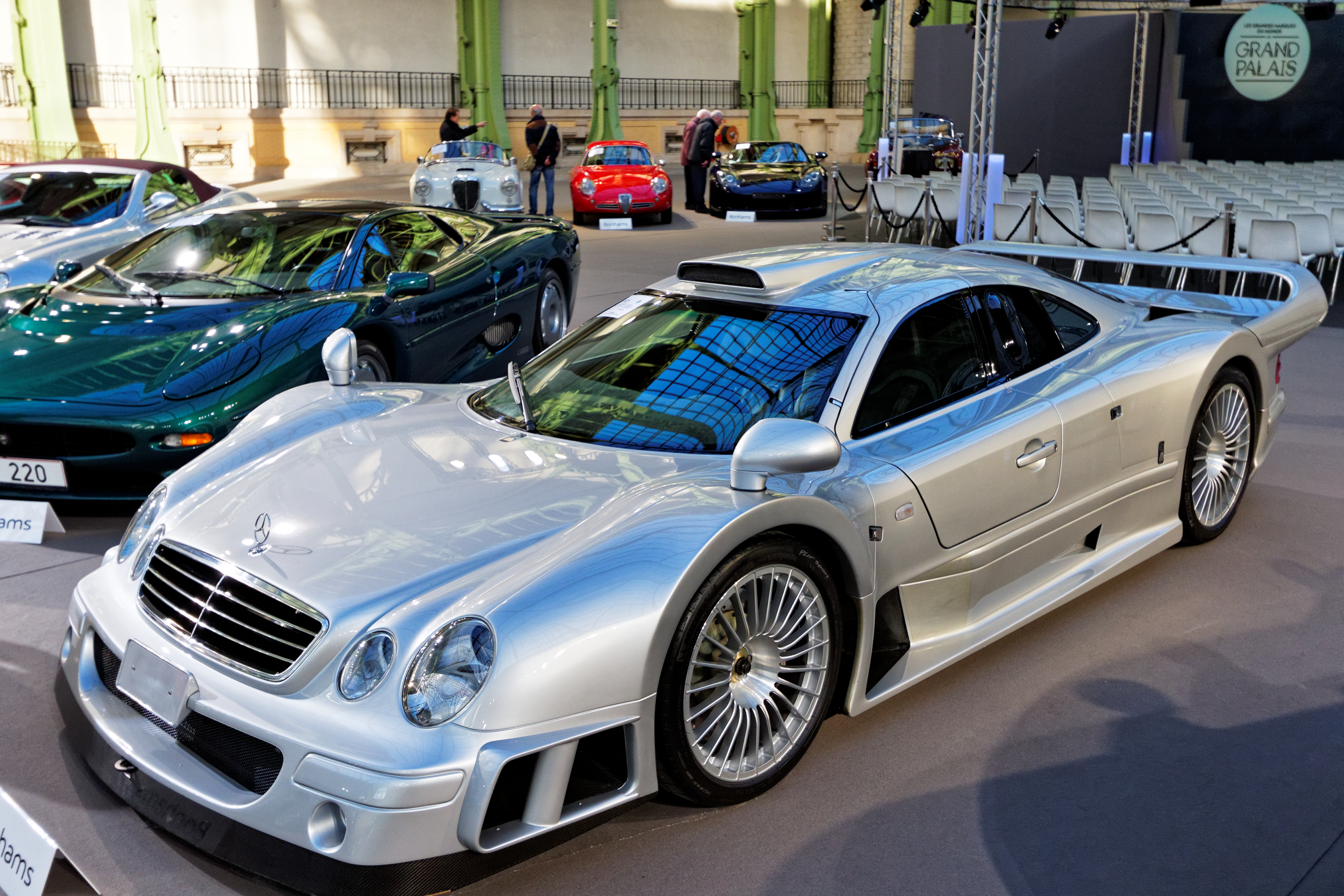
Mercedes-Benz CLK GTR

Mercedes used the instrumentation, front grille and the four headlamps for its purpose-built V12 powered mid-engine race car called the Mercedes-Benz CLK-GTR developed for the 1997 FIA GT Championship. Production of the required 25 road cars began in winter of 1998 and finished in the summer of 1999.

== Motorsport ==
=== CLK DTM ===
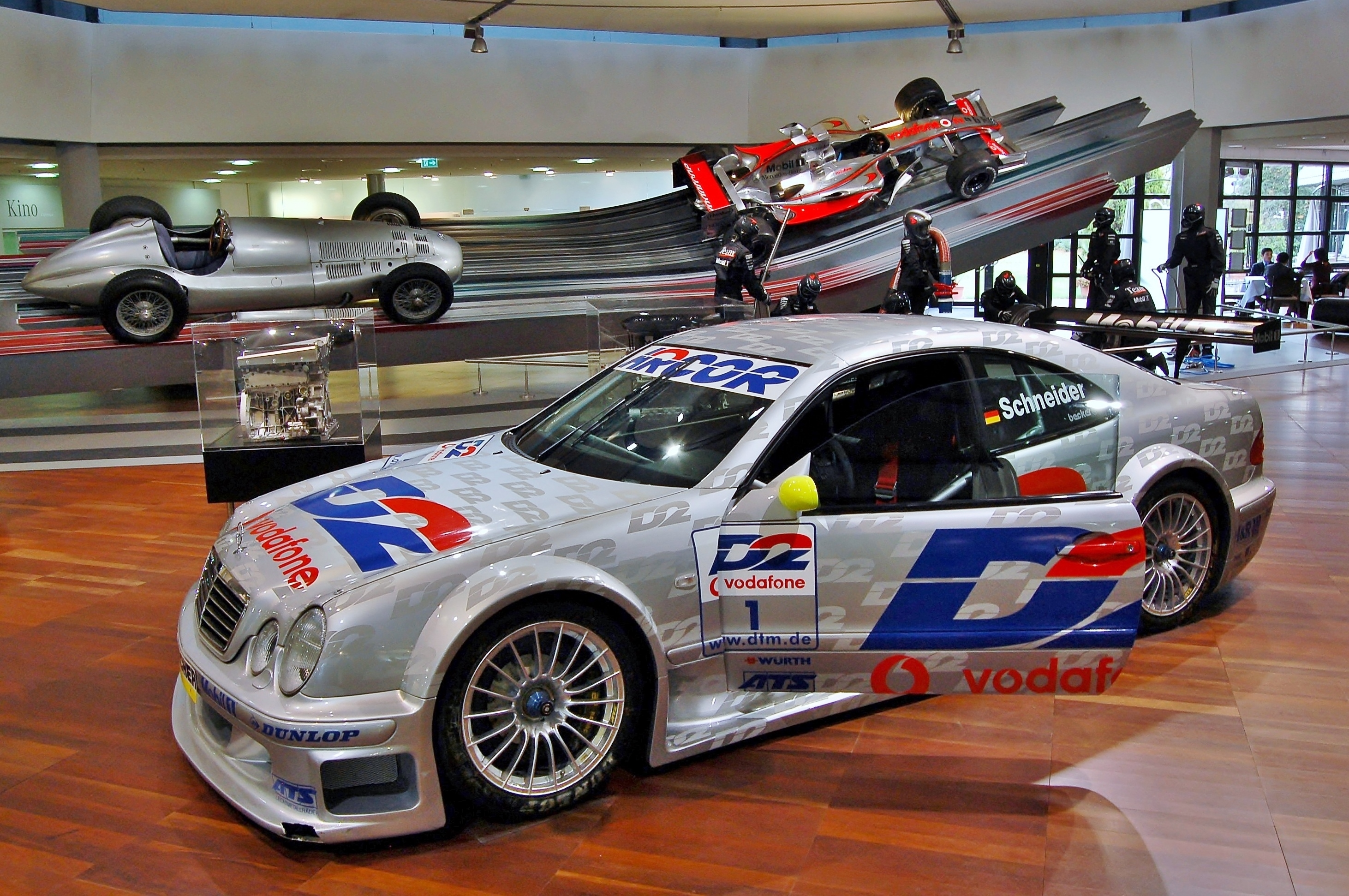
2001 CLK DTM

The Mercedes-Benz CLK DTM was a race version of the CLK developed for the 2000 DTM season.

=== Targa Tasmania ===
Mick Doohan drove a CLK 55 AMG in the 2001 Targa Tasmania.

== Production volumes ==
The following are production figures for the C208/A208 CLK:

Model	Coupé	Cabriolet
CLK 200	45,890	9,077
CLK 200 Kompressor	40,642	15,560
CLK 230 Kompressor	52,034	23,844
CLK 320	68,778	44,781
CLK 430	22,660	20,467
CLK 55 AMG	3,381	1,432
Total	233,367	115,161

== Sales figures ==
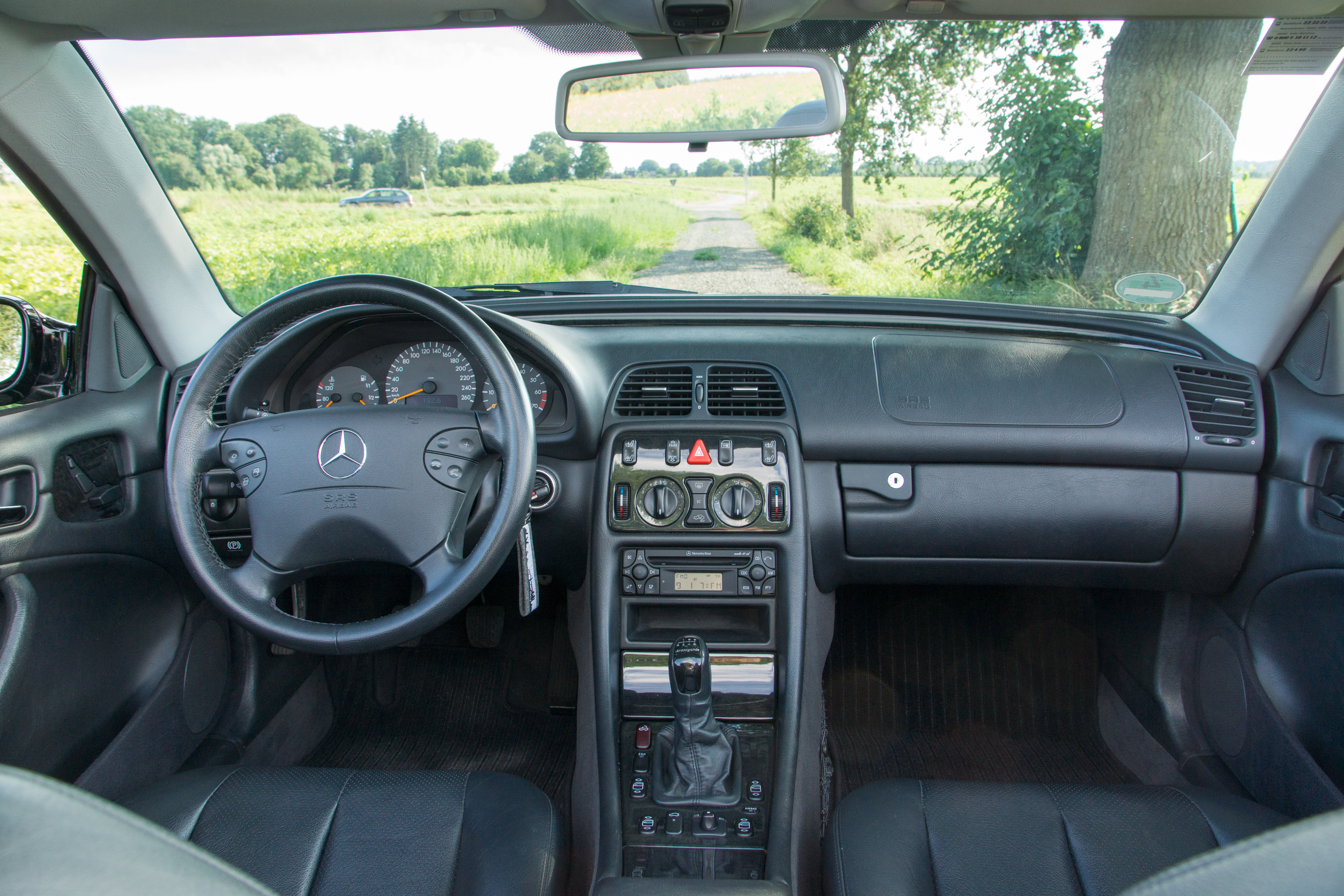
Interior view

The following are the sales figures in Europe and in the United States:

Year	EU total	US total
1997	16,708	1,236
1998	41,941	11,622
1999	57,880	16,714
2000	54,476	17,796
2001	37,377	19,423
2002	35,777	17,251
Total:	244,159	84,042
