= 204 (disambiguation) =

204 was a year of the Julian calendar, in the third century AD.

204 may also refer to:

- 204 BC, year of the pre-Julian Roman calendar, in the third century BC
- 204 (number)
- Peugeot 204, a small family car

== See also ==
- AS-204 (disambiguation)
- VA-204 (disambiguation)
- USS Nirvana II (SP-204), a United States Navy patrol vessel in commission from 1917 to 1918
- 204 Kallisto
- 204 (North Irish) Field Hospital
- M204 (disambiguation)
- No. 204 Squadron RAF
- Flight 204 (disambiguation)
- List of highways numbered 204
