= C204 =

C204 or variant, may refer to:

== Vehicles ==
- Boeing C-204 Thunderbird, a Boeing Canada variant of the Boeing 204 pusher biplane flying boat
- Mercedes-Benz C-Class (C204), a car
- SpaceX Crew Dragon C204, a SpaceX Dragon 2 crew transport space capsule, the first spaceflight tested crew capsule\
- C204, a vehicle used by Pennsylvania mass transit provider CamTran

== Other uses ==
- Intel C204 chipset; see List of Intel Xeon chipsets
- Harrow–Balmoral Road (C204), Victoria, Australia; see List of road routes in Victoria

== See also ==
- 204 (disambiguation)
- C (disambiguation)
