= VA-204 =

VA-204 may refer to:

- VFC-204, a squadron of the U.S. Navy, former designation VA-204
- Virginia State Route 204, a highway in the U.S. state of Virginia
