= M204 =

M204 or M-204 may refer to:

- Model 204, a DBMS for IBM and compatible mainframes
- M-204 (Michigan highway), a state highway in Michigan
