= Flight 204 =

Flight 204 may refer to:

- China Airlines Flight 204, crashed on 26 October 1989 after take-off in Taiwan
- TANS Perú Flight 204, crashed on 23 August 2005 when landing in bad weather in Peru
