= AS-204 =

AS-204 was a Saturn IB launch vehicle that is associated with two missions:

- Apollo 1, scheduled to be the first crewed Apollo flight, but the crew was killed on the launch pad
- Apollo 5, the first test of the Apollo Lunar Module, which used the AS-204 rocket that was originally intended for Apollo 1
