= Mercedes-Benz C-Class (W204) =

Third generation of Mercedes-Benz C-Class

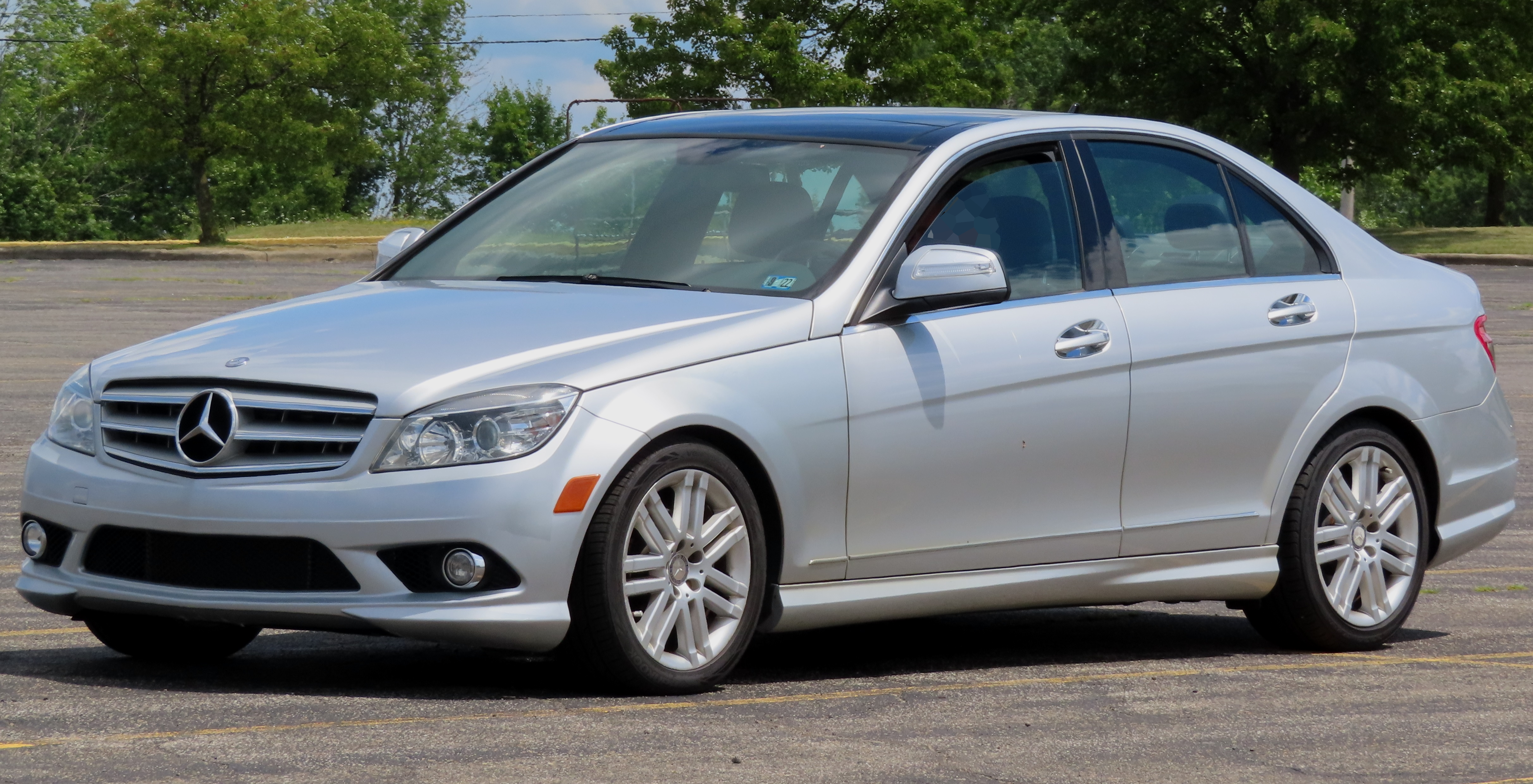

Overview
- Manufacturer: Daimler AG
- Model code: W204 (sedan); S204 (station wagon / estate); C204 (coupé)
- Production: March 2007–March 2014 (sedan); February 2007–March 2014 (station wagon); 2011–2015 (coupé)
- Model years: 2008–2014; 2012–2015 (coupe)
- Assembly: Germany: Bremen; Sindelfingen; South Africa: East London; Brazil: Juiz de Fora; China: Beijing (Beijing Benz); India: Pune (MBI); Malaysia: Pekan (HICOM); Indonesia: Bogor (MBDI); Vietnam: Ho Chi Minh City (MBV); Egypt: 6th of October City (EGA)
- Designer: Karlheinz Bauer, Peter Pfeiffer

Body and chassis
- Class: Compact executive car (D)
- Body style: 4-door sedan; 5-door station wagon; 2-door coupé
- Layout: Front-engine, rear-wheel-drive Front-engine, all-wheel-drive (4MATIC)
- Related: Mercedes-Benz E-Class Coupé/Cabriolet (C207/A207); Mercedes-Benz GLK-Class

Powertrain
- Engine: Petrol: 1.6 L M271 Kompressor BlueEFFIENCY supercharger I4; 1.8 L M271 Kompressor supercharger I4; 1.6–1.8 L M271 CGI BlueEFFIENCY turbo I4; 1.6 L M274 BlueEFFIENCY turbo I4; 2.5 L M272 V6; 3.5 L M272 V6; 3.5 L M276 CGI BlueEFFIENCY V6; 6.2 L M156 AMG V8; Diesel: 2.1 L OM651 CDI BlueEFFIENCY turbo I4; 2.2 L OM646 CDI turbo I4; 3.0 L OM642 CDI turbo V6; 3.0 L OM642 CDI BlueEFFIENCY turbo V6
- Transmission: 6-speed manual; 5-speed 5G-Tronic automatic; 7-speed 7G-Tronic automatic

Dimensions
- Wheelbase: 2,760 mm (108.7 in)
- Length: 4,582 mm (180.4 in) (sedan); 4,596 mm (180.9 in) (wagon); 4,590 mm (180.7 in) (coupé); 4,707–4,711 mm (185.3–185.5 in) (C 63 AMG sedan); 4,701–4,726 mm (185.1–186.1 in) (C 63 AMG wagon); 4,707 mm (185.3 in) (C 63 AMG coupé); 4,776 mm (188.0 in) (C 63 AMG Black Series)
- Width: 1,770 mm (69.7 in); 1,795 mm (70.7 in) (C 63 AMG)
- Height: 1,447 mm (57.0 in)

Chronology
- Predecessor: Mercedes-Benz C-Class (W203); Mercedes-Benz CLC-Class (CL203) (coupe)
- Successor: Mercedes-Benz C-Class (W205)

The Mercedes-Benz C-Class (W204) is the third generation of the Mercedes-Benz C-Class. It was manufactured and marketed by Mercedes-Benz in sedan/saloon (2007–2014), station wagon/estate (2008–2014) and coupé (2011–2015) bodystyles, with styling by Karlheinz Bauer and Peter Pfeiffer.

The C-Class was available in rear- or all-wheel drive, the latter marketed as 4MATIC. The W204 platform was also used for the E-Class Coupé (C207).

Sub-models included the C 200 Kompressor, the C 230, the C 280, the C 350, the C 220 CDI, and the C 320 CDI. The C 180 Kompressor, C 230, and C 200 CDI were available in the beginning of August 2007. The W204 station wagon was not marketed in North America.

Production reached over 2.4 million worldwide, and the W204 was the brand's best selling vehicle at the time.

== Development ==
In the summer of 2003, the development of the W204 C-Class used a "digital prototype", a 2.1 terabyte digital replica of the car, over a virtual distance of 15 million miles. An industry first, the digital testing allowed for crash testing before a physical prototype existed. The design of W204 was finalized in 2003 and a German design patent application was first filed on 9 September 2004, demonstrating a W204 fiberglass design model.

DaimlerChrysler introduced the W204 C-Class on 18 January 2007 at the 2007 Geneva Auto Show. Deliveries began in late March 2007 in almost all European countries.

== Trim levels ==
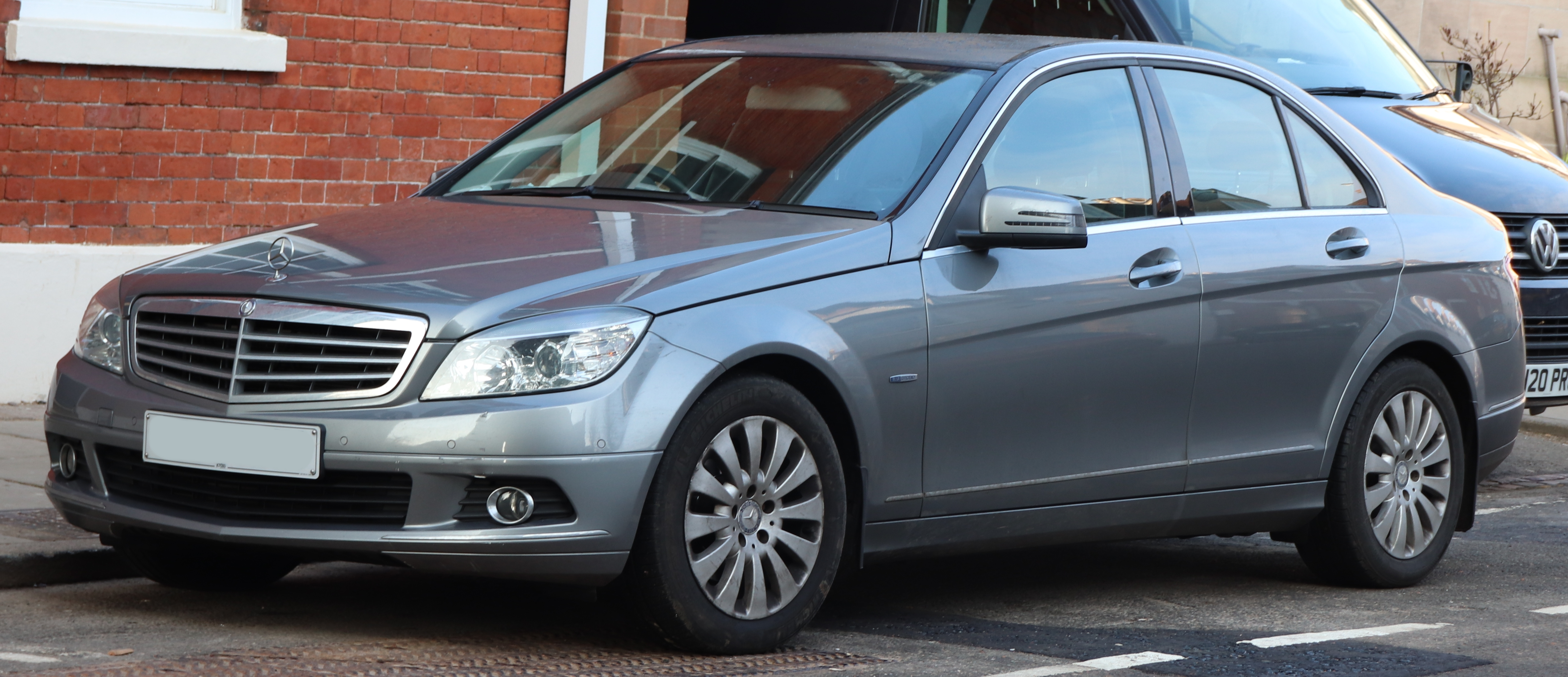

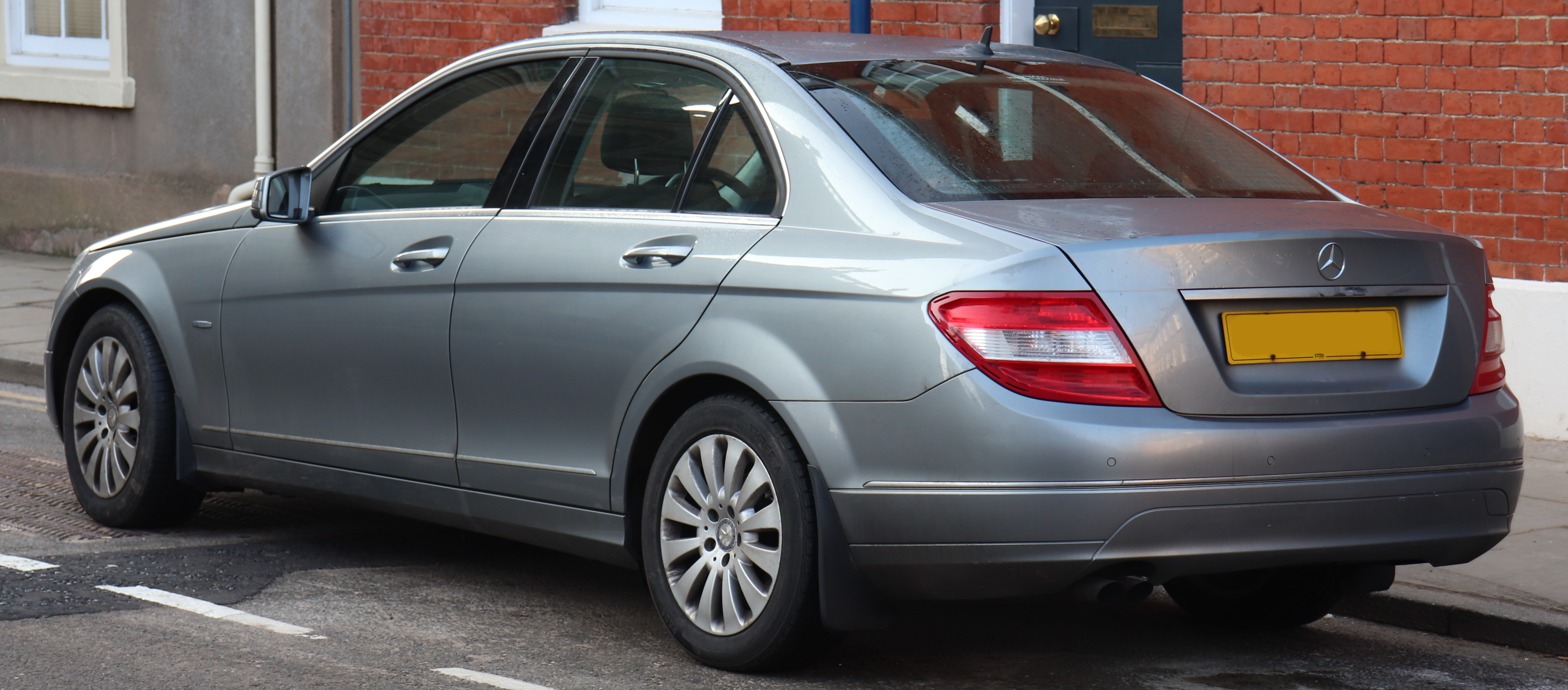
Saloon (pre-facelift)

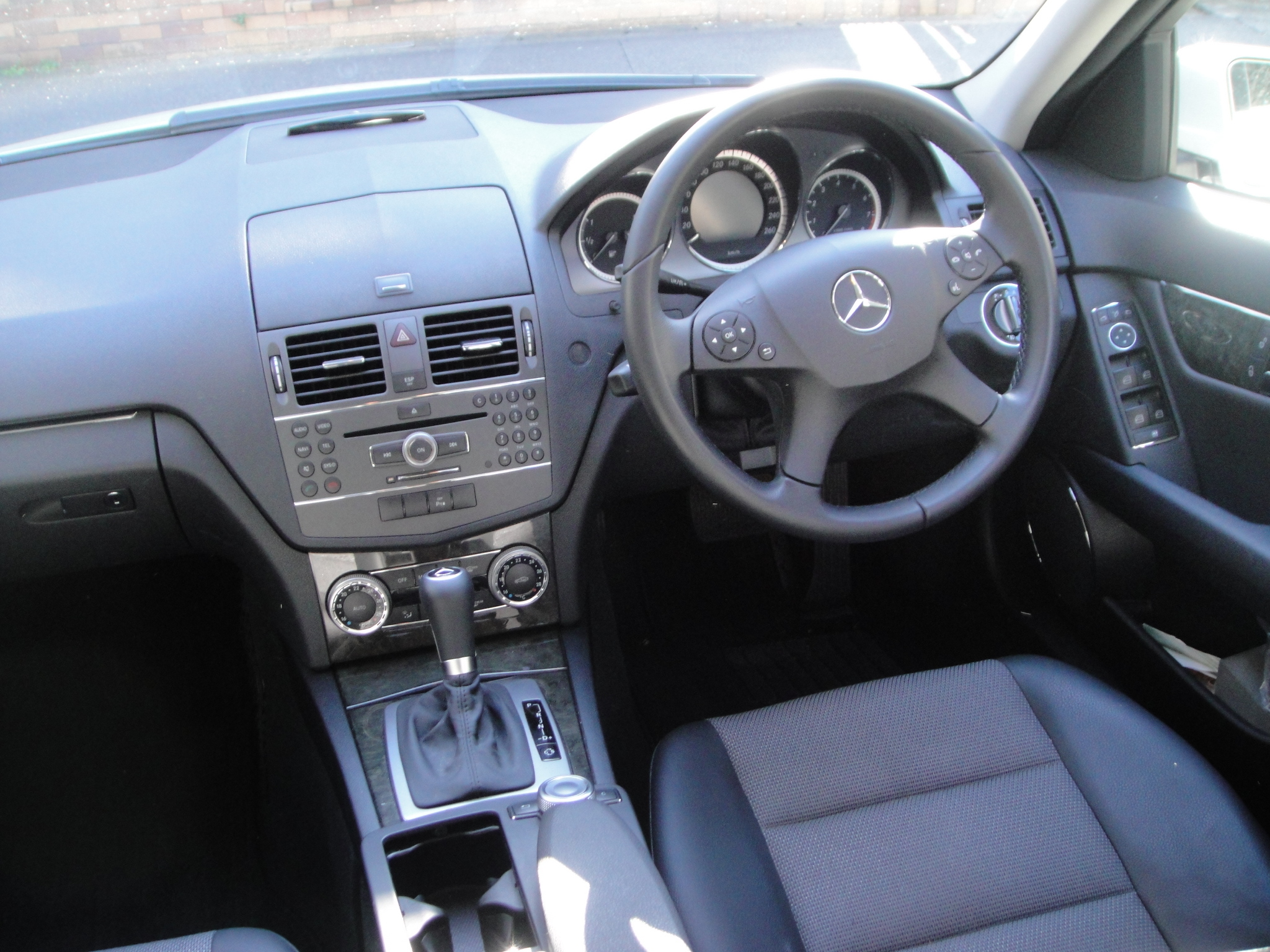
Interior (pre-facelift)

Typically, Mercedes offered the W204 in three trim and equipment levels, marketed as Classic, Elegance and Avantgarde. The base trim, marketed as Classic, was offered with smaller four-cylinder engines and cloth seats or optional leatherette, marketed as ARTICO. Elegance trim featured standard leatherette upholstery with optional leather. The Avantgarde offered Liverpool fabric/leatherette seats or optional leather. Classic and Elegance retained a traditional Mercedes-Benz grille, with horizontal chrome bars and standing hood emblem. Avantgarde trim featured a 'sport' grille with three wide matt-finish horizontal bars and a large, central emblem as well as an optional AMG bodykit, sport seats, three-spoke sport steering wheel, lower and stiffer sports suspension, upgraded brake piston calipers, and larger alloy wheels. W204s advertising predominantly featured the sport grille and AMG bodykit, especially in Canada and the United States.

The W204 line offered a range of four-cylinder petrol and diesel engines, a 3.5-litre V6 petrol and a 3.0-litre V6 diesel engine are also available. The AMG variant, marketed as the C 63 AMG used the 6.2-litre V8 petrol engine.

In the United Kingdom, the Classic trim level was marketed as the SE, and the Avantgarde trim with the AMG Sport Package was marketed as the Sport.

In the United States, the C250, made in South Africa, in Avantgarde trim with the AMG Sport Package was available on the C-250 with a four-cylinder turbocharged 1.8L engine, 7 speed automatic gearbox and RWD and the C-300 (the only US market C-Class with a standard manual transmission (manual transmission was only available with RWD), with 4MATIC system available as an option) and the C 350 Sport (RWD only).The Elegance trim was only available on the C 300 Luxury with an option for the 4MATIC all-wheel-drive system, There were no Classic/SE trim models, no models with diesel engine, and no station wagon models available in the US market.

The Canadian market offered only the AMG Line trim level; four-cylinder models and station wagon models were not offered. The base C 230 model (renamed the C 250 from the 2010 model year) was exclusive to the Canadian market and was the only model that has amenities similar to the Elegance/Luxury trim with the traditional grille and three-point star hood ornament. The other C-Class models (C 300, C 350 and C 63 respectively) offered the AMG body kit and sport grille as standard. These amenities were available as an CAD800 option for the C 230 model as the Sport Package (which rose to CAD1200 for the 2011 model year due to the new LED fog lights).

All models except the C 63 AMG and C350 were available in both rear-wheel-drive and all-wheel-drive (4Matic).

== Equipment ==
For the 2008–2011 model year, the dashtop features a deployable central sliding cover panel over an LCD colour screen for entertainment and information functions. The optional navigation system, marketed as COMAND APS integrates a larger, 7-inch TFT screen into the deployable panel. Post MY2012 models feature a fixed screen similar to E-Class and GLK-Class models.

2010 W204s received revised turn signals integrated into the side mirrors. From the 2011 model year on, the bumper fog lamps in the AMG bodykit were replaced by LED lights, except for the C 63 AMG which retained its unique bumper.

The C-class offered a system marketed as the agility control package, which provided revised agility and ride quality via hydro-mechanics, which analysed road conditions and driving habits, and adjusted damper and suspension settings to provide a balance between ride comfort and agility. An optional advanced agility control package offered a sport mode button to enable a stiffer suspension setting and more precise handling.

== Models ==
=== Vision C 220 BlueTEC (2007) ===
Unveiled at the 2007 Geneva Motor Show, the Vision C 220 BlueTEC is a concept saloon demonstrating Mercedes-Benz's first 4-cylinder Bluetec Diesel engine complying with the Euro 6 emission standard. The BlueTEC includes an inline-4 variable nozzle turbocharged engine with third-generation common-rail direct injection generating a power output of 170 PS (125 kW; 168 hp) and 400 N⋅m (295 lb⋅ft) of torque, a 6-speed manual transmission, exhaust gas recirculation, particulate filter, oxidization and SCR catalytic converters. The car accelerates from 0–100 km/h (62 mph) in 8.5 seconds, and has a top speed of 229 km/h (142 mph).

=== C 300 BlueTEC Hybrid (2007) ===
Unveiled at the 2007 Tokyo Motor Show, the C 300 Bluetec Hybrid is a near-production study based on the C-Class Estate. The C 300 Bluetec has a 4-cylinder hybrid engine generating a combined power output of 224 PS (165 kW; 221 hp) and 560 N⋅m (413 lb⋅ft) of torque.

=== 4MATIC models (2007–2014) ===
Available from mid 2007, the 4MATIC models include a 7G-Tronic seven-speed automatic transmission, permanently active all wheel drive with 45:55 torque split, a transfer case with multi-disc clutch centre differential, 4ETS traction control and Electronic Stability Program. The C 320 CDI 4MATIC and C 350 4MATIC models also include Elegance and Avantgarde trim package option, which include 17-inch light-alloy wheels, a luxury multifunction steering wheel and fine wood or aluminium trim in the interior.

=== C-Class Estate (2007–2014) ===
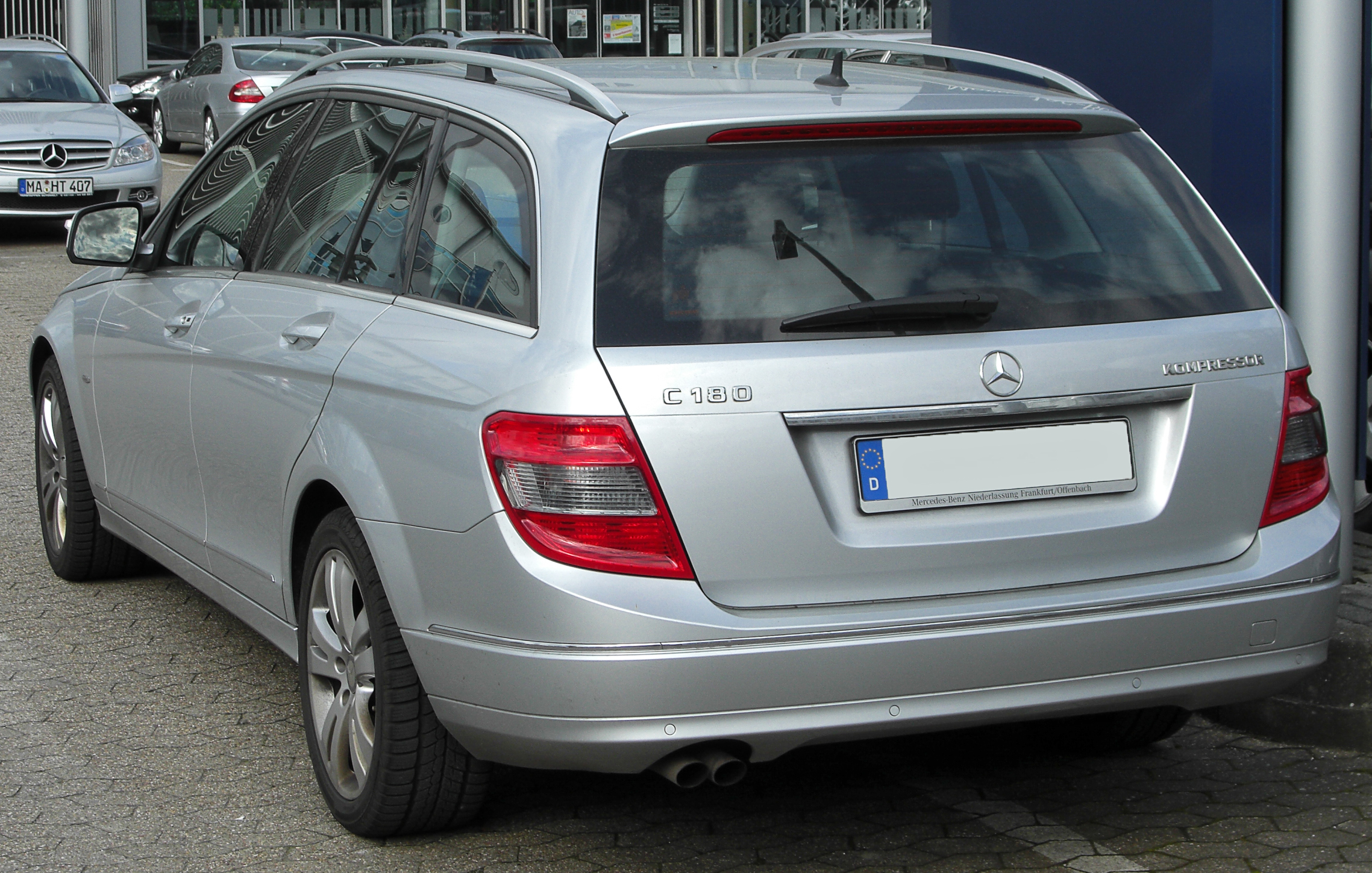
Estate (pre-facelift)

The C-Class Estate was unveiled at the 2007 Frankfurt International Motor Show. Later, it was displayed at the 40th Tokyo Motor Show 2007, followed by the Auto China 2010. The estate models went on sale in late 2007; early models included: C 200 CDI, C 220 CDI, C 320 CDI, C 320 CDI 4MATIC, C 180 Kompressor, C 200 Kompressor, C 230, C 280, C 350 and the C 63 AMG.

=== BlueEFFICIENCY models (2008–2014) ===
The BlueEFFICIENCY variants achieved better economy and weight reduction by using a newly developed windscreen made of laminated glass by AGC shared with the Maybach saloon, optimised noise-insulating firewall lining, lightweight forged wheels with low rolling resistance tyres from Michelin, a lightweight transmission; reducing drag coefficient to 0.25 via smooth under-body cladding, a radiator grille shutter, sealed joints between the hood and headlamps as well as between the rear fender and headlamps, streamlined exterior mirrors housing, lowered suspension (15 millimetres height reduction), aerodynamically tuned wheels; servo pump shut-off in power steering system[?]; a new 6-speed manual transmission with newly developed final drive having further-improved anti friction bearings and forged differential gears, longer final-drive ratios (C 180 Kompressor and C 200 CDI models only); ECO Training mode cockpit; reduced engine displacement, optimised combustion chamber, mixture formation and engine friction (C 180 Kompressor); direct injection with max 200 bar piezoelectric fuel injectors (C 350 CGI BlueEFFICIENCY).

Early models were introduced in Spring 2008, including the C 180 Kompressor BlueEFFICIENCY, C 200 CDI BlueEFFICIENCY and the C 350 CGI BlueEFFICIENCY.

The C 220 CDI BlueEFFICIENCY, C 250 CDI BlueEFFICIENCY and the C 250 CGI BlueEFFICIENCY were introduced in 2009. The C 250 CGI BlueEfficiency includes direct injection. All 3 models include the choice of saloon or station wagon bodystyles.

The C 180 CGI BlueEFFICIENCY, C 200 CGI BlueEFFICIENCY, C 220 CDI BlueEFFICIENCY and the C 250 CDI 4MATIC BlueEFFICIENCY were added to the range in 2010, with the C 250 CDI 4MATIC BlueEFFICIENCY and the C 220 CDI BlueEFFICIENCY being available in autumn 2010. All of the 4 models include the choice of saloon or estate bodystyles. ECO start/stop function is included for C 180 CGI BlueEFFICIENCY, C 200 CGI BlueEFFICIENCY and the C 220 CDI BlueEFFICIENCY. Direct petrol injection were added for C 180 CGI BlueEFFICIENCY and the C 200 CGI BlueEFFICIENCY. The C 250 CDI 4MATIC BlueEFFICIENCY includes Electronic Stability Program and the 4ETS traction system.

C 350 CGI BlueEFFICIENCY (2008–2010)

The C 350 CGI BlueEFFICIENCY was unveiled at the 2008 Geneva Motor Show. Standard trim level on the C 350 CGI BlueEFFICIENCY included standard Elegance or Avantgarde packages, and 3.5L 90 degree V6 stratified charge direct injection M272E35 engine was used. The saloon model includes an AMG lip spoiler on the boot lid, a dual-flow exhaust system with polished stainless steel tailpipes, a seven-speed 7G-TRONIC automatic transmission, 16-inch light alloy wheels with 17-inch wheels available as a no cost option, a speed-sensitive steering and the "Speedtronic" cruise control with a variable speed limiter.

C 350 BlueEFFICIENCY (2011–2014)

Coinciding with the 2011 facelift, new 3.5L 60 degree V6 M276DE35 engine debuted on C350 in 2011. Although M276 was also a stratified charge direct injection engine as the predecessor M272, the moniker 'CGI' was dropped from the naming. The radiator grille shutter for saloon and stationwagon, and the foldable rear seat back as well as the boot lid spoiler on the saloon body were eliminated. 225/45R17 front and 245/40R17 rear tires became standard, with 225/40R18 front and 255/35R18 rear tires as a no cost option. Power output of the M276DE35 engine was increased from 215 kW (292 PS; 288 hp) to 225 kW (306 PS; 302 hp) for 2012–2014.

C 250 CDI BlueEFFICIENCY Prime Edition (2008–2014)

The C 250 CDI BlueEFFICIENCY Prime Edition was unveiled at the 2008 Paris Motor Show. It is a limited (5,000 units) version of the C 250 CDI BlueEfficiency saloon with the Avantgarde package included as standard. Standard features include 16-inch light-alloy wheels with 205/55 R16 tyres with 16-inch 7-spoke wheel with 205/55 R16 tyres and 17-inch light-alloy 5-twin-spoke wheels with 225/45 R17 front and 245/40 R17 rear tyres available as no-cost options; floor mats with "Prime Edition" lettering and aluminium interior trim with optional bird's-eye maple interior trim.

== AMG models (2008–2015) ==
=== C 63 AMG (2008–2015) ===
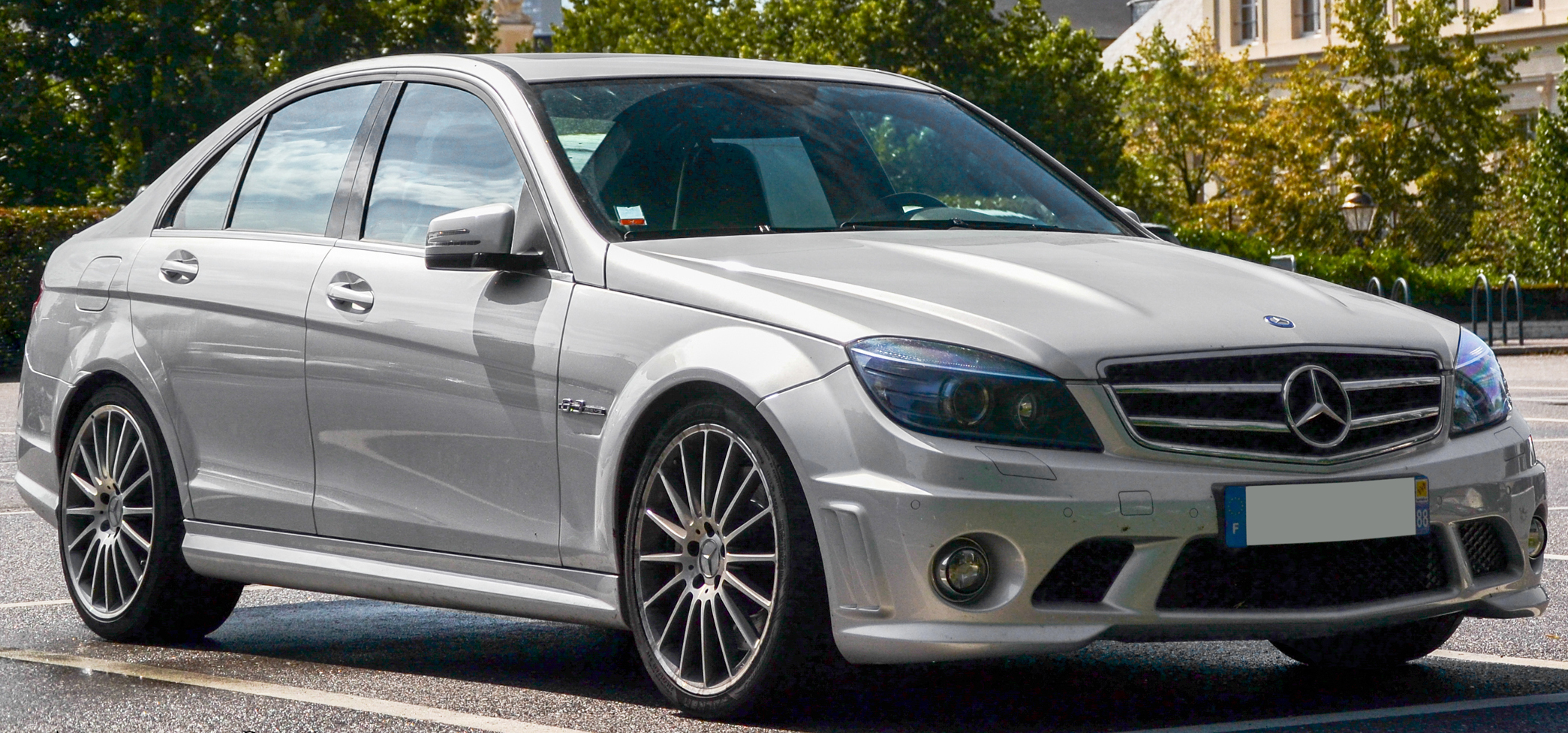

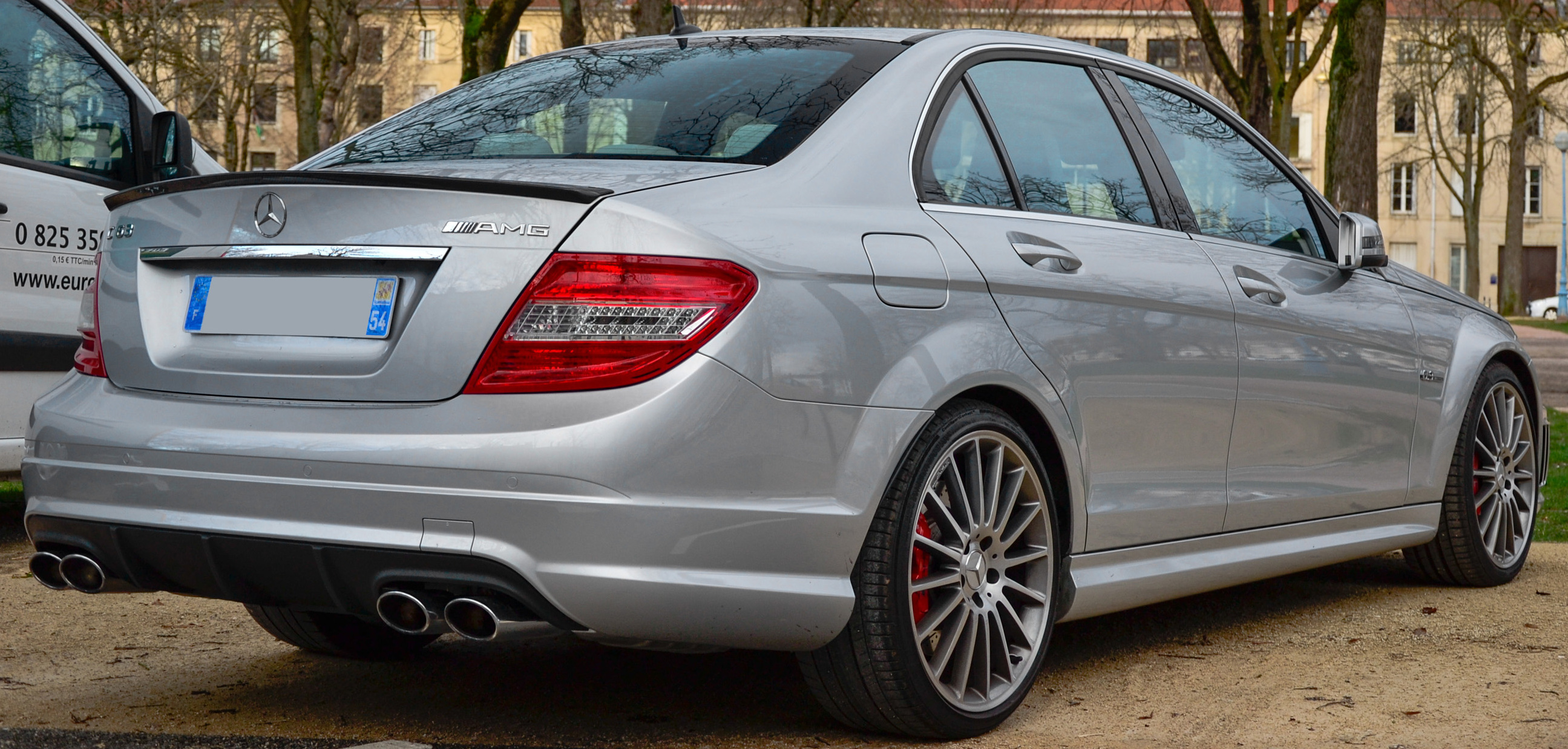
Mercedes-Benz C 63 AMG saloon (pre-facelift)

Its AMG C-Class predecessors had essentially featured bolt on performance modifications, and according to Car and Driver, these earlier AMG models suffered from "relentless understeer" and "heavy steering". The C 63 AMG has a revised front suspension that is shared with the CLK 63 AMG Black Series. The ESP features a full defeat mode, interfering only under heavy braking. The C 63 AMG also had the quickest, most responsive steering of any Mercedes automobile at the time.

The Mercedes-Benz M156 engine, despite being detuned compared to other AMG offerings using the same powerplant, still provides the C 63 AMG with more horsepower and torque over its direct rivals such as the Audi RS4 and BMW M3. The 7G-Tronic 7-speed automatic transmission has AMG SpeedShift with four shift modes – Comfort, Sport, Sport + and Manual – with the last one running with the converter locked allowing the driver to hold the engine at the rev limit. Car and Driver tested the car in their December 2007 issue and recorded a 0–97 km/h (60 mph) acceleration time of 3.9 seconds and a quarter-mile time of 12.3 seconds at 187 km/h (116 mph).

=== C 63 AMG Performance Package Plus (2008–2010: P30), (2011–2015: P31 +30 hp) ===
In 2009, Mercedes-AMG introduced the Performance Package Plus for the C 63 AMG saloon and estate models. In 2011, this package included increasing power to 487 PS (358 kW; 480 hp) at 6,800 rpm and 600 N⋅m (443 lb⋅ft) of torque at 5,000 rpm, compound brake discs on the front axle and red or yellow painted brake callipers, composite brake discs connected aluminium bowl via cast-in arms, carbon fibre lip spoiler on the boot lid (saloon), AMG performance steering wheel in Nappa leather with a grip area trimmed in Alcantara. The package went on sale in December 2009. Optional black designo leather, covering the upper section of the dashboard, the upper door trim and the armrest on the centre console, was available in conjunction with Nappa leather appointments as an option.

=== AMG P31 Development Package (2011–2015) ===
In 2010, Mercedes-AMG introduced a new AMG P31 Development Package which included a power increase to 487 PS (358 kW; 480 hp) as compared to 457 PS (336 kW; 451 hp) for the standard model. Top speed was also increased to 280 km/h (174 mph) as a result. When equipped with this package, the C 63 AMG has a revised ECU and lightweight crankshaft, as well as rotating assembly components such as new rods and forged pistons from the M159 engine found in the SLS AMG.

=== C 63 AMG Edition 507 (2013–2015) ===
The Edition 507 was first shown at the Geneva Motor Show in 2013 as the swansong of the much feted 6.2-litre naturally aspirated V8 engine. Available as a Coupe, Saloon and Estate, the Edition 507 came with a power increase to 507 PS, hence the name, which was available at 6800 rpm with torque of 610 Nm at 5200 rpm. Engine wise, it adopts the slightly lighter V8 from the SLS AMG, which included an uprated ECU, new conrods, a lightweight crankshaft and forged pistons. Externally, the Edition 507 carries the same vented aluminium bonnet from the Black Series, light-alloy spoke wheels, AMG side stripes and a boot lid spoiler. For the interior, there was the alcantara covered steering wheel, a special AMG emblem on the gear shifter, optional two-tone leather and an Edition 507 plaque on the passenger side fascia. Performance wise, the limited top speed was increased to 280 km/h (174 mph).

=== Concept 358 (2010) ===
Unveiled at the 2010 Australian International Motor Show, the Concept 358 is a version of C 63 AMG saloon with designo Pearl Orange body colour, AMG Performance Package Plus, 19-inch multi spoke alloy wheels in black, Keyless-Go entry system and extended designo leather upholstery.

=== C-Class DR 520 (2010) ===
The DR 520 is a limited edition of the C 63 AMG with the AMG Performance Package Plus made specifically for the UK market. Introduced by Mercedes Specialist Products Division, it includes increased engine power to 525 PS (386 kW; 518 hp) and 650 N⋅m (479 lb⋅ft) of torque.

== Testing ==
The W204 C-Class completed 24 million test kilometers, and was until 2009 the most tested Mercedes-Benz ever. However, 2009 also saw the launch of the W212 E-Class, which completed 36 million test kilometers.

== Motorsport ==
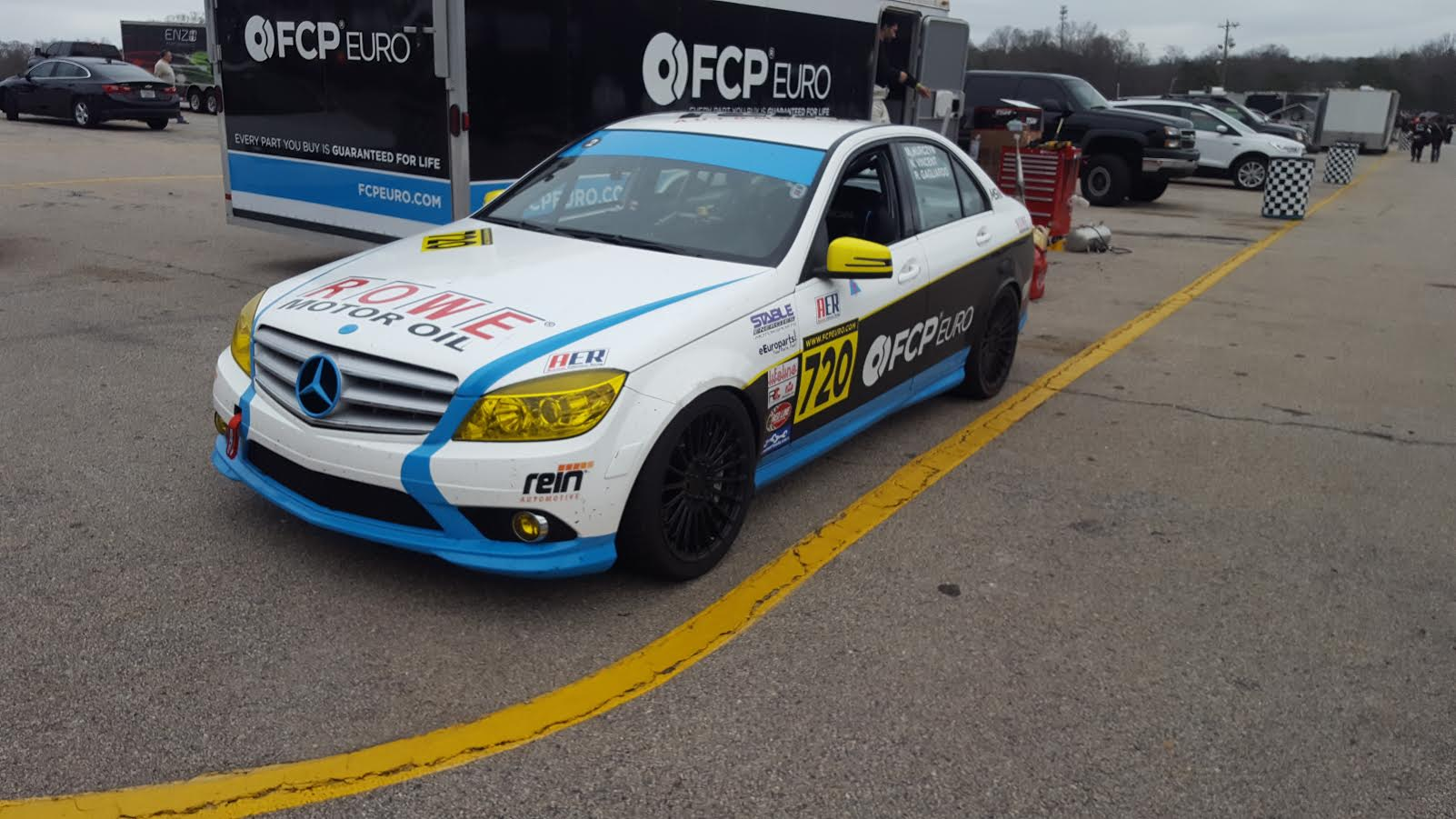
FCP Euro's 2010 Mercedes C 300 at Road Atlanta

The C 63 AMG was the official Safety Car for the second DTM race of the 2008 season in Oschersleben. In the 2009 Formula 1 season, C 63 AMG Estate became the Official F1 Medical Car.

FCP Euro modified a C 300 to compete in the 2017 American Endurance Racing Series. The car made its debut appearance at Road Atlanta February 10, 2017.

A C 63 AMG Estate with the AMG Performance Package was used as official F1 Medical Car at the 2011 Formula 1 World Championship series.

== Technical specifications ==
=== Engines ===
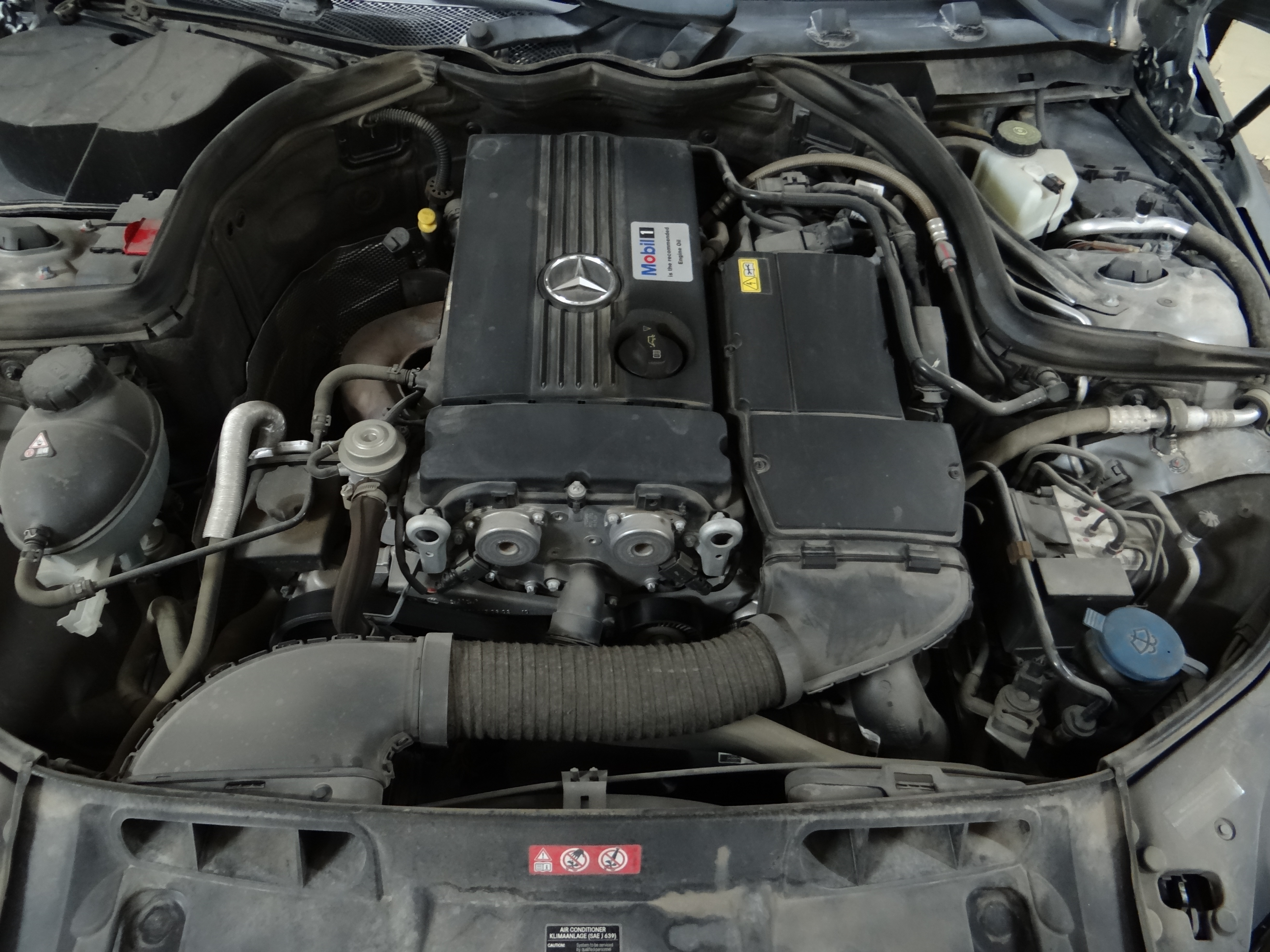
The engine bay of a C 200 Kompressor showcasing the Mercedes-Benz M271 engine

Petrol engines
Model	Years	Type	Power and torque
C 180 KOMPRESSOR	2006–2009	1,796 cc (110 cu in) supercharged 16V I4 (M 271 KE 18 ML red)	156 PS (115 kW; 154 hp) at 5,200 rpm 230 N⋅m (170 lb⋅ft) at 2,500–4,200 rpm
C 180 KOMPRESSOR BlueEFFICIENCY	2008–2011	1,597 cc (97 cu in) supercharged 16V I4 (M 271 KE 16 ML red)	156 PS (115 kW; 154 hp) at 5,200 rpm, 230 N⋅m (170 lb⋅ft) at 3,000–4,500 rpm
C 180 CGI BlueEFFICIENCY	2009–2011	1,796 cc (110 cu in) turbocharged 16V I4 (M 271 DE 18 AL red)	156 PS (115 kW; 154 hp) at 5,000 rpm, 250 N⋅m (184 lb⋅ft) at 1,600–4,200 rpm
C 180 BlueEFFICIENCY	2011–2014	1,595 cc (97 cu in) turbocharged 16V I4 (M 274 DE 16 AL)	156 PS (115 kW; 154 hp) at 5,300 rpm, 250 N⋅m (184 lb⋅ft) at 1,250–4,000 rpm
C 200 KOMPRESSOR	2007–2010	1,796 cc (110 cu in) supercharged 16V I4 (M 271 KE 18 ML)	184 PS (135 kW; 181 hp) at 5,500 rpm, 250 N⋅m (184 lb⋅ft) at 2,800–5,000 rpm
C 200 CGI BlueEFFICIENCY	2010–2011	1,796 cc (110 cu in) turbocharged 16V I4 (M 271 DE 18 AL)	184 PS (135 kW; 181 hp) at 5,250 rpm, 270 N⋅m (199 lb⋅ft) at 1,800–4,600 rpm
C 230	2007–2009	2,496 cc (152 cu in) 24V V6 (M 272 KE 25)	204 PS (150 kW; 201 hp) at 6,100 rpm, 245 N⋅m (181 lb⋅ft) at 2,900–5,500 rpm
C 250 CGI BlueEFFICIENCY	2009–2011	1,796 cc (110 cu in) turbocharged 16V I4 (M 271 DE 18 LA)	204 PS (150 kW; 201 hp) at 5,500 rpm, 310 N⋅m (229 lb⋅ft) at 2,000–4,300 rpm
C 250 Sport (C250 AMG for Chinese Market)	2012–2015	1,796 cc (110 cu in) turbocharged 16V I4 (M 271 DE 18 LA)	204 PS (150 kW; 201 hp) at 5,500 rpm, 310 N⋅m (229 lb⋅ft) at 2,000–4,300 rpm
C 280	2007–2009	2,996 cc (183 cu in) 24V V6 (M 272 KE 30)	231 PS (170 kW; 228 hp) at 6,000 rpm, 300 N⋅m (221 lb⋅ft) at 2,500–5,000 rpm
C 280 4MATIC	2007–2009	2,996 cc (183 cu in) 24V V6 (M 272 KE 30)	231 PS (170 kW; 228 hp) at 6,000 rpm, 300 N⋅m (221 lb⋅ft) at 2,500–5,000 rpm
C 300	2009–2011	2,996 cc (183 cu in) 24V V6 (M 272 KE 30)	231 PS (170 kW; 228 hp) at 6,000 rpm, 300 N⋅m (221 lb⋅ft) at 2,500–5,000 rpm
C 300 4MATIC	2009–2011	2,996 cc (183 cu in) 24V V6 (M 272 KE 30)	231 PS (170 kW; 228 hp) at 6,000 rpm, 300 N⋅m (221 lb⋅ft) at 2,500–5,000 rpm
C 350 CGI BlueEFFICIENCY	2007–2010	3,498 cc (213 cu in) 24V V6 (M 272 KE 35)	272 PS (200 kW; 268 hp) at 6,000 rpm, 350 N⋅m (258 lb⋅ft) at 2,400–5,000 rpm
C 350 CGI BlueEFFICIENCY 4MATIC	2007–2010	3,498 cc (213 cu in) 24V V6 (M 272 KE 35)	272 PS (200 kW; 268 hp) at 6,000 rpm, 350 N⋅m (258 lb⋅ft) at 2,400–5,000 rpm
C 350 BlueEFFICIENCY	2011	3,498 cc (213 cu in) 24V V6 (M 276 DE 35)	292 PS (215 kW; 288 hp) at 6,400 rpm, 365 N⋅m (269 lb⋅ft) at 3,000–5,100 rpm
C 350	2006–2011	3,498 cc (213 cu in) 24V V6 (M 272 E 35)	272 PS (200 kW; 268 hp) at 6,000 rpm, 350 N⋅m (258 lb⋅ft) at 2,500–5,000 rpm
C 350 4MATIC	2006–2011	3,498 cc (213 cu in) 24V V6 (M 272 E 35)	272 PS (200 kW; 268 hp) at 6,000 rpm, 350 N⋅m (258 lb⋅ft) at 2,500–5,000 rpm
C 63 AMG	2007–2011	6,208 cc (379 cu in) 32V V8 (M 156 KE 63)	457 PS (336 kW; 451 hp) at 6,800 rpm, 600 N⋅m (443 lb⋅ft) at 5,000 rpm; Performance Package Plus (2009): 487 PS (358 kW; 480 hp) at 6,800 rpm, 600 N⋅m (443 lb⋅ft) at 5,000 rpm; AMG P31 Development Package (2010): 487 PS (358 kW; 480 hp) at 6,800 rpm, 600 N⋅m (443 lb⋅ft) at 5,000 rpm

Diesel engines
Model	Years	Type	Power and torque
C 200 CDI	2007–2009	2,148 cc (131 cu in) turbochharged 16V I4 (OM 646 DE 22 LA red)	136 PS (100 kW; 134 hp) at 3,800 rpm, 270 N⋅m (199 lb⋅ft) at 1,600–3,000 rpm
C 200 CDI BlueEFFICIENCY	2008–2009	2,148 cc (131 cu in) turbochharged 16V I4 (OM 646 DE 22 LA red)	136 PS (100 kW; 134 hp) at 3,800 rpm, 270 N⋅m (199 lb⋅ft) at 1,600–3,000 rpm
C 200 CDI BlueEFFICIENCY	2009–2014	2,143 cc (131 cu in) turbocharged 16V I4 (OM 651 DE 22 LA red)	136 PS (100 kW; 134 hp) at 2,800–3,000 rpm, 330 N⋅m (243 lb⋅ft) at 1,600–2,800 rpm
C 220 CDI	2007–2009	2,148 cc (131 cu in) turbocharged 16V I4 (OM 646 DE 22 LA)	170 PS (125 kW; 168 hp) at 3,800 rpm, 400 N⋅m (295 lb⋅ft) at 2,000 rpm
C 220 CDI BlueEFFICIENCY	2009–2011	2,143 cc (131 cu in) 2-stage turbocharged 16V I4 (OM 651 DE 22 LA)	170 PS (125 kW; 168 hp) at 3,000–4,200 rpm, 400 N⋅m (295 lb⋅ft) at 1,400–2,800 rpm
C 250 CDI BlueEFFICIENCY	2009–2011	2,143 cc (131 cu in) 2-stage turbocharged 16V I4 (OM 651 DE 22 LA)	204 PS (150 kW; 201 hp) at 4,200 rpm, 500 N⋅m (369 lb⋅ft) at 1,600–1,800 rpm
C 250 CDI BlueEFICIENCY Prime Edition	2008–2009	2,143 cc (131 cu in) 2-stage turbocharged 16V I4 (OM 651 DE 22 LA)	204 PS (150 kW; 201 hp) at 4,200 rpm, 500 N⋅m (369 lb⋅ft) at 1,600–1,800 rpm
C 250 CDI 4MATIC BlueEFFICIENCY	2010–2011	2,143 cc (131 cu in) 2-stage turbocharged 16V I4 (OM 651 DE 22 LA)	204 PS (150 kW; 201 hp) at 4,200 rpm, 500 N⋅m (369 lb⋅ft) at 1,600–1,800 rpm
C 320 CDI	2007–2009	2,987 cc (182 cu in) turbocharged 24V V6 (OM 642 DE 30 LA)	224 PS (165 kW; 221 hp) at 3,800 rpm, 510 N⋅m (376 lb⋅ft) at 1,600–2,800 rpm
C 320 CDI 4MATIC	2007–2009	2,987 cc (182 cu in) turbocharged 24V V6 (OM 642 DE 30 LA)	224 PS (165 kW; 221 hp) at 3,800 rpm, 510 N⋅m (376 lb⋅ft) at 1,600–2,800 rpm
C 350 CDI	2009	2,987 cc (182 cu in) turbocharged 24V V6 (OM 642 DE 30 LA)	224 PS (165 kW; 221 hp) at 3,800 rpm, 510 N⋅m (376 lb⋅ft) at 1,600–2,800 rpm
C 350 CDI 4MATIC	2009	2,987 cc (182 cu in) turbocharged 24V V6 (OM 642 DE 30 LA)	224 PS (165 kW; 221 hp) at 3,800 rpm, 510 N⋅m (376 lb⋅ft) at 1,600–2,800 rpm
C 350 CDI BlueEFFICIENCY	2009–2011	2,987 cc (182 cu in) turbocharged 24V V6 (OM 642 DE 30 LA)	231 PS (170 kW; 228 hp) at 3,800 rpm, 540 N⋅m (398 lb⋅ft) at 1,600–2,400 rpm
C 350 CDI 4MATIC BlueEFFICIENCY	2009–2011	2,987 cc (182 cu in) turbocharged 24V V6 (OM 642 DE 30 LA)	231 PS (170 kW; 228 hp) at 3,800 rpm, 540 N⋅m (398 lb⋅ft) at 1,600–2,400 rpm

The C 230 is sold as C 250 in Japan and Canada and as C 260 in China.

Since November 2009, the updated CGI engines replaced the Kompressor engines, with the same power output, more torque, and better fuel efficiency. The C 250 CGI, using the M271 engine with charged gasoline injection engine replaced the C 230 using the 2.5-litre V6 engine. The M271 engine generated the same power output but had more torque.

The C-Class (W204) models were available with a choice of rear and all-wheel drive (the AWD system is the fourth-generation of the 4Matic system which was not available in right-hand drive format), along with a variety of four and six-cylinder engines along with a 6.2-litre V8 engine exclusive to the C 63 AMG. 4Matic denotes all-wheel-drive models.

For the C 220 CDI BlueEfficiency, automatic start/stop system was added in 2010.

=== Transmissions ===
Petrol models
Model	Years	Standard	Optional
C 180 KOMPRESSOR	2007–2009	6-speed manual	5-speed automatic (5G-TRONIC)
C 180 KOMPRESSOR BlueEFFICIENCY	2008–2010	6-speed manual	5 speed automatic with paddle shifters (5G-TRONIC) (2008–2009), 5-speed automatic (5G-TRONIC) (2009)
C 180 CGI BlueEFFICIENCY	2010–2011	6-speed manual	5-speed automatic (5G-TRONIC) (2009–2011)
C 200 KOMPRESSOR	2007–2010	6-speed manual	5-speed automatic (5G-TRONIC) (2007–2009)
C 200 CGI BlueEFFICIENCY	2010–2011	6-speed manual	5-speed automatic (5G-TRONIC) (2009–2011)
C 230	2007–2009	6-speed manual	7-speed automatic (7G-TRONIC)
C 250 CGI BlueEFFICIENCY	2009–2011	5-speed automatic (5G-TRONIC) (2009–2011)	
C 280	2007–2009	6-speed manual	7-speed automatic (7G-TRONIC)
C 280 4MATIC	2007–2009	7-speed automatic (7G-TRONIC)	
C 300	2009–2011	6-speed manual	7-speed automatic (7G-TRONIC)
C 300 4MATIC	2009–2011	7-speed automatic (7G-TRONIC)	
C 350	2007–2011	7-speed automatic (7G-TRONIC)	
C 350 4MATIC	2007–2011	7-speed automatic (7G-TRONIC)	
C 350 CGI BlueEFFICIENCY	2008–2011	7-speed automatic (7G-TRONIC)	
C 63 AMG	2011–2011	7-speed automatic (AMG SPEEDSHIFT MCT)	

Diesel models
Model	Years	Standard	Optional
C 200 CDI	2007–2009	6-speed manual	5-speed automatic (5G-TRONIC)
C 200 CDI BlueEFFICIENCY	2008–2009	6-speed manual	
C 200 CDI BlueEFFICIENCY (OM651)	2009–2011	6-speed manual	5-speed automatic (5G-TRONIC) (2009–2011)
C 220 CDI	2007–2009	6-speed manual	5-speed automatic (5G-TRONIC)
C 220 CDI BlueEFFICIENCY	2009–2011	6-speed manual	5-speed automatic (5G-TRONIC) (2009–2011)
C 250 CDI BlueEFFICIENCY	2009–2011	6-speed manual	5-speed automatic (5G-TRONIC) (2008–2011)
C 250 CDI BlueEFFICIENCY Prime Edition	2008–2009	6-speed manual	
C 250 CDI 4MATIC BlueEFFICIENCY	2010–2011	7-speed automatic (7G-TRONIC)	
C 320 CDI	2007–2009	6-speed manual	
C 320 CDI 4MATIC	2007–2009	7-speed automatic (7G-TRONIC)	
C 350 CDI	2009	6-speed manual	
C 350 CDI 4MATIC	2009	7-speed automatic (7G-TRONIC)	
C 350 CDI BlueEFFICIENCY	2009–2011	7-speed automatic (7G-TRONIC)	
C 350 CDI 4MATIC BlueEFFICIENCY	2009–2011	7-speed automatic (7G-TRONIC)	

== Awards ==
The 2007 Mercedes-Benz C Class was awarded Car of the Year in Australia by the Wheels Magazine, edging out the Ford Mondeo and the Mazda 2 for the award. It was also awarded "Executive Car of the Year" by Top Gear Magazine for the 2007 Top Gear Awards as well as being awarded 2007–08 Japan's Import Car of the Year in late 2007 and again in late 2011 for 2011–12. The 2007 Mercedes-Benz C-Class was awarded 'Yellow Angel 2008' by ADAC, and the C 63 AMG was awarded Europe Tuning Car of the Year 2008 by journalists of the UIGA, the Italian association of motoring journalists.

== Marketing ==
During the launch of the C-Class saloon in 2007, Mercedes-Benz started the 'C-for Yourself' campaign developed by BBDO France, featuring an online campaign with a new 360-degree soft configurator and a host of interactive films; A 30-/40-second television commercial with the then new Formula 1 world champion Fernando Alonso as brand ambassador. An 'Exclusive Driving Experience' campaign in Barcelona (1–3 April 2007) allowed some 80 consumers from all over Europe to experience the C-Class in an especially attractive environment. Vacationers who stayed at selected Robinson Club Resorts and Westin Hotels & Resorts facilities in Germany, Austria, Scotland, Italy, Spain, Portugal and Greece between May and September 2007 had the opportunity to test-drive the new C-Class. Premium shopping mall attendants could also test drive the cars during April and May 2007. The new C-Class also appeared in the German Touring Car Masters series starting on 22 April 2007. Mercedes-Benz also started a Mobile Special campaign that included special mobile client software that could be called up either by text messaging (SMS) from a number assigned to each country or directly from the Mercedes-Benz website in the participating markets. The Mobile Special also contained the dates of C-Class events and invitations to callers. The C-Class Avantgarde model with the AMG package appeared in the game Second Life starting on 16 March 2007, where the player can purchase the virtual model for 1,500 Linden Dollars or virtually test-drive it on a challenging track.

As part of the C-Class station wagon campaign, Mercedes-Benz launched a print ad showing the C-Class station wagon on a stage, flanked by a curtain and background scenery. The previously launched Mobile Special campaign was expanded to include the wagon. Mercedes-Benz also held test driving events between December 2007 and April 2008 in selected Robinson Club resorts, various vacation resorts in Fuerteventura and Turkey, Serfaus, Fiss, Ladis, and Ski Amadé (Austria). Between December 2007 and January 2008, spontaneous test driving events were also held in selected upmarket shopping centres and malls in Germany.

== Production ==
Since 2007, the W204 C-Class saloons were produced in Sindelfingen German, and East London, South Africa. The W204 C-Class Estate production began at DaimlerChrysler in Bremen. At the time of its market launch (mid-2007), 75,000 orders had been received for the W204 C-Class saloon. The total sales of the C-Class reached 261,500 in 2007. In mid-2008, the C-Class sales exceeded 300,000 units. In late 2008, the C-Class sales reached 500,000 units, with 440,000 saloons and 60,000 wagons. The 250,000th C-Class – an iridium silver metallic C 220 CDI saloon – was produced in Sindelfingen and delivered to a customer in Japan. In mid-2010, the C-Class sales reached one million units, with 840,000 saloons and over 160,000 wagons. United States occupied 25 percent of total sales, followed by Germany and China. The C-Class Coupé production began in 2011 at the Bremen plant.

== W204 facelift (2011–2015) ==
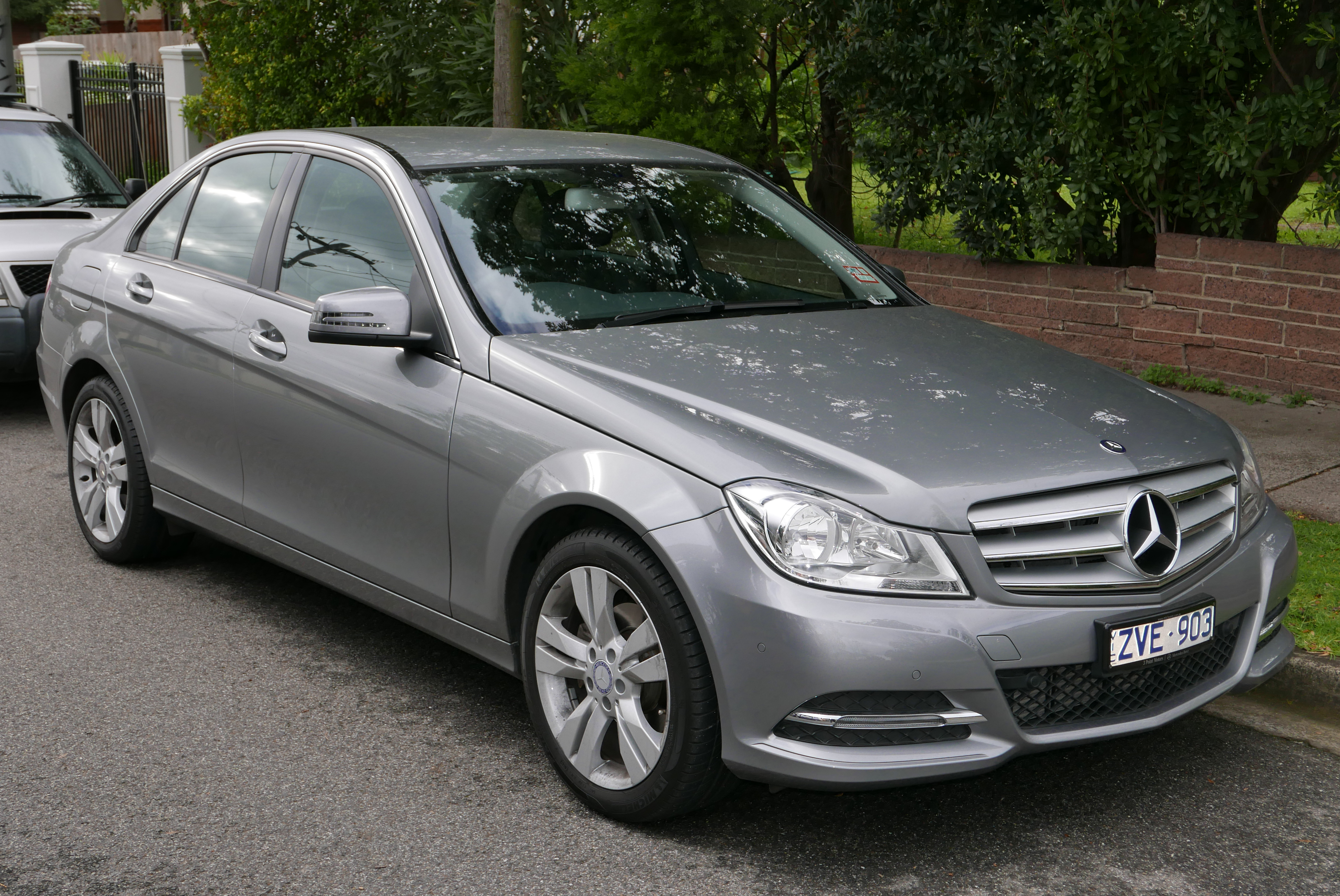

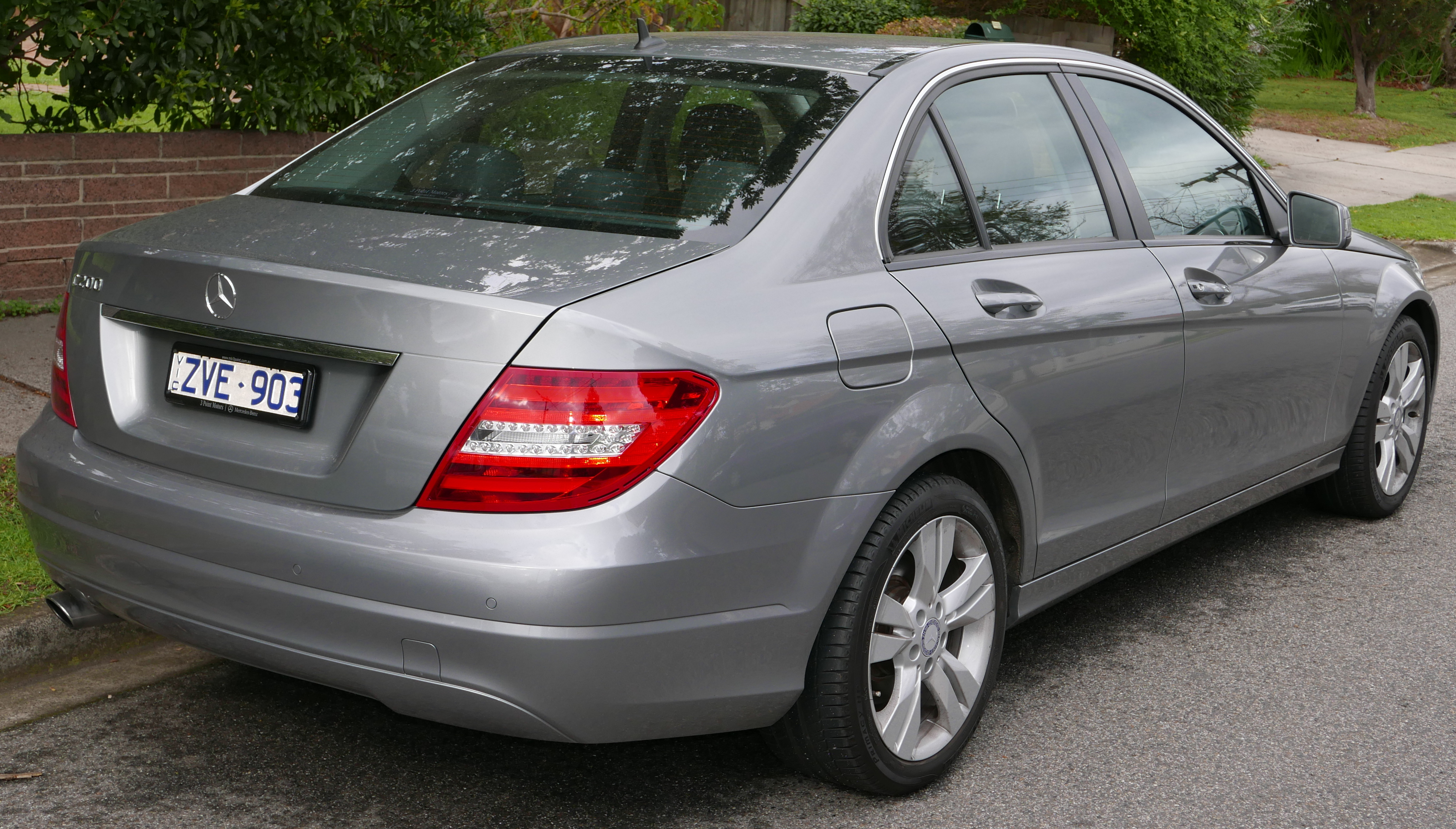
Saloon (facelift)

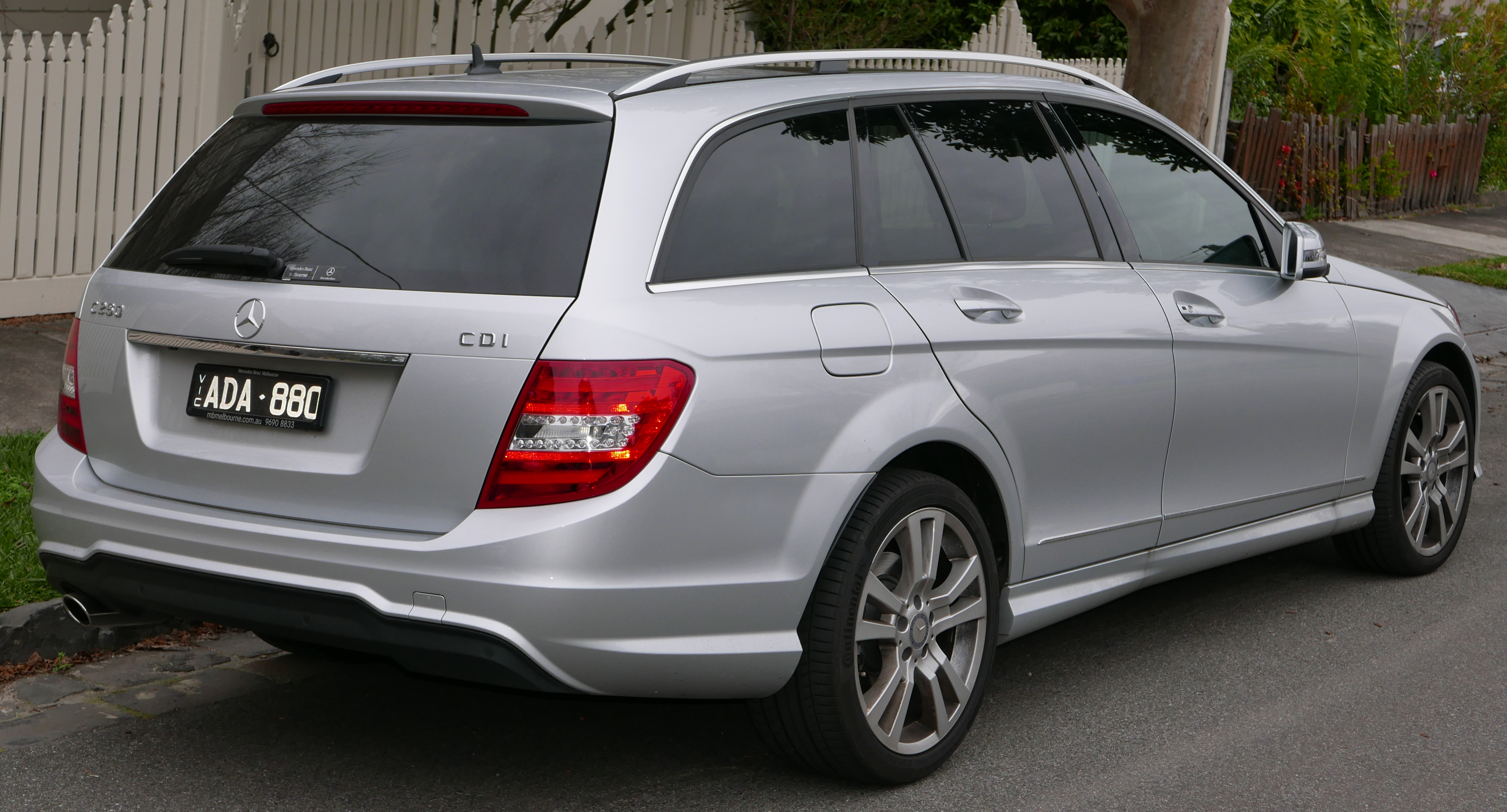
Wagon (facelift)

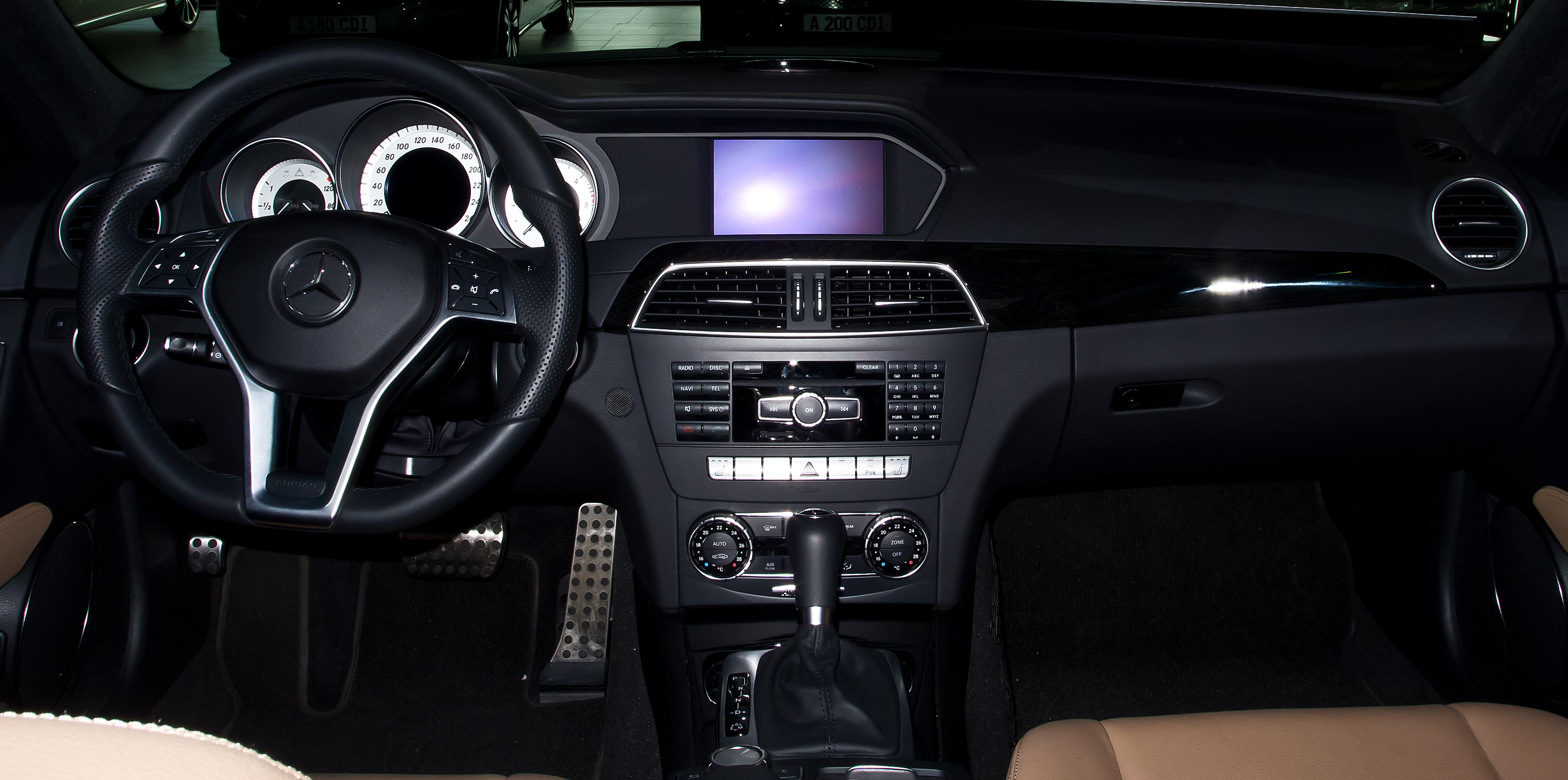
Interior (facelift)

In December 2010, Mercedes released some photos and details of W204 C-Class facelift, with the vehicle officially unveiled at the 2011 Detroit Auto Show, and later at the Auto Shanghai 2011.

New features of the facelift model includes, an engine start-stop system, 7G-TRONIC PLUS gearbox available for base models with revised gear ratios to improve fuel economy. There was also a minor revision of the exterior appearance which included LED daytime running lights, LED taillights, a new hood and bumpers. The interior was significantly reworked to bring its arrangement and quality closer to the W212 E-Class and the W221 S-Class. There is a high resolution screen on the dashboard which has visual functions similar to the S and CL Class models, and it also has the new Mercedes-Benz Comand APS system first seen on the W212 E-Class.

Ten new driving assistance systems, including Adaptive Highbeam Assist, Active Lane Keeping Assist, Active Blind Spot Assist, Attention Assist drowsiness detection, Distronic Plus proximity control, Speed Limit Assist and Parking guidance including Parktronic and the Pre-Safe brake were now available. The new-generation of telematics include internet access and a 3D navigation display with plastic city views.

The multimedia system Comand Online now provided internet access when car is stationary. Beginning in mid-2012, the C-Class models equipped with Comand Online now has the new Mercedes-Benz emergency call system called "eCall".

All of the engine variants were now classed as BlueEfficiency units. All petrol engines now had direct injection system. All of the models now came with a 5-speed automatic transmission, except of C 300 CDI 4Matic which had the 7G-TRONIC PLUS 7-speed automatic transmission. The C 350 received the new 3.5L V6 engine with a 60-degree vee-angle and direct injection. There was also a new entry-level C 250 model which had a 1.8-litre turbocharged inline-4 engine with direct injection.

Orders for the Saloon and Estate models introduction took place in early 2011, and the European market introduction took place from March 2011. Early models include C 180 BlueEfficiency, C 200 BlueEfficiency, C 250 BlueEfficiency, C 350 BlueEfficiency, C 350 4Matic BlueEfficiency, C 180 CDI BlueEfficiency, C 200 CDI BlueEfficiency, C 220 CDI BlueEfficiency, C 250 CDI BlueEfficiency, C 250 CDI 4Matic BlueEfficiency and the C 300 CDI 4Matic BlueEfficiency. Sales of the C 250 CDI 4Matic BlueEfficiency began in June 2011. Sales of the C 350 CDI BlueEfficiency Saloon and Estate began in mid-2011.

=== North America ===
==== United States ====
The North American models for the 2012 model year became available for order at the dealers starting in September 2011.

The C 300 and C 300 4Matic (having the 3.0-litre V6 engine) retained their 90-degree vee-angle V6 engines and the 7G-tronic transmission, while the 6-speed manual transmission which was previously available for the rear-wheel drive C 230/250 and the C 300 was discontinued in the North American markets due to low sales. For the 2013 model year, the C 300 received the new 60-degree vee-angle V6 engine, which shares the same displacement but is detuned from the 3.5-litre engine found in the 2012 and later C 350. The C 300's new 3.5-litre engine generates a power output of 248 hp (185 kW; 251 PS) and 251 lb⋅ft (340 N⋅m) of torque, as compared to the 228 hp (170 kW; 231 PS) and 221 lb⋅ft (300 N⋅m) of torque from the old M272 3.0-litre engine.

==== Canada ====
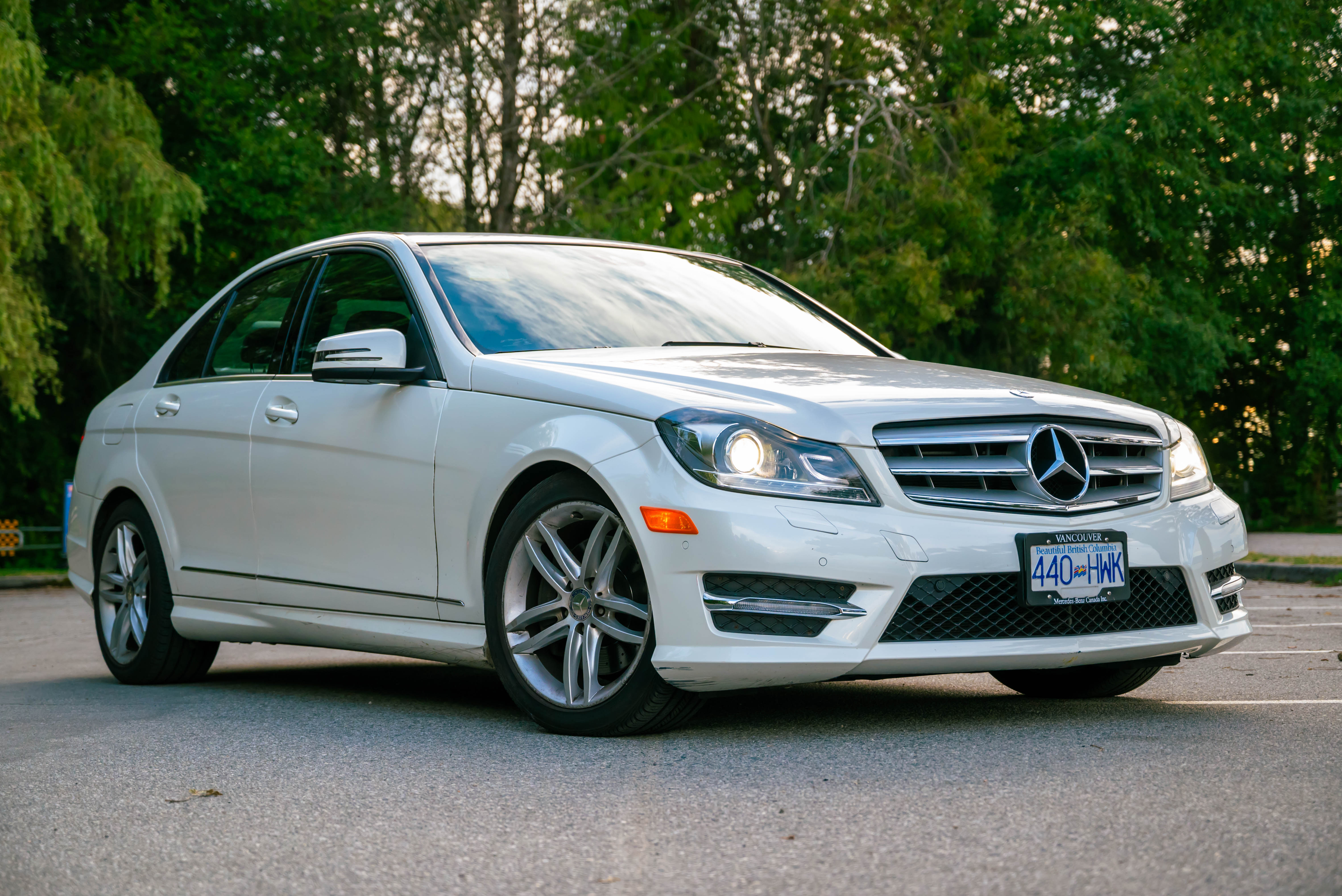
Canadian model 2013 W204 C300 4MATIC Sedan (facelift) with AMG Bodykit and suspension, finished in Diamond White Pearl with Black interior

For the 2012 model year, the C 250 RWD sedan with its turbocharged inline-4 engine (replacing the 2010–11 C 250 model with a 2.5-litre V6 which was badged as the C 230 from 2008 to 2009) was sold alongside the C 250 4Matic (another Canada-only model with a 2.5-litre V6 which was badged as the C 230 4Matic from 2008 to 2009) since the 4Matic system was not compatible with the turbocharged inline-4 engine. For the 2013 model year, the sedan lineup was simplified considerably with the C 250 turbo inline-4 RWD, C 300 4MATIC, C 350 RWD, C 350 4MATIC, and C 63 AMG.

=== Japan ===
The facelifted C-Class went on sale in Japan in mid-2011. Early models include C 180 BlueEfficiency (with a 1.8-litre engine) (Saloon/Estate/Coupé), C 200 BlueEfficiency (Saloon/Estate), C 250 BlueEfficiency (Saloon/Estate) and the C 350 BlueEfficiency (Saloon/Estate). Delivery of C 180 BlueEFFICIENCY (with 1.8L engine) for all body styles began in 2012. Beginning in mid-2012, available models include the C 180 BlueEfficiency (with a 1.8-litre engine) (Saloon/Estate/Coupé), C 200 BlueEfficiency (Saloon/Estate), C 250 BlueEfficiency (Saloon/Estate/Coupé), C 350 BlueEfficiency (Saloon/Estate) and the C 63 AMG (Saloon/Estate/Coupé).

=== C-Class Coupé (2011–2015) ===
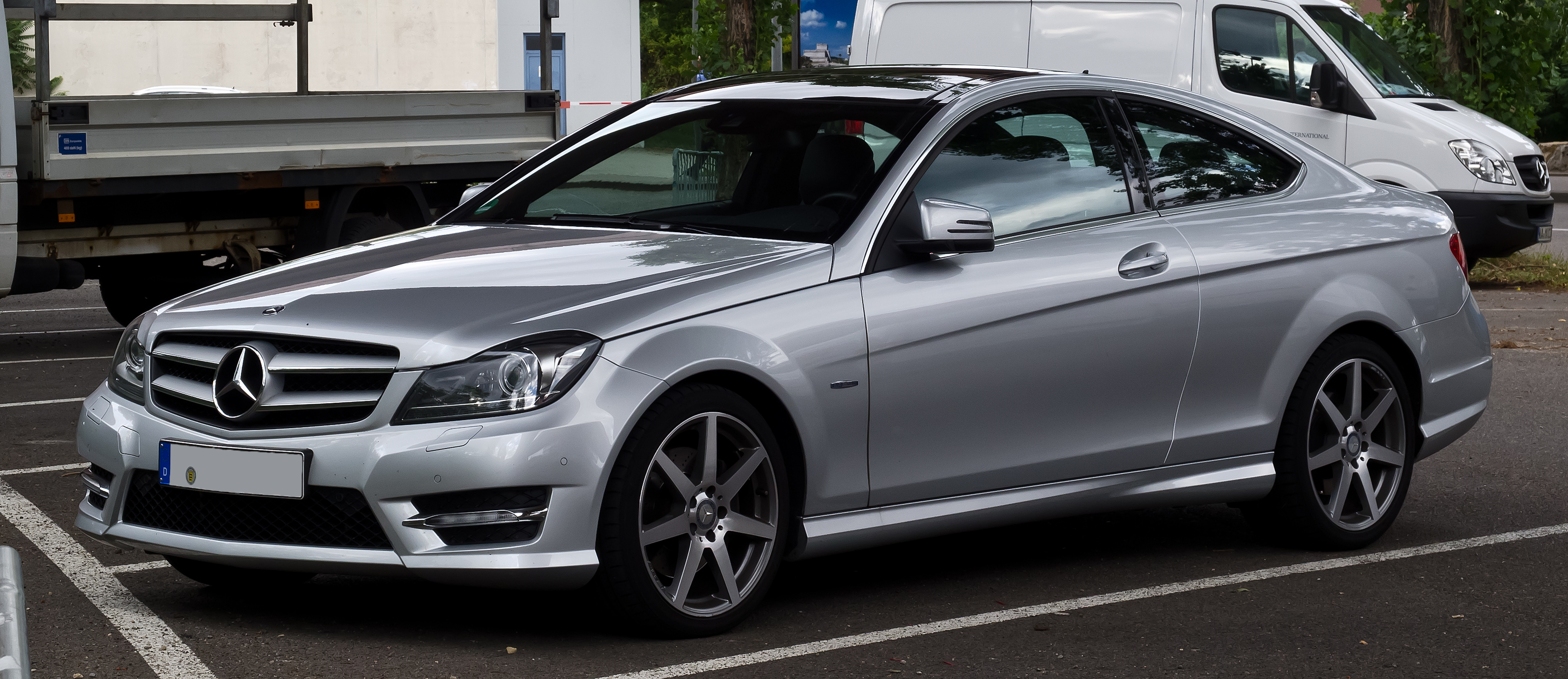
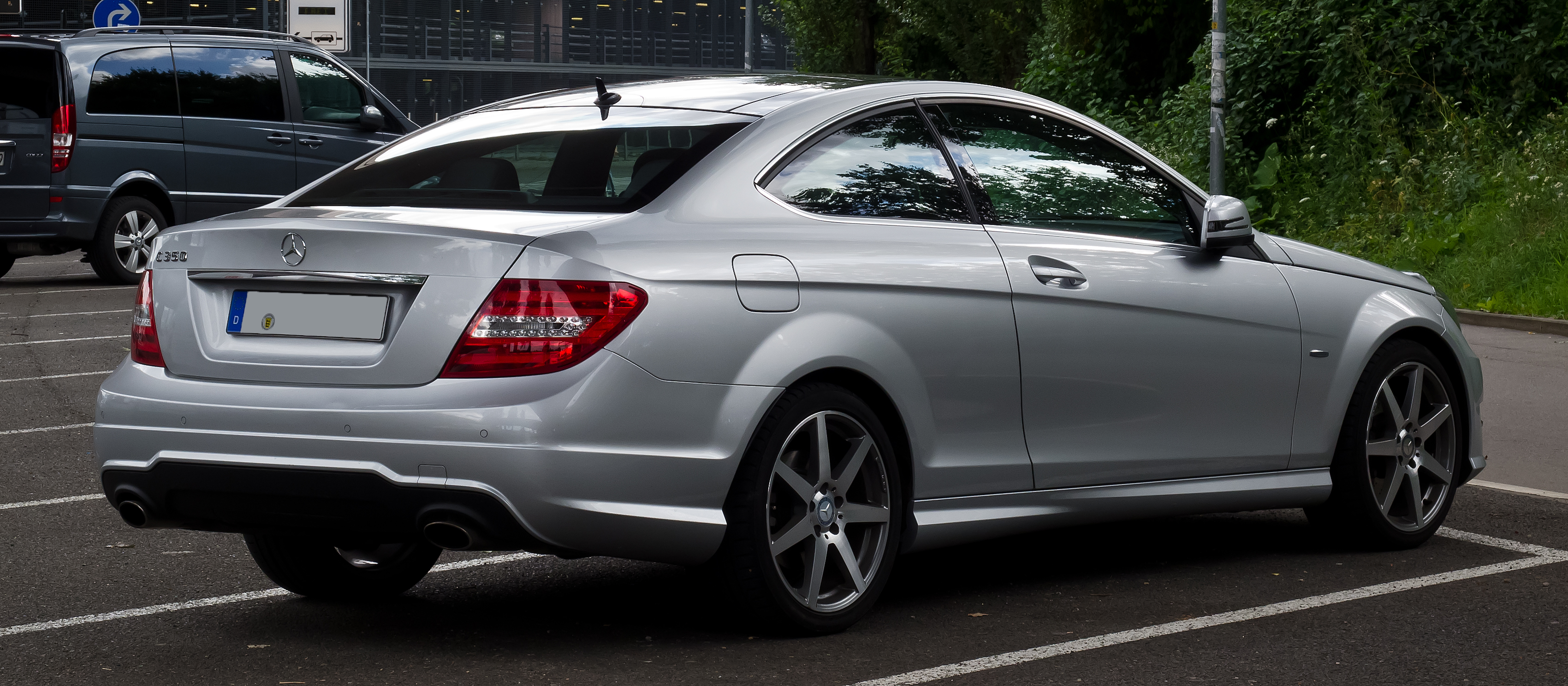
Mercedes-Benz C 350 BlueEfficiency coupé

After the launch of the CLC-Class in January 2008, development and design work began on a replacement. On 23 October 2008, a German design patent was filed for a conventional two-door coupe of the W204. C-Class Coupé was unveiled at the 2011 Geneva Motor Show. An interesting fact to note is that since this is the first real C-Class coupe (not a shortened version like the SportCoupe and CLC-Class), it is fundamentally very similar to the C207 E-Class Coupe which itself is based on the C-Class underpinnings, just like the CLK-Class it replaced.

European models went on sale in June 2011. Initial models included the C 180 BlueEfficiency, C 250 BlueEfficiency, C 350 BlueEfficiency, C 220 CDI BlueEfficiency and the C 250 CDI BlueEfficiency. US models went on sale in September 2011, which included C 250, C 350, and C 63 AMG. In 2012, the C 200 BlueEfficiency was added to the C-Class line-up.

=== C-Class 125!Edition (2011) ===
The C-Class 125!Edition is a special version of the C-Class commemorating the 125th anniversary of the automobile invention by Karl Benz.

The C 200 CGI BlueEfficiency Avantgarde 125!Edition includes 17-inch AMG twin spoke sport aluminium wheels, drilled bench rated brake discs (on the front) with Mercedes-Benz logo on the brake calipers, leather sports seats at the front, leather upholstered 3-spoke steering wheel, stainless steel pedals and sports suspension as standard equipment.

The C 200 CGI BlueEfficiency 125!Edition includes LED daytime running headlamps with intelligent light system along with headlong washers and 8-way adjustable power seats at the front.

The C 250 CGI BlueEfficiency Avantgarde 125!Edition includes 18-inch AMG twin spoke sport aluminium wheels, drilled bench rated disc (at the front) with Mercedes-Benz logo on the brake calipers, leather sports seat at the front, leather upholstered 3-spoke steering wheel, stainless steel pedals and sports suspension as standard equipment.

Japanese versions were sold in limited quantity (650 units in total) which included the C 200 CGI BlueEfficiency Avantgarde 125!Edition (380 units produced in Saloon/Estate bodystyles), C 200 CGI BlueEfficiency 125!Edition (250 units produced in Saloon/Estate bodystyles) and the C 250 CGI BlueEfficiency Avantgarde 125!Edition (20 units produced in Saloon/Estate bodystyles).

=== AMG models ===
==== C 63 AMG (2011–2015) ====
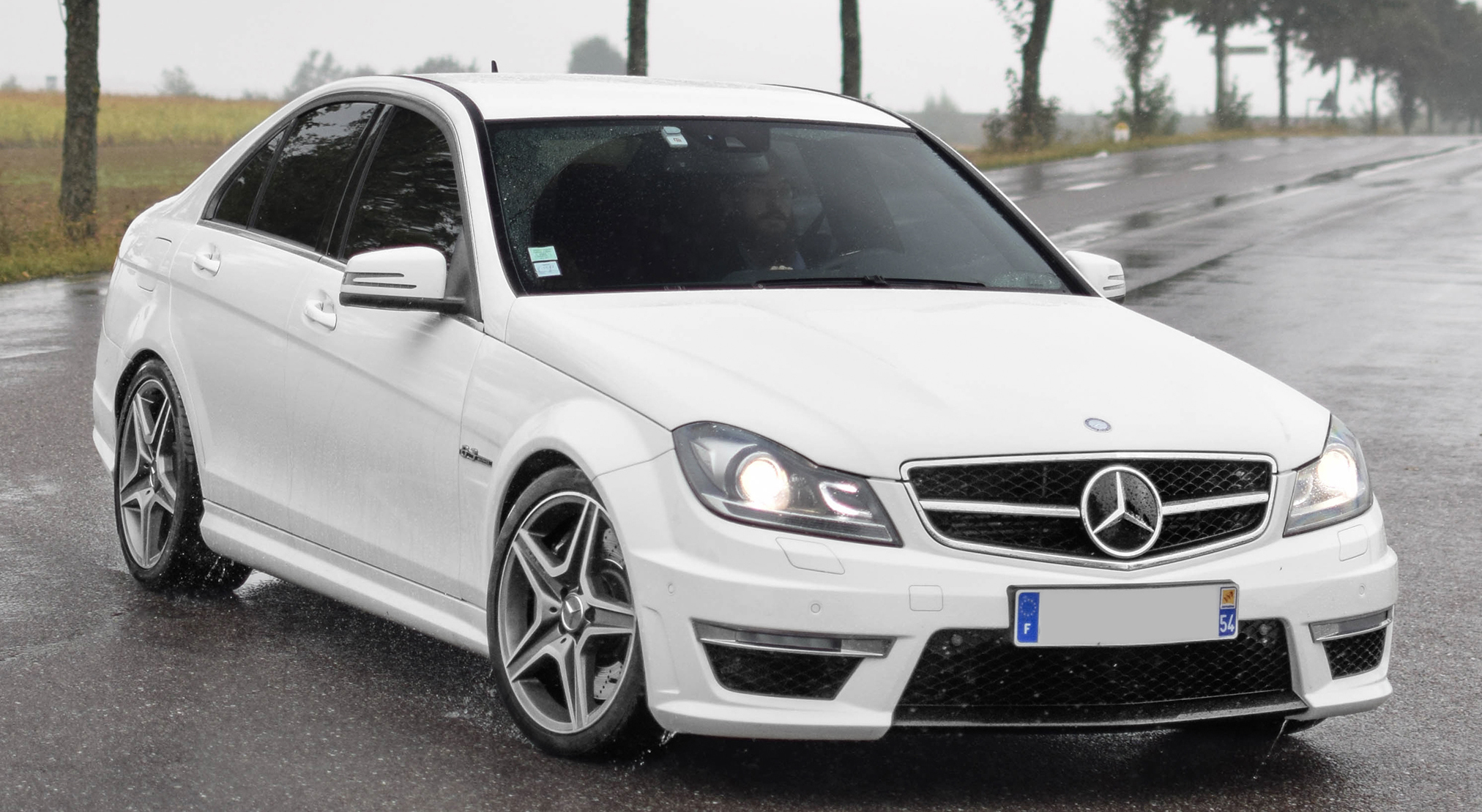

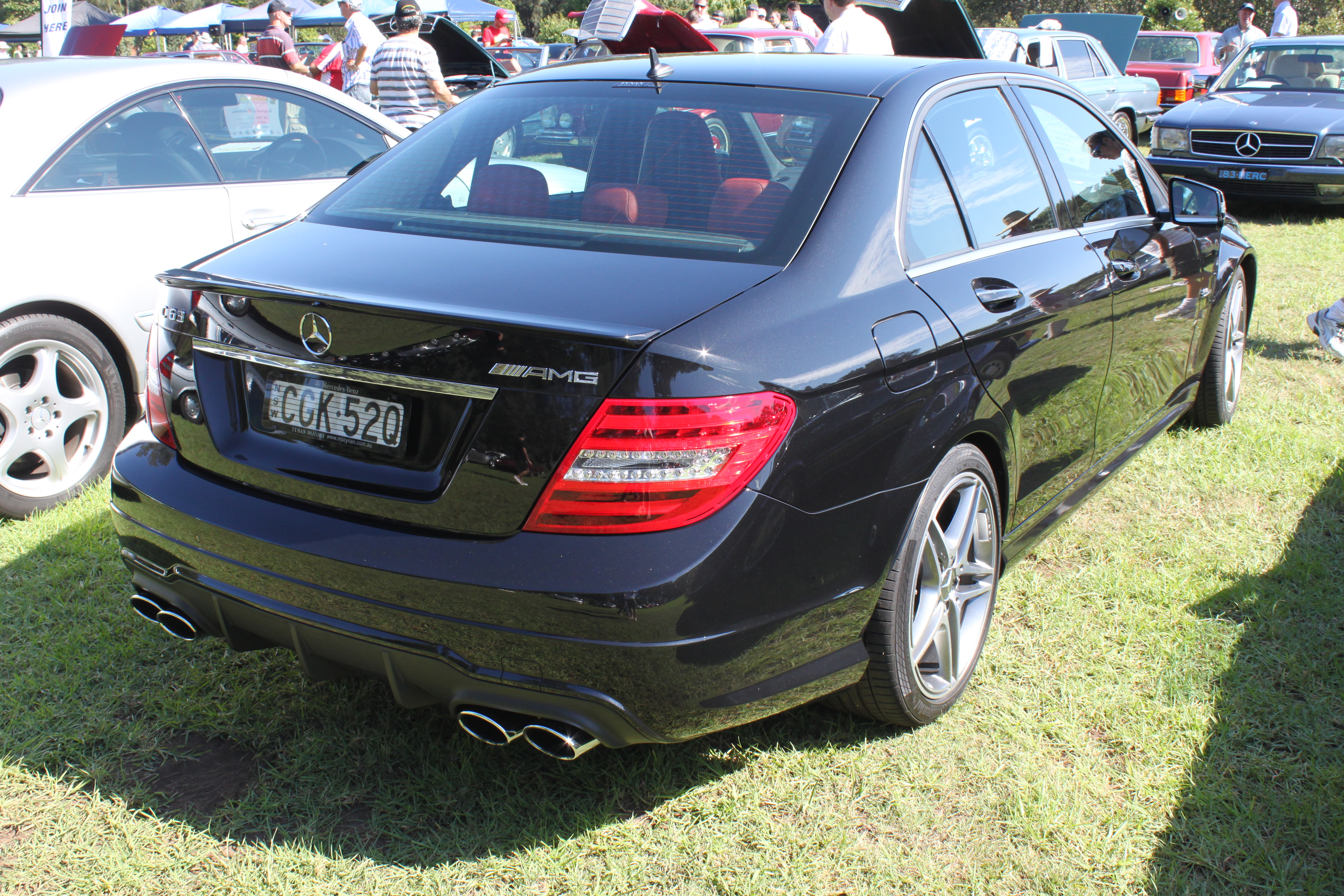
Mercedes-Benz C 63 AMG (post-facelift)

The facelifted C 63 AMG includes the AMG SPEEDSHIFT MCT transmission shared with the SL 63 AMG, replacing the 7G-Tronic automatic transmission with AMG SpeedShift. Other new features include 5 twin-spoke AMG light-alloy wheels painted in titanium grey, 235/40 R 18 front and 255/35 R 18 rear tyres, all-colour three-dimensional TFT display in the middle of the redesigned speedometer, three-spoke AMG performance steering wheel shared with the CLS 63 AMG, aluminium shift paddles with manual gear selection and optional designo leather upholstery. The face-lift also brought a Coupé variant in the C 63 lineage.

The AMG Performance package includes increased engine power output to 487 PS (358 kW; 480 hp) at 6,800 rpm and 600 N⋅m (443 lb⋅ft) at 5,000 rpm. Performance figures include a 0–100 km/h (62 mph) acceleration time of 4.4 seconds (4.5 seconds for the state version) and a top speed of 267 km/h (166 mph). Other features include composite front brake discs and red painted brake calipers, carbon-fibre lip spoiler on the boot lid (Saloon) and the AMG performance steering wheel upholstered in Nappa leather with an Alcantara grip area.

The exclusive Edition 1 model includes AMG sports seats, door centre panels and armrests upholstered in black designo leather with contrasting porcelain seams on the sports seats, porcelain piano-lacquer trim, AMG sports steering wheel upholstered in two-tone Nappa leather and AMG multi-spoke light-alloy wheels painted in matt black.

Sales of the Saloon and Estate models began in July 2011. Coupé models went on sale in July 2011. Japanese versions of the Saloon, Estate, Coupé went on sale in mid-2011. The Taiwanese version of C 63 Coupé went on sale in limited quantity (10 units produced).

===== C 63 AMG Coupé Black Series (2011–2013) =====
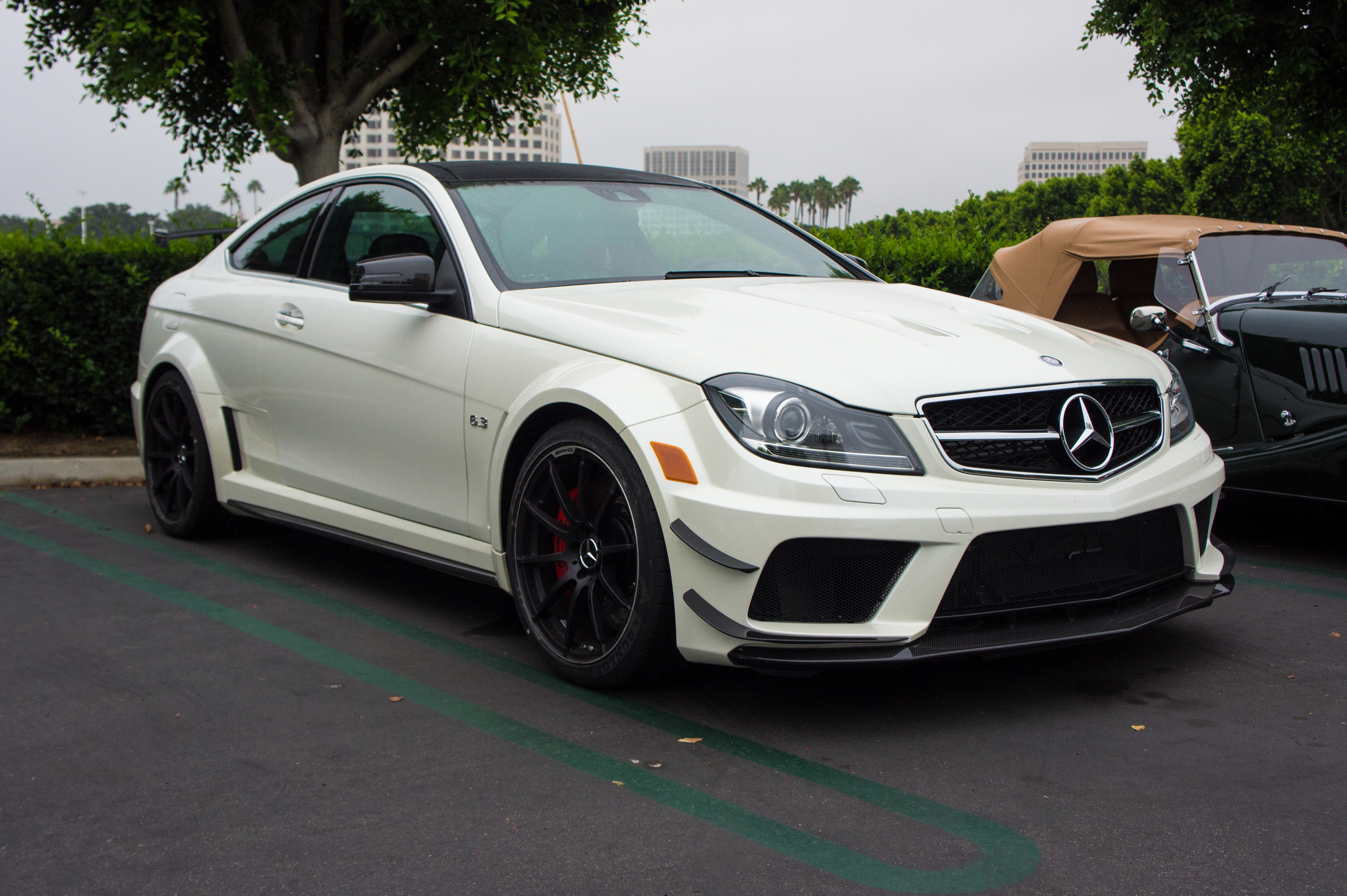

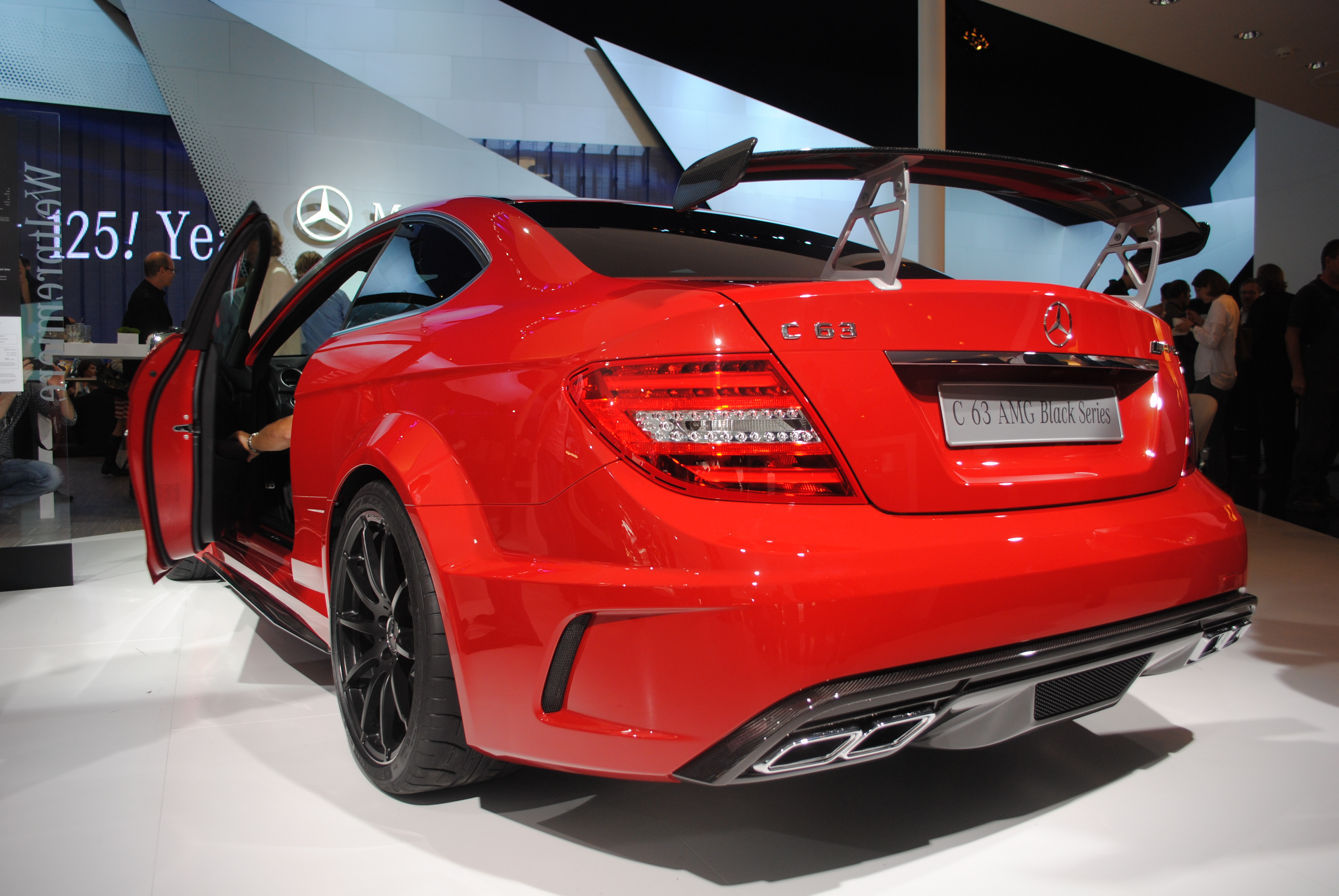
Mercedes-Benz C 63 AMG Black Series

Available only in Coupé bodystyle, the C 63 AMG Black Series includes a modified version of C 63 AMG M156 V8 engine now generating a maximum power output of 517 PS (380 kW; 510 bhp) at 6,800 rpm and 620 N⋅m (457 lb⋅ft) of torque at 5,000 rpm. Performance figures include a 0–100 km/h (62 mph) acceleration time of 4.2 seconds and a top speed of 300 km/h (186 mph). Other notable features include 255/35 ZR 19 and 285/30 ZR 19 tyres, black diffuser insert shared with the SLS AMG GT3, twin tailpipes finished in chrome, AMG adjustable sports coilover suspension developed by KW with AMG rear axle differential lock, three-stage ESP, two AMG sports bucket seats, black DINAMICA microfibre upholstery on the centre panels of the seats and doors, omission of the rear bench seat (single rear seats available as option), AMG performance steering wheel upholstered in either Nappa leather or the Dinamica microfibre, steering wheel rim having flattened top and bottom sections along with aluminium shift paddles on the steering column for manual gear changes, red seat belts and red contrasting top stitching on the steering wheel, on the seats, door centre panels, armrests, on the doors, the centre console and on the shift lever gaiter along with three autonomous round dials has a three-dimensional TFT colour display.

The AMG Track Package includes 255/35 R 19 front and 285/30 R 19 rear sports tyres from Dunlop, active rear-axle transmission cooling with radiator in the rear apron.

The AMG Aerodynamics package includes carbon fibre flics on front apron, carbon-fibre functionally tuned front splitter and a fixed carbon-fibre rear aerofoil with an adjustable blade. China and US models went on sale in March 2012.

Sales of Japanese version began in October 2011 in limited quantities (50 units produced), with delivery began in the Spring of 2012. Mercedes initially planned to build only 650 units, but after the sales success 800 units were produced.

===== C 63 AMG Coupé Performance Studio Taiwan Edition (2011) =====
C 63 AMG Coupé Performance Studio Taiwan Edition is a limited version of C 63 AMG Coupé for the Taiwanese market. Notable features included designo magno night black body colour, AMG 19-inch alloy wheels finished in matte black, AMG carbon fibre interior trim, black leather seats with red piping, AMG steering wheel in black suede and red stitching, AMG floor mat with red trim, and a 'Taiwan Edition' laser-etched sill plate with red AMG logo.

===== C 63 AMG Performance Studio Edition (2012–2015) =====
The C 63 AMG Performance Studio Edition went on sale in May 2012, with delivery beginning in November 2012. It is a special version of the C 63 AMG saloon with the AMG Performance Package as standard built specification for the Japanese market. Notable features included designo magno night black body colour, designo classic red interior upholstery, AMG carbon-fibre interior trim, 19-inch AMG multi-spoke forged alloy wheels finished in matte black and fine opal, AMG performance studio leather package (front seats upholstered in designo classic red leather with black stitching, embossed AMG emblem on the headrests, AMG performance steering wheel in designo classic red or two-tone designo black leather, Nappa leather on the dashboard and upper panel and front seat arm rest and shift selector upholstered in designo black leather with red stitching, handcrafted AMG floor mats made from designo classic red Nappa leather and AMG door handles), AMG performance media and the Harman Kardon 7-speaker audio system.

===== C-Class Coupé Sport, AMG Plus Sports package (2012) =====
Available on the C 220, C 250 Sport and the C 250 CDI Sport, the C-Class Coupé Sport includes following notable features:

- AMG Plus Sports package
- Black exterior mirrors
- AMG sports suspension with spring and damper setup for optimised lateral dynamics plus modified camber and bearings
- Sports braking system with larger brake discs
- Speed-sensitive sports steering with more direct ratio
- Sports exhaust system, with sound generator in the exhaust system in the case of the C 250 CDI Sport
- Engine management with more responsive accelerator mapping
- A more sporty transmission configuration in S and M mode, with shorter shift times, double-declutch function and active downshift when braking

The AMG Plus Sports package includes following features:

- AMG 7-twin-spoke light-alloy wheels painted in high-gloss black with high-sheen finish, 225/40 R 18 (at the front) and 255/35 R 18 (at the rear) tyres
- AMG body kit including a front apron, side sill panels and rear apron
- AMG lip spoiler
- Sports seats upholstered black ARTICO synthetic leather or Dinamica microfibre with red contrasting topstitching
- Door centre panels upholstered in black Dinamica microfibre
- 3-spoke multifunction sports steering wheel with flattened lower section and red contrasting topstitching
- Designo leather seat belts in red (deselectable option)
- Pedals finished in brushed stainless steel with rubber studs
- Red contrasting topstitching on selector lever, centre console armrest and door panels
- AMG floor mats with red edging band

The C-Class Coupé Sport went on sale in June 2012.

===== C 63 AMG Coupé Black Series Performance Studio Edition (2011–2013) =====
The C 63 AMG Coupé Black Series Performance Studio Edition is a limited (20 units made) version of C 63 AMG Coupé Black Series made for the Japanese market. Notable features included matte black exterior parts, designo magno cashmere white interior trim with AMG Black Series logo, AMG door lock pin with AMG logo, AMG shift knob with AMG Affalterbach emblem, handcrafted AMG floor mats with AMG logo, 'AMG Performance Studio' side decal included as a no-cost option, matte black 19-inch AMG 10-spoke forged alloy wheels, AMG aerodynamic package which included carbon-fibre flicks, carbon-fibre front splitter and a carbon-fibre rear wing, AMG sport bucket seats upholstered in either Dinamica microfibre or leather, AMG performance steering wheel upholstered in Dinamica microfibre, AMG performance media, AMG parameter steering, AMG enhanced brake system, front spoiler, side skirt, rear skirt, ABS, AMG diffuser and the AMG emblem with AMG Black Series logo.

===== C 63 AMG Edition 507 (2013–2015) =====
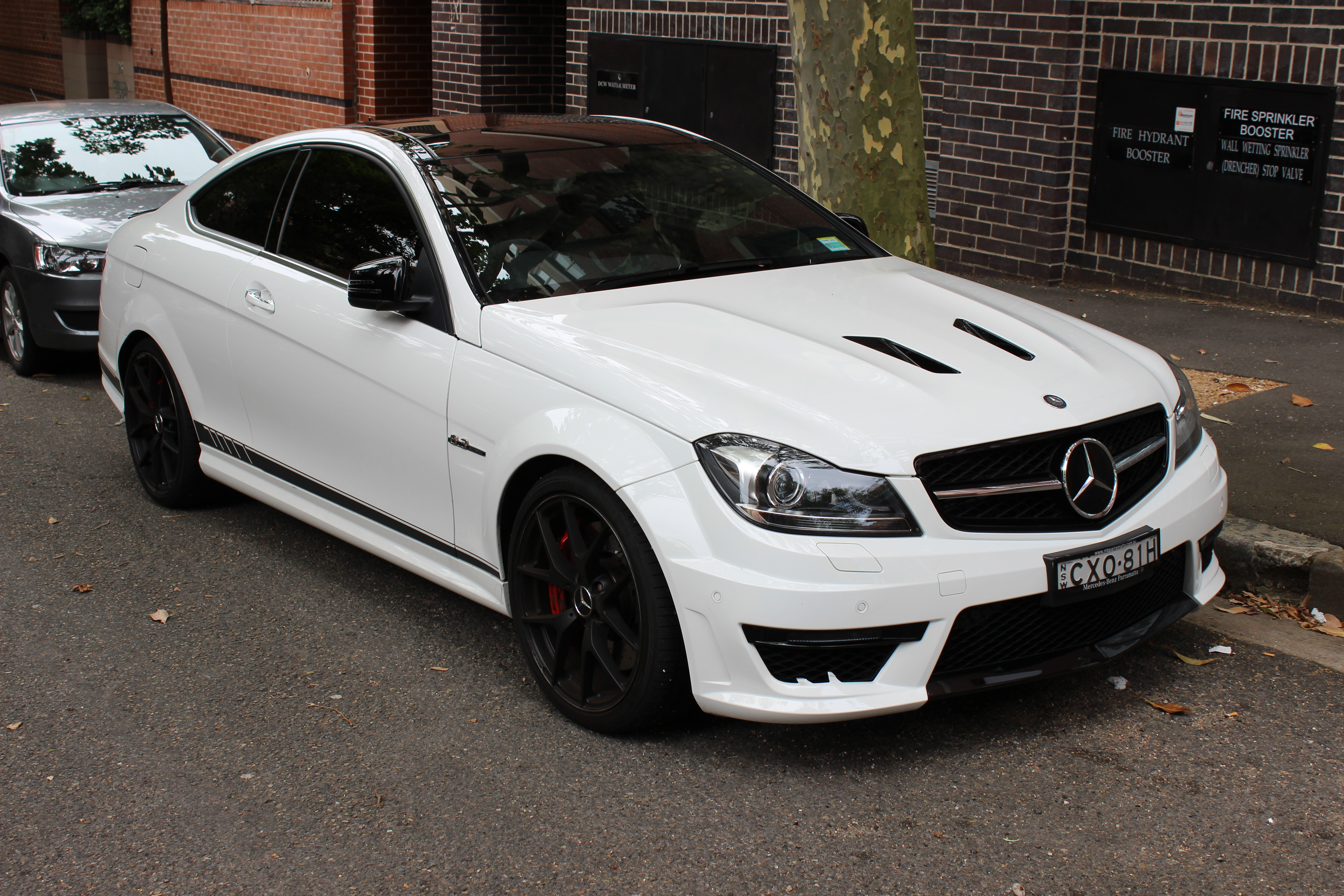
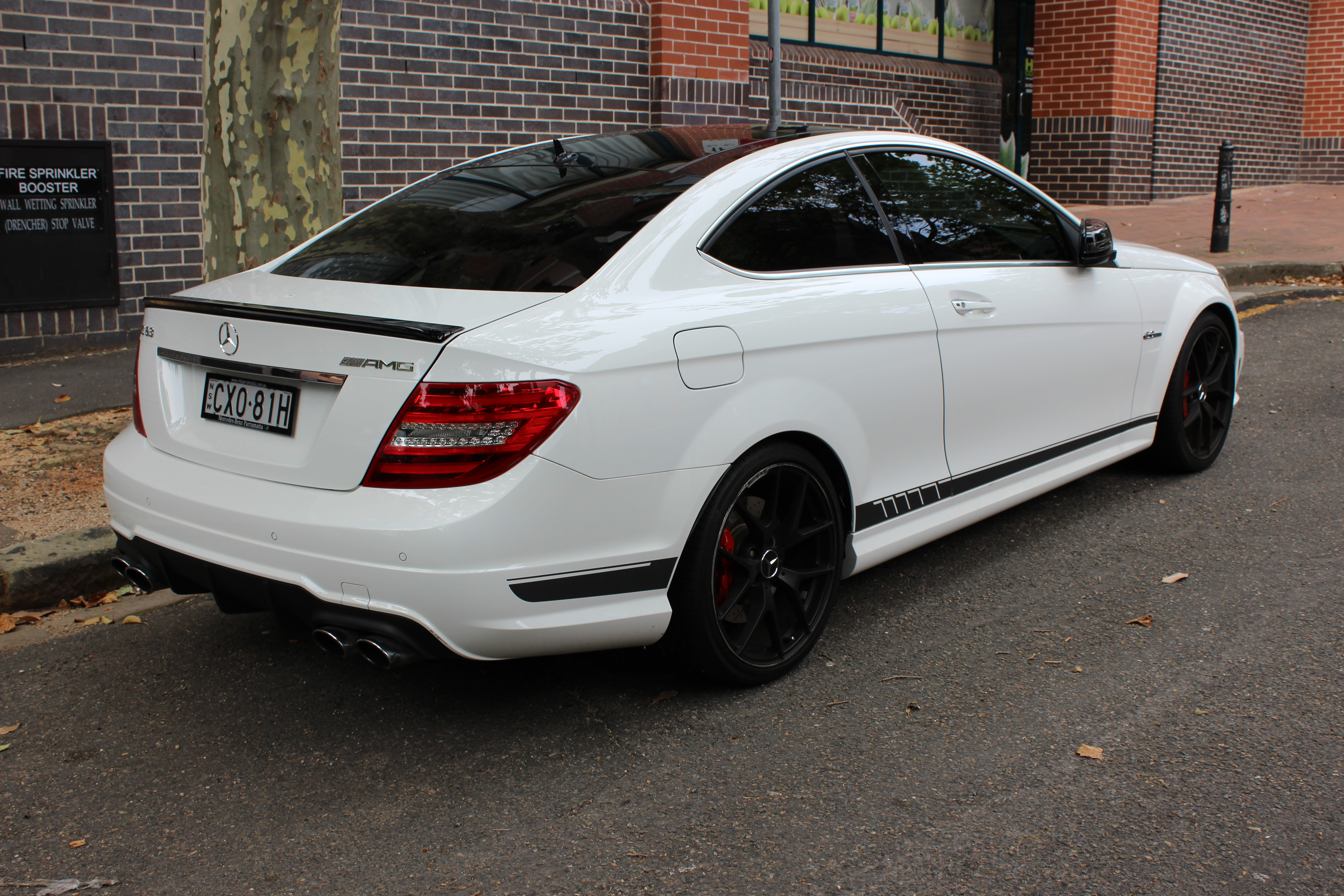
Mercedes-Benz C 63 AMG Edition 507

Available in Saloon, Coupé, Estate bodystyles, the Edition 507 is a special version of C 63 AMG with increased engine power to 507 PS (373 kW; 500 hp) at 6,800 rpm and 610 N⋅m (450 lb⋅ft) at 5,200 rpm along with an increased top speed of 287 km/h (178 mph). Notable features include a bonnet shared with the C 63 AMG Black Series, AMG light-alloy cross-spoke wheels in titanium grey with a high-sheen finish or matt black with high-sheen rim flanges, 235/35 R 19 front and 255/30 R 19 rear tyres, AMG sports stripes in matt graphite grey above the side sill panels; a lip spoiler on the boot lid (Saloon and Coupé only), exterior mirror housings, black surrounds on the radiator grille and daytime running lights in high-gloss black; darkened headlamps, optional designo magno platinum body colour, 360 x 36 mm composite front brake discs, 6-piston aluminium fixed front callipers, 4-piston fixed rear callipers, choice of 3 interior upholstery types (porcelain designo leather or Dinamica microfibre with light-coloured contrasting topstitching, black designo leather or Dinamica microfibre with light-coloured contrasting topstitching, black designo leather), AMG Performance steering wheel upholstered in Alcantara with light-coloured contrasting stitching and a 12-o'clock marking, selector lever of the AMG SPEEDSHIFT MCT 7-speed sports transmission in upholstered in Dinamica microfibre with the AMG badge, steering wheel and selector lever gaiter with light-coloured contrasting stitching, AMG instrument cluster with red applications, trim in high-gloss black piano lacquer and the "Edition 507" badge on the trim on the front passenger side.

The AMG Performance Studio options include the following features:

- AMG door sill panels, illuminated in white featuring LED technology
- AMG floor mats
- AMG rear axle locking differential
- AMG 5-spoke light-alloy wheels, painted in titanium grey and with a high-sheen finish, with tyres in sizes 235/40 R 18 (front) and 255/35 R 18 (rear)
- AMG Performance suspension
- AMG Performance Media
- AMG carbon-fibre/high gloss black piano lacquer-look trim
- Extended appointments in designo black leather comprising: upper part of dashboard, beltlines in the doors finished in designo black leather
- Collection from the AMG Customer Center in Affalterbach (for Germany)

The C 63 AMG "Edition 507" was unveiled at the 2013 Geneva Motor Show, with introduction in the market scheduled in April 2013 (June 2013 for the German market).

The US models were sold as 2014 model year cars in Saloon and Coupé bodystyles, replacing the AMG Development Package. The car also includes voucher for a driver training session at the AMG Driving Academy.

== Specifications ==
=== Body style (production) ===
Petrol models
Model	Saloon	Estate	Coupé
C 180 (1.8-litre)	2011–2012	2011–2012	2011–2012
C 180 (1.6-litre)	2012–	2012–	2012–
C 200	2011–	2011–	2012–
C 250	2011–	2011–	2011–
C 250 Sport	N/A	N/A	2012–
C 300 4Matic	2012–2015	N/A	N/A
C 350 BlueEfficiency	2011–2015	2011–2015	2011–2015
C 350 4Matic BlueEfficiency	2011–2015	N/A	N/A
C 63 AMG	2008–2011	2011–2015	2011–2015
C 63 AMG Black Series	N/A	N/A	2011–2015
C 63 AMG "Edition 507"	2013–2015	2013–2015	2013–2015

Diesel models
Model	Saloon	Estate	Coupé
C 180 CDI BlueEfficiency	2011–2015	2011–2015	N/A
C 200 CDI BlueEfficiency	2011–2015	2011–2015	N/A
C 220 CDI BlueEfficiency	2011–2015	2011–2015	2011–2015
C 220 CDI BlueEfficiency Edition	2012–2015	2012–2015	N/A
C 250 CDI BlueEfficiency	2011–2015	2011–2015	2011–2015
C 250 CDI 4Matic BlueEfficiency	2011–2015	2011–2015	N/A
C 250 Sport	N/A	N/A	2012–
C 300 CDI 4Matic BlueEfficiency	2011–2015	2011–2015	N/A
C 350 CDI BlueEfficiency	2011–2015	2011–2015	N/A

=== Engines ===
Petrol engines
Model	Years	Type	Power, torque at rpm
C 180 BlueEFFICIENCY	2011–2012	1,796 cc (110 cu in) 16V I4 turbo (M 271 DE 18 AL red.)	156 PS (115 kW; 154 hp) at 5,000, 250 N⋅m (184 lb⋅ft) at 1,600
C 180 BlueEFFICIENCY	2012–2014	1,595 cc (97 cu in) 16V I4 turbo (M 274 DE 16 AL)	156 PS (115 kW; 154 hp) at 5,000, 250 N⋅m (184 lb⋅ft) at 1,250–4,000
C 200 BlueEFFICIENCY	2011–2014	1,796 cc (110 cu in) 16V I4 turbo (M 271 DE 18 AL)	184 PS (135 kW; 181 hp) at 5,250, 270 N⋅m (199 lb⋅ft) at 1,800
C 250 BlueEFFICIENCY	2011–2015	1,796 cc (110 cu in) 16V I4 turbo (M 271 DE 18 AL)	204 PS (150 kW; 201 hp) at 5,500, 310 N⋅m (229 lb⋅ft) at 2,000–4,300
C 250 Sport	2012–2015	1,796 cc (110 cu in) 16V I4 turbo (M 271 DE 18 AL)	204 PS (150 kW; 201 hp) at 5,500, 310 N⋅m (229 lb⋅ft) at 2,300–4,300
C 300 4MATIC (Canada)	2012–2014	3,498 cc (213 cu in) 24V V6 (M 276 DE 35 red.)	251 PS (185 kW; 248 hp) at 6,500, 340 N⋅m (251 lb⋅ft) at 3,400–4,500
C 300 4MATIC (USA)	2012–2014	3,498 cc (213 cu in) 24V V6 (M 276 DE 35 red.)	251 PS (185 kW; 248 hp) at 6,500, 340 N⋅m (251 lb⋅ft) at 3,500–4,500
C 350 BlueEFFICIENCY	2011–2014	3,498 cc (213 cu in) 24V V6 (M 276 DE 35)	306 PS (225 kW; 302 hp) at 6,500, 370 N⋅m (273 lb⋅ft) at 3,500
C 350 (US/Canada)	2012–2014	3,498 cc (213 cu in) 24V V6 (M 276 DE 35)	306 PS (225 kW; 302 hp) at 6,500, 370 N⋅m (273 lb⋅ft) at 3,500–5,250
C 350 4MATIC BlueEFFICIENCY	2011–2014	3,498 cc (213 cu in) 24V V6 (M 276 DE 35)	306 PS (225 kW; 302 hp) at 6,500, 370 N⋅m (273 lb⋅ft) at 3,500
C 350 4MATIC (US/Canada)	2012–2014	3,498 cc (213 cu in) 24V V6 (M 276 DE 35)	306 PS (225 kW; 302 hp) at 6,500, 370 N⋅m (273 lb⋅ft) at 3,500–5,250
C 63 AMG	2011–2015	6,208 cc (379 cu in) 32V V8 (M 156 KE 63)	457 PS (336 kW; 451 hp) at 6,800, 600 N⋅m (443 lb⋅ft) at 5,000 AMG Performance Package: 487 PS (358 kW; 480 hp) at 6,800, 600 N⋅m (443 lb⋅ft) at 5,000
C 63 AMG Coupé Black Series	2011–2015	6,208 cc (379 cu in) 32V V8 (M 156 KE 63)	517 PS (380 kW; 510 hp) at 6,800, 620 N⋅m (457 lb⋅ft) at 5,200
C 63 AMG "Edition 507"	2013–2015	6,208 cc (379 cu in) 32V V8 (M 156 KE 63)	507 PS (373 kW; 500 hp) at 6,800, 610 N⋅m (450 lb⋅ft) at 5,200

Diesel engines
Model	Years	Type	Power, torque at rpm
C 180 CDI BlueEFFICIENCY	2011–2014	2,143 cc (131 cu in) 16V I4 turbo (OM 651 DE 22 LA red.)	120 PS (88 kW; 118 hp) at 2,800–4,600, 300 N⋅m (221 lb⋅ft) at 1,400–2,800
C 200 CDI BlueEFFICIENCY	2011–2014	2,143 cc (131 cu in) 16V I4 turbo (OM 651 DE 22 LA red.)	136 PS (100 kW; 134 hp) at 2,800–3,000, 360 N⋅m (266 lb⋅ft) at 1,600–2,800
C 220 CDI BlueEFFICIENCY	2011–2014	2,143 cc (131 cu in) 16V I4 2-stage turbo (OM 651 DE 22 LA)	170 PS (125 kW; 168 hp) at 3,000–4,200, 400 N⋅m (295 lb⋅ft) at 1,400–2,800
C 220 CDI BlueEFFICIENCY Edition	2012–2014	2,143 cc (131 cu in) 16V I4 2-stage turbo (OM 651 DE 22 LA)	170 PS (125 kW; 168 hp) at 3,000–4,200, 400 N⋅m (295 lb⋅ft) at 1,400–2,800
C 250 CDI BlueEFFICIENCY	2011–2014	2,143 cc (131 cu in) 16V I4 2-stage turbo (OM 651 DE 22 LA)	204 PS (150 kW; 201 hp) at 4,200, 500 N⋅m (369 lb⋅ft) at 1,600–1,800
C 250 CDI 4MATIC BlueEFFICIENCY	2011–2014	2,143 cc (131 cu in) 16V I4 2-stage turbo (OM 651 DE 22 LA)	204 PS (150 kW; 201 hp) at 4,200, 500 N⋅m (369 lb⋅ft) at 1,600–1,800
C 250 CDI Sport	2012–2015	2,143 cc (131 cu in) 16V I4 2-stage turbo (OM 651 DE 22 LA)	204 PS (150 kW; 201 hp) at 4,200, 500 N⋅m (369 lb⋅ft) at 1,600–1,800
C 300 CDI 4MATIC BlueEFFICIENCY	2011–2014	2,987 cc (182 cu in) 24V V6 turbo (OM 642 DE 30 LA)	231 PS (170 kW; 228 hp) at 3,800, 540 N⋅m (398 lb⋅ft) at 1,600
C 350 CDI BlueEFFICIENCY	2011–2014	2,987 cc (182 cu in) 24V V6 turbo (OM 642 LS DE 30 LA)	265 PS (195 kW; 261 hp) at 3,800, 620 N⋅m (457 lb⋅ft) at 1,600–2,400

In 2012, C 180 BlueEFFICIENCY was replaced by 1,595 cc (97 cu in) turbo engine.

C 250 Sport is sold as C 250 Coupe in Canada.

=== Transmissions ===
Petrol engines
Model	Years	Standard	Optional
C 180 BlueEFFICIENCY (M 271)	2011–2014	6-speed manual	7-speed automatic with paddle shifter (7G-TRONIC Plus)
C 180 BlueEFFICIENCY (M 274)	2012–2014	6-speed manual	7-speed automatic with paddle shifter (7G-TRONIC Plus)
C 200 BlueEFFICIENCY	2011–	6-speed manual	7-speed automatic with paddle shifter (7G-TRONIC Plus)
C 250 BlueEFFICIENCY	2011–	7-speed automatic with paddle shifter (7G-TRONIC Plus)	na
C 250 Sport	2012–	7-speed automatic with paddle shifter (7G-TRONIC Plus)	na
C 300 4MATIC	2012–	7-speed automatic with paddle shifter (7G-TRONIC Plus)	na
C 350 BlueEFFICIENCY	2011–	7-speed automatic with paddle shifter (7G-TRONIC Plus)	na
C 350 4MATIC BlueEFFICIENCY	2011–	7-speed automatic with paddle shifter (7G-TRONIC Plus)	na
C 63 AMG	2011–	7-speed automatic (AMG SPEEDSHIFT MCT)	na
C 63 AMG Coupé Black Series	2011–	7-speed automatic (AMG SPEEDSHIFT MCT)	na
C 63 AMG "Edition 507"	2013–	7-speed automatic (AMG SPEEDSHIFT MCT)	na

Diesel engines
Model	Years	Standard	Optional
C 180 CDI BlueEFFICIENCY	2011–	6-speed manual	7-speed automatic (7G-TRONIC Plus)
C 200 CDI BlueEFFICIENCY	2011–	6-speed manual	7-speed automatic with paddle shifter (7G-TRONIC Plus)
C 220 CDI BlueEFFICIENCY	2011–	6-speed manual	7-speed automatic with paddle shifter (7G-TRONIC Plus)
C 220 CDI BlueEFFICIENCY Edition	2012–	6-speed manual	7-speed automatic (7G-TRONIC Plus) (sedan)
C 250 CDI BlueEFFICIENCY	2011–	6-speed manual	7-speed automatic with paddle shifter (7G-TRONIC Plus)
C 250 CDI 4MATIC BlueEFFICIENCY	2011–	7-speed automatic (7G-TRONIC PLUS)	7-speed automatic with paddle shifter (7G-TRONIC Plus)
C 250 CDI Sport	2012–	7-speed automatic with paddle shifter (7G-TRONIC Plus)	na
C 300 CDI 4MATIC BlueEFFICIENCY	2011–	7-speed automatic (7G-TRONIC Plus)	na
C 350 CDI BlueEFFICIENCY	2011–	7-speed automatic (7G-TRONIC Plus)	na

== Marketing ==
As part of the 2011 model year launch campaign, Two 45 and 30-second TV advertisements were made, which take a humorous and cinematographic approach to the C-Class Saloon and Estate models, focusing in particular on the innovative ATTENTION ASSIST system, which detects and provides early warning of the onset of driver drowsiness. The 20-second pre-roll titled 'Souvenir' takes an enjoyable approach to the C-Class Estate's 1,500-litre load capacity. Printed ad features C-Class photographed against an urban backdrop, with the 'living city look' highlights the sportiness and dynamic qualities of the vehicles.

As part of the C-Class Coupé campaign, an interactive web video titled 'Drive & Seek' was released in March 2011, featuring the theft of a work of art, a car chase starring the new C-Class Coupé and the hero agents, who rely on the help of the user, who must stay focused and make split-second decisions in order to capture the thieves and return the painting to its rightful owner. Four short films highlight the C-Class Coupé's top features in terms of agility, design, safety and comfort. The web special was accompanied by cinema-poster-style ads and posters. Print ad campaign started on 11 May, designed to show off the sporty and dynamic qualities and sleek design of the new C-Class Coupé. Three different ad images show the vehicle with a high-gloss finish in palladium silver on a disused air field in Jerez de la Frontera, Spain, where parts of the web thriller were also shot. In the bright midday sun, the Coupé comes across as a shining jewel. Messages such as "More style per hour, "Awe. Inspiring" or "Adrenaline accelerator included" accentuate the vehicle's modern image. The two 45- and 30-second cinema ads also take a humorous approach to the campaign slogan "More glances per hour", which was released on 19 May 2011 serving as sequel to the Drive & Seek, linking back to the bank robbery featured in the film.

A behind the scene video titled Making of C 63 AMG Coupe Fotoshooting was released by Mercedes AMG, featuring C 63 AMG Coupe and a Ducati 848 in matching white.

AMG "Black Series" 50' Marauder Cigarette Boat, a powerboat inspired by C 63 AMG Coupé Black Series and built by Cigarette Racing, was unveiled at the 2012 Miami Boat Show.

== Safety ==
=== Euro NCAP ===
Euro NCAP (pre-2009 testing)
Euro NCAP adult occupant:	5/5 stars
Child occupant:	3/5 stars
Pedestrian:	2/4 stars

Euro NCAP (post-2009 testing)
Adult occupant:	82%
Child occupant:	70%
Pedestrian:	30%

=== IIHS ===
IIHS moderate frontal offset score:	Good
IIHS small frontal offset score:	Poor (2010–12)
IIHS small frontal offset score:	Marginal (2013–15)
IIHS overall side crash test score:	Good
IIHS roof strength score:	Good

=== NHTSA ===
NHTSA crash test ratings (2007)
Frontal driver:	4/5 stars
Frontal passenger:	4/5 stars
Side rear driver:	5/5 stars
Side rear passenger:	5/5 stars
Rollover:	4/5 stars

NHTSA crash test ratings (2011)
Frontal driver:	4/5 stars
Frontal passenger:	2/5 stars
Side driver front seat (male)	5/5 stars
Side passenger rear seat (female):	4/5 stars
Side pole driver seat (female):	4/5 stars
Rollover:	4/5 stars

The C-Class was rated Top Safety Pick 2009 by the Institute for Highway Safety.

The C-Class Coupé earned five stars for occupant protection. The optional PRE-SAFE and PRE-SAFE Brake safety system received the Euro NCAP Advanced prize.

=== ANCAP ===
ANCAP test results Mercedes-Benz C-Class (2007)
Test	Score
Overall	5 /5 stars
Frontal offset	15.16/16
Side impact	16/16
Pole	2/2
Seat belt reminders	3/3
Whiplash protection	Not Assessed
Pedestrian protection	Marginal
Electronic stability control	Standard

ANCAP test results Mercedes-Benz C-Class coupe variants with 4 cylinder diesel engine (2011)
Test	Score
Overall	5 /5 stars
Frontal offset	14.51/16
Side impact	16/16
Pole	2/2
Seat belt reminders	3/3
Whiplash protection	Not Assessed
Pedestrian protection	Adequate
Electronic stability control	Standard
