= Mercedes-Benz CLS-Class (C219) =

Mercedes-Benz CLS (C219)
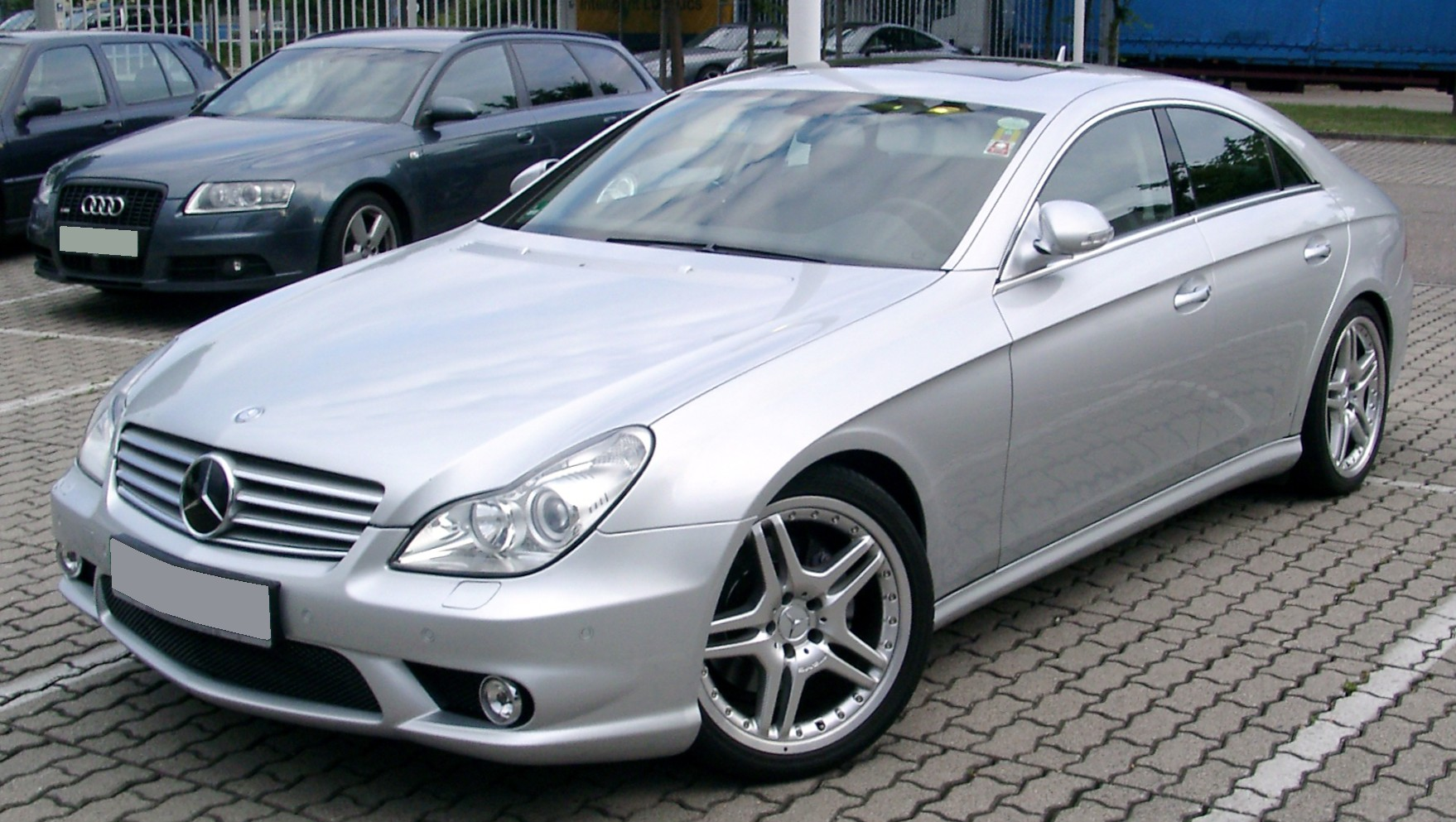

Overview
- Manufacturer: DaimlerChrysler (2003–2007); Daimler AG (2007–2010)
- Production: December 2003 – August 2010
- Model years: 2004-2010
- Assembly: Germany: Sindelfingen
- Designer: Michael Fink (2001); Peter Arcadipane (initial)

Body and chassis
- Class: Executive (E)
- Body style: 4-door coupe
- Layout: FR
- Related: Mercedes-Benz E-Class (W211)

Powertrain
- Engine: petrol: 3.0 L M272 V6; 3.5 L M272 V6; 5.0 L M113 V8; 5.4 L M113 supercharged V8; 5.5 L M273 V8; 6.2 L M156 V8; diesel: 3.0 L OM642 turbo V6
- Transmission: 5-speed 5G-Tronic automatic; 7-speed 7G-Tronic automatic

Dimensions
- Wheelbase: 2,854 mm (112.4 in)
- Length: 4,913 mm (193.4 in); 4,917 mm (193.6 in) (facelift)
- Width: 1,873 mm (73.7 in)
- Height: 1,390–1,403 mm (54.7–55.2 in); 1,415–1,430 mm (55.7–56.3 in) (facelift)
- Kerb weight: 1,660–1,870 kg (3,660–4,123 lb)

Chronology
- Successor: Mercedes-Benz CLS-Class (C218)

The C219 Mercedes-Benz CLS-Class is the first generation of the CLS-Class range of four-door coupe which features a fastback body style by Mercedes-Benz, and was produced between 2003 and 2010.

The CLS-Class has only four seats and is marketed by Mercedes as a four-door coupé. It was the first model globally to introduce this four-door coupe style and VW followed with the Volkswagen CC model in 2008 and the Porsche Panamera and Audi A7 in 2009.

The car is less practical than the W211 E-Class that it is based on, with less legroom, headroom, and boot space. The CLS-Class is priced above the E-Class, but below the S-Class in the Mercedes model range. The production of the C219 series totalled only 170,000 units globally throughout its six year production run. It was replaced by the Mercedes-Benz CLS-Class (C218) in 2011.

== Development and launch ==
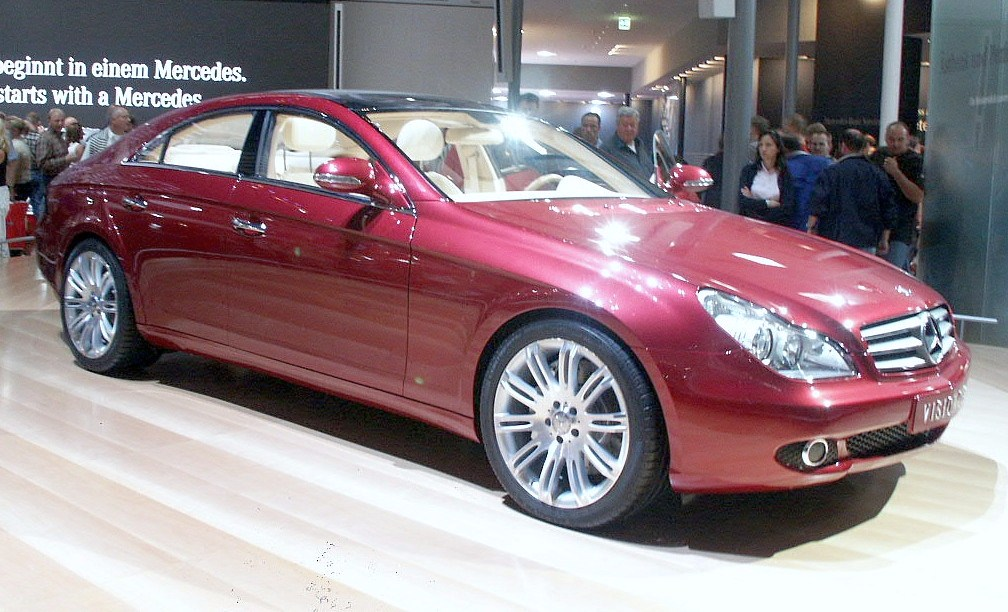
Mercedes-Benz Vision CLS concept

The C219 CLS-Class is based on the Vision CLS concept that was unveiled at the 2003 Frankfurt International Motor Show. The design combined the roof-line of a coupé onto the body of a four-door chassis leading to a fastback vehicle. It featured new technologies such as cornering lights, an electrohydraulic braking system (Sensotronic Brake Control), a seven-speed (7G-Tronic) automatic transmission, and a turbo-diesel engine rated at 197 kW (268 PS; 264 hp) and 560 N⋅m (413 lb⋅ft).

The production version of the C219 CLS-Class was based on the W211 E-Class platform, and shares major components including the engines, transmissions and an identical wheelbase of 2,854 mm (112 in). The car is 95 mm (4 in) longer, 51 mm (2 in) wider, and 27 mm (1 in) lower in comparison, and features, according to Mercedes, a 30% stiffer suspension setup and faster steering.

Design patents were filed on July 24, 2002. The production version CLS 500 debuted at the 2004 New York International Auto Show.

== Equipment ==
Standard equipment includes heated automatically dimming mirrors, rain-sensing wipers, and an automatic climate control system. The CLS-Class comes with front and side airbags, and a smart sensor system connected to the seatbelts and airbags that can detect and react to an accident. Available options include: self-cleaning bi-xenon HID headlamps, radar-guided cruise control, keyless go, GPS navigation, Sensotronic Brake Control and AirMATIC air suspension that can be controlled from the driver and can be raised or lowered by 76 mm (3 in).

== Models ==
=== Petrol engines ===
Model	Years	Engine	Power	Torque	0–100 km/h (0–62 mph)
CLS 280	2008–2009	M272 E30; 3.0 L V6	170 kW (231 PS; 228 hp) @ 6,000 rpm	300 N⋅m (221 lb⋅ft) @ 2,500–5,000 rpm	7.7 s
CLS 300	2009–2010	M272 E30; 3.0 L V6	170 kW (231 PS; 228 hp) @ 6,000 rpm	300 N⋅m (221 lb⋅ft) @ 2,500–5,000 rpm	7.7 s
CLS 350	2004–2006	M272 E35; 3.5 L V6	200 kW (272 PS; 268 hp) @ 6,000 rpm	350 N⋅m (258 lb⋅ft) @ 2,400–5,000 rpm	6.9 s
CLS 350 CGI	2006–2010	M272 DE35; 3.5 L V6	215 kW (292 PS; 288 hp) @ 6,400 rpm	365 N⋅m (269 lb⋅ft) @ 3,000–5,100 rpm	6.7 s
CLS 500	2004–2006	M113 E50; 5.0 L V8	225 kW (306 PS; 302 hp) @ 5,600 rpm	460 N⋅m (339 lb⋅ft) @ 2,700–4,250 rpm	6.1 s
CLS 500 / CLS 550	2007–2010	M273 E55; 5.5 L V8	285 kW (387 PS; 382 hp) @ 6,000 rpm	530 N⋅m (391 lb⋅ft) @ 2,800–4,800 rpm	5.4 s
CLS 55 AMG	2004–2006	M113 E55 AMG; 5.4 L V8 supercharged	350 kW (476 PS; 469 hp) @ 6,100 rpm	700 N⋅m (516 lb⋅ft) @ 2,650–4,500 rpm	4.2 s
CLS 63 AMG	2006–2010	M156 E63; 6.2 L V8	378 kW (514 PS; 507 hp) @ 6,800 rpm	630 N⋅m (465 lb⋅ft) @ 5,200 rpm	4.1 s

=== Diesel engines ===
Model	Years	Engine	Power	Torque	0–100 km/h (0–62 mph)
CLS 320 CDI	2005–2010	OM642 DE30; 3.0 L V6 turbo	165 kW (224 PS; 221 hp) @ 3,800 rpm	510 N⋅m (376 lb⋅ft) @ 1,600–2,800 rpm	7.0 s
CLS 350 CDI	2007–2010	OM642 DE30; 3.0 L V6 turbo	165 kW (224 PS; 221 hp) @ 3,800 rpm	540 N⋅m (398 lb⋅ft) @ 1,600–2,400 rpm	7.0 s
CLS 350 CDI; Grand Edition	2009	OM642 DE30; 3.0 L V6 turbo	203 kW (276 PS; 272 hp) @ 3,800 rpm	590 N⋅m (435 lb⋅ft) @ 1,600 rpm	6.5 s

== Special models ==
=== CLS 55 AMG ===
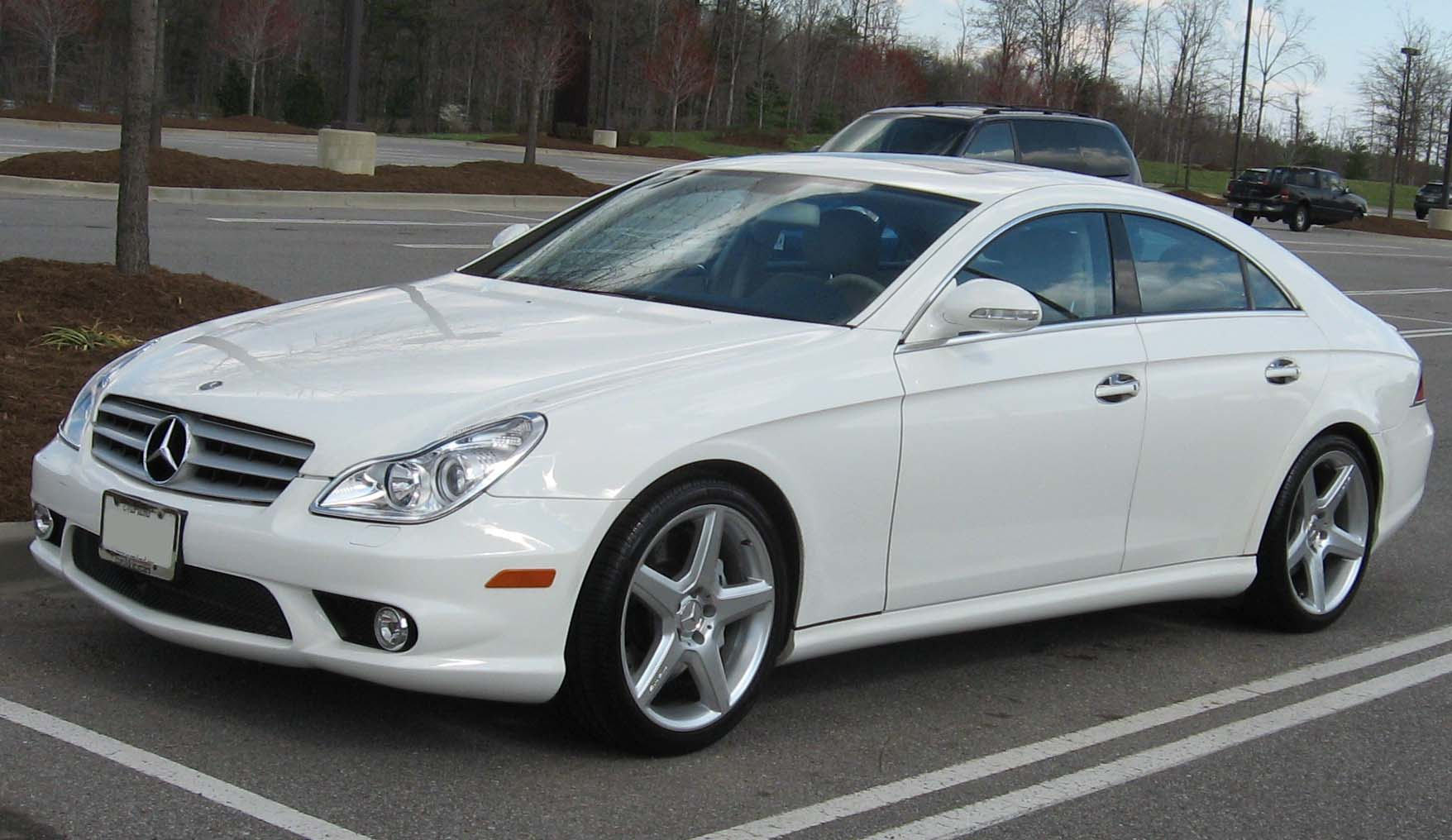
CLS 55 AMG

The CLS 55 AMG is a high-performance variant of the CLS-Class featuring a 5.4-litre supercharged V8 producing 350 kW (476 PS; 469 hp) and 700 N⋅m (516 lb⋅ft), and was unveiled at the Paris Motor Show in 2004. Compared to the standard model, the CLS 55 AMG has larger 360 mm brake discs with eight-piston callipers from the SL55 AMG, wider 18-inch alloy wheels, revised stiffer AirMATIC air suspension with multiple driving modes, AMG bodywork, and a five-speed automatic transmission.

=== CLS 63 AMG ===
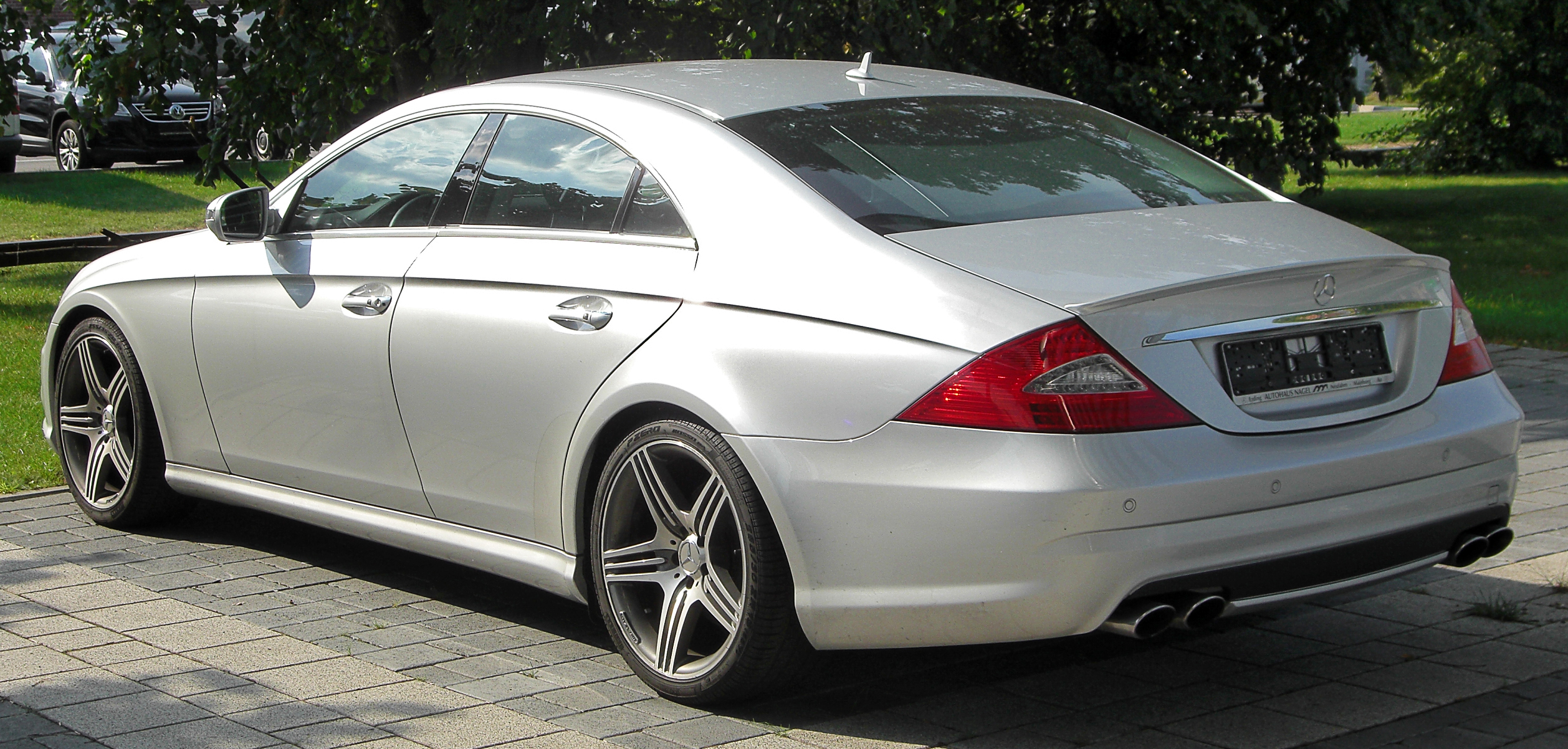
CLS 63 AMG (facelift)

The CLS 63 AMG was introduced in 2006, as the successor to the CLS 55 AMG. The car is powered by the then new Mercedes M156 engine that produces 383 kW (521 PS; 514 hp) and 630 N⋅m (465 lb⋅ft); with less torque than before in order to accommodate the new AMG Speedshift Plus 7G-Tronic seven-speed transmission, instead of the previous five-speed automatic. The new transmission includes a comfort, sport, and manual mode that allows for the manual changing of gears. Sport mode have shift speeds that are almost 30% faster than comfort and 50% faster than manual. The car also features an updated instrument cluster and alloy-wheel design.

The CLS 63 AMG had a 6,208 cc (6.208 L) V8 petrol engine, with 383 kW (521 PS; 514 hp) and 630 N⋅m (465 lb⋅ft) of torque, and an electronically-limited top speed of 250 km/h (155 mph). The CLS 63 AMG was able to reach 100 km/h (62 mph) in 4.5 seconds. Its curb weight was 1,870 kg (4,120 lb).

=== CLS Grand Edition (2009) ===
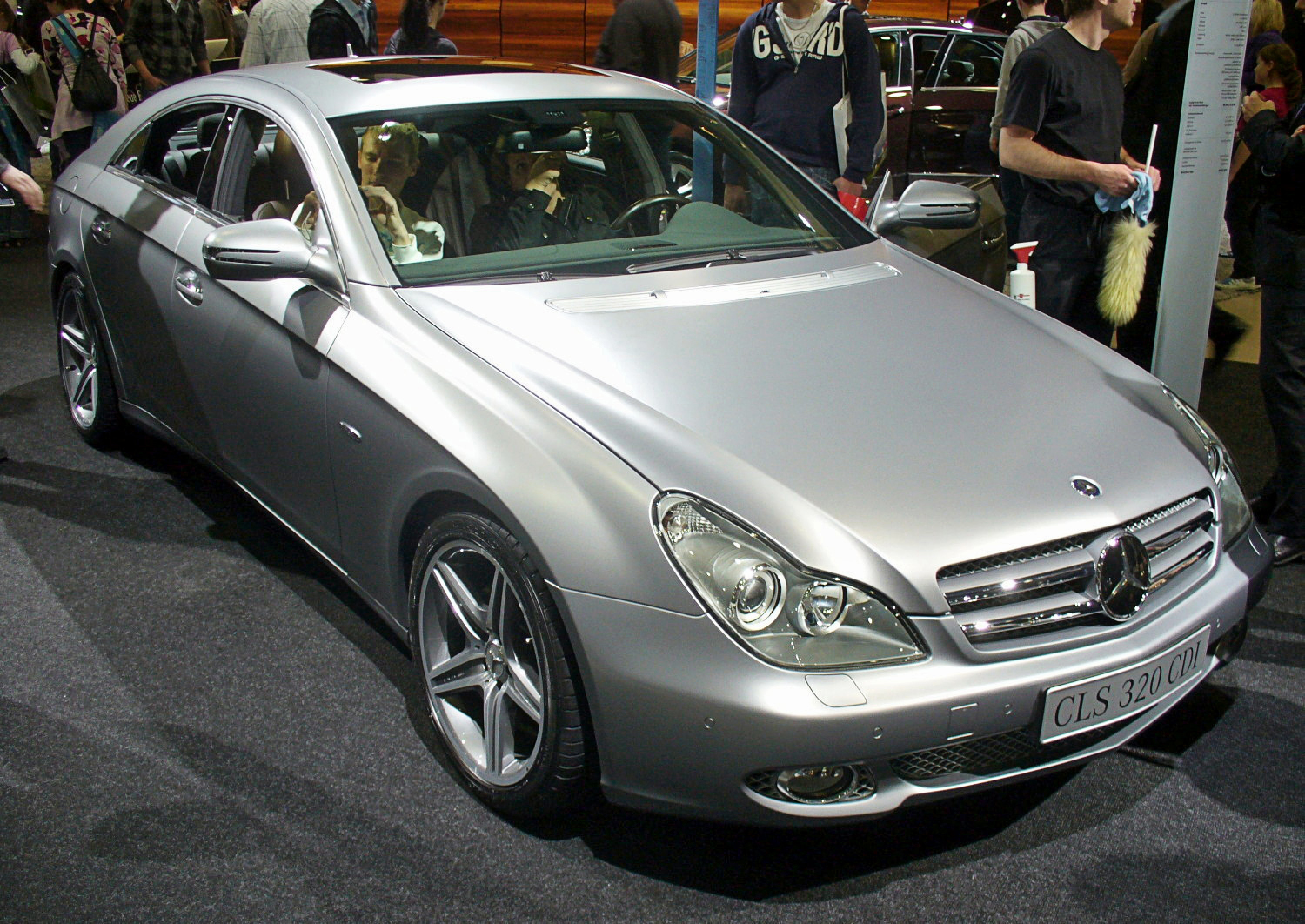
CLS 320 CDI Grand Edition

The CLS Grand Edition was a special edition model of the CLS-Class, with only 560 units produced and sold in 2009. The CLS Grand Edition was available with all non-AMG models at the time, and the CLS 350 CDI model received performance improvements of 38 kW (52 PS; 51 hp) and 50 N⋅m (37 lb⋅ft). Standard equipment included: bi-xenon headlights, titanium grey 18-inch five-spoke alloy wheels, laurel wood interior trim, and 'Grand Edition' insignia. Models were also offered with a choice of designo leather upholstery and four exclusive metallic exterior paint colours.

=== CLS 55 AMG IWC Edition ===
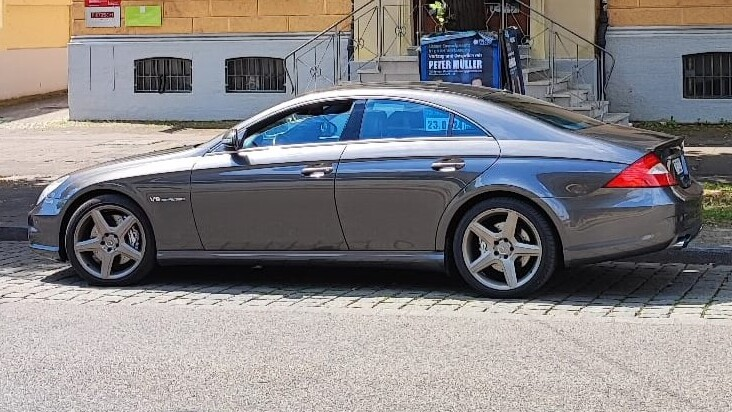
Mercedes CLS 55 AMG IWC Edition

The CLS 55 AMG IWC Edition is a limited-edition model of the CLS-Class produced in collaboration with the Swiss watchmaker IWC Schaffhausen. Launched in 2006, it's based on the CLS 55 AMG and features IWC-inspired details, special badging, and an exclusive IWC Ingenieur watch. Only 55 units were produced.

== Model year changes ==
=== 2006 ===
- CLS 350 replaced by CLS 350 CGI
- CLS 55 AMG replaced by CLS 63 AMG
- CLS 500 upgraded to 5.5-litre engine and renamed as CLS 550 for US and Canada
- SBC was discontinued.

=== 2008 facelift ===
In 2008, a facelift was introduced for the CLS-Class:

- Exterior changes include: restyled bumpers and mirrors, LED taillights, redesigned grille now with two louvres, new alloy-wheel designs, squarer shaped tailpipes
- Interior changes include: introduction of new COMAND APS NTG 2.5 system, non-COMAND systems now have 5.0-inch colour screen, new restyled three-spoke steering wheel
- CLS63 AMG model now comes with: black grille, 19-inch alloy wheels, AMG sports exhaust system, and new AMG steering wheel
- Introduction of CLS280 model

Pre-facelift styling

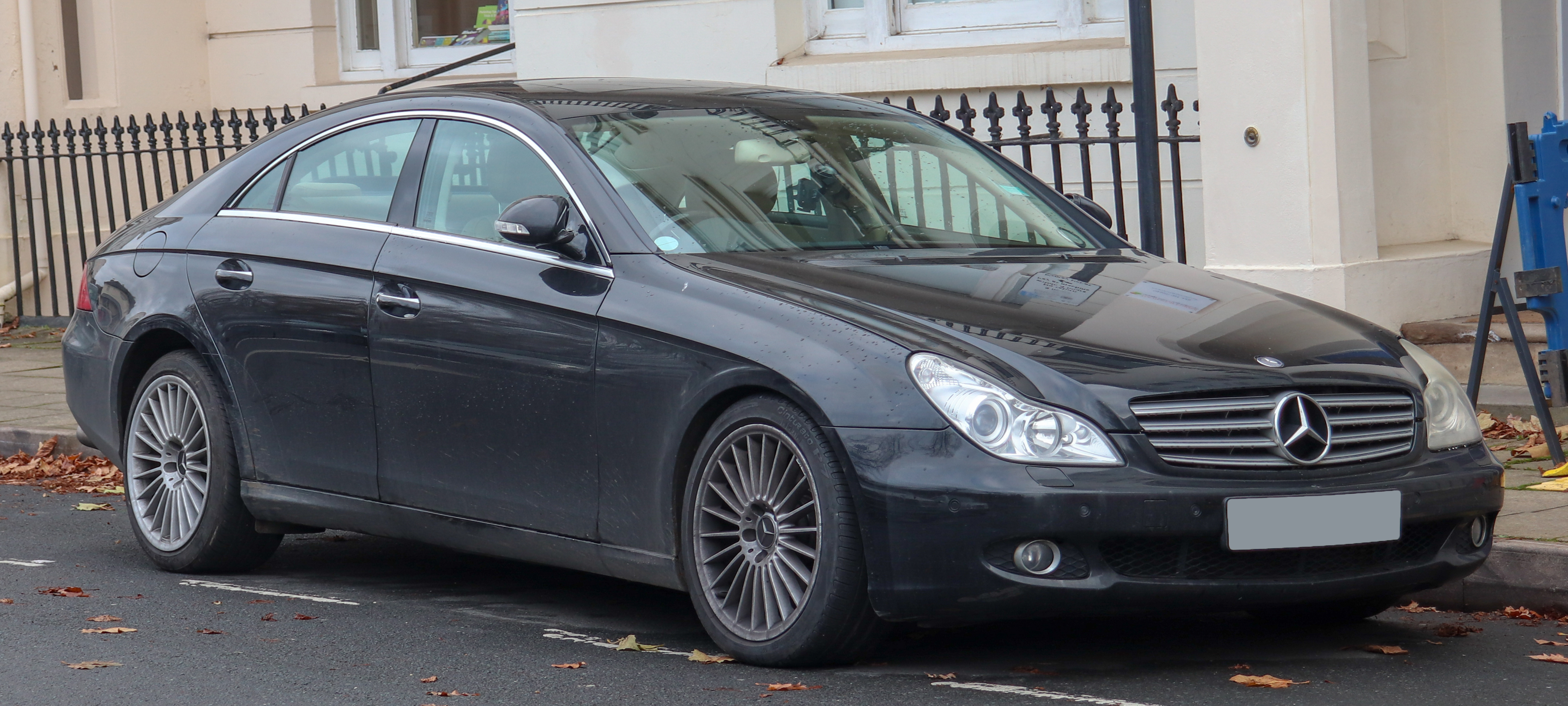
Front

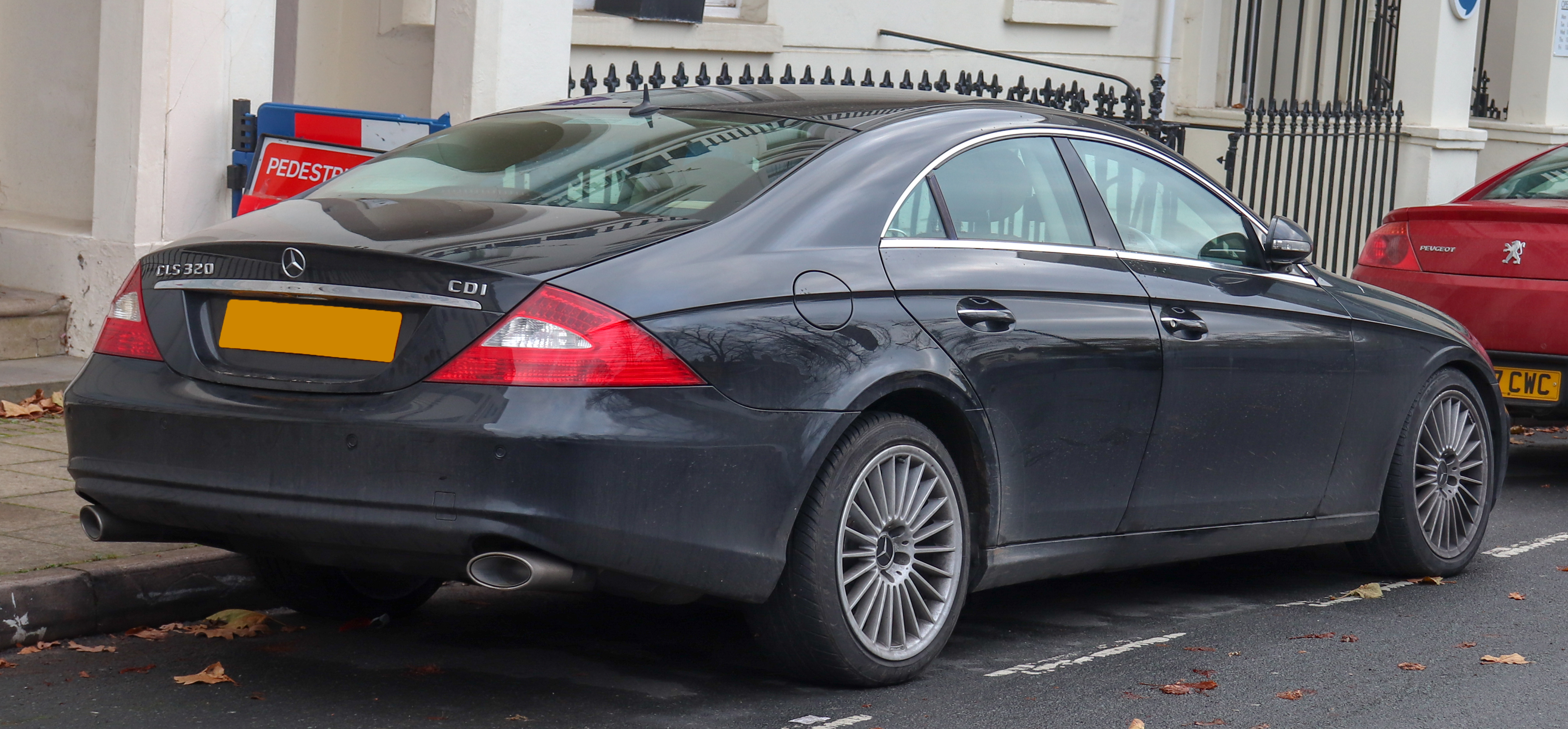
Rear

Post-facelift styling

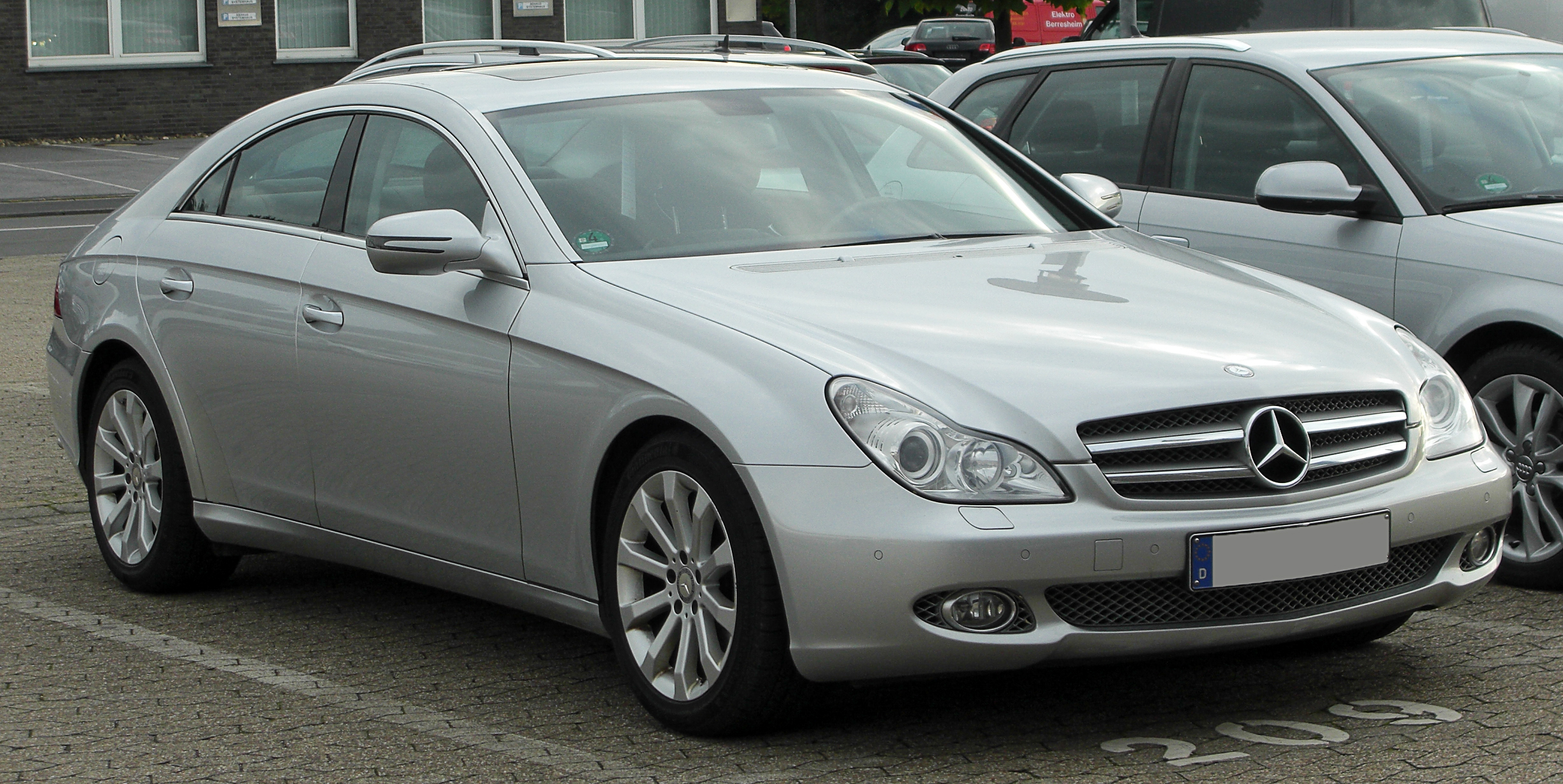
Front

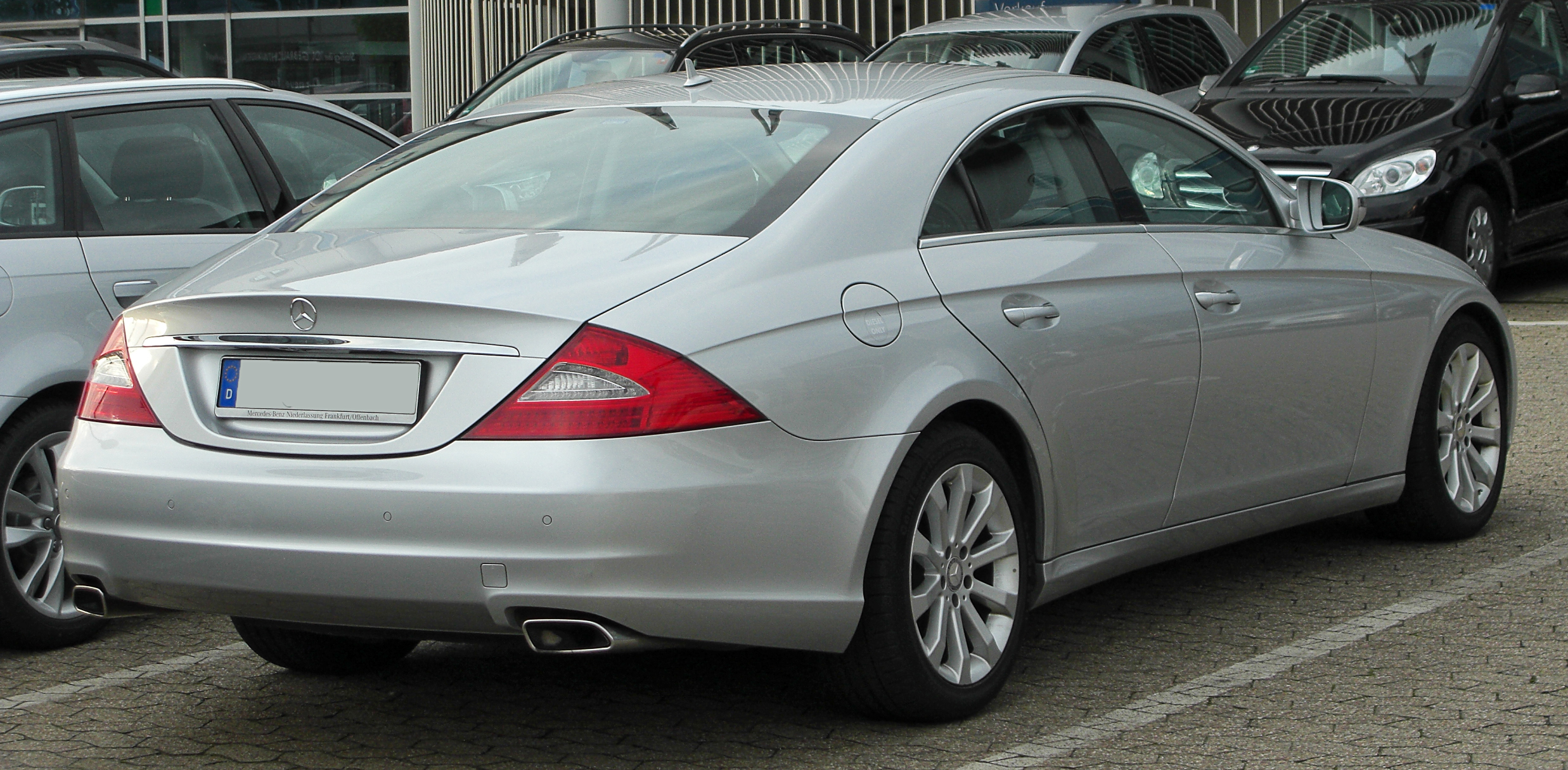
Rear

=== 2009 ===
- Limited production Grand Edition models introduced.

== Sales figures ==
The CLS-Class was produced in Sindelfingen, Germany.

The following are the sales figures in European markets and in the United States only:

Year	EU total	US total
2004	5,543	-
2005	20,147	14,835
2006	20,262	10,763
2007	17,098	7,906
2008	12,224	5,775
2009	6,083	2,527
2010	3,975	2,135
Total:	85,332	43,941
