= Mercedes-Benz CLS =

Executive car series produced by Mercedes-Benz (2003-2023)

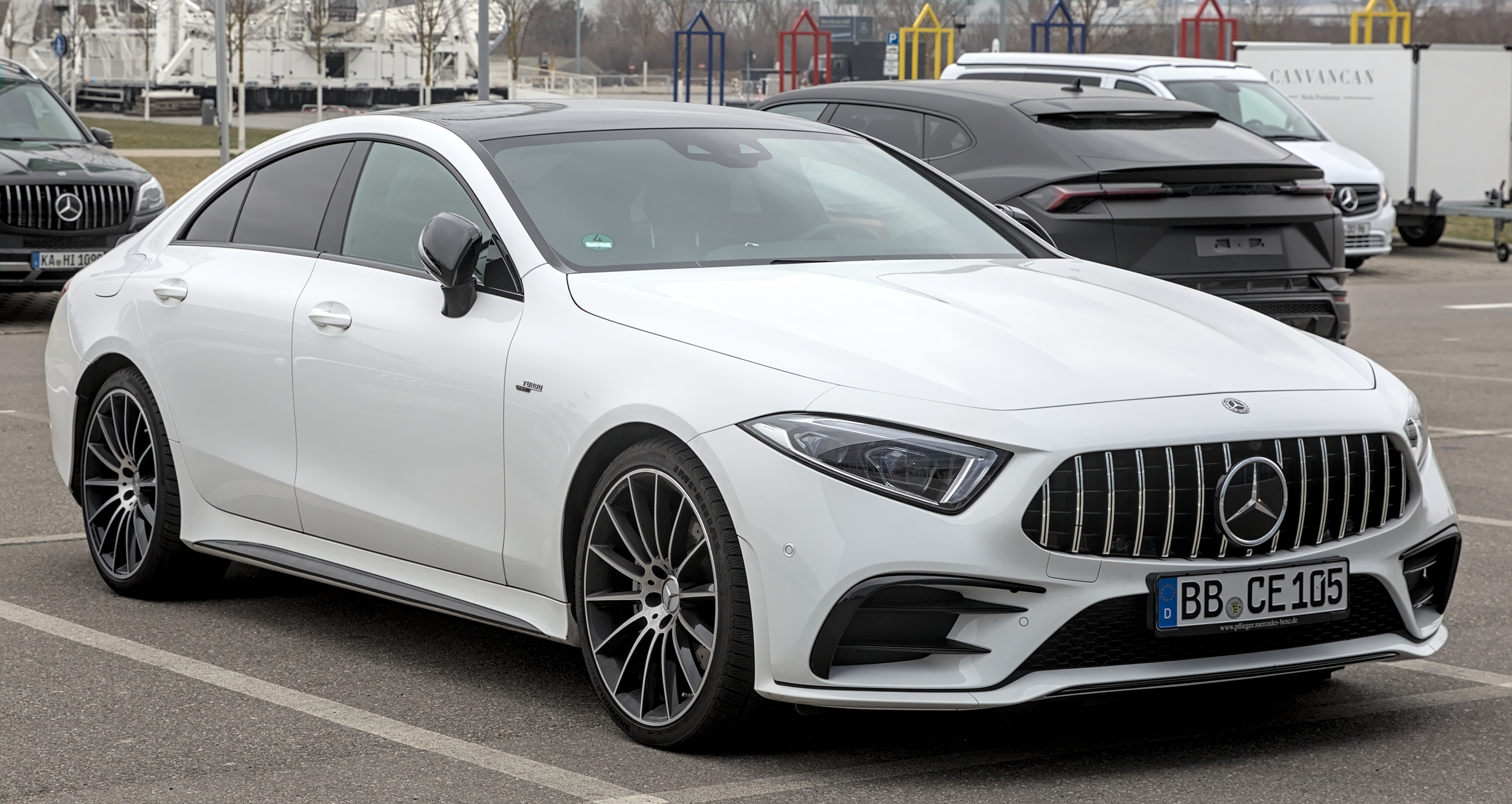
- Mercedes-AMG CLS 53 (C257)

Overview
- Manufacturer: DaimlerChrysler (2003–2007); Daimler AG (2007–2022); Mercedes-Benz Group (2022–2023)
- Production: 2003–2023

Body and chassis
- Class: Executive car (E)
- Body style: 4-door sedan; 5-door shooting brake (X218)
- Layout: Front-engine, rear-wheel-drive; Front-engine, all-wheel-drive (4Matic)

The Mercedes-Benz CLS (initially called the CLS-Class) is a series of executive cars produced by Mercedes-Benz from December 2003 to August 2023.

The original model was a four-door sedan based on the Mercedes E-Class platform, marketed as a four door coupé. An estate (shooting brake) model was later added to the model range with the second generation CLS. All models are available as a high performance AMG variant, although it wasn't until the second generation CLS that 4MATIC all-wheel drive was offered.

The CLS range is positioned between the E-Class and the S-Class within the Mercedes model range, and models tend to be less practical than the E-Class it is based on. It primarily competes with other fastback sedans like the BMW 6 Series Gran Coupe/BMW 8 Series Gran Coupe, Porsche Panamera and Audi A7. Production of the CLS ended on 31 August 2023 to prepare for the launch of the new Mercedes-Benz E-Class (W214).

== First generation (C219; 2004) ==
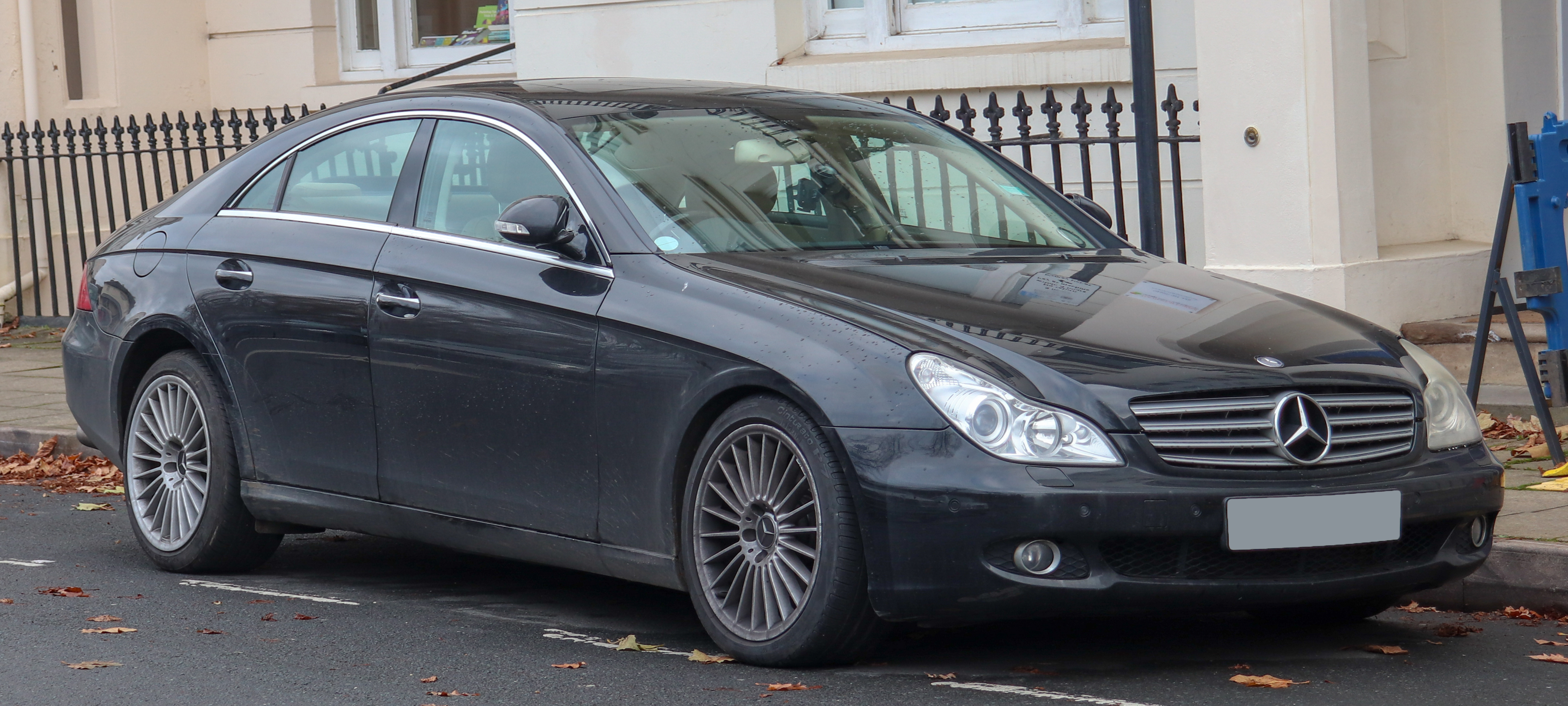
C219 CLS

The first-generation CLS was designed by Michael Fink in 2001 who also styled the first generation CLK, the C-SportCoupé, and Maybach 57 and 62. In Europe, the CLS is recognized as a four-seat coupé and justly named the C219, while in the US, it is commonly referred to as the W219. The C219 CLS is based on the W211 E-Class platform, and shares major components including the engines, transmissions, and has an identical wheelbase of 2,854 mm (112 in). IVM Automotive, a subsidiary of German roof system specialist Edscha, developed the entire vehicle from the Vision CLS concept on which the CLS is based, to the production version which debuted at the 2004 New York International Auto Show.

== Second generation (C218; 2010) ==
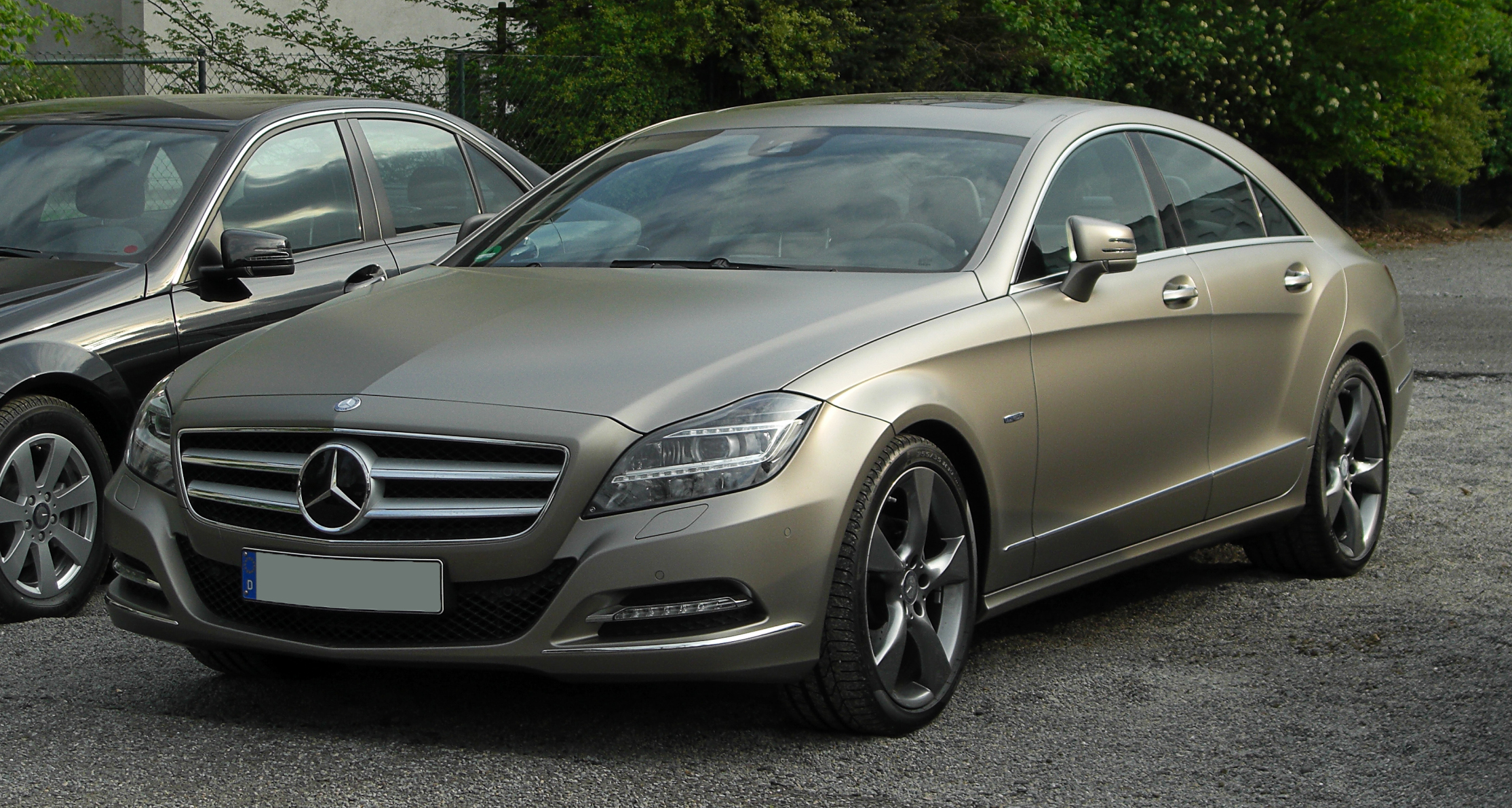
C218 CLS

The C218 CLS is the second generation model, and was sold from 2011 to 2018. The body styles of the range are a 4-door coupé (C218 model code for Europe/ W218 for US market), and a 5-door estate (X218 model code, marketed as 'Shooting Brake'). The design of the CLS was based on the Mercedes F800 concept and featured design cues from other models including the Mercedes SLS AMG. Unlike its predecessor, the C218 CLS is available with all-wheel drive and can be optionally configured on CLS 63 AMG models as well. In 2014, the CLS underwent a facelift and featured design changes, engine enhancements, and the adoption of the Mercedes 9G-Tronic automatic transmission.

== Third generation (C257; 2018) ==
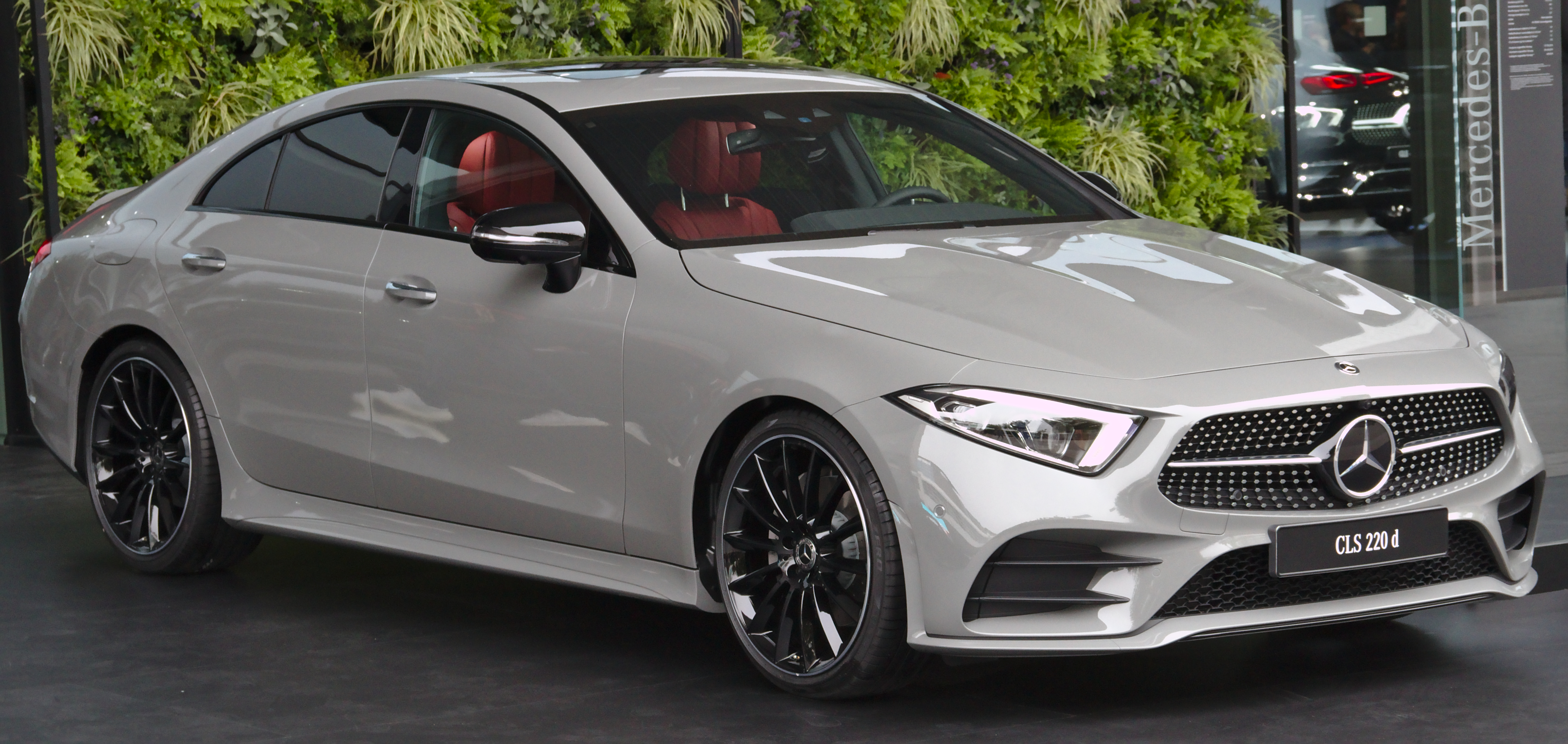
C257 CLS

The C257 CLS is the third-generation model and was previously available only as a four-door sedan and in rear-wheel or all-wheel drive (4MATIC) configuration. The Shooting Brake body style was in development and the final design had been approved for the C257 CLS, but was discontinued prior to commencing production due to poor and declining demand overseas for the last generation 5-door estate. The range of engines consist of a 2.9-litre straight six turbocharged diesel engine and a 3.0-litre straight six turbocharged petrol engine. The latter equips the CLS 53 AMG with features such as a mild hybrid system and an Panamericana radiator grille, which pays tribute to 300 SL model. The CLS is also now a five-seater car, instead of being a four-seater as with the previous two generations.

== Sales ==
Year	Europe	U.S.	China
2004	5,543		
2005	20,147	14,835	
2006	20,262	10,763	
2007	17,098	7,906	
2008	12,224	5,775	
2009	6,083	2,527	
2010	3,975	2,135	
2011	17,414	5,665	
2012	12,797	8,065	
2013	15,139	8,032	
2014	10,289	6,981	
2015	12,600	6,152	
2016	7,803	4,156	
2017	5,116	1,839	
2018	9,113	943	
2019	8,428	941	
2020	3,895	1,206	
2021			
2022			
2023			3,400
2024			1,065
