= Mercedes-Benz Vision CLS =

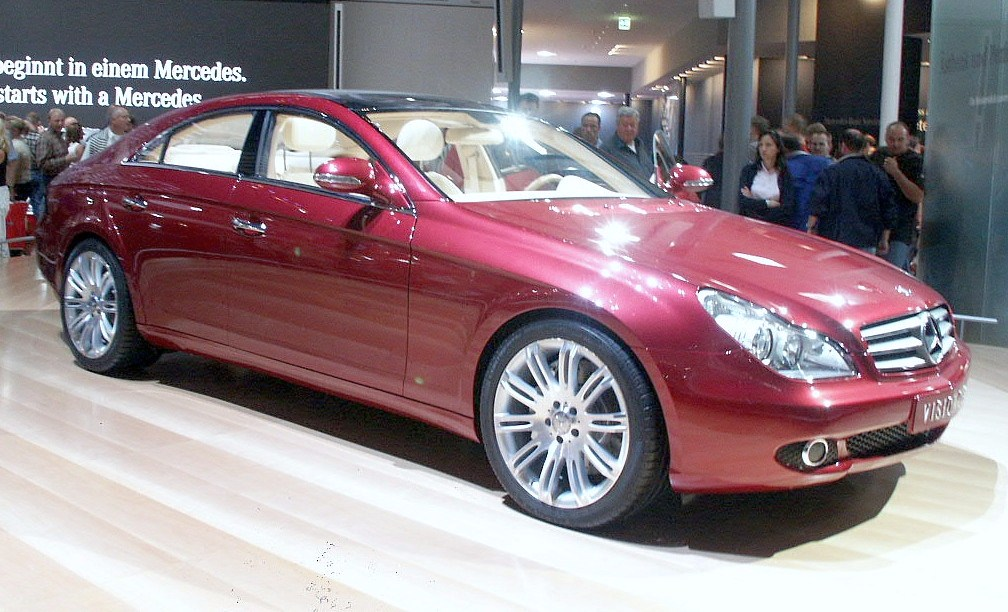

Overview
- Manufacturer: DaimlerChrysler
- Production: 2003 (Concept car)

Body and chassis
- Class: Concept car
- Body style: 4-door coupé
- Layout: FR

Powertrain
- Engine: 3.0 L V6 turbodiesel
- Transmission: 7-speed 7G-Tronic automatic

Chronology
- Successor: Mercedes-Benz CLS-Class (C219)

The Mercedes-Benz Vision CLS is a concept vehicle unveiled at the 2003 Frankfurt International Motor Show (IAA). It was a preview of the Mercedes-Benz CLS-Class (C219).

== Specifications ==
The Vision CLS is powered by a six-cylinder twin turbo diesel engine rated at 265 PS (195 kW; 261 hp) and 560 N·m (413 lb·ft), paired with a 7G-TRONIC seven-speed automatic transmission. It features the Active Light System from the Mercedes-Benz E-Class (W211), electrohydraulic brake system from the Mercedes-Benz SL (R 230), dashboard and A-pillars upholstered in leather, soft leather upholstery on seats and door panels, oak veneer, glass roof, 470 litres of boot capacity, adaptive front airbags, window bags and side airbags, and belt tensioners with adaptive belt force limiters.

== Gallery ==
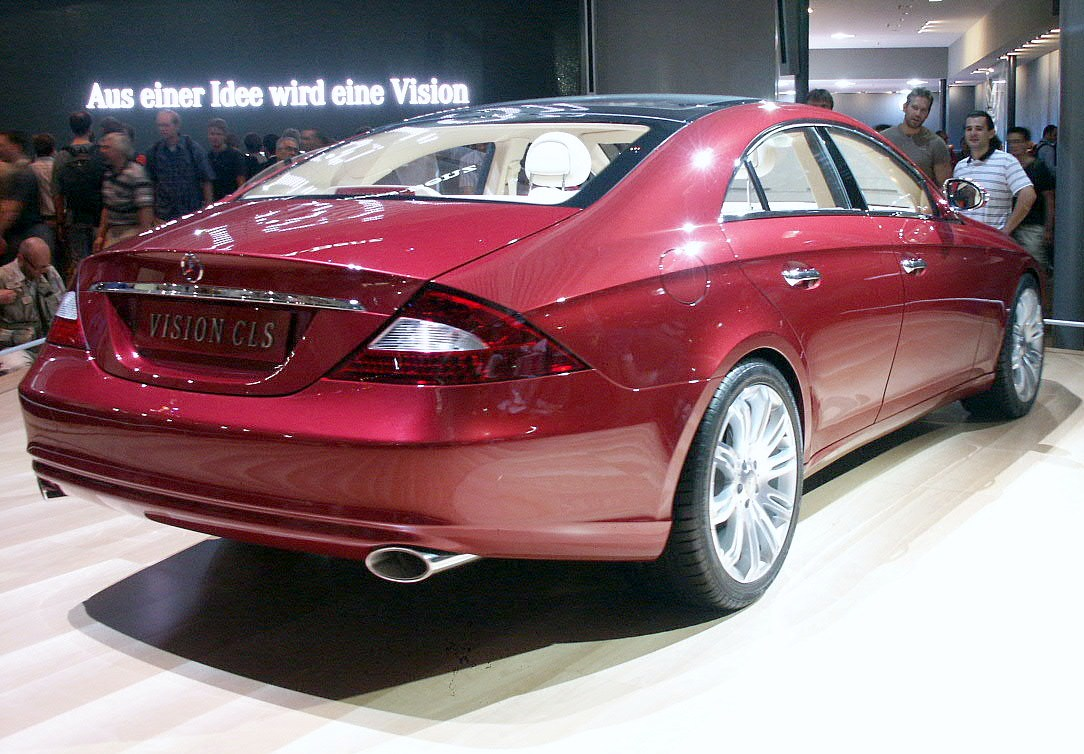
Mercedes-Benz Vision CLS at the 2003 Frankfurt International Motor Show

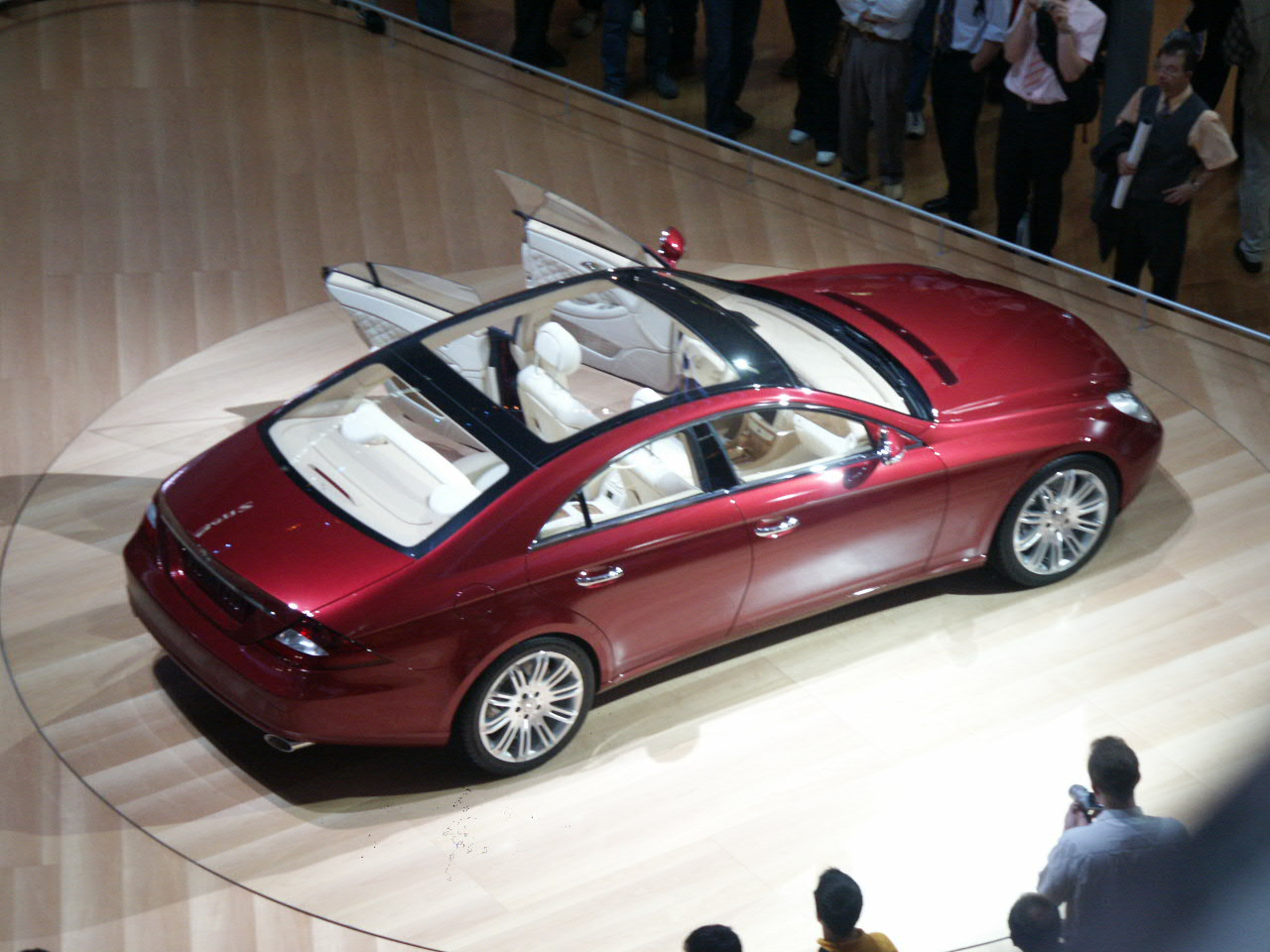
Vision CLS viewed from above

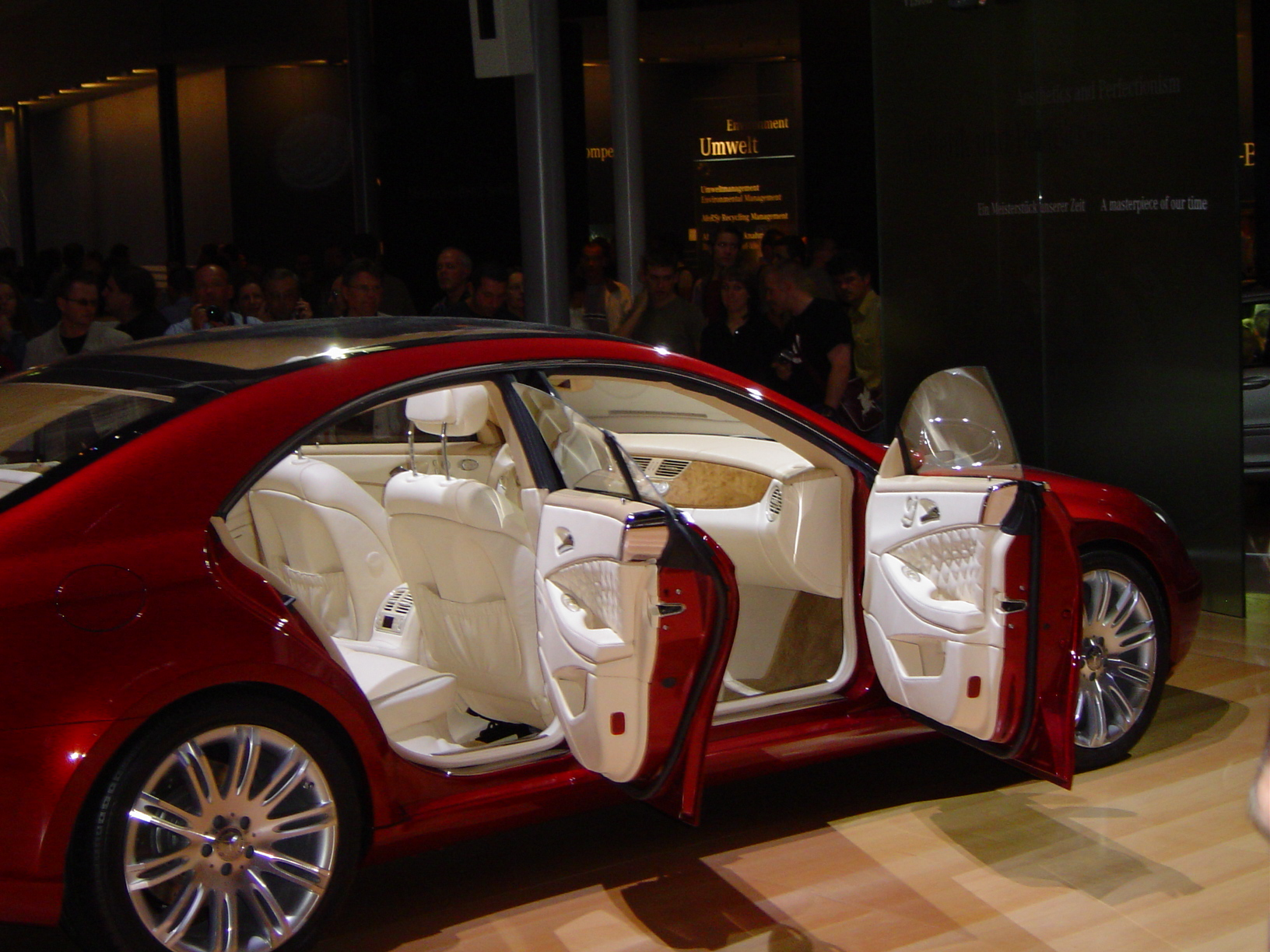
Doors open showing the interior
