= Roof module =

A roof module is a complete top for a convertible. Such tops can be a softtop or a retractable hardtop which are produced by specialized convertible top suppliers and supplied to the OEMs. The OEMs finally are completing their cars in their own production lines with these tops to a convertible.

Depending on the OEM it is possible that these suppliers are working as a full service vehicle supplier and are producing the complete cars (e.g. Karmann, Heuliez or Pininfarina). Car Top Systems, Edscha and OASys (Automotive) are not full service vehicle suppliers and deliver only the top to the OEMs.
