= Edscha =

German manufacturing company

Edscha Cabrio-Dachsysteme is an original equipment manufacturer of automobile convertible roof systems. The company is headquartered in Hengersberg, in Lower Bavaria in Germany. Other locations include Pontiac near Detroit in the USA; Niagara Falls in Canada; Toluca in Mexico; Coventry in England; Les Ulis near Paris in France; Cantabria in Spain; Velky Meder in Slovakia; Regensburg in Germany; Shanghai in China; Yokohama in Japan and Togliatti in Russia.

Edscha Cabrio-Dachsysteme is one of the top three convertible producers worldwide. The company has manufactured convertible systems for vehicles ranging from the Jaguar XK; Audi A3, Peugeot 207CC; BMW 3 Series VHT; Smart Fortwo and the Maybach Landaulet.

Edscha has pioneered innovations including the light weight roof of the BMW Z4 with a total weight of only 24 kg, the benchmark convertible for aerodynamics and aeroacoustics the BMW 6 Series with a noise level of only 62dBA at 100 km/h, the true 4-seater convertible retractable hard top and the convertible top of the Mercedes-Benz SLR with a top speed of over 340 km/h.

Edscha has developed convertible technologies such as the foam injected insulation (BMW 6 Series and Rolls-Royce), the sandwich structured composite light weight material (Smart Roadster and BMW Z8), the sliding roof (Smart Roadster and Smart ForTwo), the finned styled softtop (BMW 6 Series and Lamborghini Gallardo Spyder) as well as the first and only fully functioning anti-pinch system for convertibles in the world.

Edscha Cabrio-Dachsysteme belongs to Edscha AG, which is one of the top automotive suppliers in the world according to Automobile Produktion Magazine.

In February 2009, Edscha filed for insolvency. Edscha Cabrio-Dachsysteme was separated from the Edscha AG parent and integrated into Webasto AG as a convertible system division along with the Webasto's convertible department, thus forming Webasto-Edscha Cabrio. In 2016, the launch of production in Tolyatti, Russia.

== Past production of roof modules ==
Edscha has produced roof modules for vehicles as follows:

- BMW 3 Series Convertible (1985, 1993, 1999 & 2007)
- BMW Z1 Roadster (1988)
- Audi 80 Convertible (softtop and hardtop) (1991)
- Volvo C70 Convertible (1997)
- Land Rover Freelander Convertible (1998)
- Audi TT Roadster (1999 & 2006)
- BMW Z8 Roadster (softtop and hardtop) (1999)
- BMW Z4 Roadster (2002 & 2009)
- Opel Astra Convertible (2000)
- Smart Roadster (softtop and hardtop) (2003)
- BMW 6 Series Convertible (2004)
- Chrysler PT Cruiser Convertible (2004)
- Aston Martin DB9 Volante (2005)
- Lamborghini Gallardo Spyder (2005)
- Bentley Azure Drophead (2006)
- Jaguar XK Convertible (2006)
- Mercedes-Benz / McLaren SLR Roadster (2007)
- Peugeot 207CC Convertible (2007)
- Rolls-Royce Phantom Drophead (2007)
- Smart Fortwo Cabrio (2007)
- Audi A3 Convertible (2008)
- Maybach Landaulet (2008)
- Alfa Romeo 8C Spider (2009)
