= Coupe =

Car body style

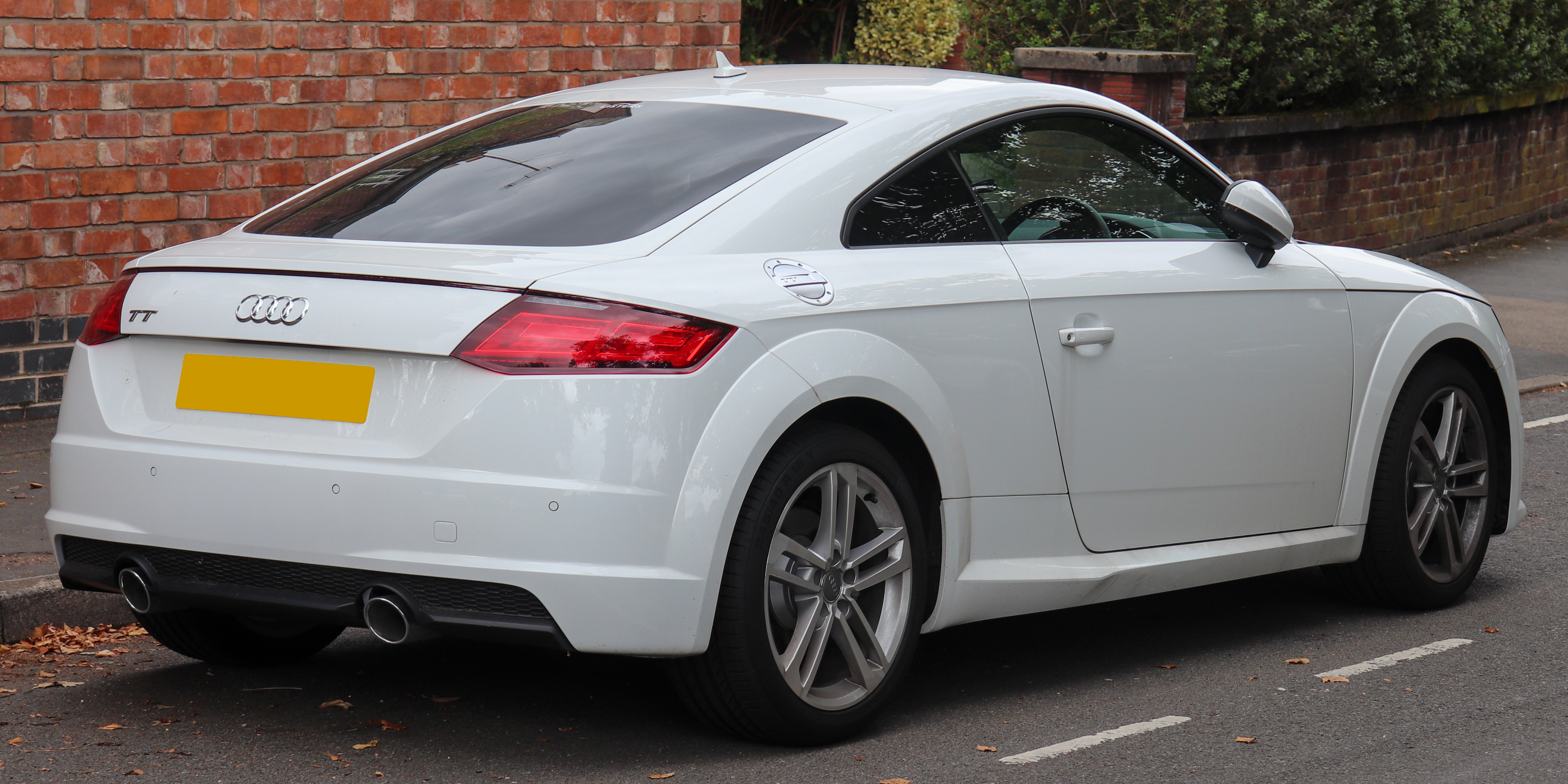
Audi TT coupé

A coupe or coupé (/kuːˈpeɪ/, also US: /kuːp/) is a passenger car with a sloping or truncated rear roofline and typically with two doors.

The term coupé was first applied to horse-drawn carriages for two passengers without rear-facing seats. It comes from the French past participle of couper, "cut".

Some coupé cars only have two seats, while some also feature rear seats. However, these rear seats are usually lower quality and much smaller than those in the front. Furthermore, "A fixed-top two-door sports car would be best and most appropriately be termed a 'sports coupe' or 'sports coupé'".

== Etymology and pronunciation ==
Coupé (French pronunciation: [kupe]) is based on the past participle of the French verb couper ("to cut") and thus indicates a car which has been "cut" or made shorter than standard. It was first applied to horse-drawn carriages for two passengers without rear-facing seats. These berlines coupées or carrosses coupés ("clipped carriages") were eventually clipped to coupés.

There are two common pronunciations in English:

- /kuːˈpeɪ/ (koo-PAY) – the anglicized version of the French pronunciation of coupé.
- /kuːp/ (KOOP) – as a spelling pronunciation when the word is written without an accent. This is the usual pronunciation and spelling in the United States and much of Canada, with the pronunciation entering American vernacular no later than 1936 and featuring in the Beach Boys' hit 1963 song "Little Deuce Coupe".

== Definition ==
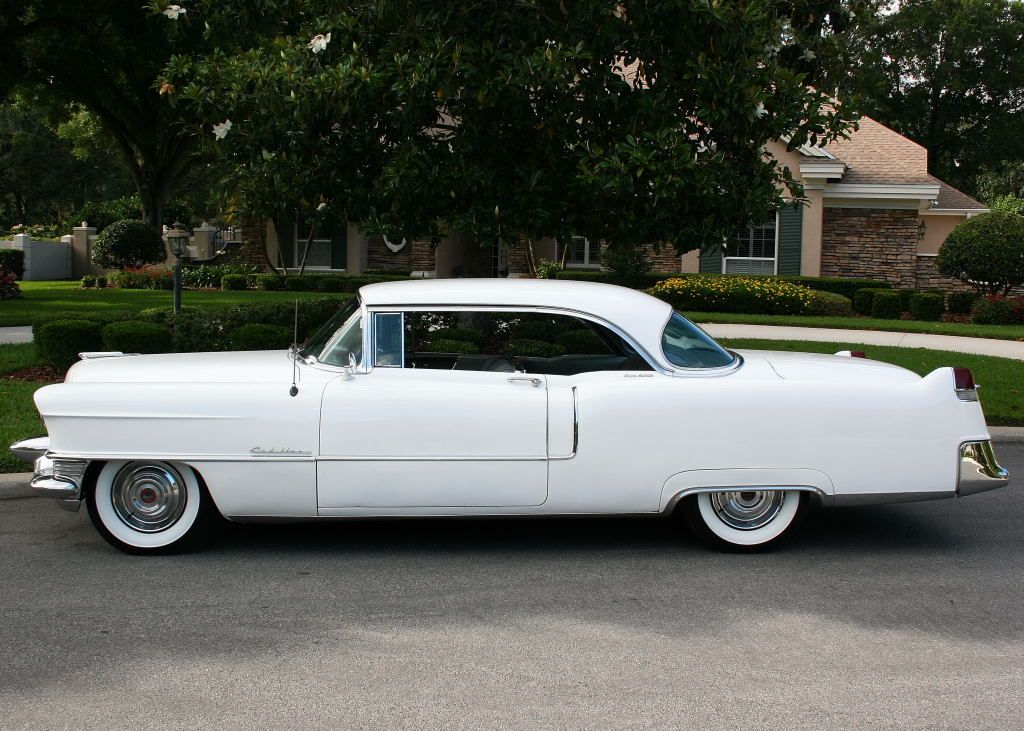
1955 Cadillac Coupe de Ville

A coupé is a fixed-roof car with a sloping rear roofline and one or two rows of seats. However, there is some debate surrounding whether a coupe must have two doors for passenger egress or whether cars with four doors can also be considered coupés. This debate has arisen since the early 2000s, when four-door cars such as the Mazda RX-8 and Mercedes-Benz CLS-Class have been marketed as "four-door coupés" or "quad coupés", although the Rover P5 was a much earlier example, with a variant introduced in 1962 having a lower, sleeker roofline marketed as the Rover P5 Coupé.

In the 1940s and 1950s, coupés were distinguished from sedans by their shorter roof area and sportier profile. Similarly, in more recent times, when a model is sold in both coupé and sedan body styles, generally the coupe is sportier and more compact. There have been a number of two-door sedans built as well, a bodystyle the French call a coach.

The 1977 version of International Standard ISO 3833—Road vehicles - Types - Terms and definitions—defines a coupe as having two doors (along with a fixed roof, usually with limited rear volume, at least two seats in at least one row and at least two side windows).

The definition of coupé started to blur when manufacturers began to produce cars with a 2+2 body style (which have a sleek, sloping roofline, two doors, and two functional seats up front, plus two small seats in the back).

Some manufacturers also blur the definition of a coupé by applying this description to models featuring a hatchback or a rear cargo area access door that opens upwards. Most often also featuring a fold-down back seat, the hatchback or liftback layout of these cars improves their practicality and cargo room.

== Horse-drawn carriages ==
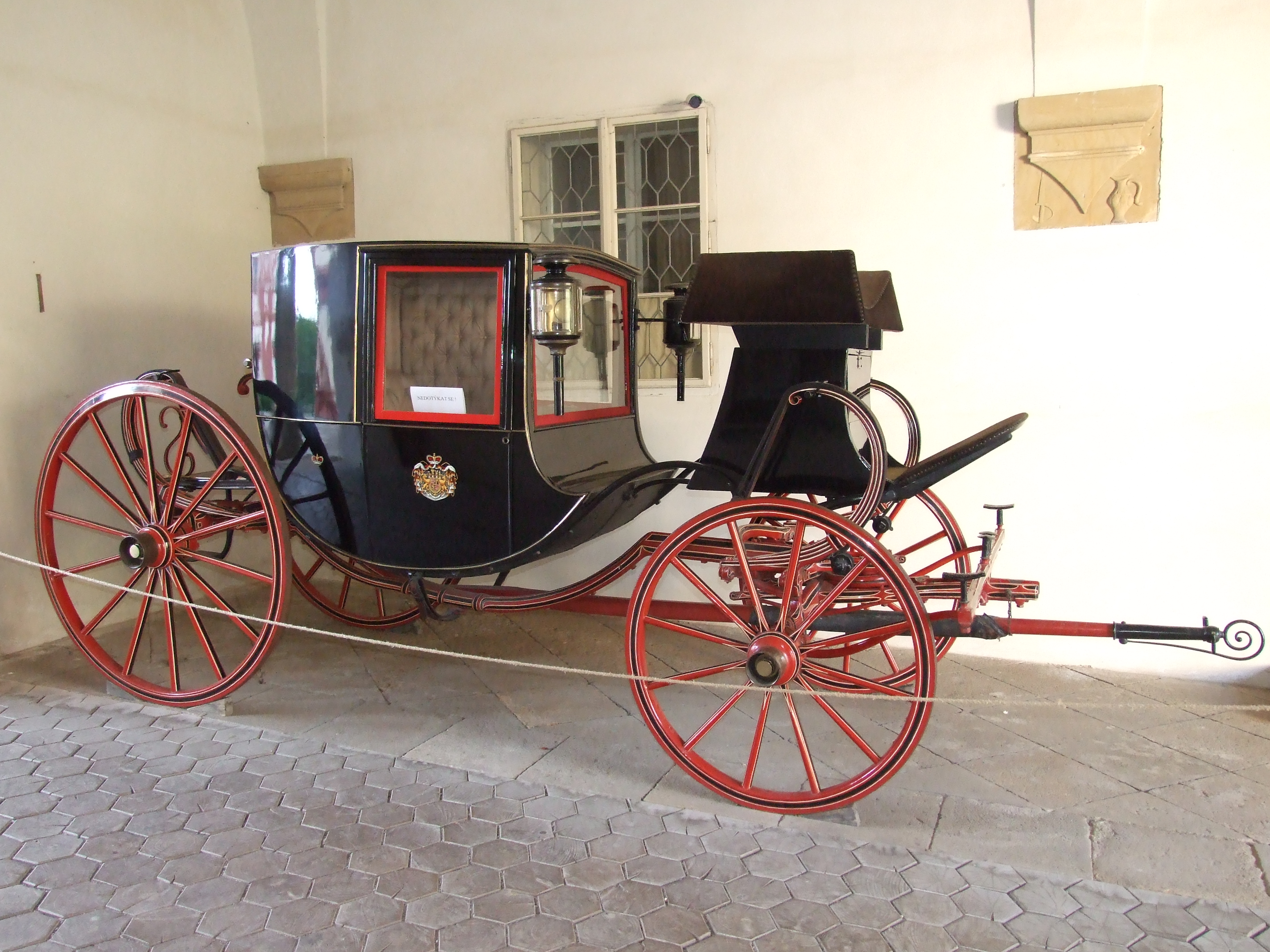
Example of a coupe carriage

The coupe carriage body style originated from the berline horse-drawn carriage. The coupe version of the berline was introduced in the 18th century as a shortened ("cut") version with no rear-facing seat. Normally, a coupé had a fixed glass window in the front of the passenger compartment. The coupé was considered an ideal vehicle for women to use to go shopping or to make social visits.

== History ==
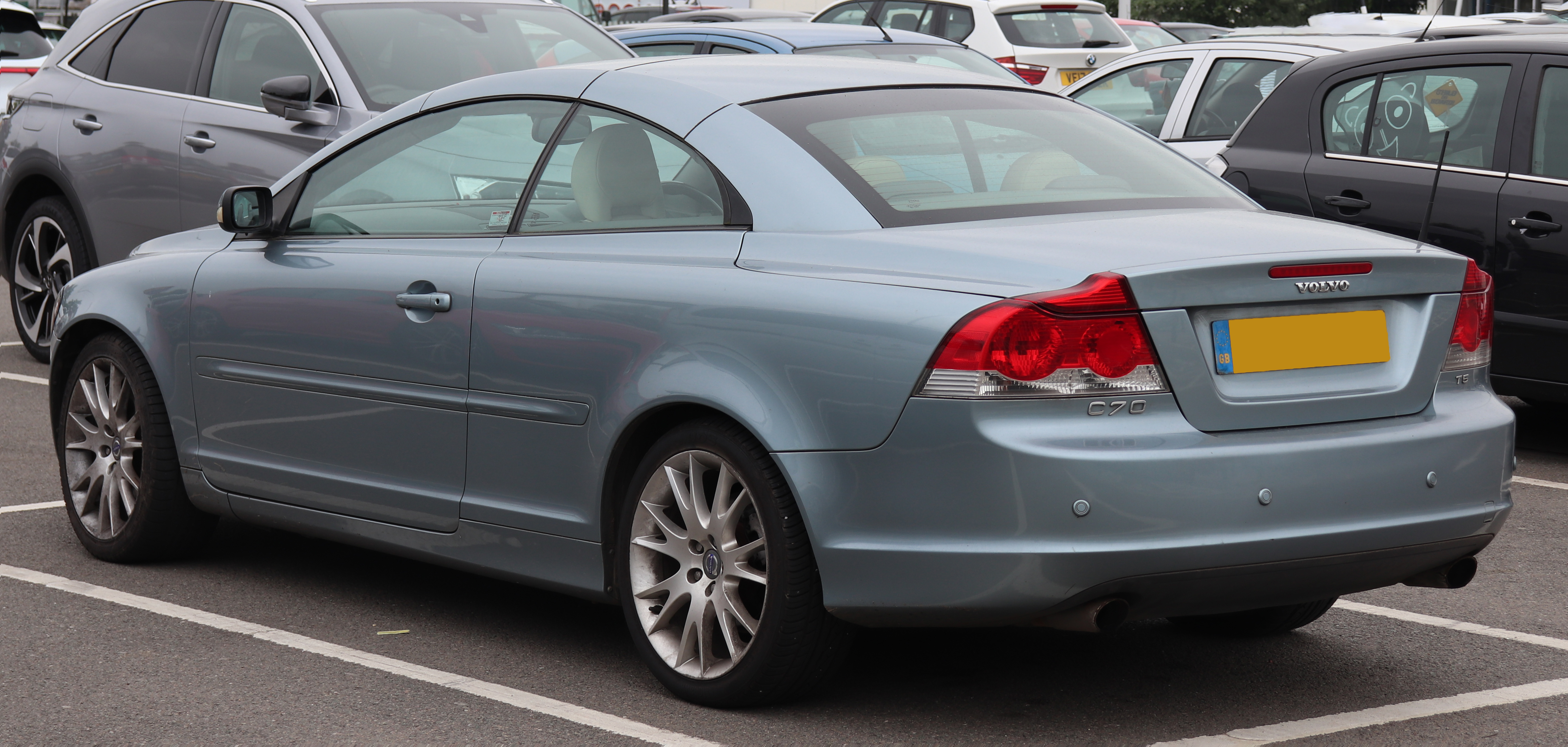
Volvo C70, an example of a convertible coupe

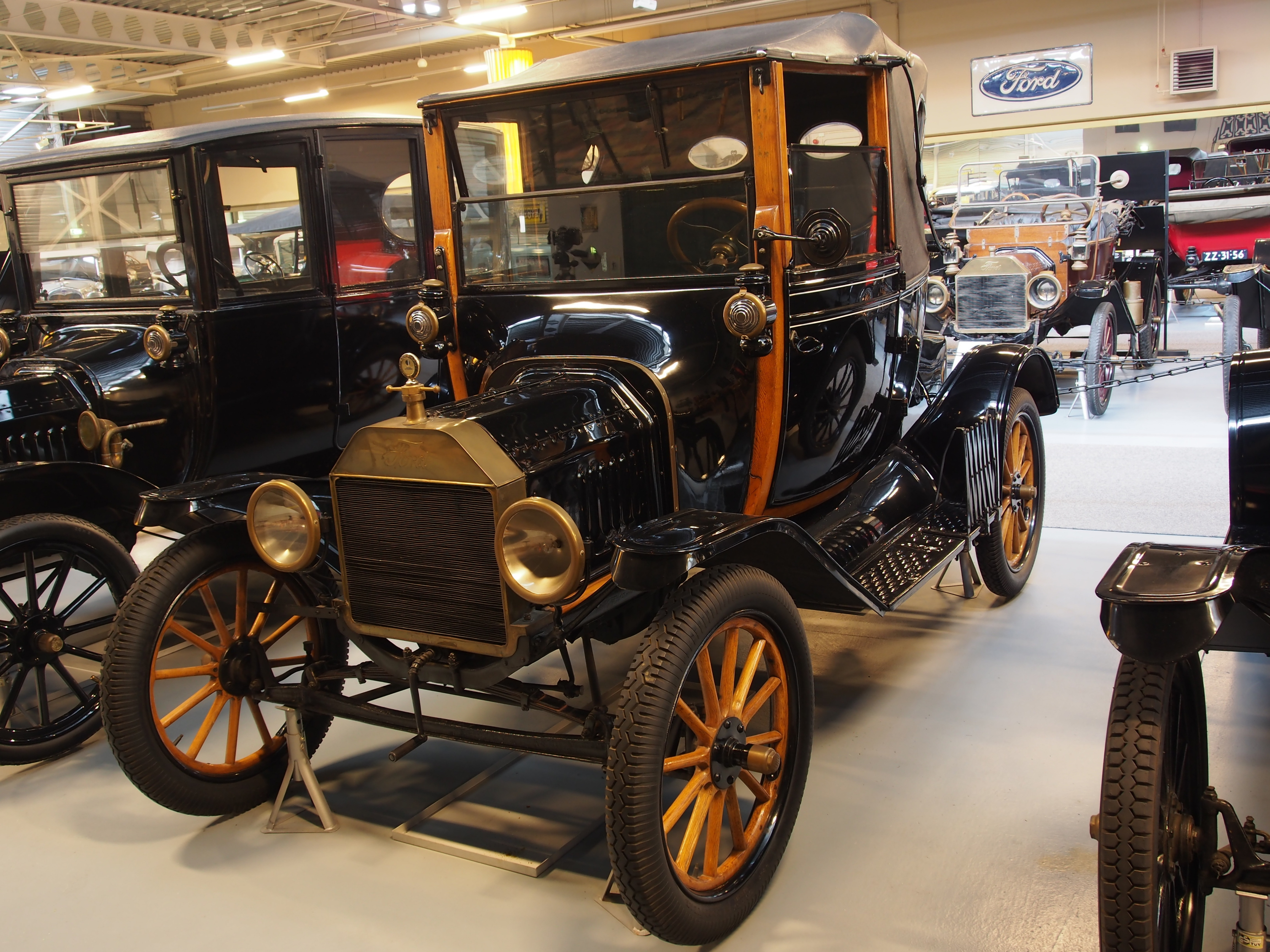
A 1915 Ford T Coupelet

The early coupé automobile's passenger compartment followed in general conception the design of horse-drawn coupés, with the driver in the open at the front and an enclosure behind him for two passengers on one bench seat. The French variant for this word thus denoted a car with a small passenger compartment.

By the 1910s, the term had evolved to denote a two-door car with the driver and up to two passengers in an enclosure with a single bench seat. The coupé de ville, or coupé chauffeur, was an exception, retaining the open driver's section at front.

In 1916, the Society of Automobile Engineers suggested nomenclature for car bodies that included the following:

Coupe: An enclosed car operated from the inside with seats for two or three and sometimes a backward-facing fourth seat.

Coupelet: A small car seating two or three with a folding top and full height doors with fully retractable windows.

Convertible coupe: A roadster with a removable coupe roof.

During the 20th century, the term coupé was applied to various close-coupled cars (where the rear seat is located further forward than usual and the front seat further back than usual).

Since the 1960s the term coupé has generally referred to a two-door car with a fixed roof.

Since 2005, several models with four doors have been marketed as "four-door coupés", however, reactions are mixed about whether these models are actually sedans instead of coupés. According to Edmunds, an American automotive guide, "the four-door coupe category doesn't really exist."

== Variations ==
=== Berlinetta ===
A berlinetta is a lightweight sporty two-door car, typically with two seats but also including 2+2 cars.

=== Club coupe ===
A club coupe is a two-door car with a larger rear-seat passenger area, compared with the smaller rear-seat area in a 2+2 body style. Thus, club coupes resemble coupes as both have two doors, but feature a full-width rear seat that is accessible by tilting forward the backs of the front seats.

=== Hardtop coupé ===
A hardtop coupe is a two-door car that lacks a structural pillar ("B" pillar) between the front and rear side windows. When these windows are lowered, the effect is like that of a convertible coupé with the windows down. The hardtop body style was popular in the United States from the early 1950s until the 2000s. It was also available in European and Japanese markets. Safety regulations for roof structures to protect passengers in a rollover were proposed, limiting the development of new models. The hardtop body style went out of style with consumers while the automakers focused on cost reduction and increasing efficiencies.

=== Combi coupé ===
Saab used the term "combi coupé" for a car body similar to the liftback.

=== Business coupe ===
A two-door car with no rear seat or with a removable rear seat intended for traveling salespeople and other vendors carrying their wares with them. American manufacturers developed this style of coupe in the late 1930s.

=== Four-door coupe / quad coupe ===
The 1921 and 1922 LaFayette models were available in a variety of open and closed body styles that included a close-coupled version featuring two center-opening doors on each side that was marketed as a Four-Door Coupe. The 1927 Nash Advanced Six was available in four-door coupe body style.

More recently, the description has been applied by marketers to describe four-door cars with a coupe-like roofline at the rear. The low-roof design reduces back-seat passenger access and headroom. The designation was used for the low-roof model of the 1962–1973 Rover P5, followed by the 1992–1996 Nissan Leopard / Infiniti J30. Recent examples include the 2005 Mercedes-Benz CLS, 2010 Audi A7, Volkswagen CC, Volkswagen Arteon, and 2012 BMW 6 Series Gran Coupe.

Similarly, several cars with one or two small rear doors for rear seat passenger egress and no B-pillar have been marketed as "quad coupes". For example, the 2003 Saturn Ion, the 2003 Mazda RX-8, and the 2011–2022 Hyundai Veloster.

=== Three-door coupe ===
Popular in Europe, many cars are designed with coupe styling, but a three-door hatchback/liftback layout to improve practicality, including cars such as the Jaguar E-Type, Mitsubishi 3000GT, Datsun 240Z, Toyota Supra, Mazda RX-7, Alfa Romeo Brera, Ford/Mercury Cougar and Volkswagen Scirocco.

=== Opera coupe ===
A two-door car designed for driving to the opera with easy access to the rear seats. Features sometimes included a folding front seat next to the driver or a compartment to store top hats.

Often they would have solid rear-quarter panels, with small, circular windows, to enable the occupants to see out without being seen. These opera windows were revived on many U.S. automobiles during the 1970s and early 1980s.

=== Three-window coupe ===
The three-window coupe (commonly just "three-window") is a style of automobile characterized by two side windows and a backlight (rear window). The front windscreens are not counted. The three-window coupe has a distinct difference from the five-window coupe, which has an additional window on each side behind the front doors. These two-door cars typically have small-sized bodies with only a front seat and an occasional small rear seat.

The style was popular from the 1920s until the beginning of World War II. While many manufacturers produced three-window coupes, the 1932 Ford coupe is often considered the classic hot rod.

=== Coupe SUV ===
Some SUVs or crossovers with sloping rear rooflines are marketed as "coupe crossover SUVs" or "coupe SUVs", even though they have four side doors for passenger egress to the seats and rear hatches for cargo area access however only a car with 2 doors and no B style are considered a true coupe.

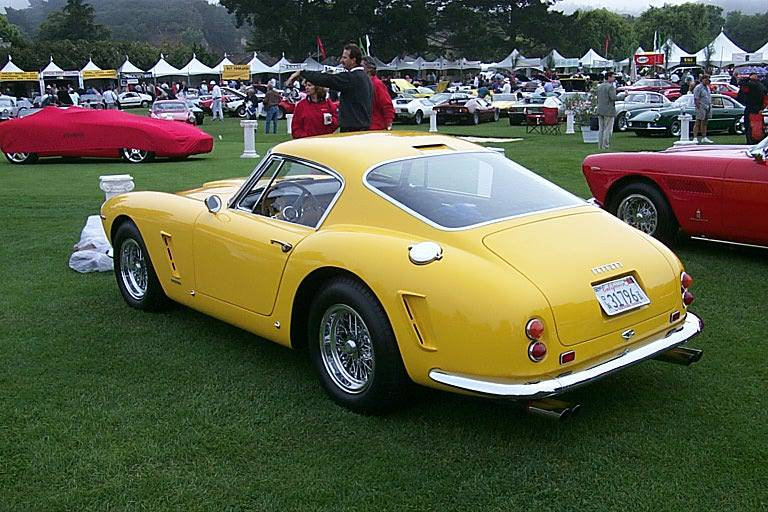
Ferrari 250 GT Berlinetta - a Berlinetta coupe

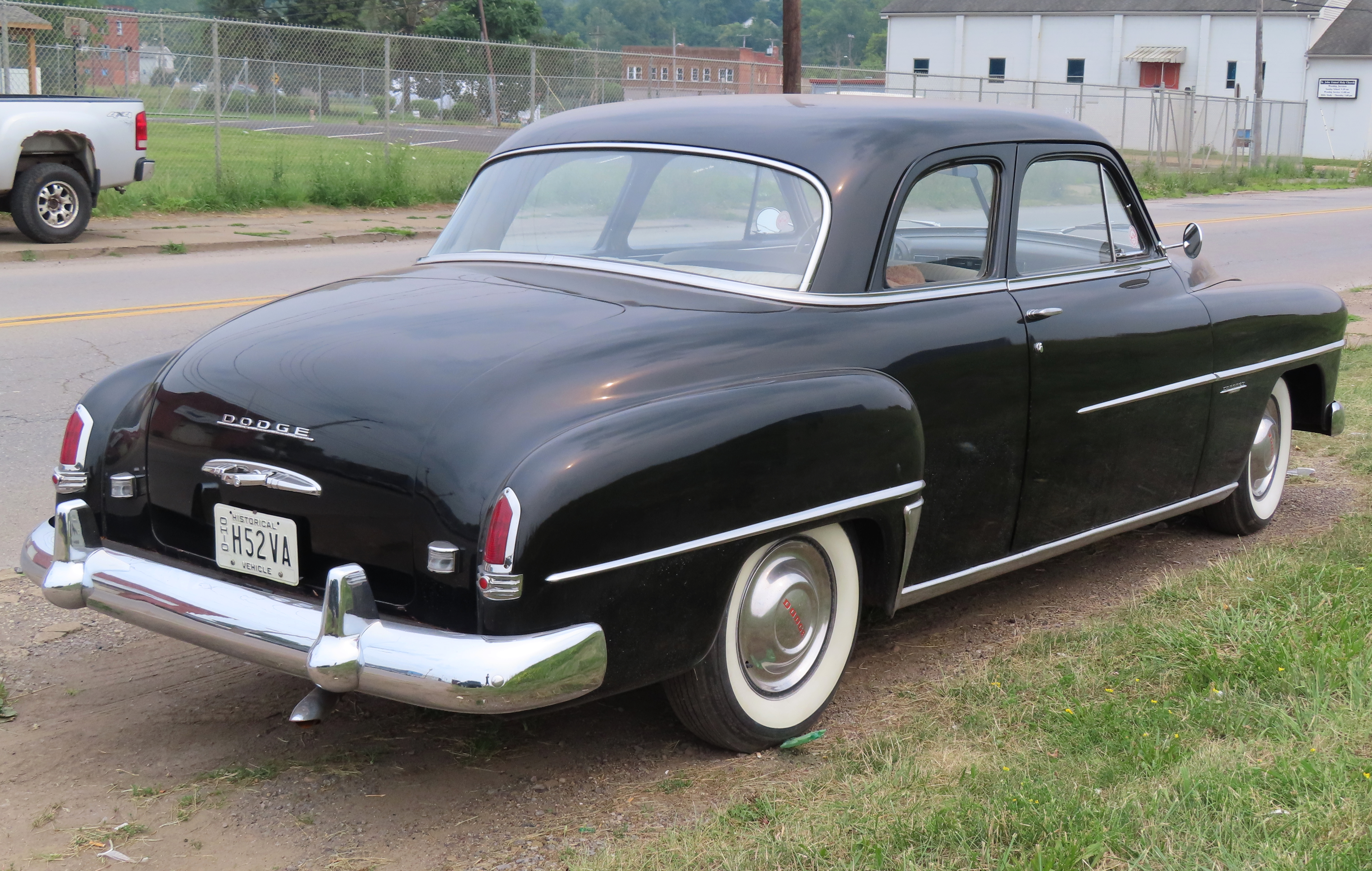
Dodge Coronet club coupe

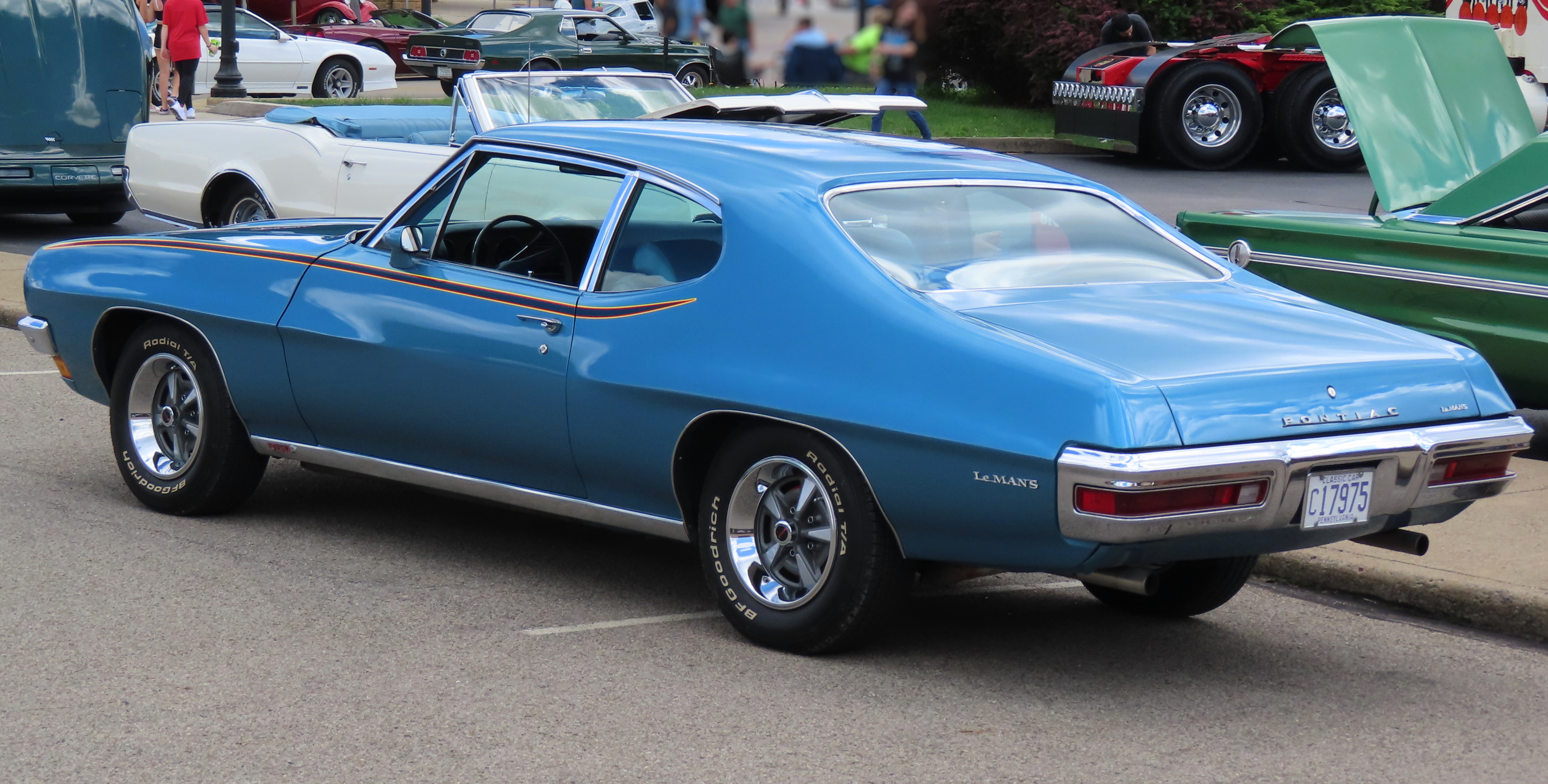
Pontiac LeMans Sport hardtop coupe

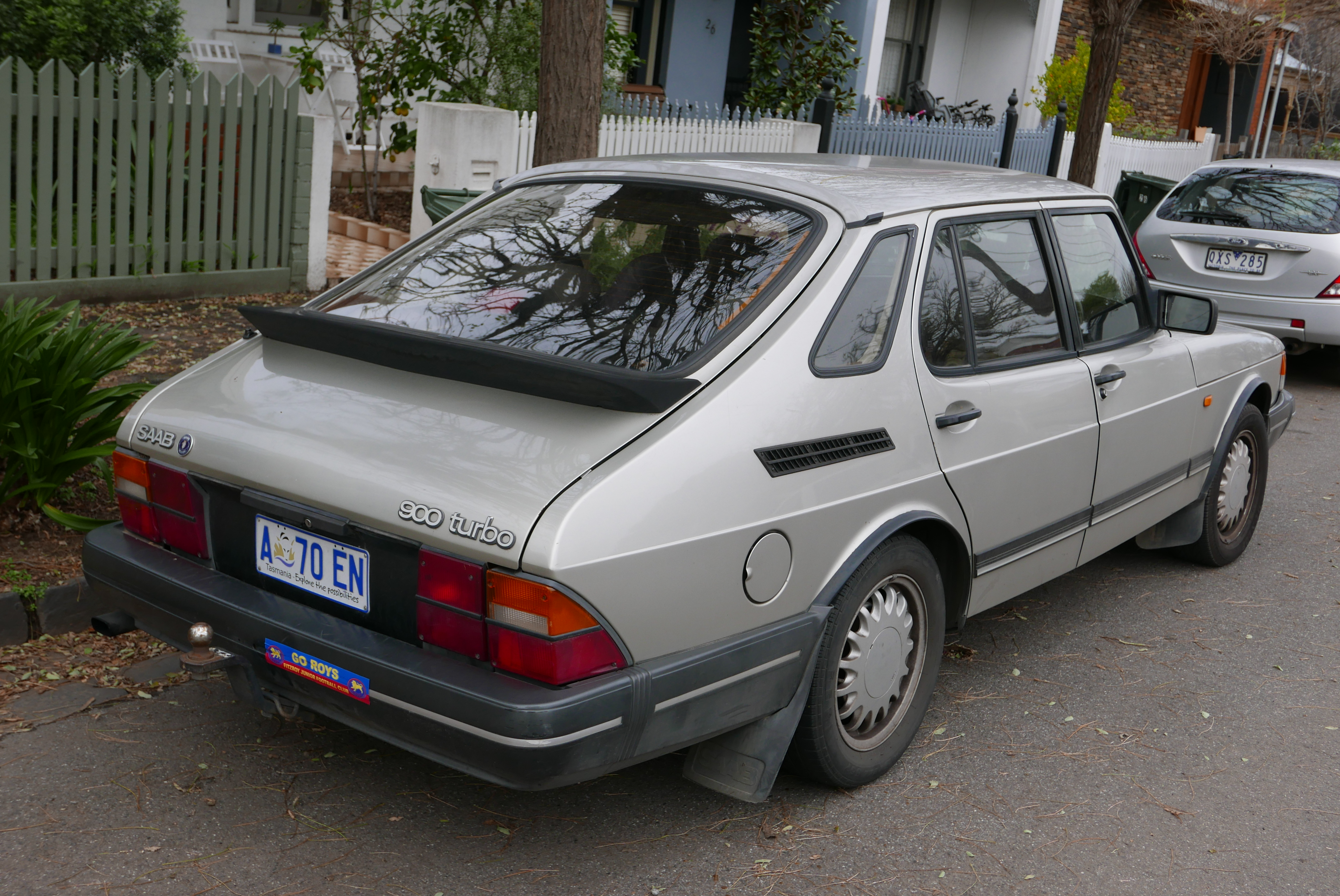
Saab 900 marketed as a combi coupe

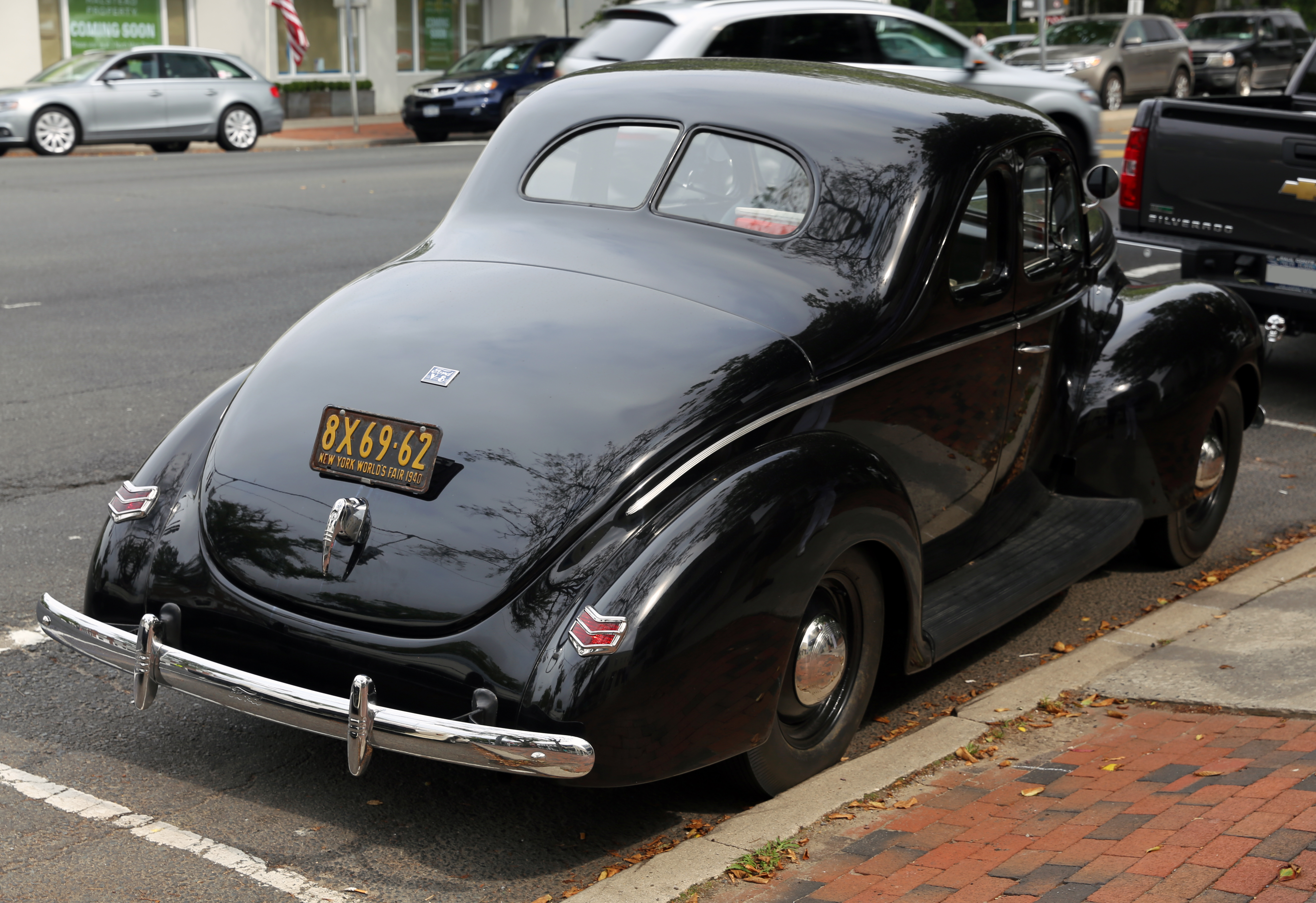
A 1940 Ford Standard business coupe

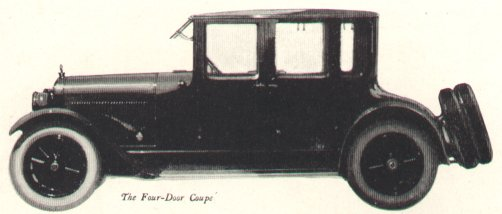
1921 LaFayette Four Door Coupe

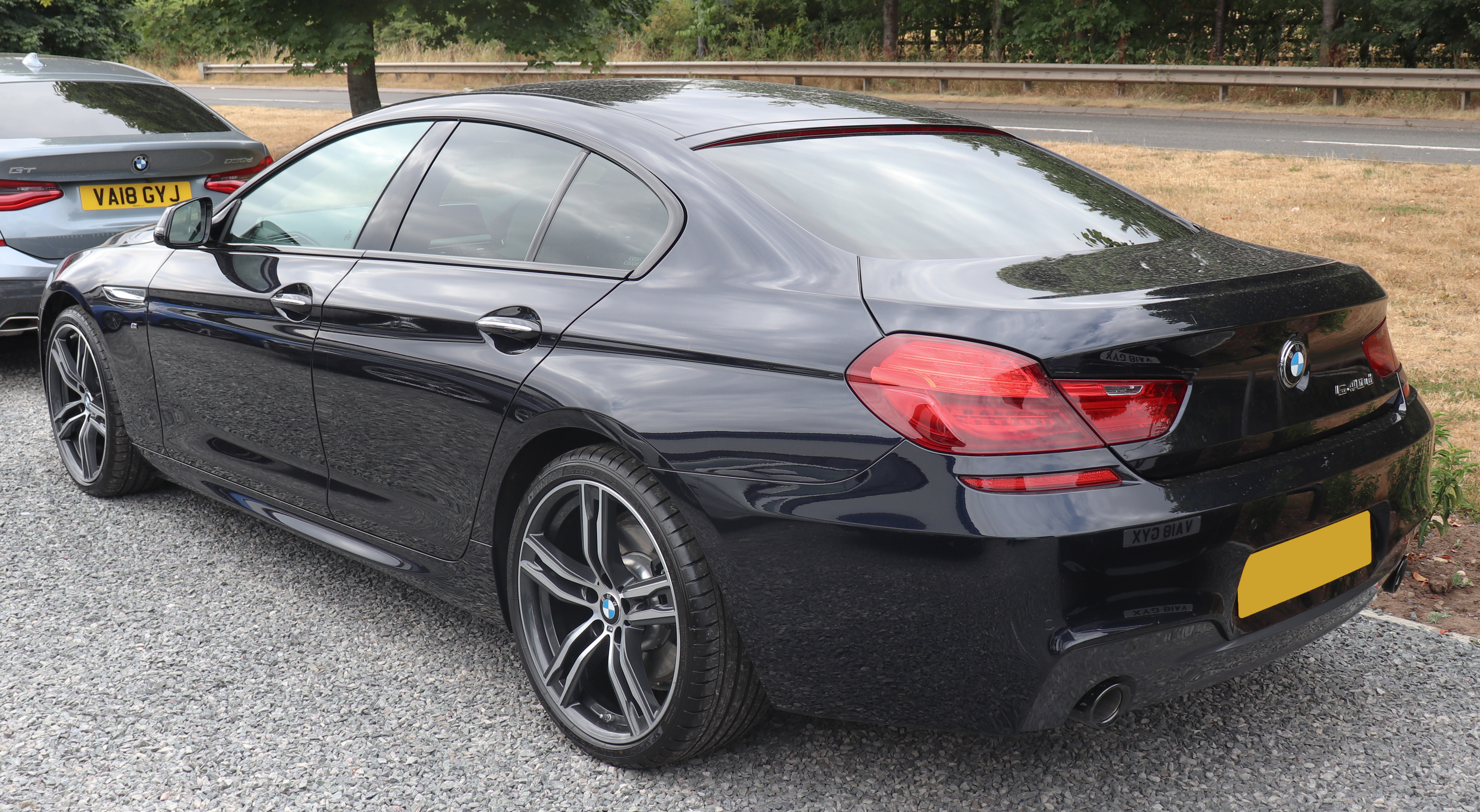
BMW 6 Series as a modern four-door coupe

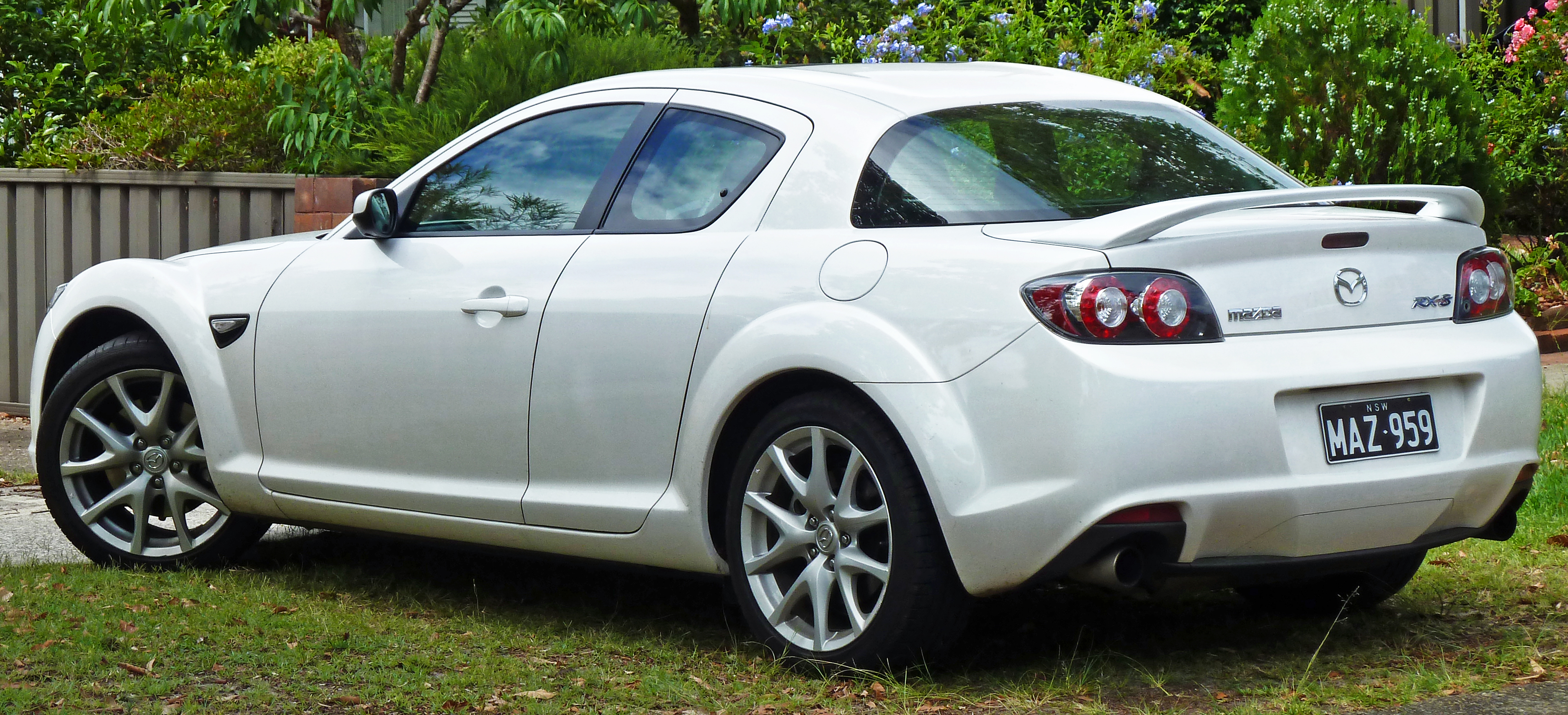
Mazda RX-8 marketed as a quad coupe

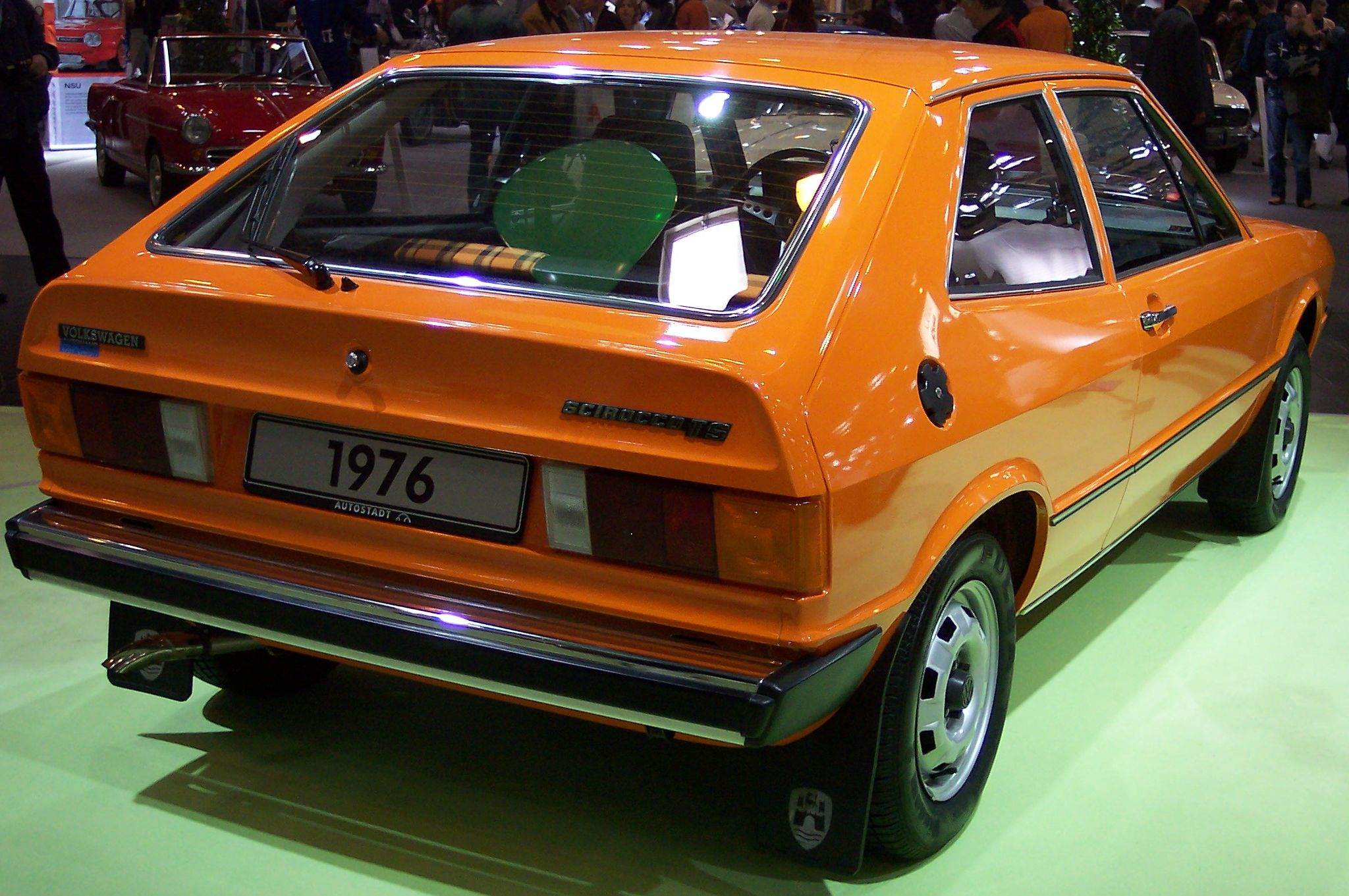
1976 Volkswagen Scirocco, a 3-door hatchback with coupe-inspired styling

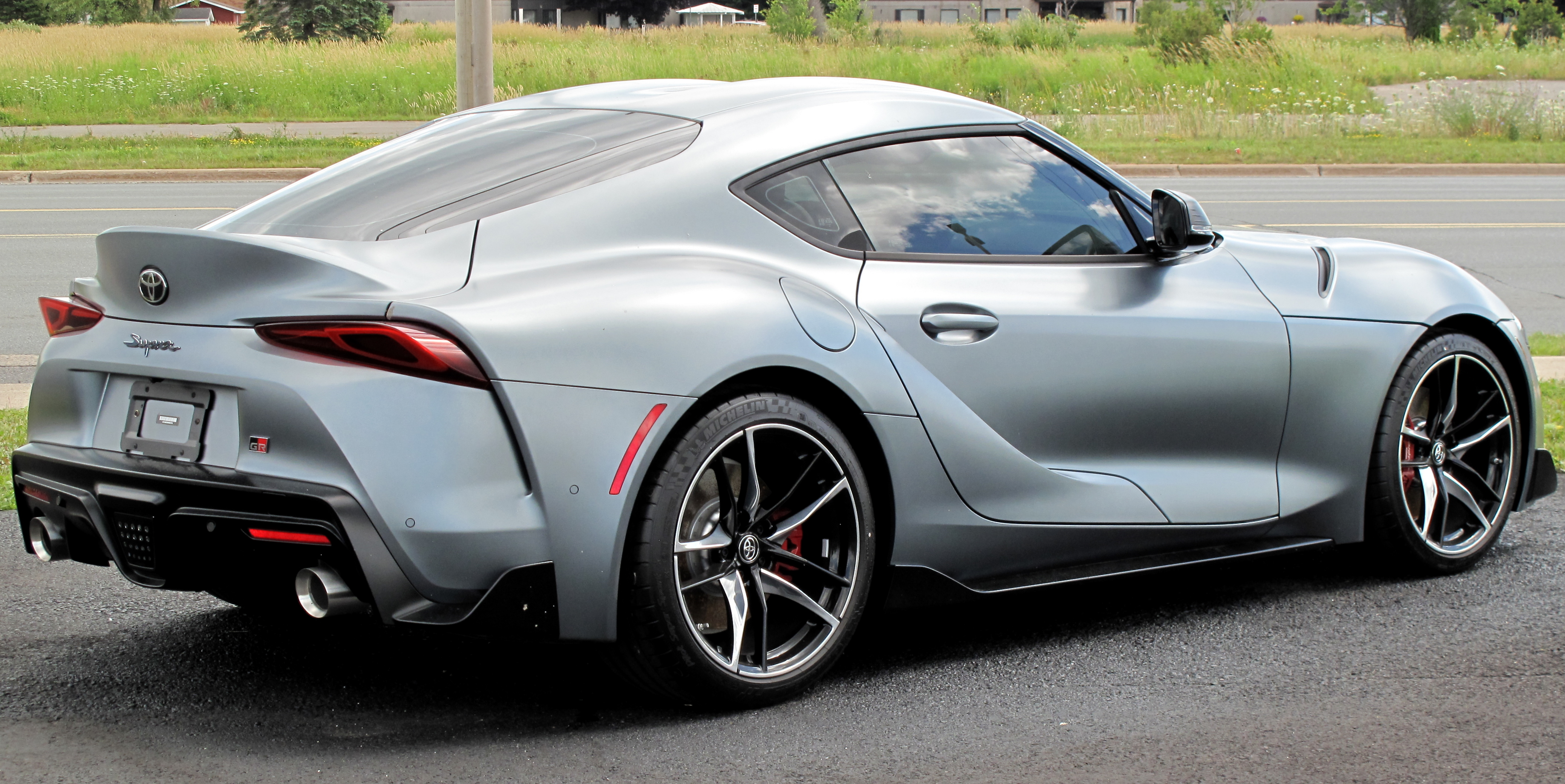
2020 Toyota GR Supra - 3-door liftback/fastback coupe

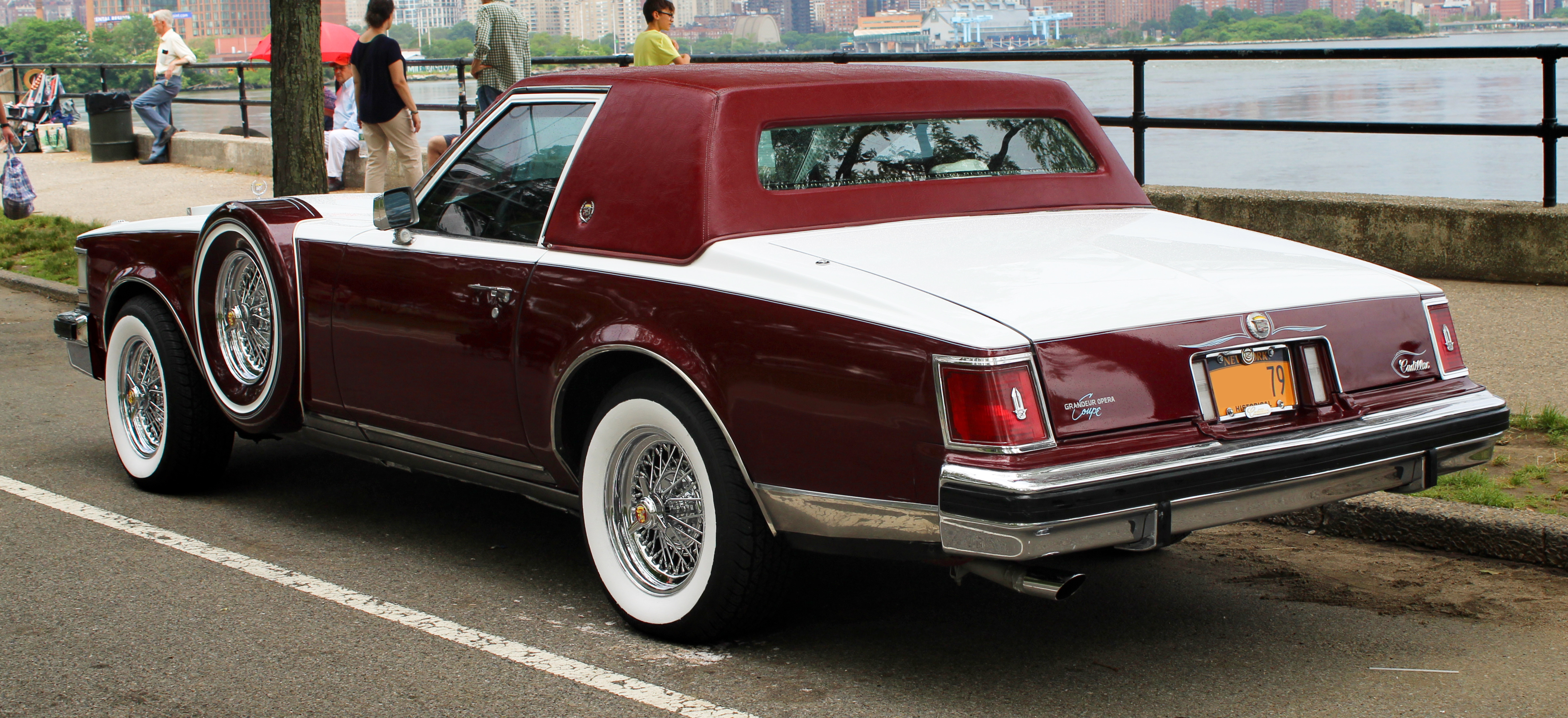
Cadillac Seville Opera Coupe

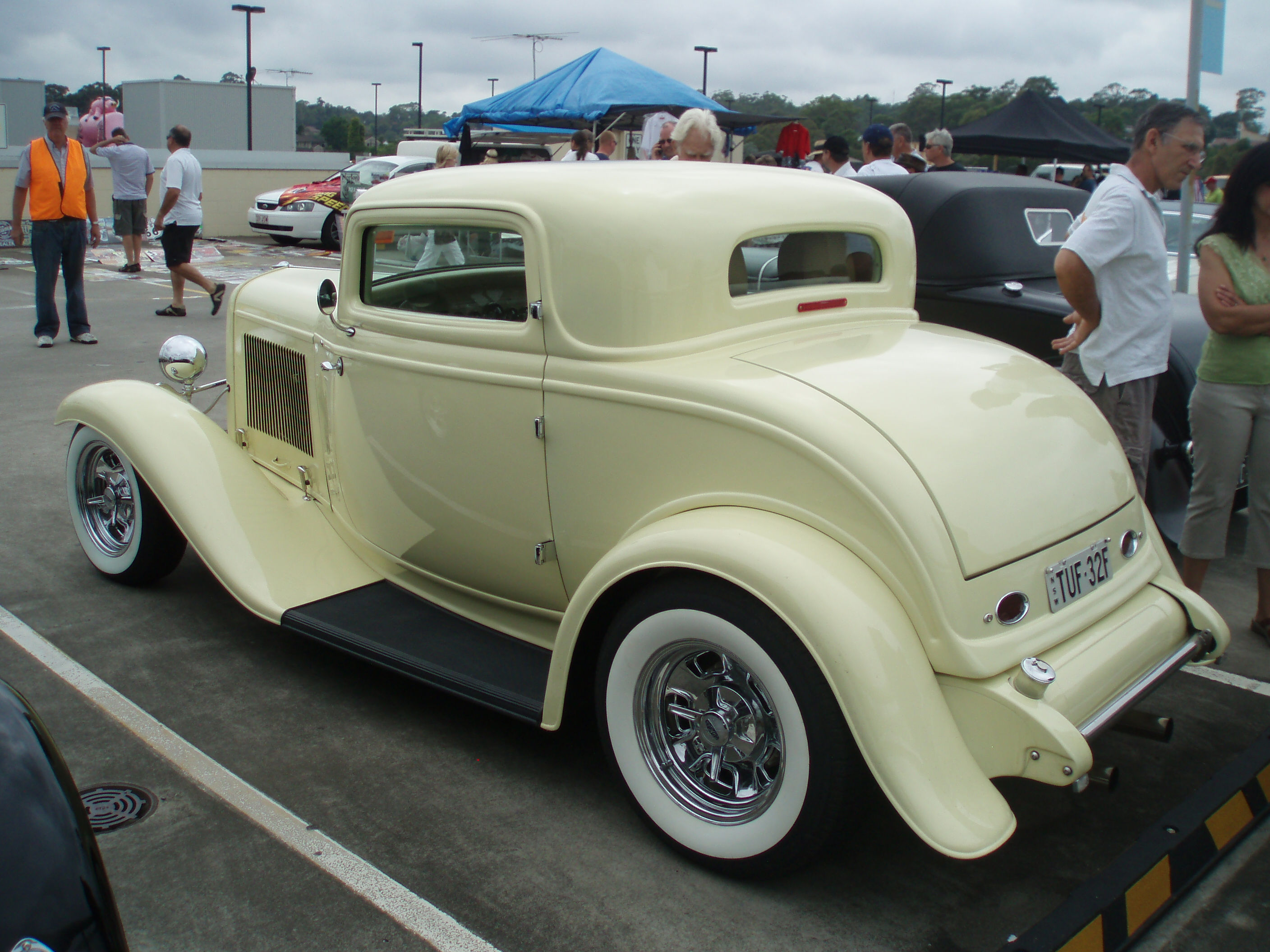
1932 Ford Model 18 - a three-window coupe

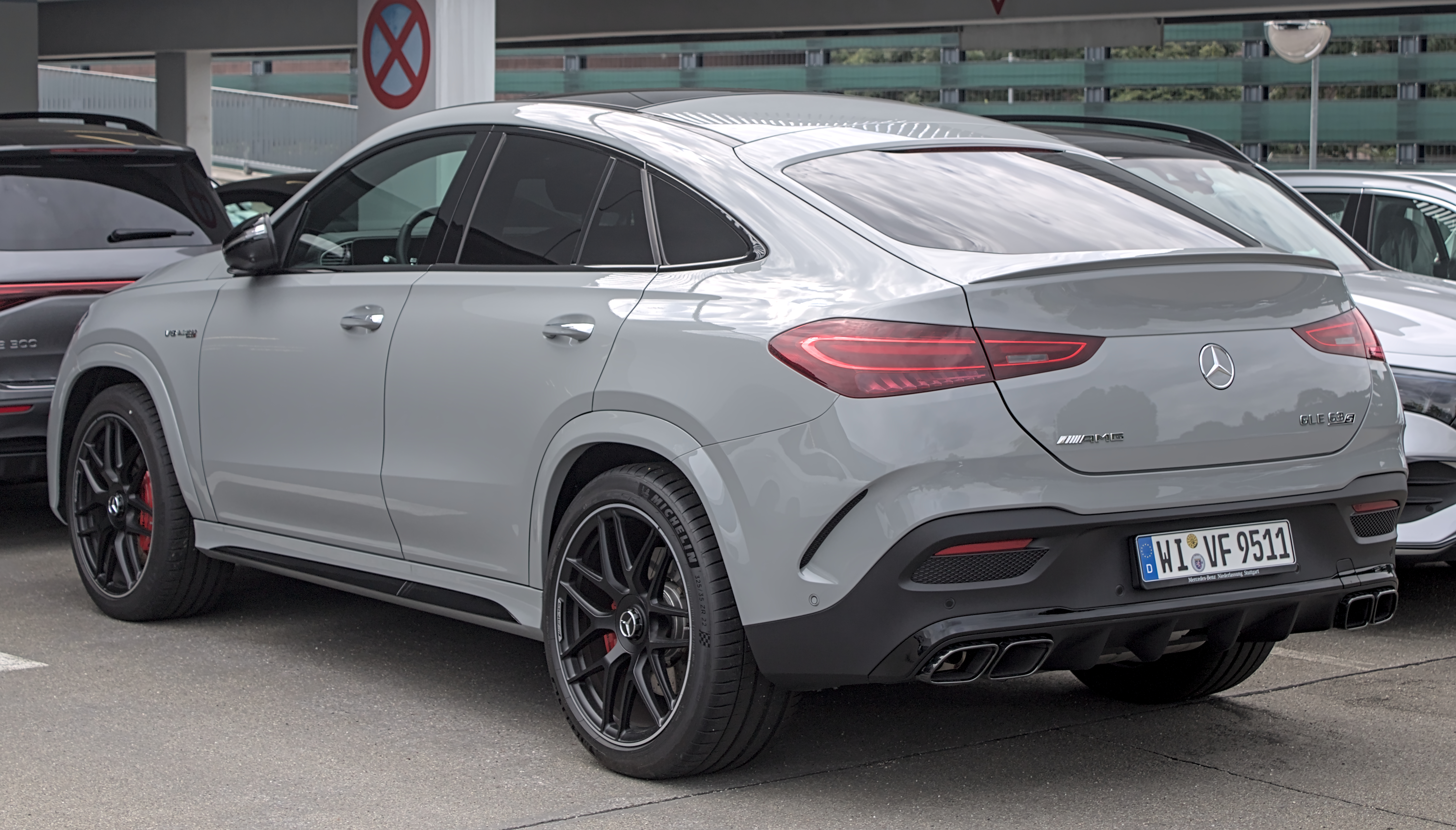
Mercedes-Benz GLE coupe

== Positioning in model range ==
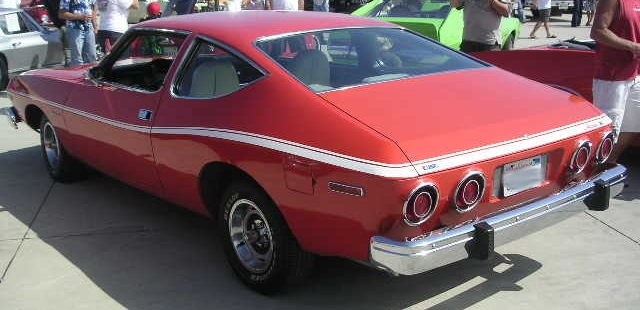
1974–1978 AMC Matador coupe

In the United States, some coupes are "simply line-extenders two-door variants of family sedans", while others have significant differences from their four-door counterparts.

The AMC Matador coupe (1974–1978) has a shorter wheelbase with a distinct aerodynamic design and fastback styling, sharing almost nothing with the conventional three-box design and more "conservative" four-door versions.

Similarly, the Chrysler Sebring and Dodge Stratus coupes and sedans (late-1990 through 2000s), have little in common except their names. The coupes were engineered by Mitsubishi and built in Illinois, while the sedans were developed by Chrysler and built in Michigan. Some coupes may share platforms with contemporary sedans.

Coupes may also exist as model lines in their own right, either closely related to other models, but named differently – such as the Alfa Romeo GT or Infiniti Q60 – or have little engineering in common with other vehicles from the manufacturer – such as the Toyota GT86.

== See also ==
- Convertible
- Grand tourer
- Coupé de Ville
