= Mercedes-Benz R-Class =

Mid-size luxury MPV

Mercedes-Benz R
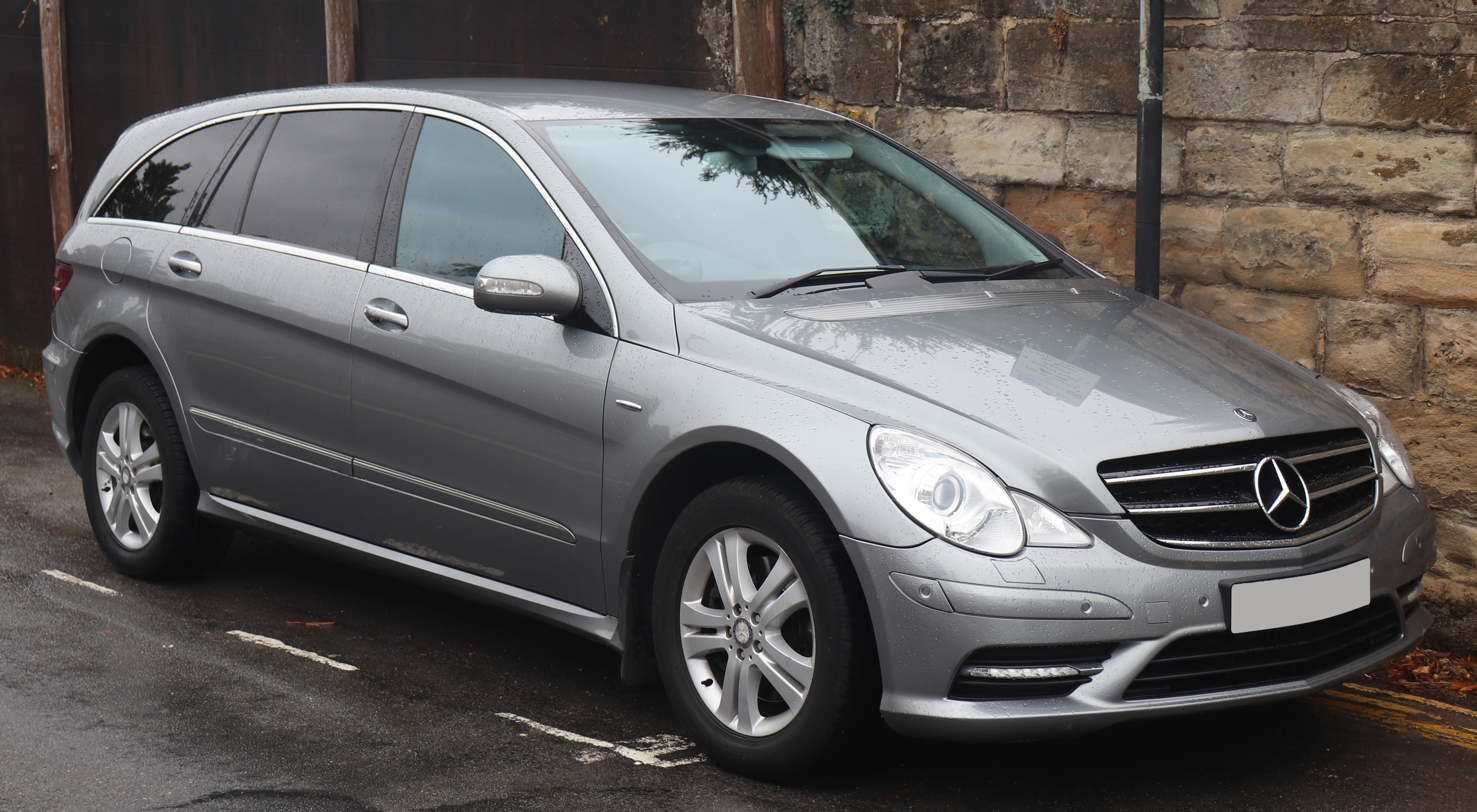
- Mercedes-Benz R 350 Grand Edition

Overview
- Manufacturer: DaimlerChrysler (2004–2007); Daimler AG (2007–2017)
- Model code: W251 (SWB); V251 (LWB)
- Production: August 2004–September 2017
- Model years: 2006–2013 (worldwide); 2014–2017 (China)
- Assembly: United States: Vance, Alabama (2005–2014); Mishawaka, Indiana (AM General: 2015–2017)

Body and chassis
- Class: Mid-size luxury MPV
- Body style: 5-door estate
- Layout: Front-engine, rear-wheel-drive / four-wheel-drive
- Platform: W164/V251/W166
- Related: Mercedes-Benz M-Class; Mercedes-Benz GL-Class; SsangYong Rodius

Powertrain
- Engine: 3.0 L M 272 V6; 3.0 L M 276 V6; 3.5 L M 272 V6; 3.5 L M 276 V6; 5.0 L M 113 V8; 5.5 L M 273 V8; 6.2 L M 156 V8; 3.0 L OM 642 V6 diesel
- Transmission: 7-speed 7G-Tronic automatic 7-speed 7G-Tronic Plus automatic

Dimensions
- Wheelbase: SWB: 2,980 mm (117.3 in); LWB: 3,215 mm (126.6 in)
- Length: SWB: 4,922 mm (193.8 in); LWB: 5,156 mm (203.0 in)
- Width: 2006–2008: 1,922 mm (75.7 in); 2009–2017: 1,958 mm (77.1 in)
- Height: SWB (2006–2008): 1,674 mm (65.9 in); LWB (2009–2017): 1,661 mm (65.4 in)
- Curb weight: 2,130–2,375 kg (4,696–5,236 lb)

Chronology
- Successor: Mercedes-Benz VLS

The Mercedes-Benz R-Class is a mid-size luxury MPV introduced by Mercedes-Benz in 2005 for the 2006 model year. Following the success of the smaller A- and B-Class MPVs, Mercedes in collaboration with coachbuilder Stola presented a concept vehicle, Vision GST (Grand Sports Tourer), at the 2002 Detroit Auto Show and a second one, Vision R presented at the 2004 Detroit Auto Show, subsequently introducing the production version at 2005 New York International Auto Show. The R-Class was manufactured in Vance, Alabama until 2015 when its production was shifted to Mishawaka, Indiana for a smaller volume production until 2017.

The R-Class (W251) shared its platform with the M-Class (W164) and GL-Class (X164) and was available in two wheelbase lengths: standard 2,980 mm (117.3 in) and long 3,215 mm (126.6 in). The R-Class was sold in the United States and Canada in long wheelbase only. The R-Class in both standard and long wheelbases were sold internationally until the end of 2013 with exception of China where R 320 and R 400 with long wheelbase continued to be sold until 2017.

== Updates ==
=== 2007 changes ===
Mercedes-Benz announced in May 2007 that the R-Class model range would be expanded with more engine options and availability of rear-wheel-drive system for selected models in addition to 4MATIC all-wheel-drive system. A new smaller 3.0-litre V6 was available in both petrol and diesel versions. The seating options became more flexible, offering five, six, or seven seats. AMG styling option was added to the extensive list of standard and extra-cost options.

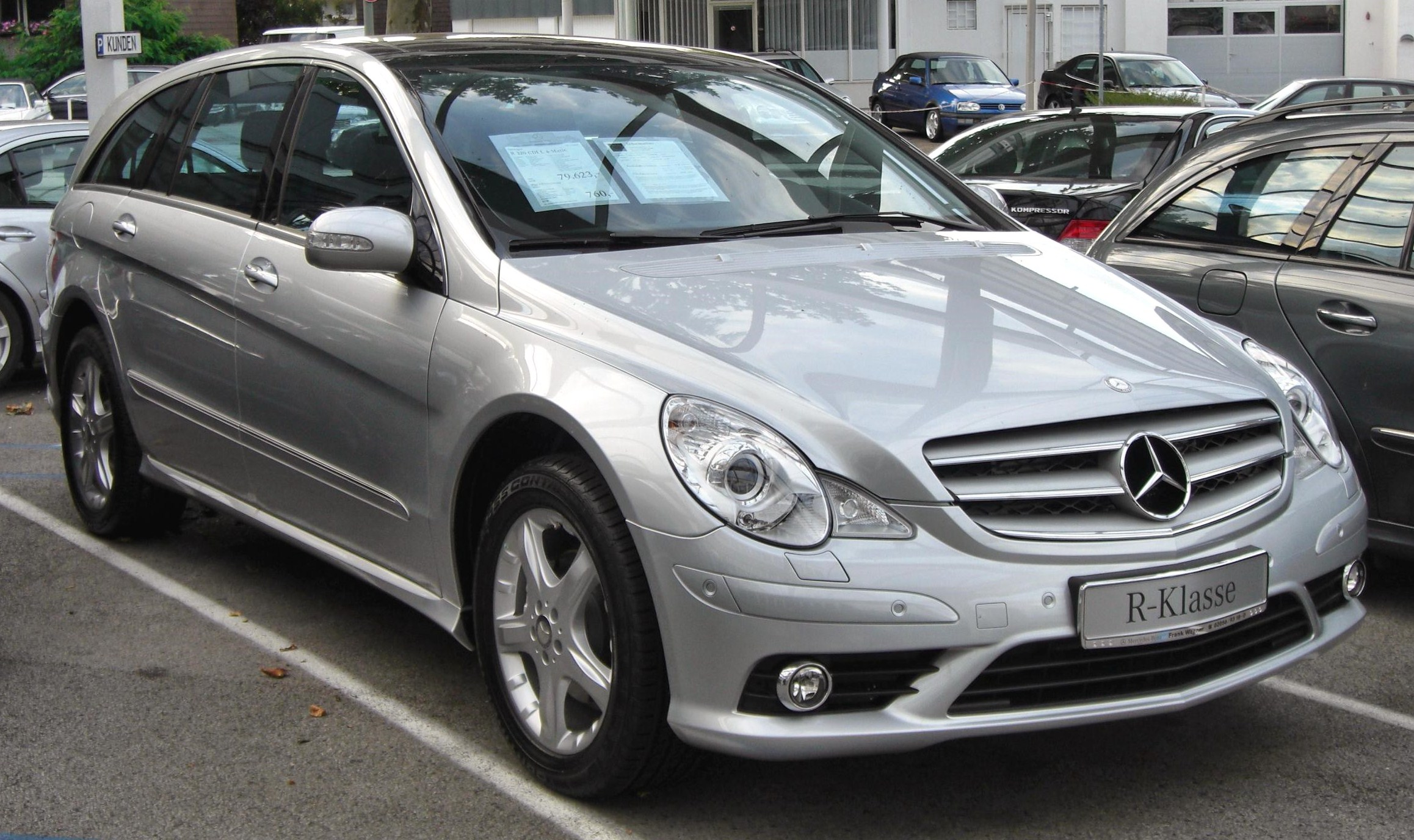
First facelift R320 CDI L with the AMG Line Package

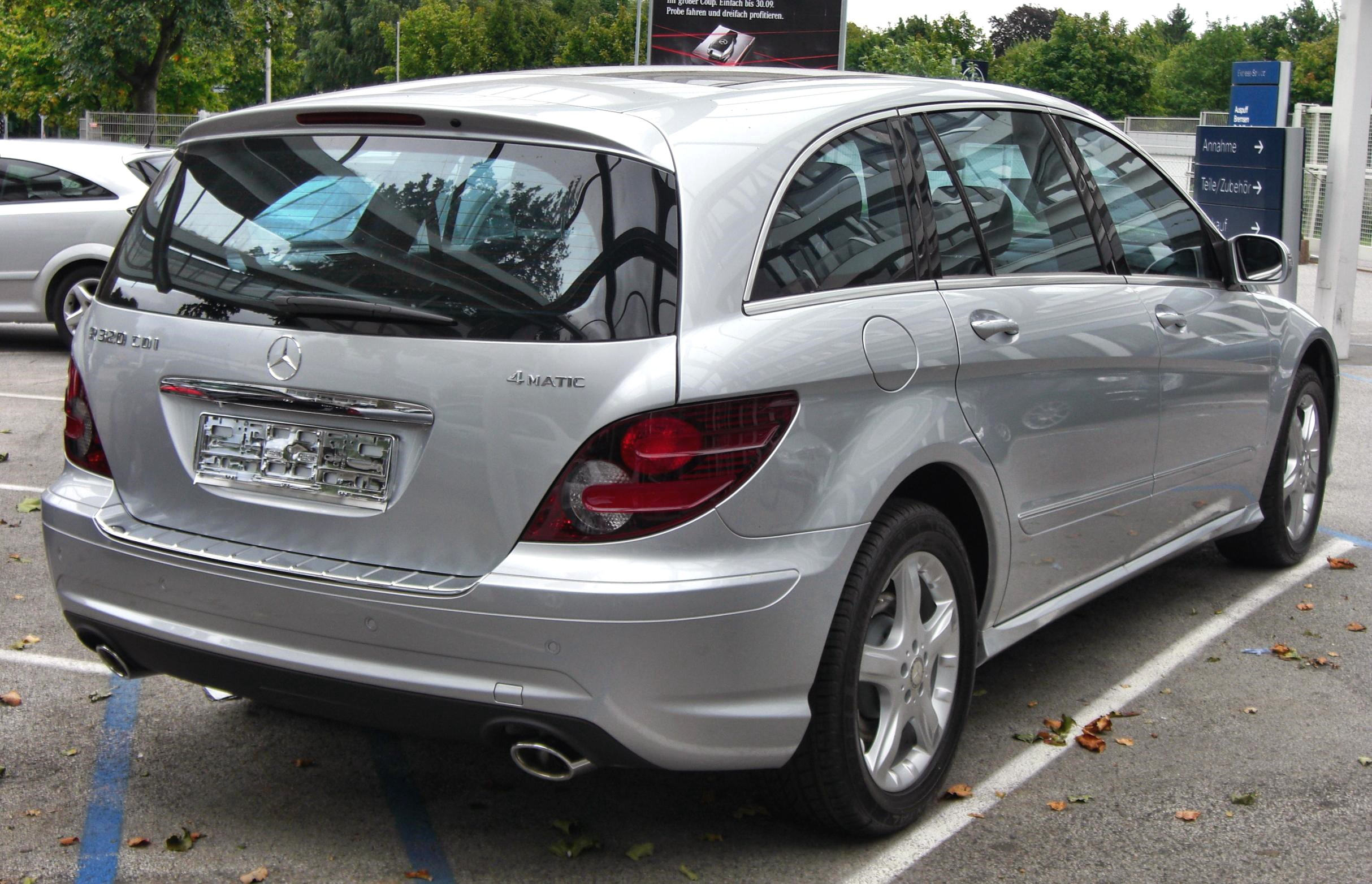
First facelift R320 CDI L with the AMG Line Package Rear

=== 2010 changes ===
The R-Class received a major update with facelift to the front and rear fascias, grille, side mirrors, and taillights for the model year 2011. The revised model was unveiled at the 2010 New York International Auto Show.

At the same time, the new 5.5-litre V8 motor was introduced to R-Class for the first time since the last R-Class with V8 motors, R 500 and R 63 AMG, were withdrawn from the market in 2007. The reintroduced R 500 was not offered in the North American market. The North American market continued with R 350 4MATIC and R 350 BlueTEC 4MATIC, both in long wheelbase form and with V6 engines only, for 2011 and 2012.

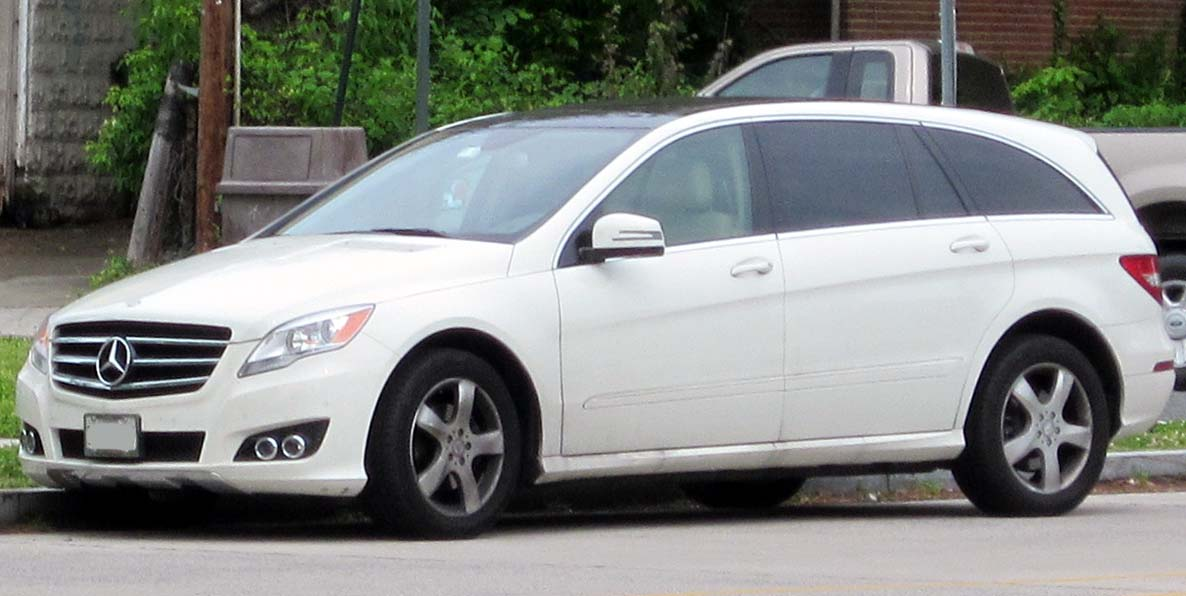
2011–2012 Mercedes-Benz R-Class (US)

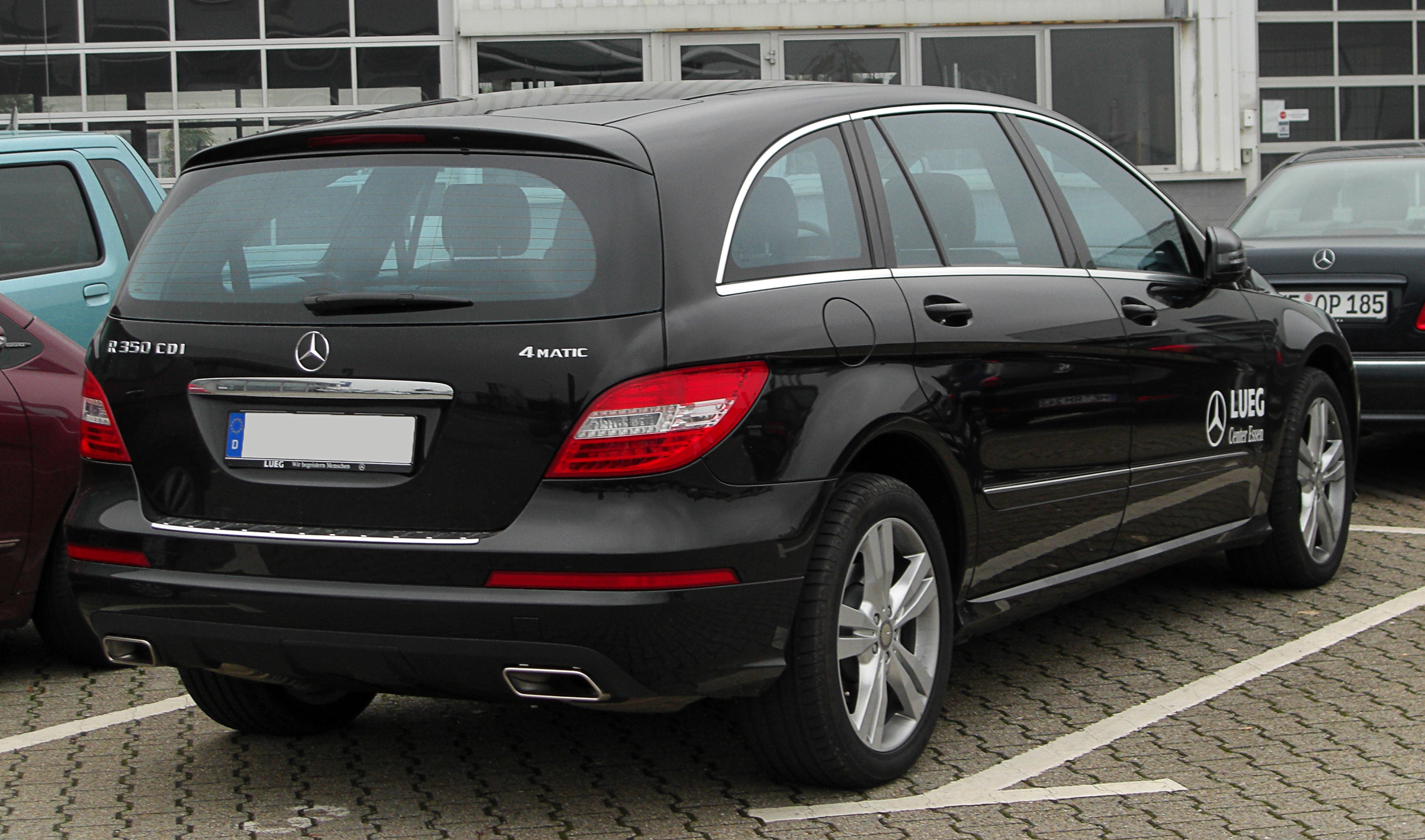
2011–2012 Mercedes-Benz R-Class Rear

== R 63 AMG 4MATIC ==
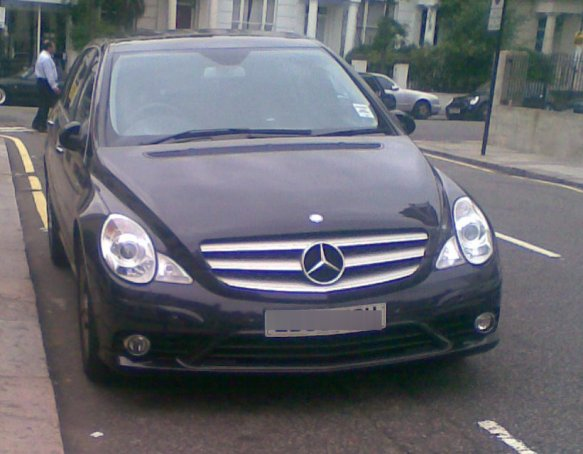
Mercedes-Benz R 63 AMG 4MATIC

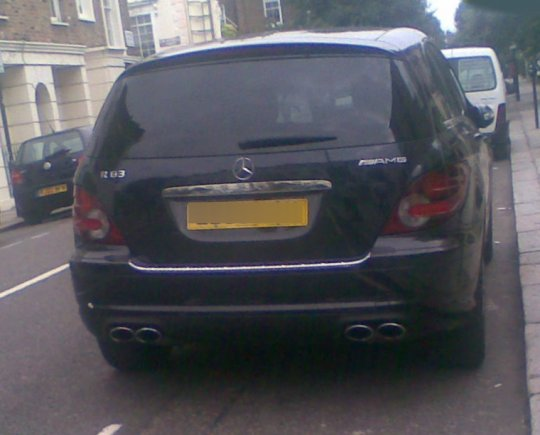
Mercedes-Benz R 63 AMG 4MATIC

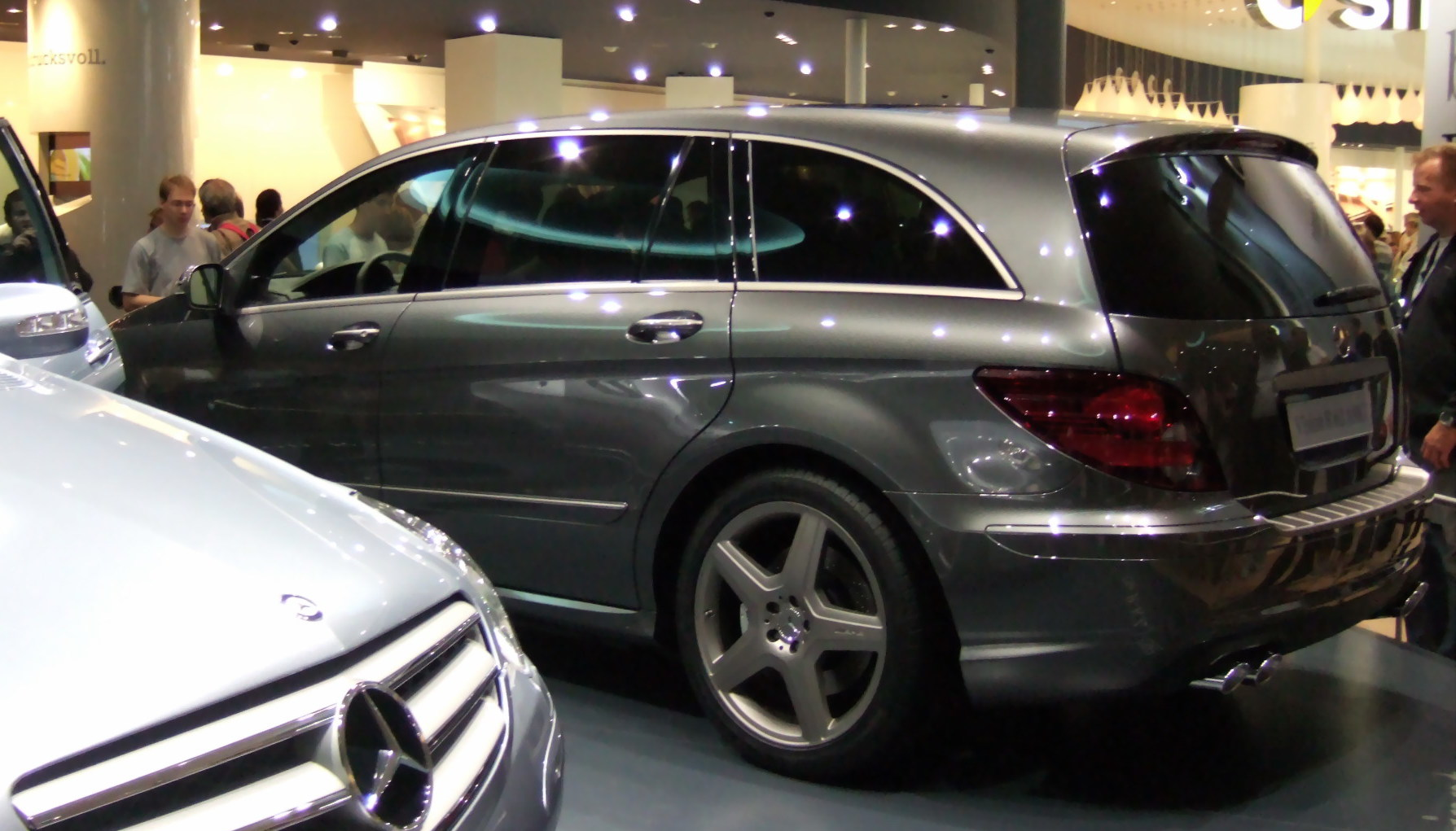
Mercedes-Benz R 63 AMG 4MATIC

The AMG version of the W251, R 63 AMG 4MATIC, was introduced at the 2006 North American International Auto Show as a 2007 model. It featured a handbuilt 6.2-litre M156 E 63 V8 engine producing 375 kW (510 PS; 503 bhp) and 630 N⋅m (465 lb⋅ft) of torque. The R 63 AMG was equipped with same engine, seven-speed AMG Speedshift 7G-TRONIC, and 4MATIC all-wheel-drive system from ML 63 AMG and GL 63 AMG. The driver can manually select the gears by pressing the upshift and downshift buttons placed behind the steering wheel spokes if desired. No rear-wheel-drive option was offered in R 63 AMG 4MATIC. The top speed is electronically restricted to 250 km/h (155 mph) or 275 km/h (171 mph) with optional extra-charge AMG Driver's Package. Despite its heavy weight, the acceleration was brisk with 0–100 km/h (0–62 mph) time of 4.6 seconds.

A high performance version of R-Class wasn't well-received due to its poor handling dynamics, especially with the heavy V8 engine. With 200 units built for the worldwide sale, this model was the rarest of R-Class and amongst the rarest AMG models. Due to extremely low sales and the lack of advertisement, R 63 AMG was withdrawn from the market in 2007, making it a single model year.

== Chinese market ==
From 2014 to 2017, the long wheelbase R-Class was sold in China only with one engine option in two different power outputs: R 320 4MATIC and R 400 4MATIC. The R-Class enjoyed a steady popularity in China with annual sales between 12,000 and 14,000 units per year. Due to its small sales volume, the production was shifted from Alabama to Indiana where the R-Class for Chinese market was assembled by contract manufacturer AM General from 2015 to 2017.

== Technical data ==
=== Powertrains ===
The entry with (Long) in parentheses denotes availability in both standard and long wheelbases. Otherwise, the entry shows the standard wheelbase only. The Long without parentheses denotes long-wheelbase version only. The asterisk next to the figures denotes the long-wheelbase R-Class. The double asterisk denotes the optional extra-cost AMG Driver's Package.

Model	Years	Configuration	Displacement	Power	Torque	0–100 km/h (0–62 mph)	Top Speed (km/h)	Fuel Consumption/Efficiency (EU-Norm combined)
Petrol engines
R 280	2007–2009	V6 (M272 KE 30)	2996 cc	172 kW (234 PS; 231 bhp) at 5,000 rpm	300 N⋅m (221 lb⋅ft) at 1,300–4,500 rpm	9.6 seconds 9.7 seconds*	222 km/h (138 mph)	10.9 L/100 km (21.6 mpg_{‑US}); 10.9 L/100 km (21.6 mpg_{‑US})*
R 300	2009–2013	V6 (M272 KE 30)	2996 cc	172 kW (234 PS; 231 bhp) at 5,000 rpm	300 N⋅m (221 lb⋅ft) at 1,300–4,500 rpm	9.6 seconds	222 km/h (138 mph)	11.0 L/100 km (21.4 mpg_{‑US})
R 320 4MATIC Long (China only)	2014–2017	V6 (M 276 DEH 30 LA red.)	2996 cc	200 kW (272 PS; 268 bhp) at 5,000 rpm	400 N⋅m (295 lb⋅ft) at 1,300–4,500 rpm	7.8 seconds	240 km/h (149 mph)	10.5 L/100 km (22 mpg_{‑US})
R 350 (Long)	2007—2010 (2008, US)	V6 (M 272 KE 35)	3498 cc	200 kW (272 PS; 268 bhp) at 6,000 rpm	350 N⋅m (258 lb⋅ft) at 2,400–5,000 rpm	8.1 seconds 8.2 seconds*	234 km/h (145 mph)	11.3–11.5 L/100 km (20.8–20.5 mpg_{‑US})
R 350 4MATIC (Long)	2006—2013 (2006–2012, U.S.)	V6 (M 272 KE 35)	3498 cc	200 kW (272 PS; 268 bhp) at 6,000 rpm	350 N⋅m (258 lb⋅ft) at 2,400–5,000 rpm	8.3 seconds 8.4 seconds*	230 km/h (143 mph)	11.6–11.9 L/100 km (20.3–19.8 mpg_{‑US})
R 350 4MATIC BlueEFFICIENCY (Long)	2012–2014	V6 (M 276 DES 35)	3498 cc	225 kW (306 PS; 302 bhp) at 6,500 rpm	370 N⋅m (273 lb⋅ft) at 3,500–5,250 rpm	7.8 seconds 7.9 seconds*	245 km/h (152 mph)	10.0–10.1 L/100 km (24–23 mpg_{‑US})
R 400 4MATIC Long (China only)	2014–2017	V6 (M 276 DEH 30 LA)	2996 cc	245 kW (333 PS; 329 bhp) at 5,250–6,000 rpm	480 N⋅m (354 lb⋅ft) at 3,600–4,000 rpm	6.7 seconds	250 km/h (155 mph)	10.5 L/100 km (22 mpg_{‑US})
R 500 4MATIC (Long)	2006–2007 (2006–2007, U.S.)	V8 (M 113 E 50)	4966 cc	225 kW (306 PS; 302 bhp) at 5,600 rpm	460 N⋅m (339 lb⋅ft) at 2,700–4,250 rpm	6.9 seconds	245 km/h (152 mph)	13.2 L/100 km (17.8 mpg_{‑US})
R 500 4MATIC (Long)*	2010–2014	V8 (M 273 KE 55)	5461 cc	285 kW (387 PS; 382 bhp) at 6,000 rpm	530 N⋅m (391 lb⋅ft) at 2,800–4,800 rpm	6.1 seconds 6.3 seconds*	250 km/h (155 mph)	13.2–13.4 L/100 km (17.8–17.6 mpg_{‑US})
R 63 4MATIC (Long)	2007 (2007, US)	V8 (M 156 E 63)	6208 cc	375 kW (510 PS; 503 bhp) at 6,800 rpm	630 N⋅m (465 lb⋅ft) at 5,200 rpm	5.0 seconds 5.1 seconds*	250 km/h (155 mph); 275 km/h (171 mph)**	16.3 L/100 km (14.4 mpg_{‑US})
Diesel engines
R 280 CDI 4MATIC	2007–2009	V6 (OM 642 DE 30 LA red.)	2987 cc	140 kW (190 PS; 188 bhp) at 4,000 rpm	440 N⋅m (325 lb⋅ft) at 1,400–2,800 rpm	9.8 seconds	210 km/h (130 mph)	9.3 L/100 km (25 mpg_{‑US})
R 280 CDI (Long)	2007–2009	V6 (OM 642 DE 30 LA red.)	2987 cc	140 kW (190 PS; 188 bhp) at 4,000 rpm	440 N⋅m (325 lb⋅ft) at 1,400–2,800 rpm	9.7 seconds 9.8 seconds*	210 km/h (130 mph)	9.0 L/100 km (26 mpg_{‑US})
R 300 CDI 4MATIC	2009–2010	V6 (OM 642 DE 30 LA red.)	2987 cc	140 kW (190 PS; 188 bhp) at 4,000 rpm	440 N⋅m (325 lb⋅ft) at 1,400–2,800 rpm	9.8 seconds	210 km/h (130 mph)	9.3–9.5 L/100 km (25–25 mpg_{‑US})
R 300 CDI BlueEfficiency (Long)	2009–2012	V6 (OM 642 DE 30 LA red.)	2987 cc	140 kW (190 PS; 188 bhp) at 4,000 rpm	440 N⋅m (325 lb⋅ft) at 1,400–2,800 rpm	9.5 seconds 9.8 seconds*	215 km/h (134 mph); 210 km/h (130 mph)*	7.6–7.8 L/100 km (31–30 mpg_{‑US}); 8.6 L/100 km (27 mpg_{‑US})*
R 320 CDI (Long)	2006–2009	V6 (OM 642 DE 30 LA)	2987 cc	165 kW (224 PS; 221 bhp) at 3,800 rpm	510 N⋅m (376 lb⋅ft) at 1,600–2,400 rpm	8.7 seconds 8.8 seconds*	222 km/h (138 mph)	8.7 L/100 km (27 mpg_{‑US}); 8.8 L/100 km (27 mpg_{‑US})*
R 320 CDI 4MATIC (Long)	2006–2009 (2007–2009, U.S.)	V6 (OM 642 DE 30 LA)	2987 cc	165 kW (224 PS; 221 bhp) at 3,800 rpm	510 N⋅m (376 lb⋅ft) at 1,600–2,400 rpm	8.7 seconds 8.8 seconds*	222 km/h (138 mph)	8.7 L/100 km (27 mpg_{‑US}); 8.8 L/100 km (27 mpg_{‑US})*
R 350 BlueTec 4MATIC Long	2009–2012 (2010–2012, U.S.)	V6 (OM 642 DE 30 LA)	2987 cc	155 kW (211 PS; 208 bhp) at 3,400 rpm	540 N⋅m (398 lb⋅ft) at 1,600–2,400 rpm	8.9 seconds	220 km/h (137 mph)	8.4–8.5 L/100 km (28–28 mpg_{‑US})
R 350 CDI 4MATIC (Long)	2009–2010	V6 (OM 642 DE 30 LA)	2987 cc	165 kW (224 PS; 221 bhp) at 3,800 rpm	510 N⋅m (376 lb⋅ft) at 1,600–2,400 rpm	8.7 seconds 8.8 seconds*	222 km/h (138 mph)	8.5 L/100 km (28 mpg_{‑US})
R 350 CDI 4MATIC (Long)	2010–2012	V6 (OM 642 LS DE 30 LA)	2987 cc	195 kW (265 PS; 261 bhp) at 3,800 rpm	620 N⋅m (457 lb⋅ft) at 1,600–2,400 rpm	7.6 seconds	235 km/h (146 mph)	8.5 L/100 km (28 mpg_{‑US})

- R 500 was sold with 5.5L in the U.S., Canada as the R 550.

=== Transmissions ===
All models except for R 350 4MATIC BlueEFFICIENCY, R 400 4MATIC, R 300 CDI BlueEfficiency, and R 350 BlueTEC 4MATIC use seven-speed 7G-TRONIC automatic transmissions. The latter four models use seven-speed 7G-TRONIC plus automatic transmission.

== Safety and security ==
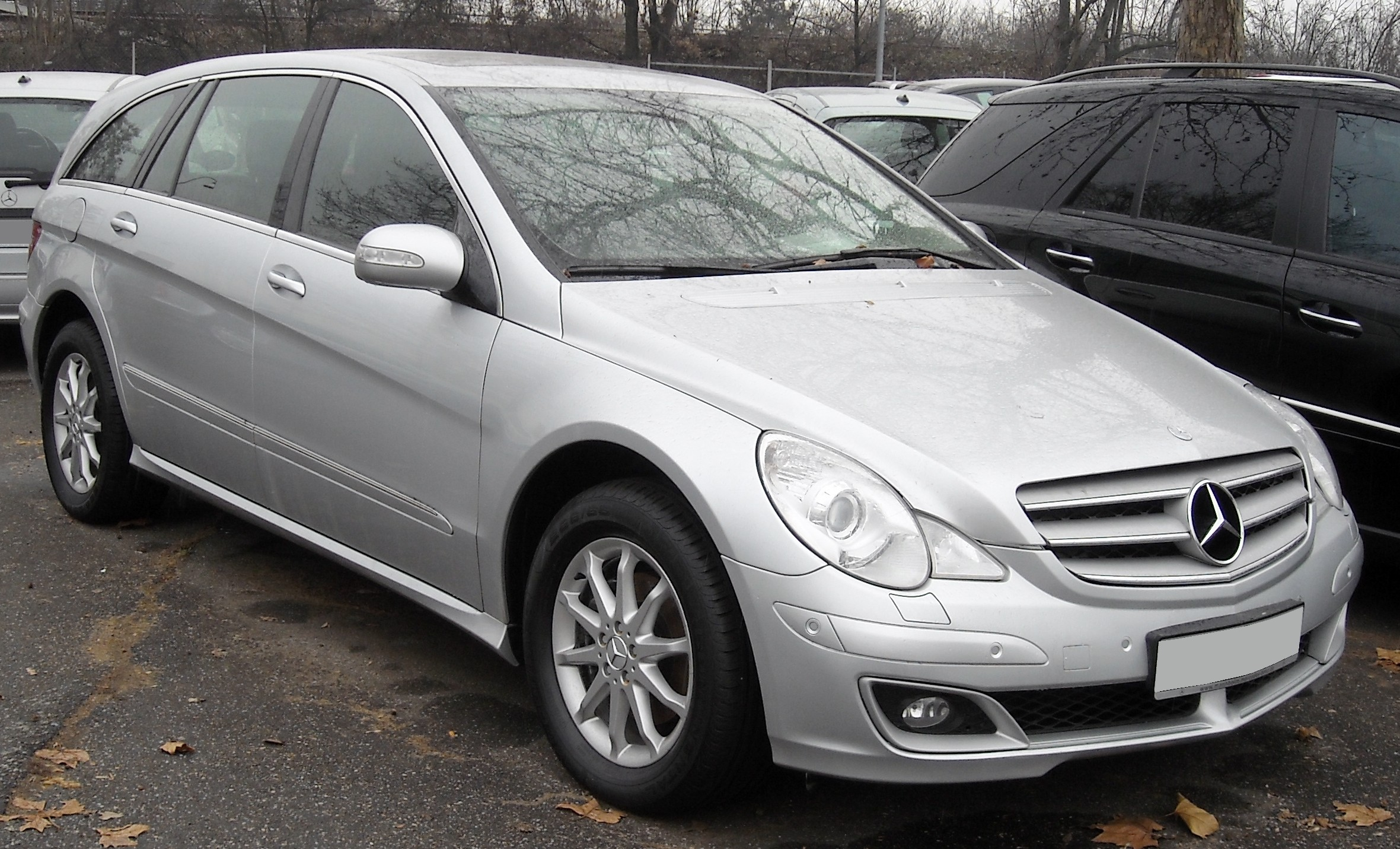
Pre-facelift Mercedes-Benz V251

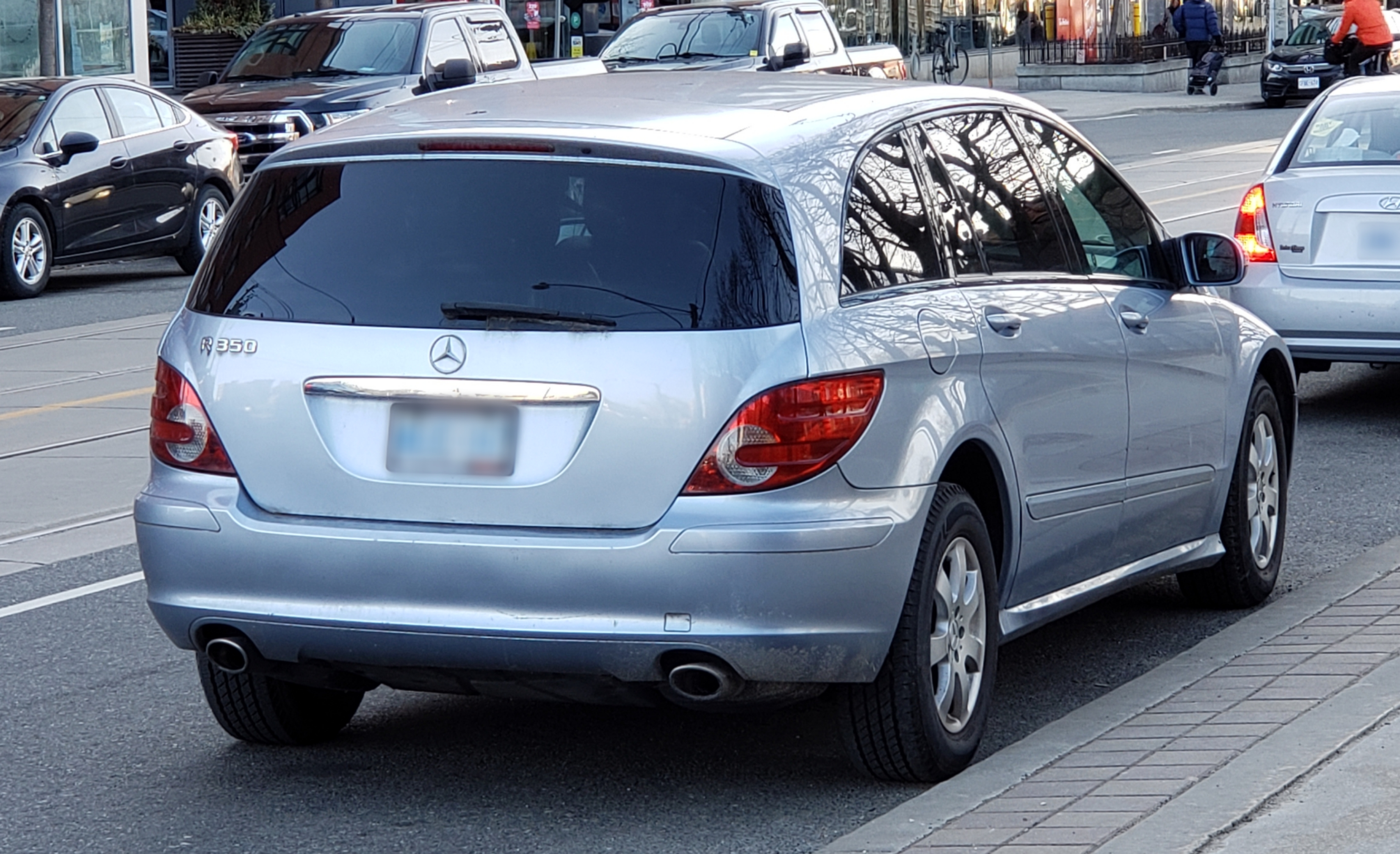
Pre-facelift Mercedes-Benz R350

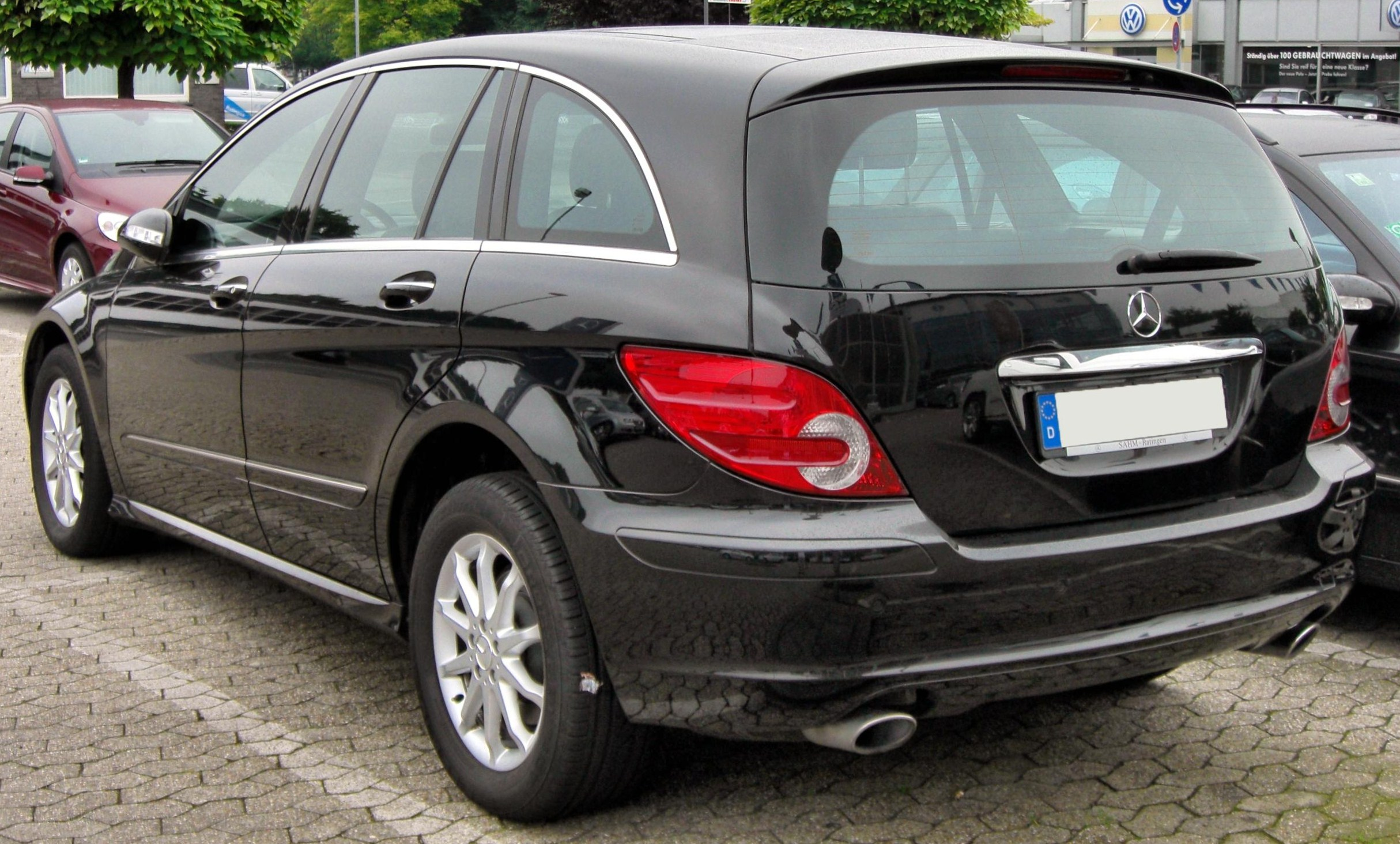
Pre-facelift Mercedes-Benz W251 Rear

The R-Class scored "Good" in the Insurance Institute for Highway Safety (IIHS) front crash test but "Acceptable" in the side impact crash test due to the excessive load against the dummy's torso. After modifying the seatbelts and interior door trim for the 2009 model year, the IIHS rated the R-class "Good" overall in side impacts allowing the R-Class to receive the Top Safety Pick award.

In the United Kingdom, Thatcham Research's New Car Whiplash Ratings (NCWR) tested the R-Class and awarded it the top "Good" rating overall for its ability to protect occupants against whiplash injuries. Thatcham Research's New Vehicle Security Ratings (NVSR) awarded R-Class with five out of five stars for vehicular theft deterrent and four out of five stars for breaking-in deterrent.

== Sales ==
Mercedes targeted 50,000 sales per year, half of those for the North American market. After initial strong sales of first two model years, 2006 and 2007, the sales fell in 2008 following the recession, reaching less than ten percent of ML-Class sales. Sales continued downward, and R-Class was discontinued in 2012 for the North American market and in 2013 for Europe and other markets — with exception of China where R-Class enjoyed popularity. Mercedes-Benz Metris introduced in 2014 is considered a successor to the R-Class for the North American market.

In Germany, the limited engine choices and lack of available rear-wheel-drive option at the launch led to slow sales with almost 4,500 units sold in 2006. The sales decline followed for a few years despite adding more engine choices and rear-wheel-drive option. The 2011 mid-cycle refresh increased the sales to almost 2,500 before dropping to less than 500 units for the final model year, 2013.

Calendar year	2005	2006	2007	2008	2009	2010	2011	2012	2013	2014	2015	2016
US sales	4,959	18,168	13,031	7,733	2,825	2,937	2,385	1,636	30	8	4	
Germany sales	159	4,449	3,967	3,065	1,529	1,679	2,161	1,242	429			
Europe sales	226	11,740	10,735	7,960	4,042	3,507	4,422	2,607	1,133	29	8	3

The cause of its poor sales performance is hard to attribute, considering a multitude of possible reasons. One is the confusing marketing of what the R-Class is: Mercedes-Benz tried to persuade customers that the R-Class represented a new category of luxury passenger vehicle with the attribution of station wagon/estate, crossover, SUV, and van rolled into one. Additionally, Mercedes-Benz initially marketed the R-Class as a "Sports Cruiser" and later as a "Family Tourer". It also suffered from the "image problem" caused by the ill-fated Chrysler Pacifica that looked too similar to the R-Class and was similarly sized despite the R-Class having more luxury features and a better managed launch. The Chrysler Division of its parent company, DaimlerChrysler, had introduced the Pacifica two years prior to the R-Class, and the Pacifica was plagued with production and quality issues as well as poor marketing and few engine choices. Secondly, the customer preference had shifted away from MPV minivans and vans to CUV's and SUV's during the late 2000s and most of the 2010s. Thirdly, the Great Recession of 2008-2009 greatly impacted automotive sales and consumer confidence along with a strong increase in fuel prices, making the R-Class less desirable due to its higher fuel consumption.

The mid-cycle refresh didn't help with sales at all despite an updated fascia appearance more in line with the M-Class and GL-Class and a better interior.
