= Mercedes-Benz SLK-Class (R171) =

Mercedes-Benz SLK (R171)
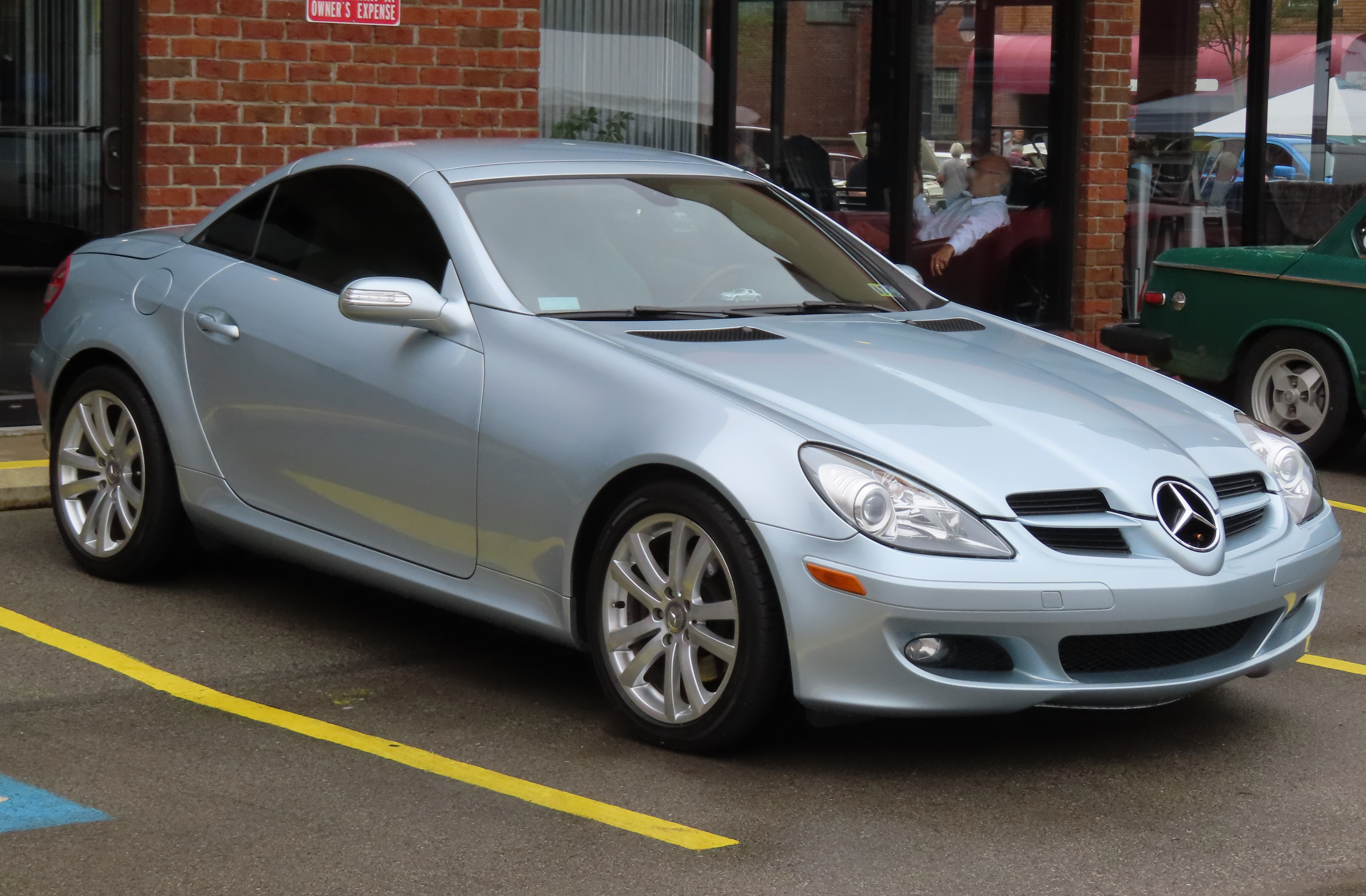

Overview
- Manufacturer: DaimlerChrysler (2004–2007); Daimler AG (2007–2011)
- Production: 2004 – 2011
- Assembly: Germany: Bremen
- Designer: Gorden Wagener (2000)

Body and chassis
- Class: Sports car
- Body style: 2-door retractable hardtop
- Layout: FR layout
- Related: Mercedes-Benz C-Class (W203); Mercedes-Benz CLK-Class (C209)

Powertrain
- Engine: Petrol: 1.8 L M271 supercharged I4; 3.0–3.5 L M272 V6; 5.4 L M113 V8
- Transmission: 6-speed manual 5-speed 5G-Tronic automatic 7-speed 7G-Tronic automatic

Dimensions
- Wheelbase: 2,430 mm (95.7 in)
- Length: 4,087–4,089 mm (161–161 in)
- Width: 1,777–1,794 mm (70–71 in)
- Height: 1,271–1,298 mm (50–51 in)
- Curb weight: 1,390–1,540 kg (3,064–3,395 lb)

Chronology
- Predecessor: Mercedes-Benz SLK-Class (R170)
- Successor: Mercedes-Benz SLK-Class (R172)

The second-generation Mercedes-Benz SLK (R171) is a sports car which was made by Mercedes-Benz from 2004 until 2011 as a part of its SLK series. It is a two-seater roadster with a retractable hardtop and has a front-engine, rear-wheel-drive layout.

It was unveiled at the 74th Geneva International Motor Show. The SLK nameplate refers to its design mission to be Sportlich (sporty), Leicht (light), and Kurz (compact). It was sold in North America for model years 2004-2010.

== History ==
In January 2000, Mercedes revealed the Vision SLA concept car at the Detroit Auto Show. Its body was made of plastic and aluminum, with extremely short overhangs and wheelbase. The front end was reminiscent of the Silver Arrows era and the rear trunk had additional luggage support. The concept car was constructed by Stola in late 1999.

The R171 features a number of revisions compared to its predecessor, the R170: a 30mm longer wheelbase, increased length (72mm) and width (65mm), 40% increased use of high strength steel, seven-speed automatic transmission, adaptive two-stage airbags, head/thorax sidebags and a revised roof mechanism (marketed as the Vario roof) deployable in 22 seconds (previously 25 seconds) with a rotary-pivoting rear window enabling a more compact folded roof stack and trunk storage increased by 63 litres with the roof retracted. Optional features include remote operation of the retractable hardtop as well as an innovative forced air, neck-level heating system integral to the headrests, marketed as Airscarf.

The fully galvanized bodywork, which featured 19 percent improvement in static bending and 46 percent improvement in torsional strength with the roof down, also featured a 3% improvement in aerodynamic efficiency, with a Cd value of 0.32. The design was aerodynamically optimized to minimize interior draughts with the top retracted and included a fabric windblocker which could be pulled up over the two roll-over bars. Mercedes marketed the R171's tapering front end styling by designer Steve Mattin as "Formula One-inspired".

In 2008, the SLK reached sales of 500,000. The R171 made Car and Driver's Ten Best list for 2005 and won the Canadian Car of the Year Best New Convertible award.

The R171 SLK were the last series offering a manual transmission in a 6 Cylinder Mercedes-Benz Convertible. The successor to the R171, R172, only offered manual transmission in their 4-cylinder vehicles.

Car and Driver reviewed the manual transmission in November 2004 and rated the transmission glowingly as "..the love child of a Honda S2000 and BMW M3...". The review further wrote that with the SLK350 the engine "has a willing personality that is perfectly suited to a manual transmission."

== Specifications ==
Model	Years	Engine (code)	Power, torque at rpm	0–100 km/h (62 mph) acceleration (seconds)	Top Speed	Kerb Weight (Automatic)	Standard Transmission	Optional Transmission
SLK 200 Kompressor	2004–2008	1,796 cc (109.6 cu in) I4 supercharged (M271)	163 PS (120 kW; 161 hp) at 5,500, 240 N⋅m (177 lbf⋅ft) at 3,000-4,000	7.9**	229 km/h (142.3 mph)	1,390 kg (3,064 lb) (1,415 kg (3,120 lb))	6-speed manual	5G-Tronic
SLK 200 Kompressor	2008–2011	1,796 cc (109.6 cu in) I4 supercharged (M271)	184 PS (135 kW; 181 hp) at 5,500, 240 N⋅m (177 lbf⋅ft) at 3,000-4,000	7.6**	230 km/h (142.9 mph)	1,390 kg (3,064 lb) (1,415 kg (3,120 lb))	6-speed manual	5G-Tronic
SLK 280	2005–2008	2,996 cc (182.8 cu in) V6 (M272)	231 PS (170 kW; 228 hp), 300 N⋅m (221 lbf⋅ft)	6.7**	250 km/h (155.3 mph)****	1,440 kg (3,175 lb) (1,460 kg (3,219 lb))	6-speed manual	7G-Tronic
SLK 300	2009–2011	2,996 cc (182.8 cu in) V6 (M272)	231 PS (170 kW; 228 hp), 300 N⋅m (221 lbf⋅ft)	6.7**	250 km/h (155.3 mph)****	1,440 kg (3,175 lb) (1,460 kg (3,219 lb))	6-speed manual	7G-Tronic
SLK 350	2004–2007	3,498 cc (213.5 cu in) V6 (M272)	272 PS (200 kW; 268 hp) at 6,000, 350 N⋅m (258 lbf⋅ft) at 2,400-5,000	5.4**	250 km/h (155.3 mph)****	1,465 kg (3,230 lb) (1,485 kg (3,274 lb))	6-speed manual	7G-Tronic
SLK 350	2008–2011	3,498 cc (213.5 cu in) V6 (M272)	306 PS (225 kW; 302 hp) at 6,000, 360 N⋅m (266 lbf⋅ft) at 2,400-5,000	5.3	250 km/h (155.3 mph)****	1,485 kg (3,274 lb) (1,505 kg (3,318 lb))	6-speed manual	7G-Tronic
SLK 55 AMG	2004-2011	5,439 cc (331.9 cu in) V8 (M113)	360 PS (265 kW; 355 hp), 510 N⋅m (376 lbf⋅ft)	4.3***	250 km/h (155.3 mph)****	(1,540 kg (3,395 lb))	7G-Tronic	7G-Tronic with AMG-SPEEDSHIFT
SLK 55 AMG Black Series	2006–2008	5,439 cc (331.9 cu in) V8 (M113)	400 PS (294 kW; 395 hp), 520 N⋅m (384 lb⋅ft)	4.5***	280 km/h (174.0 mph)	(1,495 kg (3,296 lb))	7G-Tronic	7G-Tronic with AMG-SPEEDSHIFT

^{*}All specifications with standard equipment.

^{**}Acceleration time with manual transmission.

^{***}Acceleration time with automatic transmission.

^{****}Terminal speed electronically limited to 250 km/h (155 mph) per "gentlemen's agreement" in 1986. The optional extra-cost AMG Driver's Package for SLK 55 AMG raises the terminal speed to 280 km/h (174 mph).

For the facelifts: SLK 280 fuel economy was improved while CO_{2} emissions were reduced. In addition to power boosts on the SLK 200 KOMPRESSOR and SLK 350, the engine speed limit was raised to 6800 rpm, with temporary boost to 7200 rpm across the family (except SLK 55 AMG). Other changes include a higher compression ratio, a new intake manifold and an extensively modified valvetrain.

=== Factory options ===
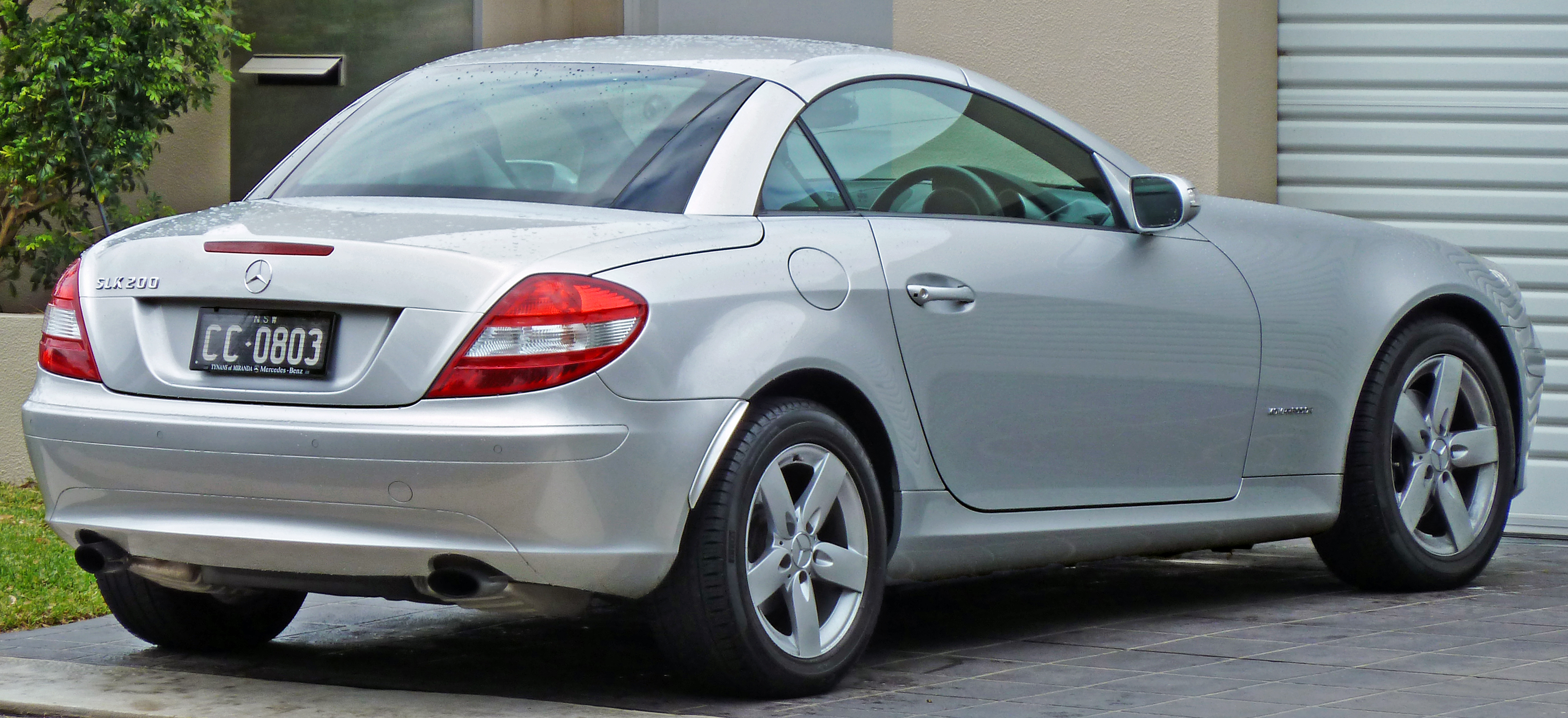
Pre-facelift Mercedes-Benz SLK 200 Kompressor (Australia)

- AMG bodystyling
- High capacity battery
- COMAND APS control and display system for radio/navigation
- Bi-xenon headlights with headlight washers, auto leveling. (SLK 200K, SLK 280, SLK 350, SLK 55 [adds cornering adjustment])
- CD changer in glove box (6 disc)
- Alarm system with tow-away protection
- 'Homelink' garage door opener
- Pre-installation for roof carrier systems
- Basic carrier bars
- Interior lighting package (standard SLK 350, SLK 55 AMG)
- Asphymetric mirror glass (limited markets)
- THERMOTRONIC automatic climate control
- Air Scarf: Heated air directed from the headrest to the back of the neck. (includes fabric windblocker)
- Leather or wood/leather steering wheel/shifter (excluding SLK 55 AMG)
- Parktronic parking aids (front sensors are referred to as Quickpark)
- Rain sensing wipers.
- Tire pressure loss warning system
- Heated windscreen washer
- Heated seats (standard SLK 55 AMG)
- Lowered sports suspension (only available in conjunction with 17" light alloys and tyre pressure loss warning)
- Sport Package (limited markets, not offered for SLK 55 AMG)
- Harman Kardon LOGIC7 surround sound system
- Fabric windblocker no longer included with US cars (except with AIRSCARF option)
- Transparent windblocker
- Sirius Satellite Radio (USA only)
- Designo: Special Paint colours and leathers, choices and prices depend on region, US pricing is $8000.
- Power-folding side mirrors (limited markets)
- Handsfree phone kit
- iPod integration
- Audio input with pre-facelift COMAND, post-facelift cars have the Media Interface option
- 8 way power seats
- Lumbar adjustment (not available on SLK 55)
- Performance Package (AMG 030 Package, only for the SLK 55)
- 'Edit10n' 10 year Anniversary Package (special paint colour, red trim on the interior)

== AMG models ==
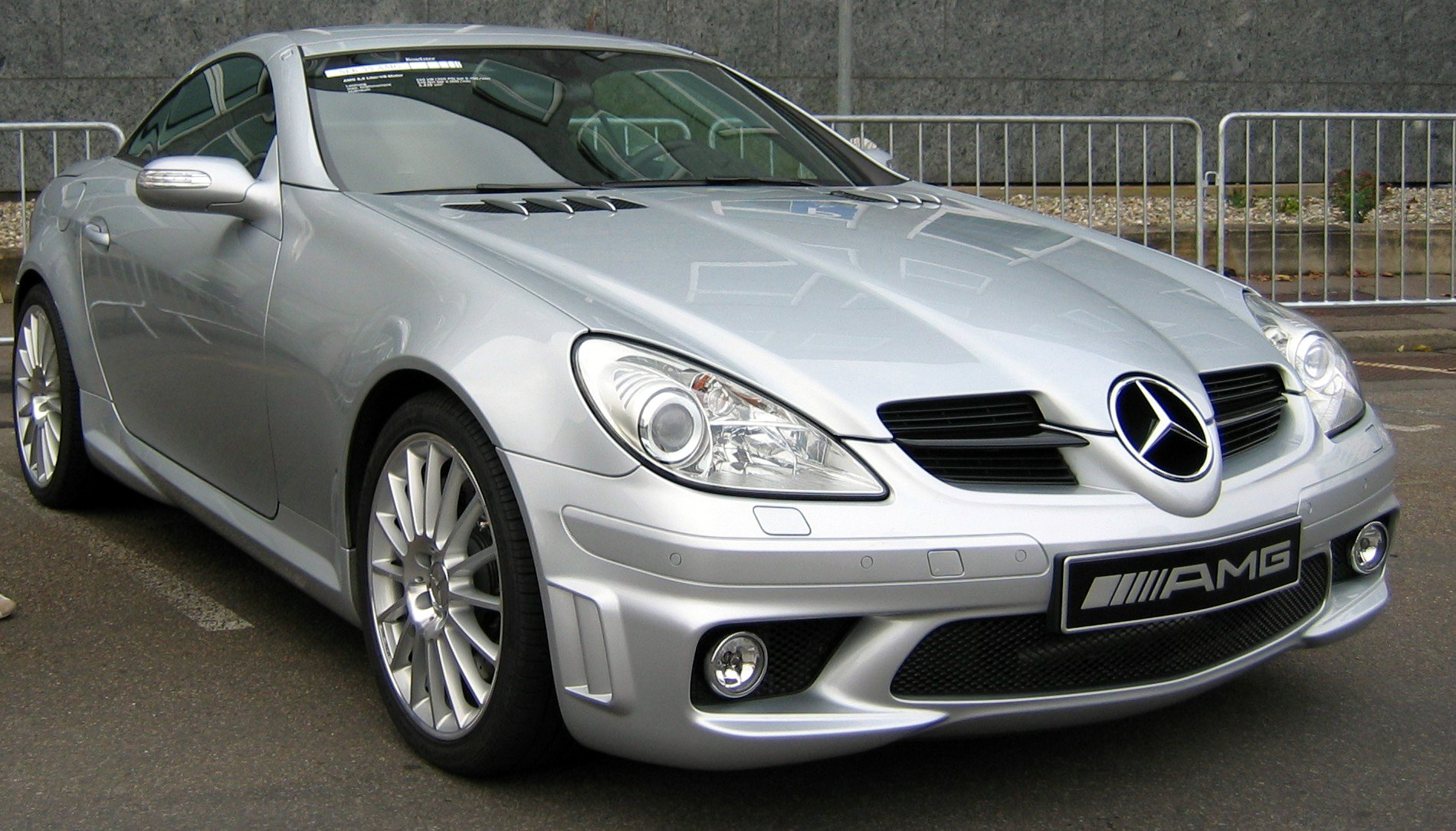
Mercedes SLK 55 AMG

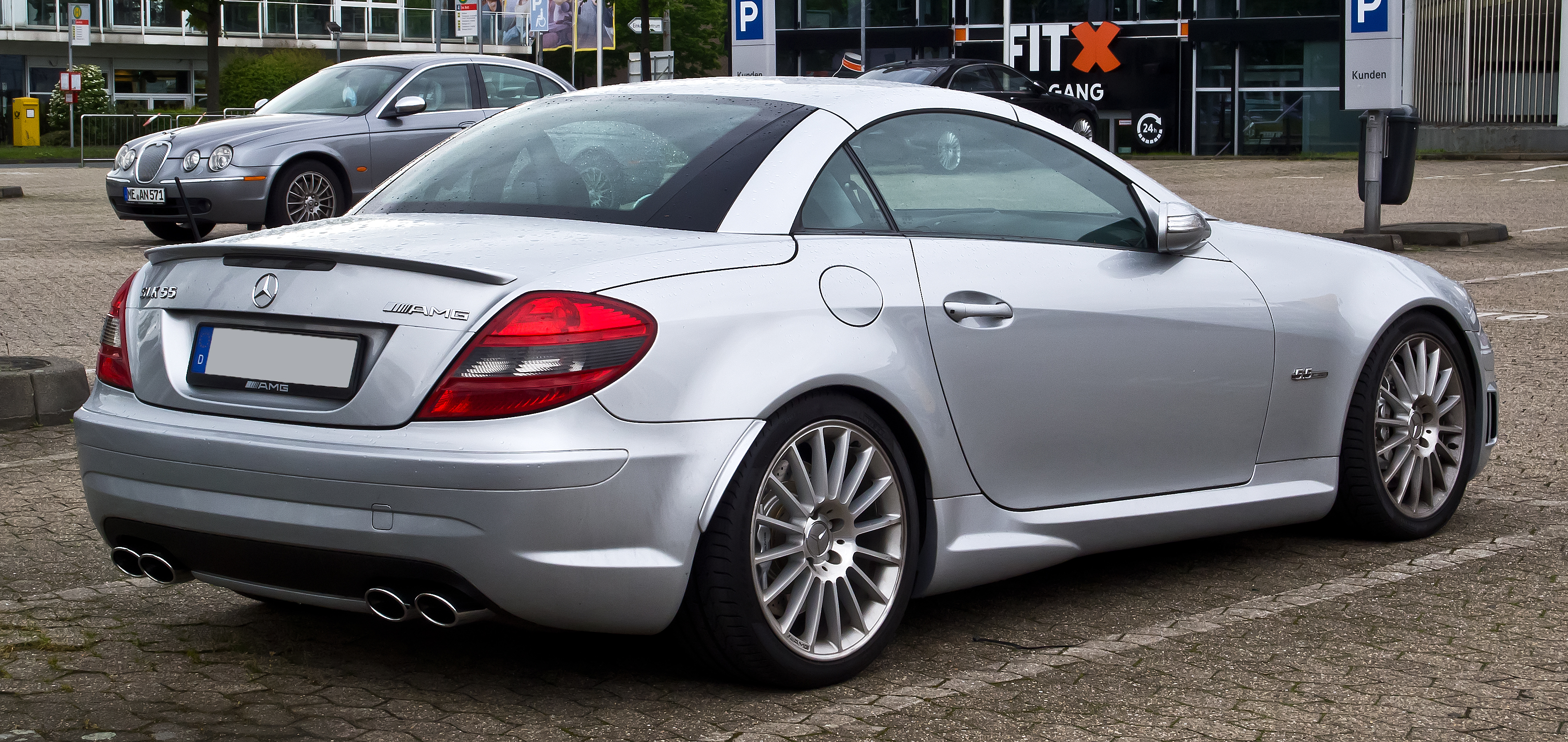
Mercedes SLK 55 AMG

=== SLK 55 AMG ===
The SLK 55 AMG is a performance version of the SLK with AMG's naturally aspirated 5.4L M113 V8 producing 360 PS (265 kW; 355 hp) at 5750 rpm and 510 N⋅m (376 lbf⋅ft) of torque at 4000 rpm, and only offered with a 7-speed automatic transmission. Mercedes quotes a 0-62 mph (100 km/h) time of 4.9 seconds, and Car and Driver reported a 0-60 mph time of 4.3 seconds as well as a quarter mile time of 12.7 seconds. In addition, the SLK 55 also has the following features:

- Increased brake capacity. 345x30mm brake discs (Pre-2008-model-year cars have 6-piston front calipers with perforated and slotted rotors, and 4-piston rear calipers. Later models have a mix of brakes depending on options and market: either the original 6-piston fronts or the 4-piston fronts from the C55. Mercedes made this change not only to cut costs but also to reduce complaints about brake squeal from customers not used to high performance brakes.)
- Additional engine oil cooler (behind right-hand bumper vents)
- Lowered/stiffened suspension (springs, shocks, sway bars)
- 18-inch alloy wheels with 225/40 front and 245/35 rear tyres.
- AMG body kit, with distinctive gills in front bumpers
- Chrome-accented fog lights
- Napa leather interior
- Quad exhaust
- Smoked taillights and CHMSL
- 2008 facelift included a controller upgrade to the AMG SPEEDSHIFT 7G-TRONIC transmission, shifts 10% faster than previous model.

==== SLK 55 Sport/030/P30 ====
An option package on top of the standard SLK 55 AMG developed by the AMG Performance Studio adds the following:

- Nurburgring suspension
- Improved pads and rotors (currently the only sure way to get the pre-2008 6-piston front brakes and 4-piston rears). AMG high-performance braking system with composite brake discs at the front wheels. Internally ventilated and perforated composite brake discs (360x32mm) with 6-piston fixed calipers at the front. Internally ventilated and perforated brake discs (330x26mm) with 4-piston fixed calipers at the rear
- Carbon fibre interior accents
- AMG 18-inch multi-piece light-alloy wheels in a twin-spoke design, 7.5x18 rim with 225/40R18 tyres at the front and 8.5x18 rim with 245/35R18 tyres at the rear
- AMG performance steering wheel with smaller diameter, flattened lower section and silver-coloured aluminium shift paddles (plus aluminium trim element)
- delimited top speed (which is actually now standard on most SLK 55s)

As of 2006 AMG has released several new models, but these are not available in all export markets:

- SLK 55 Asia Cup (Track Sport) Limited to 35 cars LHD and RHD.
- SLK 55 'F1 Safety Car'

=== SLK 55 AMG Black Series (2006-2008) ===
The SLK 55 AMG Black Series is a version of the SLK 55 with power increased to 400 PS (294 kW; 395 hp) at 5750 rpm and 520 N⋅m (384 lb⋅ft) of torque at 4000 rpm. It also features a restyled AMG front apron with large air intakes; additional transmission oil cooler and the high-performance steering gear oil cooler; aluminum front strut brace; new carbon fiber side air outlets; wider carbon fibre reinforced plastic (CFRP) front fenders; CFRP non-retractable hardtop; 19-inch light alloy wheels with 235/35ZR19 front and 265/30ZR19 rear Pirelli P Zero Nero tires (optional sport tires are available without extra charge); coilover suspension by KW; black pearl velour AMG sport bucket seats without side airbags; CF trunk spoiler; and carbon fibre door panel lining and trim parts. The vehicle has a curb weight of 1,495 kg (3,296 lb), 45 kg (99 lb) lighter than the standard SLK 55 AMG. The increases in engine performance come largely from the long tube headers and a revised ECU.

The vehicle went on sale in Germany beginning in July 2006 with an MSRP of €107,300 (incl. 16% VAT).

== Special Editions ==
The "Edition 10" (2007) is a version commemorating the 10th anniversary of SLK-Class vehicles. The concept vehicle originally appeared in the 2006 Paris Motor Show and was based on the SLK 280 with the 7G-TRONIC transmission; matte-grey metallic body; dark-grey painted, high-sheen light-alloy wheels in a ten-spoke design with 225/45R17 front and 245/40R17 rear tires; black leather seats and interior with silver-coloured under layer; AIRSCARF neck-level heating system; THERMOTRONIC automatic climate-control system; PARKTRONIC parking aid; and COMAND system with Europe-wide navigation.

The production versions were available in SLK 200 KOMPRESSOR, SLK 280, and SLK 350 models, which include 'allanite grey Magno' paint, wheels and tires, and the interior from the show car. AIRSCARF, THERMOTRONIC, and COMAND were offered separately.

The 2LOOK Edition (2009) is a limited appearance package available for the SLK 200 KOMPRESSOR, SLK 300 and SLK 350 models unveiled in the 2009 Geneva Motor Show. It includes calcite white, black, obsidian black metallic, or designo mystic white paint (300 units total for obsidian black metallic and designo mystic white); 18-inch 5-twin-spoke titanium silver or chrome shadow alloy wheels with 225/40R18 front and 245/35R18 rear tires; discreet emblems on the wings and a windblocker of transparent acrylic glass; nappa leather seats with the seat centre panels in white and the contoured bolsters in black; contrasting black-and-white doors; and the centre armrest in leather.

== Facelift (2008-2011) ==
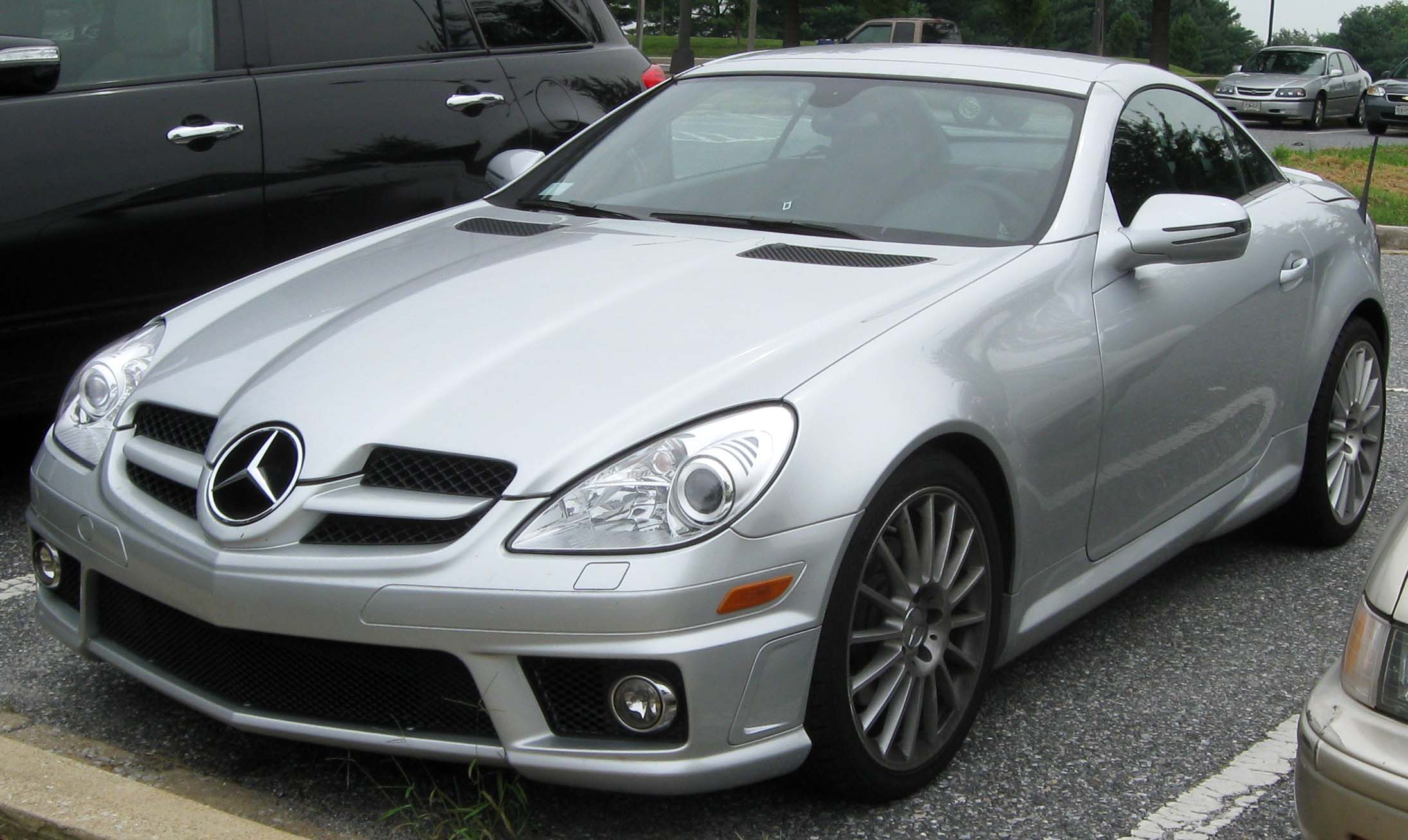
Facelift Mercedes-Benz SLK-Class (US)

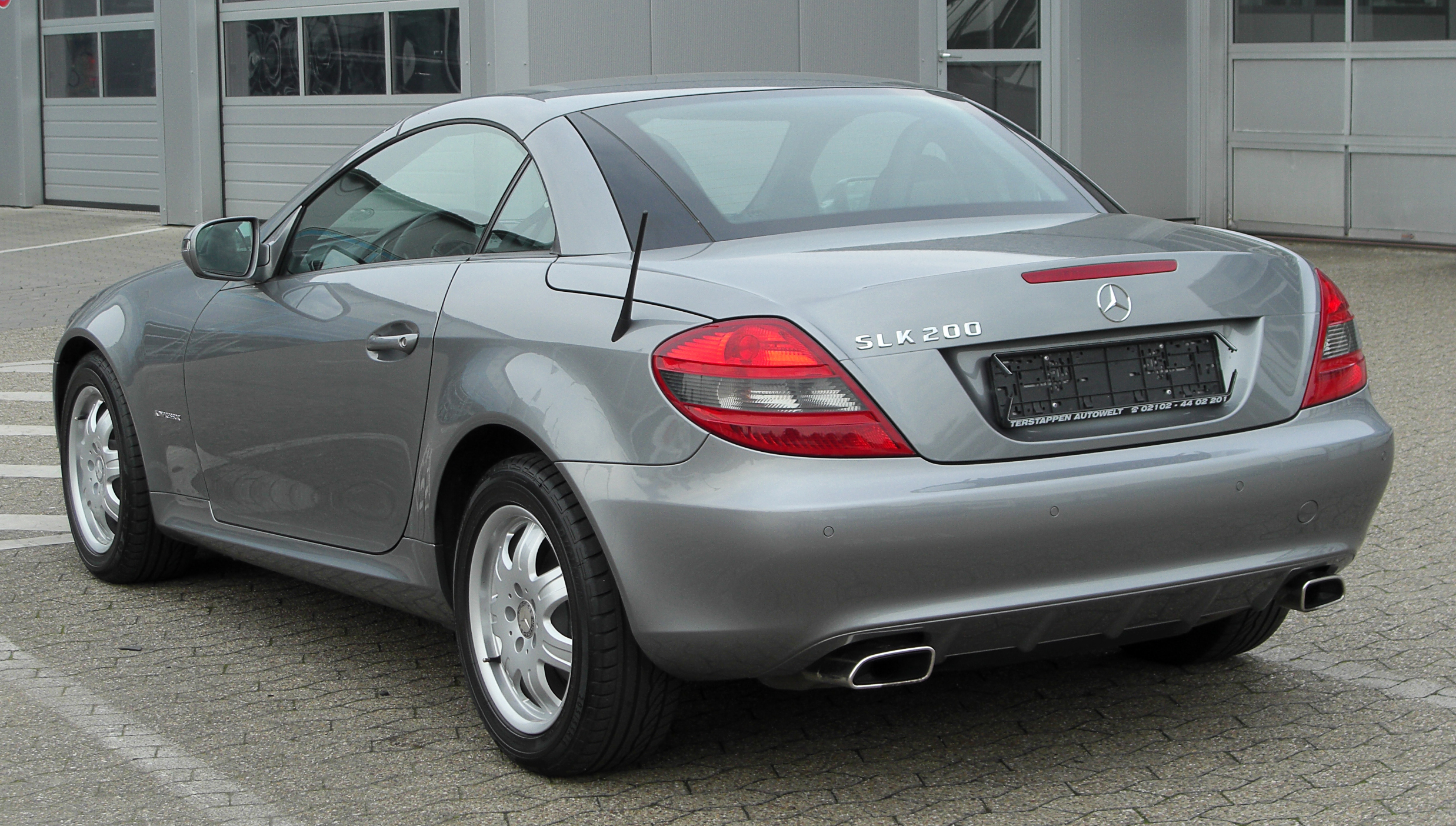
Facelift Mercedes-Benz SLK 200 Kompressor (Germany)

The updated model includes a revised front bumper with a modified air-dam arrangement and a more pronounced arrow shape. The rear end was modified by introducing a diffuser-style lower section that makes the Roadster appear more powerful when viewed from behind. The larger exterior mirrors feature LED indicators with a pronounced arrow shape, while the range of light-alloy wheels is also almost entirely new. The interior was optimised to be more driver-oriented, and the instrument cluster was updated to include NTG 2.5 audio and telematics with optional LINGUATRONIC voice-operated control and an optional Harman/Kardon Logic7 sound system.

A "gullwing red" leather option, inspired by the original 300 SL gullwing, was added. Further new additions include nappa leather appointments in "natural beige", in addition to new "pale burr walnut" and "black ash grain" wood trims.

Direct steering assist system with variable steering assistance became an option (standard in the SLK 55 AMG). The SLK 55 AMG included a new apron with a black-painted cross strut and side air outlets as well as darkened headlamps.

The facelifted R171 was unveiled in the 2008 NAIAS and went on sale in April 2008.

In November 2012, Road & Track ranked the SLK350 9th in their Best All Around Sports Car test. In particular, Road Test Editor Patrick Hong noted that the facelifted model "... with its improved manual transmission, is finally worth considering as a real sports car. The previous model was more of a cruiser, but this new SLK350 is different in that its engine is peppier, coming on when needed." The article further noted that the SLK 350 had the best ride out of all the vehicles tested with a "solid yet velvety ride quality" and that it is a sports car with a "bias towards grand touring over high performance."
