= Mercedes-Benz M113 engine =

Mercedes-Benz M113/M155
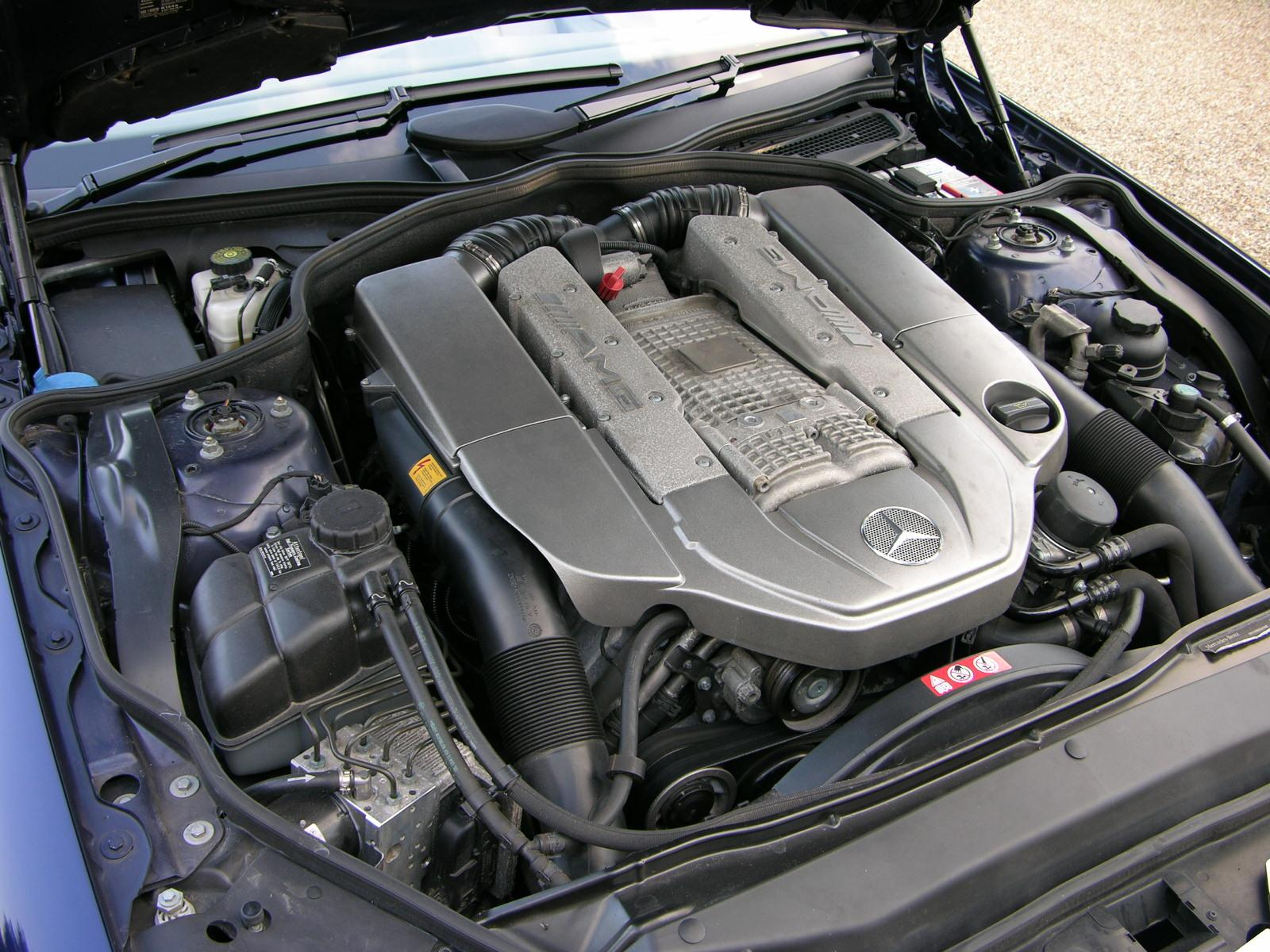
- M113 Kompressor in an SL 55 AMG

Overview
- Manufacturer: Mercedes-Benz; Mercedes-AMG (AMG)
- Production: 1997–2011

Layout
- Configuration: 90° V8
- Displacement: 4.3 L (4,266 cc); 5.0 L (4,966 cc); 5.4 L (5,439 cc)
- Cylinder bore: 89.9 mm (3.54 in); 97 mm (3.82 in)
- Piston stroke: 84 mm (3.31 in); 92 mm (3.62 in)
- Cylinder block material: Aluminium
- Cylinder head material: Aluminium
- Valvetrain: SOHC 3 valves x cyl.

Combustion
- Supercharger: AMG-developed with intercooler
- Fuel system: Sequential fuel injection
- Fuel type: Gasoline
- Cooling system: Water-cooled

Output
- Power output: 279–641 bhp (283–650 PS; 208–478 kW)
- Torque output: 400–820 N⋅m (295–605 lb⋅ft)

Chronology
- Predecessor: Mercedes-Benz M119
- Successor: Mercedes-Benz M273, Mercedes-Benz M156 (most AMG applications), Mercedes-Benz M152 (SLK 55 AMG)

The Mercedes-Benz M113 (and similar M155) engine is a petrol-fueled, spark-ignition internal-combustion V8 automobile engine family used in the 2000s. It is based on the similar M112 V6 introduced in 1997, then later phased out in 2007 for the M156 AMG engine and the M273 engine.

The standard Mercedes-Benz M113s were built in Untertürkheim, Germany, while the AMG versions were assembled at AMG's Affalterbach, Germany plant. M113s have aluminum/silicon (Alusil) engine blocks and aluminum SOHC cylinder heads with two spark plugs per cylinder. The cylinder heads have 3 valves per cylinder (two intake, one exhaust). Other features include sequential fuel injection, iron coated piston skirts, fracture-split forged steel connecting rods, a one-piece cast camshaft, and a magnesium intake manifold.

== E43 ==
The M113 43 is a 4.3 L (4,266 cc) version. Bore and stroke is 89.9 mm × 84 mm (3.54 in × 3.31 in). Power output is 279 PS (205 kW; 275 hp) at 5,750 rpm with 400 N⋅m (295 lb⋅ft) of torque at 3,000 rpm. Output for the variant used in the C 43 AMG is uprated to 306 PS (225 kW; 302 hp) at 5,850 rpm and 410 N⋅m (302 lb⋅ft) at 3,250 rpm.

Applications:

- M113.940: 1997–2002 E 430 (W210)
- M113.941: 1997–2005 S 430 (W220)
- M113.942: 1998–2001 ML 430 (W163)
- M113.943: 1997–2003 CLK 430 (C208)
- M113.944: 1997–2000 C 43 AMG (W202)

== E50 ==
The M113 50 is a 5.0 L (4,966 cc) version with a bore and stroke of 97 mm × 84 mm (3.82 in × 3.31 in). Power output is 306 PS (225 kW; 302 hp) at 5,600 rpm with 460 N⋅m (339 lb⋅ft) of torque at 2,700 to 4,250 rpm. The G 500 and ML 500 both use a detuned version of the 5-liter M113 engine and their output is 296 PS (218 kW; 292 hp) and 292 PS (215 kW; 288 hp) respectively. Active Cylinder Control variable displacement technology is optional.

Applications:

- 1999–2001 SL 500 (R129)
- 1998–2008 G 500 (W463)
- 1999–2006 S 500 (W220)
- 1998–2006 CL 500 (C215)
- 2001–2005 ML 500 (W163)
- 2001–2006 SL 500 (R230)
- 2002–2006 CLK 500 (C209)
- 2002–2006 E 500 (W211)
- 2004–2006 CLS 500 (C219)
- 2005–2007 ML 500 (W164)
- 2006–2007 R 500 (W251)
- 2008–2017 SsangYong Chairman W

== E55 AMG ==
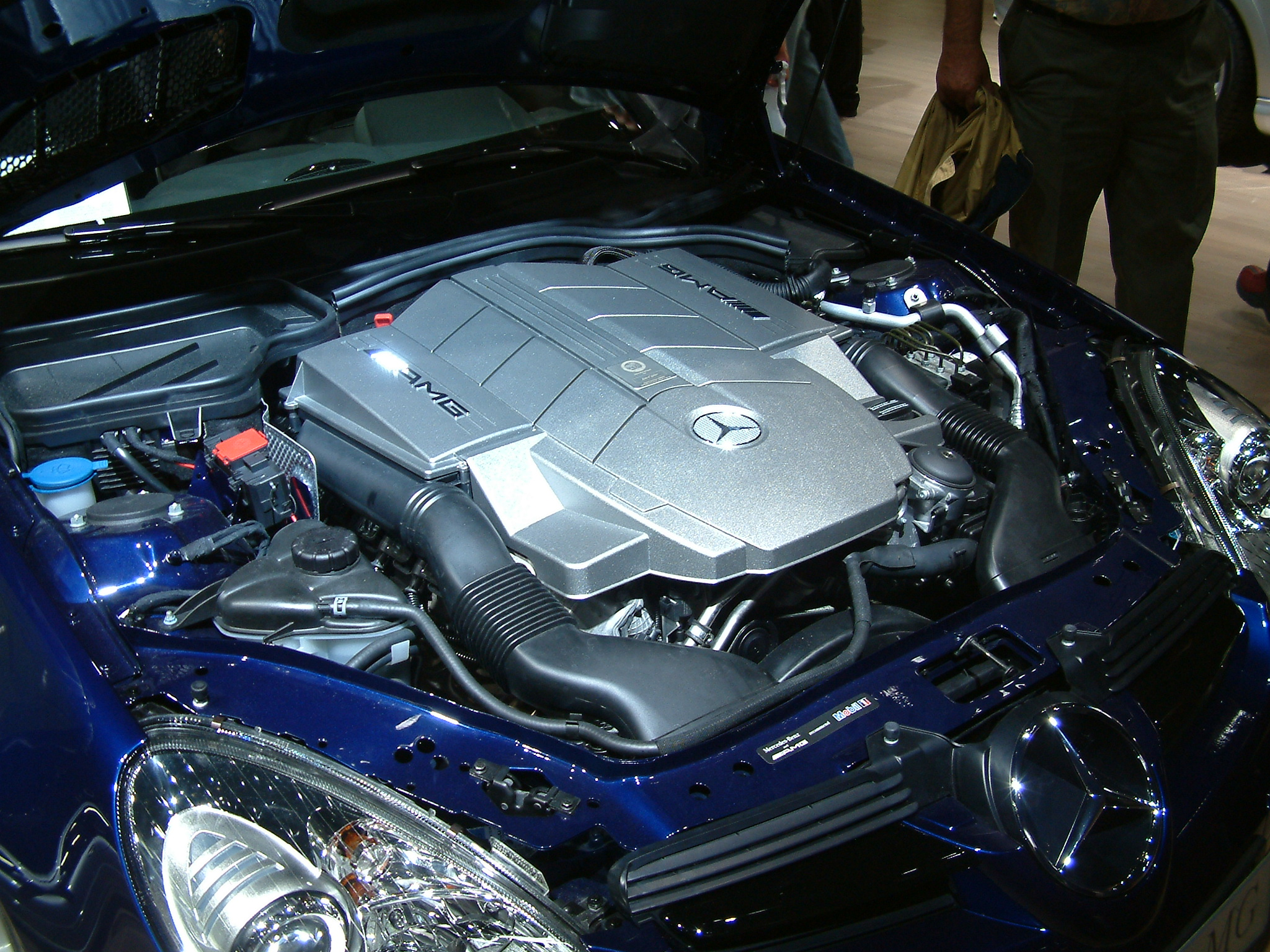
SLK 55 AMG M113 E55 engine

The M113 55 is a 5.4 L (5,439 cc) version with the same 97 mm (3.82 in) bore as the M113 50/500 but with a longer 92 mm (3.62 in) stroke developed by Mercedes-AMG. These cars were the first to carry the 55 AMG title. Power output is 347 to 367 PS (255 to 270 kW; 342 to 362 hp) at 5,500–5,750 rpm with 510 to 530 N⋅m (376 to 391 lb⋅ft) of torque at 2,800–5,400 rpm. Many popular tuners such as Kleemann USA and AMG itself developed supercharger systems for this model, mirroring the later M113 E55 ML design. In the SLK 55 AMG Black Series the engine has a power output of 400 PS (294 kW; 395 hp) at 5,750 rpm and 519 N⋅m (383 lb⋅ft) of torque at 3,750 rpm.

Applications:

- 1997 CLK 55 AMG F1 safety car (C208)
- 1997–2002 E 55 AMG (W210)
- 1998–2000 C 55 AMG (W202)
- 1999–2001 SL 55 AMG (R129)
- 1999–2003 G 55 AMG (W463)
- 1999–2002 S 55 AMG (W220&V220)
- 1999–2002 CLK 55 AMG (C208)
- 1999–2002 CL 55 AMG (C215)
- 2000–2003 ML 55 AMG (W163)
- 2002–2006 CLK 55 AMG (C209)
- 2004–2010 SLK 55 AMG (R171)
- 2003–2007 C 55 AMG (W203)
- 2006–2008 SLK 55 AMG Black Series (R171)

== E55K AMG ==
The M113 Kompressor is a supercharged and twin-intercooled version of the 5.4 L (5,439 cc) M113. It is commonly referred to as "M113K" – where 'K' stands for Kompressor (supercharger). Power output varies depending on year and model, from 469 bhp (476 PS; 350 kW) at 6,100 rpm for the E 55 AMG to 574 bhp (582 PS; 428 kW) in the 2004–2006 CLK DTM AMG, with 700 to 800 N⋅m (516 to 590 lb⋅ft) of torque at 2,750–4,000 rpm.

The M113K engine has also received praise for its reliability. Mercedes-AMG replaced this model with the first AMG engine built in-house, the M156 6.2 L naturally aspirated V8.

Applications:

- 2002–2006 S 55 AMG (W220)
- 2002–2008 SL 55 AMG (R230)
- 2003–2006 CL 55 AMG (C215)
- 2003–2006 E 55 AMG (W211)
- 2004–2006 CLK DTM AMG (C209)
- 2004–2006 CLS 55 AMG (C219)
- 2004–2011 G 55 AMG (W463)
- 2005 Fisker Tramonto V8
- 2005 Laraki Fulgura V8

== M155 ==
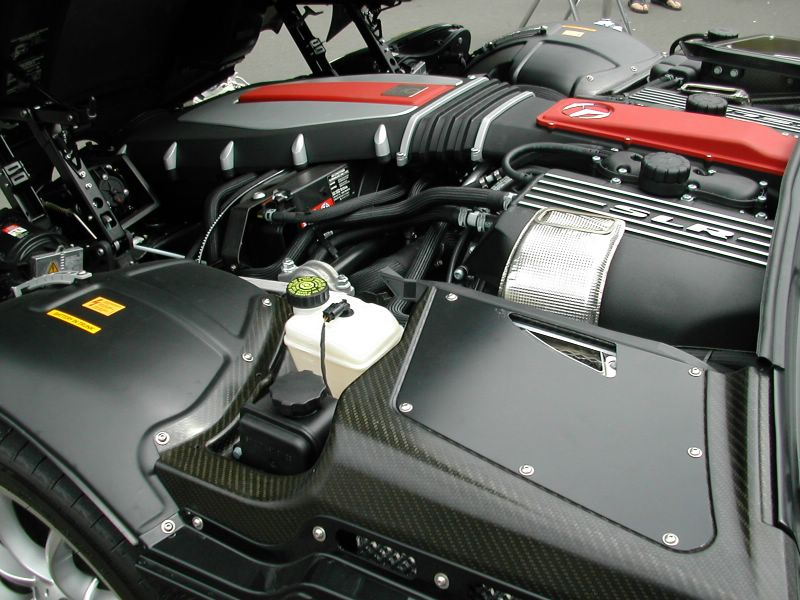
M155 engine in Mercedes-Benz SLR McLaren

The M155 is a version of the supercharged 5.4 L (5,439 cc) M113 specifically for the Mercedes-Benz SLR McLaren. Power output is 617 bhp (626 PS; 460 kW) at 6,500 rpm with 780 N⋅m (575 lb⋅ft) of torque at 3,250 rpm. An uprated version with 641 bhp (650 PS; 478 kW) at 6,500 rpm and 820 N⋅m (605 lb⋅ft) of torque at 4,000 rpm and 7250 rpm Rev Limit, featured in the 722 edition. The M155 was Mercedes-AMG's last supercharged V8 before they switched to naturally aspirated and turbocharged engines.

Applications:

- 2004 SLR McLaren
- 2006 SLR McLaren 722 Edition
- 2007 SLR McLaren Roadster
- 2009 SLR McLaren Stirling Moss

== See also ==
- List of Mercedes-Benz engines
