= Mercedes-Benz M273 engine =

Mercedes-Benz M273
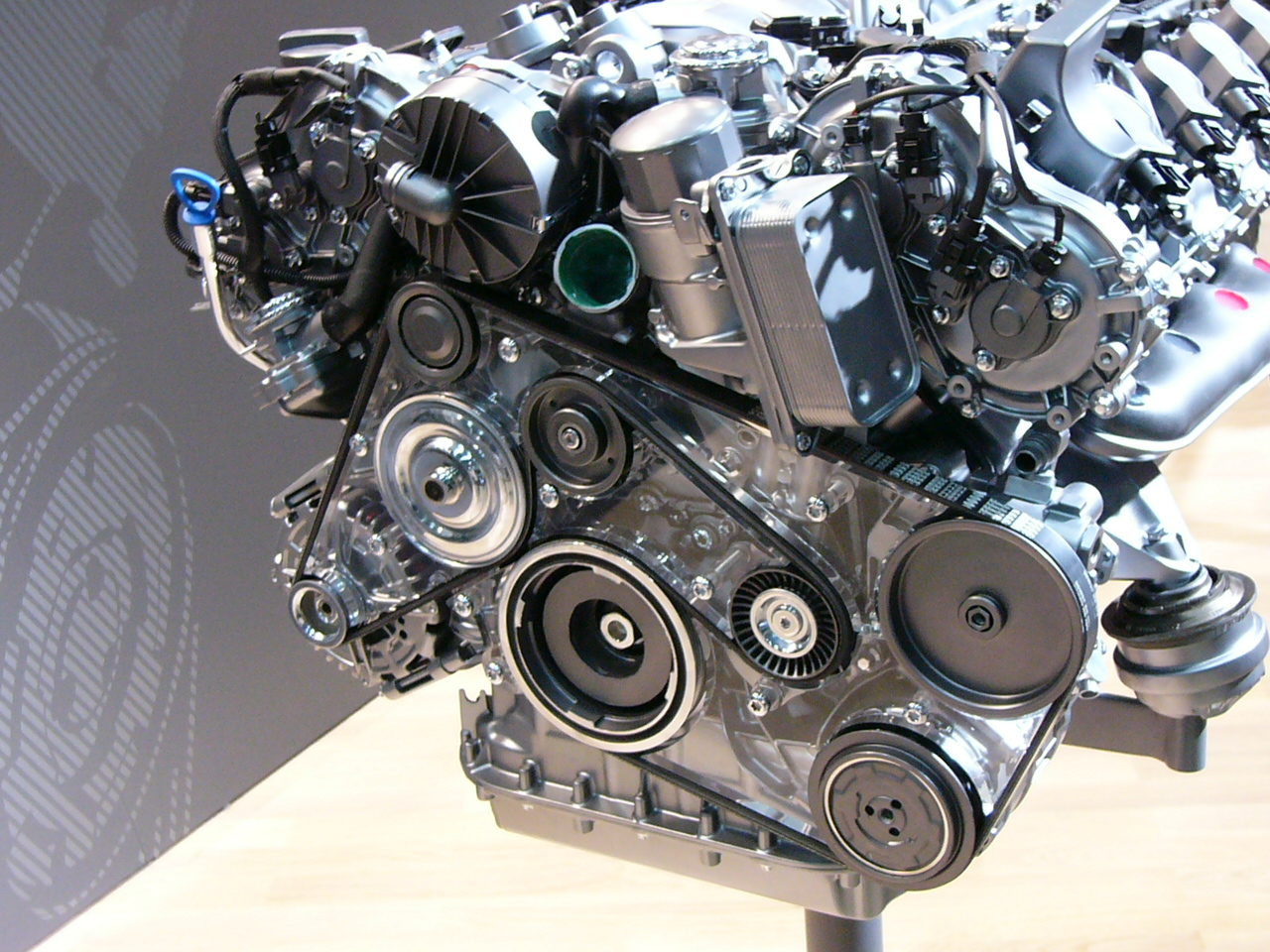

Overview
- Manufacturer: Mercedes-Benz
- Production: 2005–2013

Layout
- Configuration: Naturally aspirated 90° V8
- Displacement: 4.7 L (4,663 cc); 5.5 L (5,461 cc)
- Cylinder bore: 92.9 mm (3.66 in); 98 mm (3.86 in)
- Piston stroke: 86 mm (3.39 in); 90.5 mm (3.56 in)
- Cylinder block material: Aluminium
- Cylinder head material: Aluminium
- Valvetrain: DOHC 4 valves x cyl. and continuous VVT

Combustion
- Fuel system: Sequential port injection
- Fuel type: Gasoline
- Cooling system: Water cooled

Output
- Power output: 250–285 kW (340–387 PS; 335–382 hp)
- Torque output: 460–530 N⋅m (339–391 lb⋅ft)

Chronology
- Predecessor: Mercedes-Benz M113
- Successor: Mercedes-Benz M278

The Mercedes-Benz M273 engine is a V8 automobile piston engine family used in the 2000s (decade). It was based on the similar M272 V6 introduced in 2004.

An evolution of the M113 V8, all M273s have aluminium engine blocks, sequential port fuel injection, fracture-split forged steel connecting rods, a one-piece cast crankshaft, and a magnesium intake manifold. The cylinders are lined with silicon/aluminium, and a dual-length variable-length intake manifold is fitted.

In addition to this, new features shared with the M272 include DOHC aluminium cylinder heads, 4 valves per cylinder and independent continuously variable valve timing on both the intake and exhaust sides. A new electronically controlled cooling system has eliminated the need for a mechanical thermostat for improved engine warm-up and optimum control of engine temperature.

== E47 ==
The E47 is a 4.7 L (4,663 cc) version. Bore and stroke is 92.9 mm × 86 mm (3.66 in × 3.39 in). Output is 250 kW (340 PS; 335 hp) at 6000 rpm with 460 N⋅m (339 lb⋅ft) of torque at 2700–5000 rpm.

Applications:

- 2007–2012 GL 450 (X164)
- 2007–2013 S 450 (W221)

== E55 ==
The E55 is a 5.5 L (5,461 cc) version. Bore and stroke increased to 98 mm × 90.5 mm (3.86 in × 3.56 in). Output is 285 kW (387 PS; 382 hp) at 6000 rpm with 530 N⋅m (391 lb⋅ft) of torque at 2800–4800 rpm.

Applications:

- 2006–2009 E 500 / E 550 (W211)
- 2009–2011 E 500 / E 550 (W212)
- 2006–2010 CL 500 / CL 550 (C216)
- 2006–2010 CLS 500 / CLS 550 (C219)
- 2006–2012 GL 500 / GL 550 (X164)
- 2008–2011 ML 500 / ML 550 (W164)
- 2005–2011 S 500 / S 550 (W221)
- 2006–2012 SL 500 / SL 550 (R230)
- 2006–2009 CLK 500 / CLK 550 (C209)
- 2006–2015 G 500 / G 550 (W463)
- 2007–2014 R 500 / R 550 (W251)
- 2010–present KSU Gazal-1

*Note: 500 or 550 model naming varies depending on geographical market.

== See also ==
- Mercedes-Benz M152 engine and Mercedes-Benz M156 engine for AMG offerings for the similar generation
- List of Mercedes-Benz engines
