= Mercedes-Benz M272 engine =

Mercedes-Benz M272
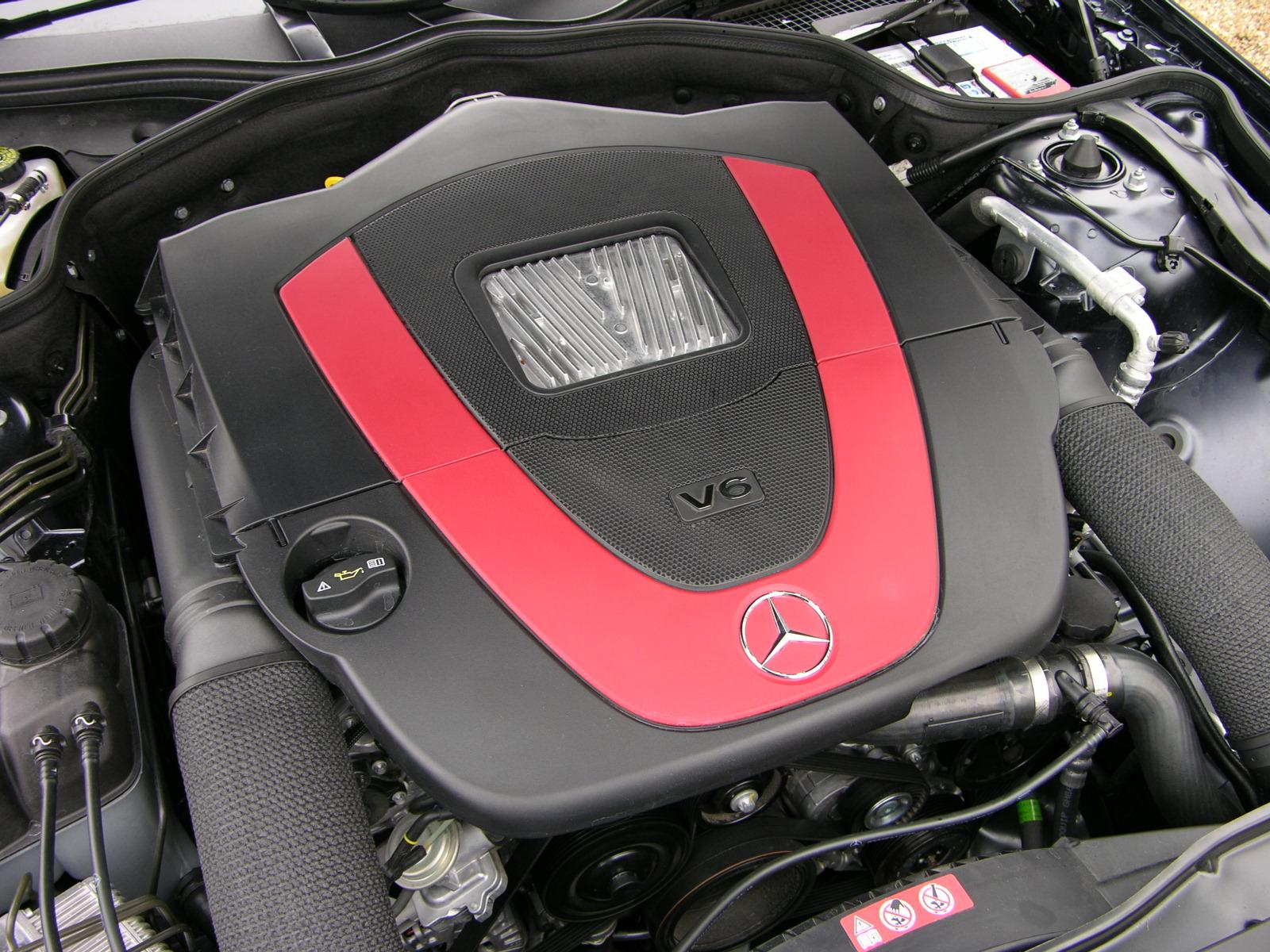
- M272 engine in a 2009 Mercedes-Benz SL 350

Overview
- Manufacturer: Mercedes-Benz
- Production: 2004–2017

Layout
- Configuration: Naturally aspirated 90° V6
- Displacement: 2.5 L (2,496 cc); 3.0 L (2,996 cc); 3.5 L (3,498 cc)
- Cylinder bore: 88 mm (3.46 in); 92.9 mm (3.66 in)
- Piston stroke: 68.4 mm (2.69 in); 82 mm (3.23 in); 86 mm (3.39 in)
- Cylinder block material: Aluminum
- Cylinder head material: Aluminum
- Valvetrain: DOHC 4 valves x cyl. with continuous VVT

Combustion
- Fuel system: port injection or direct injection (CGI)
- Fuel type: Gasoline or E85 (M272 929)
- Cooling system: Water cooled

Output
- Power output: 204–316 PS (150–232 kW; 201–312 bhp)
- Torque output: 245–365 N⋅m (181–269 lb⋅ft)

Chronology
- Predecessor: Mercedes-Benz M112
- Successor: Mercedes-Benz M276

The Mercedes-Benz M272 engine is an automobile piston V6 engine family used in the 2000s (decade). Introduced in 2004, it is based on the M112 V6 introduced in 1998.

All M272 engines have aluminum engine blocks with a 90° V-angle with silicon/aluminum lined cylinders. The aluminum DOHC cylinder heads have 4 valves per cylinder. All have forged steel connecting rods, one-piece cast crankshaft, iron-coated aluminum pistons and a magnesium intake manifold. Like the M112, a balance shaft is installed in the engine block between the cylinder banks to deal with vibrations in the 90 degree V6 design. This essentially eliminates first and second order moments. A dual-length variable length intake manifold is fitted to optimize engine flexibility.

Continuous VVT was adopted for the first time. Featured on both the intake and exhaust camshafts, each can be varied through a range of 40 degrees. The twin spark plug system was replaced by a regular single spark plug per cylinder. New electronic coolant flow control has replaced the mechanical thermostat for improved engine warm-up and optimum control of engine temperature. Also tumble flaps are used to improve output at low engine speeds.

== E25 ==
The E25 is a 2.5 L (2,496 cc) version. Bore and stroke dimension is 88 mm × 68.4 mm (3.46 in × 2.69 in). Output is 204 PS (150 kW; 201 bhp) at 6100 rpm with 245 N⋅m (181 lb⋅ft) of torque at 2900-5500 rpm.

Applications:

- 2005–2007 W203 C 230 (M272 929 for flex fuel vehicles with the ethanol option)
- 2007–2009 W204 C 230
- 2005–2009 W211 E 230
- 2004–2011 CL203 C 230 SportCoupé & CLC 230
- 2010–2012 W639 Viano (Chinese market; known as the M272 924)
- 2010–2011 W639 Vito (Chinese market; known as the M272 924)

== E30 ==
The E30 is a 3.0 L (2,996 cc) version. Bore and stroke is 88 mm × 82 mm (3.46 in × 3.23 in). Output is 231 PS (170 kW; 228 bhp) at 6000 rpm with 300 N⋅m (221 lb⋅ft) of torque at 2500-5000 rpm.

Applications:

- 2004–2010 SLK 280 (R171)
- 2005–2010 CLS 280 / CLS 300 (C219)
- 2005–2010 CLK 280 (C209)
- 2005–2007 C 280 / C 280 4MATIC (W203)
- 2007–2009 C 280 / C 280 4MATIC (W204)
- 2009–2011 C 300 / C 300 4MATIC (W204)
- 2008-2012 GLK 300 4MATIC (X204)
- 2005–2009 E 280 / E 280 4MATIC (W211)
- 2009–2011 E 300 (W212)
- 2005–2009 SL 280 (R230)
- 2005–2013 Vito (W639)
- 2006–2009 R 280 (W251)
- 2007–2013 S 300 (W221)
- 2013–2015 Viano (W639) (Chinese market)
- 2013–2015 Vito (W639) (Chinese market)

== E35 ==
The E35 is a 3.5 L (3,498 cc) version. Bore and stroke dimension is 92.9 mm × 86 mm (3.66 in × 3.39 in). Output is 272 PS (200 kW; 268 bhp) at 6000 rpm with 350 N⋅m (258 lb⋅ft) of torque at 3500 rpm. A direct injected variant debuted in 2006 under the name Stratified-Charged Gasoline Injection (CGI). First fitted to the CLS350 CGI, it produces 292 PS (215 kW; 288 bhp) and 365 N⋅m (269 lb⋅ft) of torque while lowering fuel consumption. In 2008, the non-CGI engine was uprated to 316 PS (232 kW; 312 bhp) at 6500 rpm and 360 N⋅m (266 lb⋅ft) of torque at 4900 rpm with 350 Nm being delivered at 2000 rpm. This was achieved by raising the rev-limit to 7200 rpm, increasing the compression ratio using enhanced, weight-optimized pistons with a curved surface, reinforcements in the area of the piston pins, deeper pockets for the valve seats, single-stage intake manifold, lightweight valves with sodium cooling, conical valve springs, tri-oval chain sprocket, and a new cylinder head.

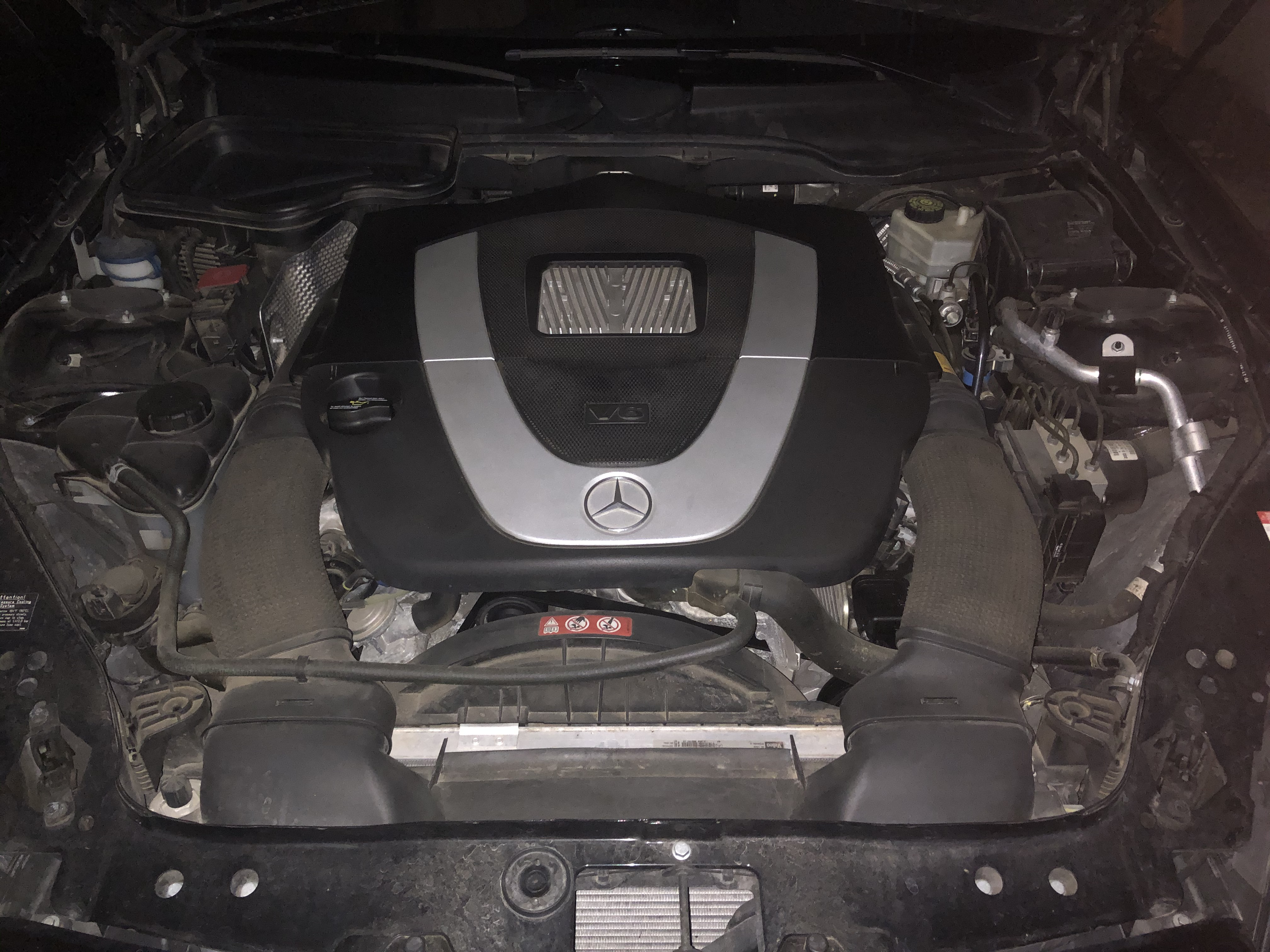
3.5 L M272 engine in a 2005 SLK 350

Applications:

- 2004–2011 R171 SLK 350
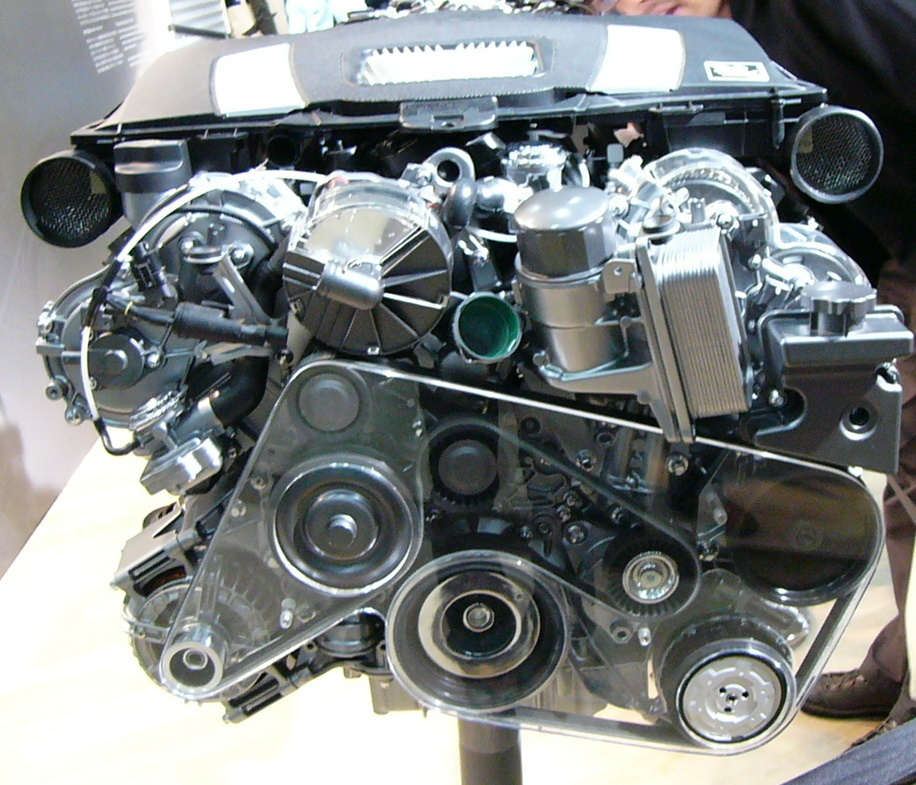
  Front view of a 3.5 L M272 engine
- 2004–2010 W219 CLS 350
- 2005–2010 C209 CLK 350
- 2009–2011 C207 E350
- 2005–2007 W203 C 350 / C 350 4MATIC
- 2007–2011 W204 C 350 / C 350 4MATIC
- 2005–2009 W211 E 350 / E 350 4MATIC
- 2009–2011 W212 E 350 / E 350 4MATIC
- 2005–2011 W221 S 350 / S 350 4MATIC
- 2005–2012 R230 SL 350
- 2006–2017 W251 R 350
- 2006–2011 W164 ML 350
- 2005–2014 W639 Viano (known as the M272 978 in China)
- 2006–2013 NCV3 Sprinter
- 2005–2011 CL203 C 350 SportCoupé & CLC 350
- 2008–2012 X204 GLK 350 4MATIC

== Balance shaft gear and other issues ==
M272 engines that were sold between 2004 and 2007 with engine serial numbers up to 2729..30 468993 often show early wear of the balance shaft gears, requiring extensive repairs at a retail cost of over $4,000. These complaints led to a class action lawsuit against Mercedes-Benz (Greg Suddreth and Paul Dunton v. Mercedes-Benz USA, LLC), which alleged the M272 engines are equipped with defective balance shafts gears which "wear out prematurely, excessively and without warning, purportedly causing the vehicles to malfunction, the check engine light to illuminate and the vehicle to misfire and/or stop driving." The suit further alleged that Mercedes knew of this problem, sending out repair bulletins on how to address this issue and ultimately changing the balance shaft gears to avoid this problem. This suit was ultimately dismissed with the judge agreeing with Mercedes that because the gears fail at 60 -80K miles and outside of the warranty period, Mercedes is not legally responsible for these problems.

However, a second class action lawsuit was filed in October 2012 in Northern California, covering Mercedes-Benz models manufactured between 2005 and 2007. A preliminary settlement was reached on April 8, 2015, which would see owners compensated for up to 70% of the cost of the repair.

These engines also have a common issue with their intake manifolds. The M273 also has similar issues but not to the same extent. The plastic lever that operates the opening and closing of the variable length intake manifold can break prematurely. Mercedes doesn't have this particular part listed, instead they sell the whole intake manifold as one unit which can cost upwards of $800 US. There are a number of third-party companies that sell a replacement lever made out of metal at a much cheaper cost.

== See also ==
- List of Mercedes-Benz engines
