= Mercedes-Benz GL-Class (X164) =

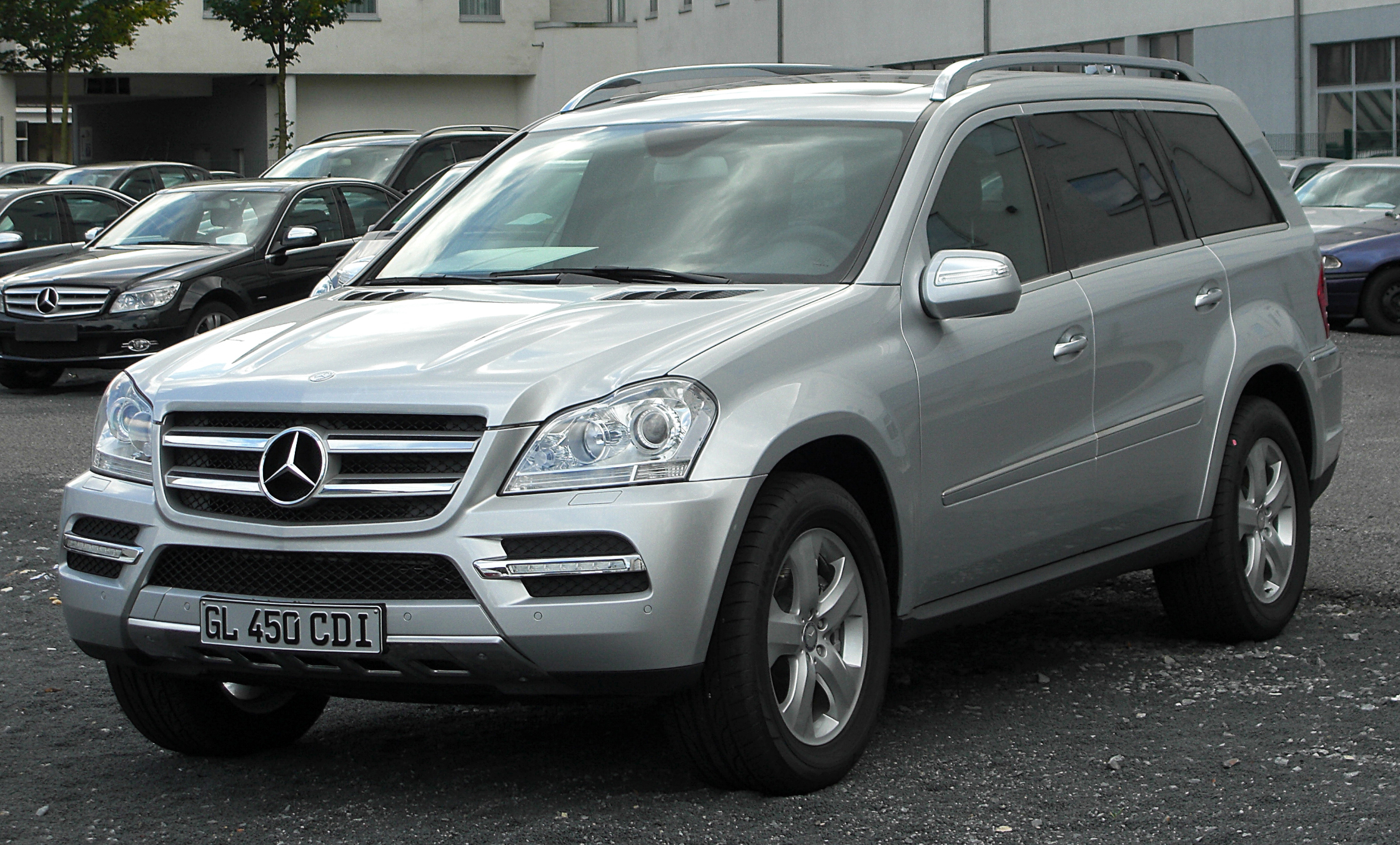

Overview
- Manufacturer: DaimlerChrysler (2006–2007); Daimler AG (2007–2012)
- Production: January 2006 – July 2012
- Model years: 2006–2012 (Europe); 2007–2012 (North America)
- Assembly: United States: Tuscaloosa, Alabama (MBUSI)
- Designer: Steve Mattin

Body and chassis
- Class: Full-size luxury crossover SUV
- Body style: 5-door SUV
- Layout: Front-engine, four-wheel-drive (4matic)
- Platform: W164/V251/W166
- Related: Mercedes-Benz M-Class (W164) Mercedes-Benz R-Class

Powertrain
- Engine: Petrol: 4.7-5.5 L M273 V8; Diesel: 3.0 L OM642 turbo V6; 4.0 L OM629 twin-turbo V8
- Transmission: 7-speed 7G-Tronic automatic

Dimensions
- Wheelbase: 3,075 mm (121.1 in)
- Length: 5,088 mm (200.3 in); 5,099 mm (200.7 in) (facelift)
- Width: 1,920 mm (75.6 in)
- Height: 1,840 mm (72.4 in)
- Kerb weight: 2,355–2,475 kg (5,192–5,456 lb)

Chronology
- Successor: Mercedes-Benz GL-Class (X166)

The X164 GL-Class is a full-sized luxury crossover SUV produced by Mercedes-Benz from 2006 to 2012. It is the first generation model in the GL-Class range.

== Development and launch ==
The X164 GL-Class debuted at the 2006 North American International Auto Show, and deliveries commenced on September in Europe. Around US$600,000,000 was invested in the Mercedes Alabama plant in preparation for the production of vehicles including the X164 GL-Class.

Unlike most three-row luxury SUVs at the time, the GL-Class is based on an elongated and widened version of the M-Class platform, instead of the body-on-frame construction found on vehicles such as the Lexus LX and Cadillac Escalade. The Guardian said in their review of the GL that "even in places where SUVs are rife, it appears comically out of scale" and described the suspension as "caramel-smooth at pace, but bouncy as a Kiddie Castle on speed bumps" before going on to say "the chrome Mercedes badge on the GL's grille is frying pan-sized and, cutely, right at the height where the head would generally be on a standing four-year-old". GL 500 models are badged as GL 550 in the United States.

== Equipment ==
All models feature leather electric seats, an automatic climate control system, 19-inch alloy wheels, 4MATIC all-wheel drive, air suspension (adjustable by up to 307 mm), and a 7-speed 7G-Tronic automatic transmission. GL-Class models are also optionally available with a tyre pressure monitoring system, DAB digital radio, reversing camera, and rear seat infotainment screens. Grand Edition models were also offered from 2011, and feature a redesigned front bumper, taller grille with three slats, 20-inch AMG alloy wheels, bi-xenon headlamps, and a two-tone interior.

== Models ==
=== Petrol engines ===
Model	Years	Engine	Power	Torque	0–100 km/h (0-62 mph)
GL 450	2006–2012	M273 E47; 4.7 L V8	250 kW (340 PS; 335 hp) @ 6,000 rpm	460 N⋅m (339 lb⋅ft) @ 2,700–5,000 rpm	7.2 s
GL 500 / GL 550	2006–2012	M273 E55; 5.5 L V8	285 kW (387 PS; 382 hp) @ 6,000 rpm	530 N⋅m (391 lb⋅ft) @ 2,800–4,800 rpm	6.6 s

=== Diesel engines ===
Model	Years	Engine	Power	Torque	0–100 km/h (0-62 mph)
GL 320 CDI	2006–2009	OM642 DE30; 3.0 L V6 turbo	165 kW (224 PS; 221 hp) @ 3,800 rpm	510 N⋅m (376 lb⋅ft) @ 1,600–2,800 rpm	9.5 s
GL 350 CDI	2009	OM642 DE30; 3.0 L V6 turbo	135 kW (184 PS; 181 hp) @ 5,000–6,250 rpm	320 N⋅m (236 lb⋅ft) @ 1,750–2,000 rpm	9.5 s
GL 350 CDI	2010–2012	OM642 LS DE30; 3.0 L V6 turbo	195 kW (265 PS; 261 hp) @ 3,800 rpm	620 N⋅m (457 lb⋅ft) @ 1,600–2,400 rpm	7.9 s
GL 350 BlueTEC	2009–2012	OM642 DE30; 3.0 L V6 turbo	155 kW (211 PS; 208 hp) @ 3,400 rpm	540 N⋅m (398 lb⋅ft) @ 1,600–2,400 rpm	10.7 s
GL 420 CDI	2006–2009	OM629 DE40; 4.0 L V8 twin-turbo	225 kW (306 PS; 302 hp) @ 3,600 rpm	700 N⋅m (516 lb⋅ft) @ 2,000–2,600 rpm	7.6 s
GL 450 CDI	2009–2010	OM629 DE40; 4.0 L V8 twin-turbo	225 kW (306 PS; 302 hp) @ 3,600 rpm	700 N⋅m (516 lb⋅ft) @ 2,000–2,600 rpm	7.6 s

== Model year changes ==
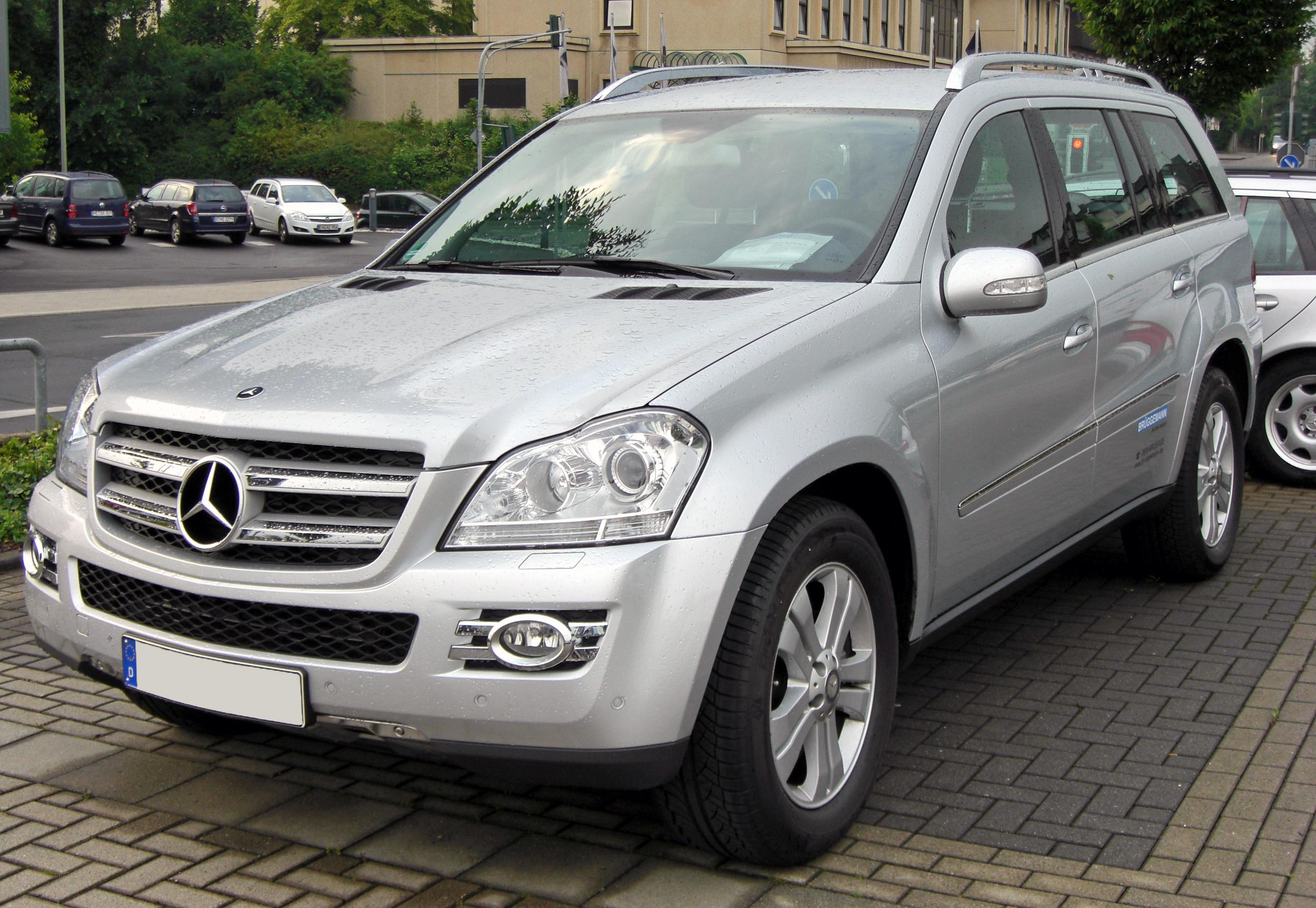
Pre-Facelift GL 320 CDI

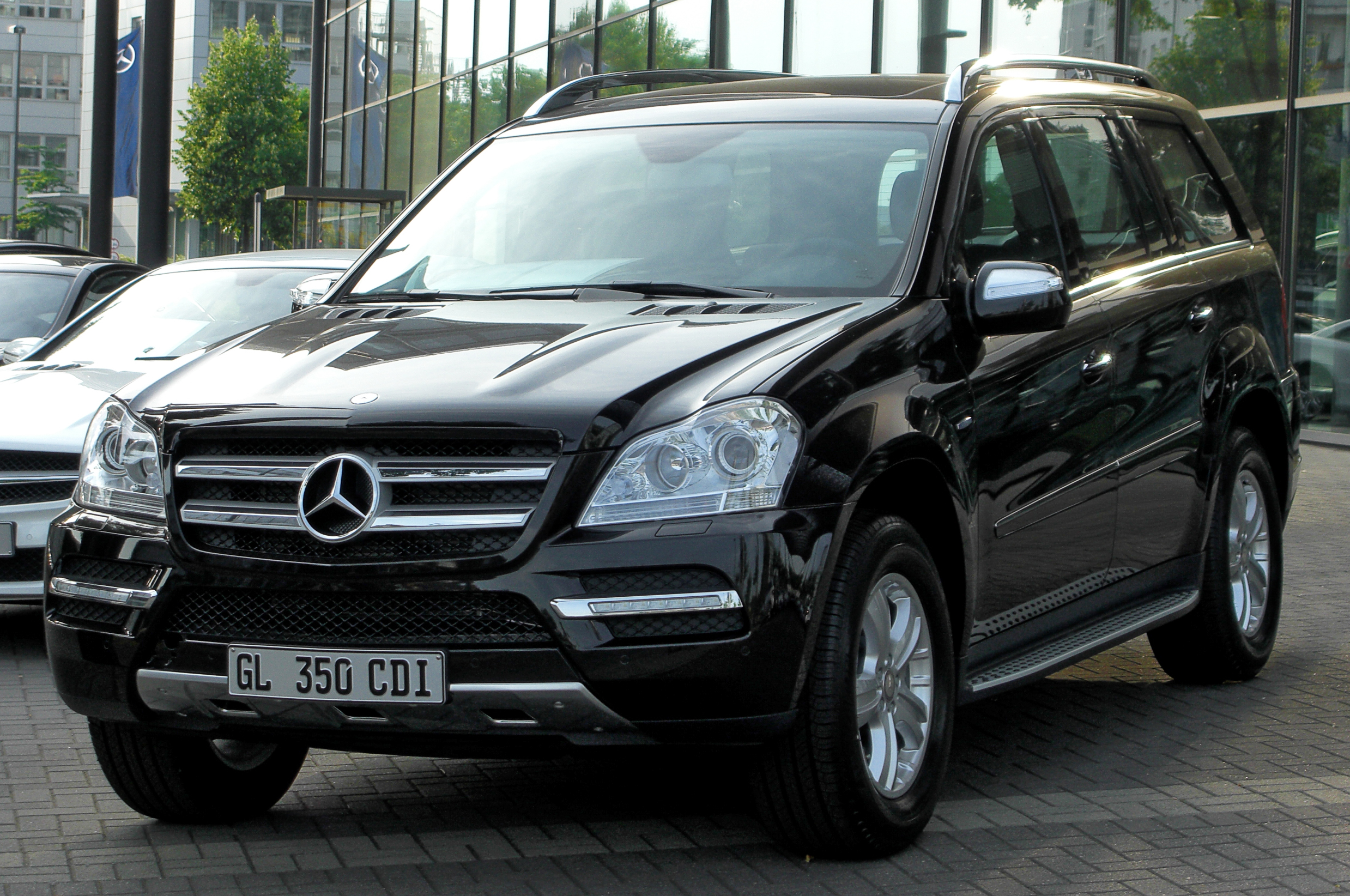
Facelift GL 350 CDI

=== 2009 facelift ===
The following changes apply for models produced since June 2009:

- Exterior design changes including: redesigned radiator grille, foglights, bumpers, wing-mirrors, Standard LED tail-lights, Optional LED DRL/Fogs with Xenon Package
- Interior design changes including: redesigned seats and steering wheel
- Addition of Tenorite Grey and Palladium Silver exterior colour options
- All diesel models now receive urea-injection in exhaust system (BlueTEC), to meet 50-state emissions requirement
- Introduction of GL 350 CDI BlueTec, GL 320 CDI model rebadged as GL 350 CDI, and GL 420 CDI rebadged as GL 450 CDI

=== 2010 ===
- GL 350 CDI engine updated and GL 450 CDI ends production

=== 2011 ===
- Wing mirrors changed again
- Introduction of Grand Edition model for GL 450 and GL 350 CDI BlueTec

== Sales figures ==
The following are the sales figures for the X164 GL-Class: Note: 2012 sales figures include the next generation model.

Year	EU sales	US sales
2006	3,007	18,776
2007	8,027	26,396
2008	4,227	23,328
2009	2,871	15,012
2010	2,249	19,943
2011	2,508	25,139
2012	1,573	26,042
Total:	24,462	154,636

== Awards ==
- 2007 MotorTrend “SUV of the Year”
- 2008 Car and Driver "10 Best Trucks and SUVs" award
- 2011 AutoPacific "Motorist Choice Award" in the SUV category
