= M271 =

M271 may refer to:

- M271 motorway, a short motorway in Hampshire, England
- Mercedes-Benz M271 engine, an automobile engine
- M271 trailer, a US Army cargo trailer
