= Mercedes-Benz CLK-Class (C209) =

Mercedes-Benz CLK-Class (C209/A209)
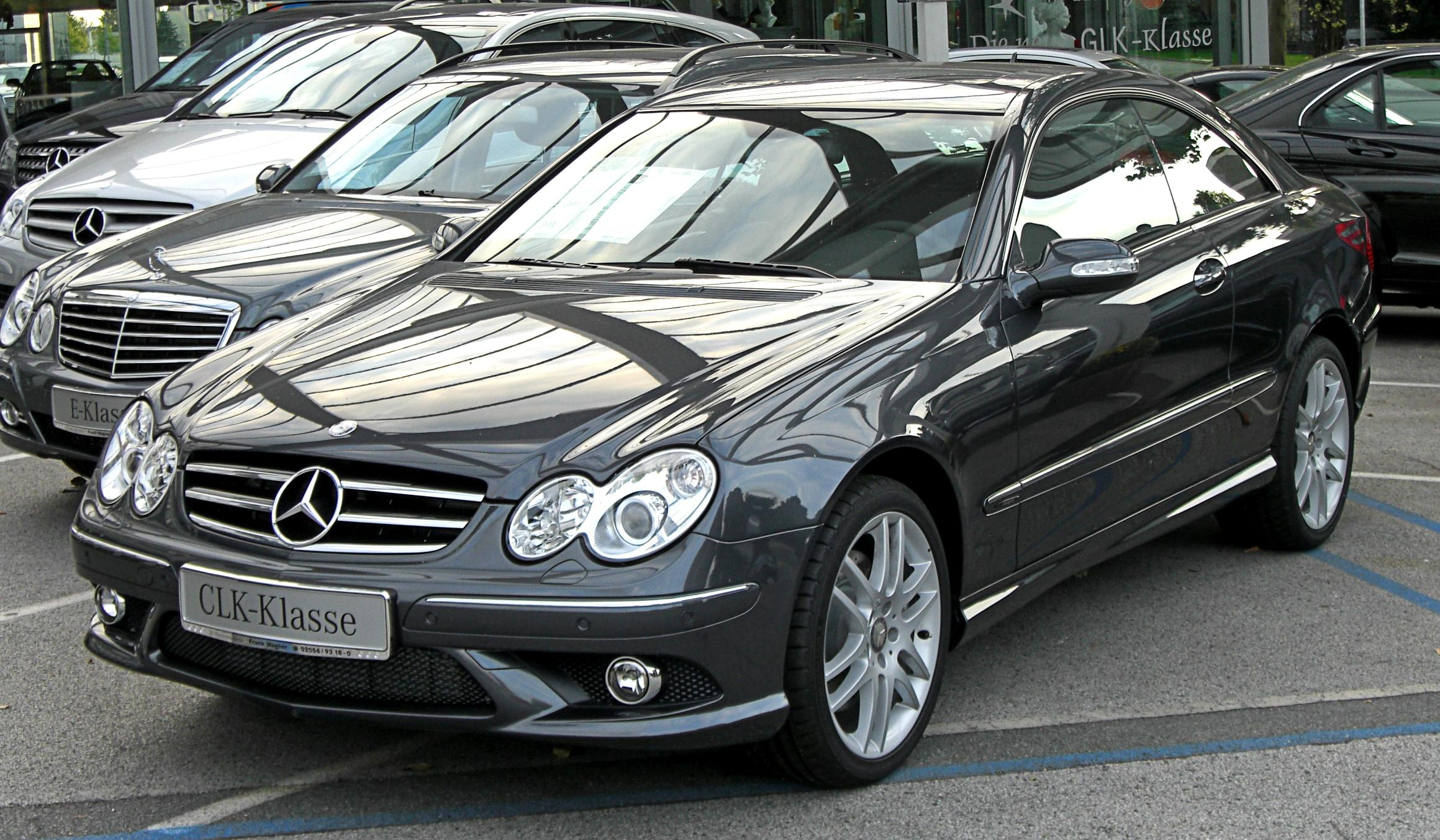

Overview
- Manufacturer: DaimlerChrysler (2001–2007) Daimler AG (2007–2009)
- Production: February 2001 – November 2008 (coupé); February 2002 – August 2009 (convertible)
- Assembly: Germany: Bremen; Germany: Osnabrück (Karmann, cabriolet)
- Designer: Gorden Wagener

Body and chassis
- Class: Grand tourer (S)
- Body style: 2-door coupé; 2-door convertible
- Layout: Front-engine, rear-wheel drive
- Related: Mercedes-Benz C-Class (W203); Mercedes-Benz E-Class (W211)

Powertrain
- Engine: Petrol: 1.8 L M271 supercharged I4; 2.6 – 3.2 L M112 V6; 3.0 – 3.5 L M272 V6; 5.0 – 5.4 L M113 V8; 5.5 L M273 V8; 6.2 L M156 V8; Diesel: 2.1 L OM646 turbo I4; 2.7 L OM612 turbo I5; 3.0 L OM642 turbo V6
- Transmission: 6-speed manual; 6-speed Sequentronic automated manual; 5-speed 5G-Tronic automatic; 7-speed 7G-Tronic automatic

Dimensions
- Wheelbase: 2,715 mm (106.9 in)
- Length: 4,638–4,652 mm (182.6–183.1 in)
- Width: 1,740 mm (68.5 in)
- Height: 1,400–1,415 mm (55.1–55.7 in)
- Kerb weight: 1,540–1,875 kg (3,395–4,134 lb)

Chronology
- Predecessor: Mercedes-Benz CLK-Class (C208/A208)
- Successor: Mercedes-Benz E-Class (C207/A207)

The C209/A209 Mercedes-Benz CLK-Class is the second generation of the Mercedes-Benz CLK-Class range of grand tourers, produced between 2001 and 2009. There were two body styles available: a 2-door coupé (C209) and a 2-door convertible (A209). The latter being assembled at the Karmann plant in Osnabrück. It was also the last complete car made by Karmann before closing the facility.

It was replaced by the Mercedes-Benz C207/A207 E-Class in 2010.

== Development and launch ==
The C209/A209 CLK is based on the Mercedes W203 C-Class platform, and uses rack-and-pinion steering, instead of the recirculating ball design from the previous generation. It also uses a three-link front suspension, and aluminium rear multi-link suspension. Compared to its predecessor, the second generation CLK is 61 mm (2.4 in) longer, 18 mm (0.7 in) wider, and 28 mm (1.1 in) taller.

At introduction, a 3.2-litre V6, 5.0-litre V8, 5.4-litre V8, and 2.7L inline-5 diesel engine were available, which were all replaced by 2006.

== Body styles ==
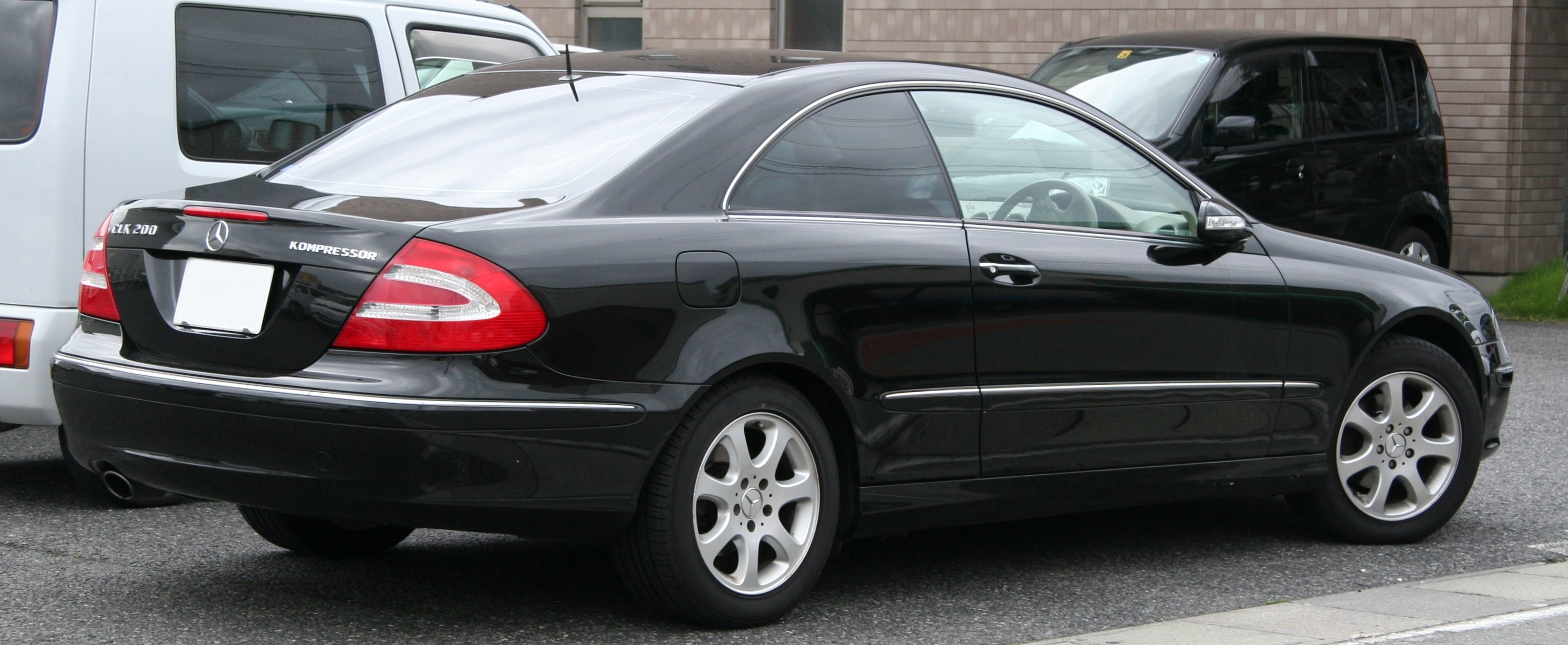
C209 coupé (Japan)

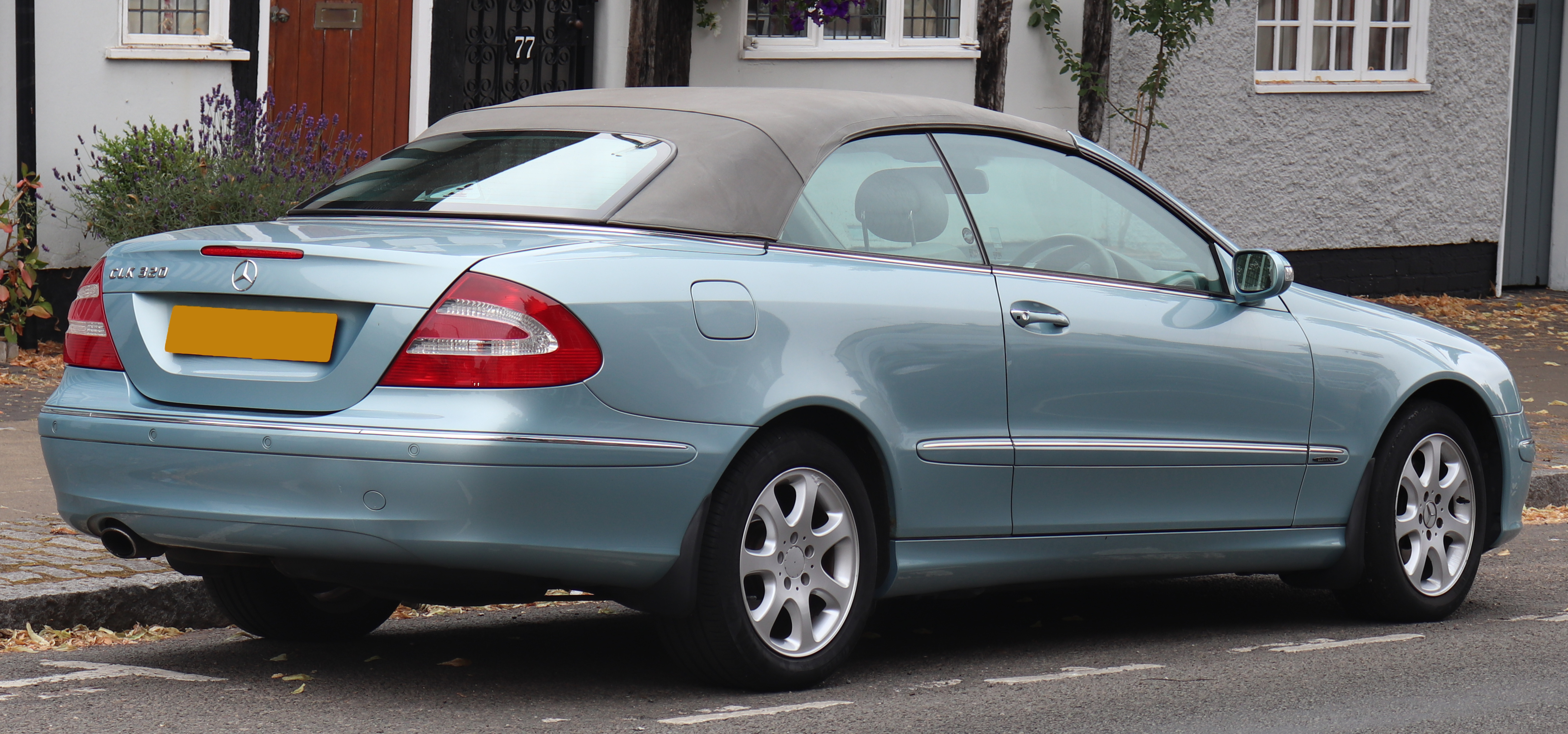
A209 convertible (United Kingdom)

=== Coupé (C209) ===
The production version CLK was unveiled at the 2002 Geneva Motor Show. Unlike the previous generation CLK, the C209 CLK Coupé features a pillarless design with no B pillar between the front and rear side windows.

=== Convertible (A209) ===
Convertible CLK models feature a three-layered electric soft top that can be operated via the keyfob or at speeds up to 8 km/h (5 mph) in 20 seconds. Convertible models were originally manufactured by Karmann in Osnabrück in 2003, but production was later moved to Bremen, Germany in 2004. The CLK Cabriolet was unveiled at the 2003 Geneva Motor Show.

== Equipment ==
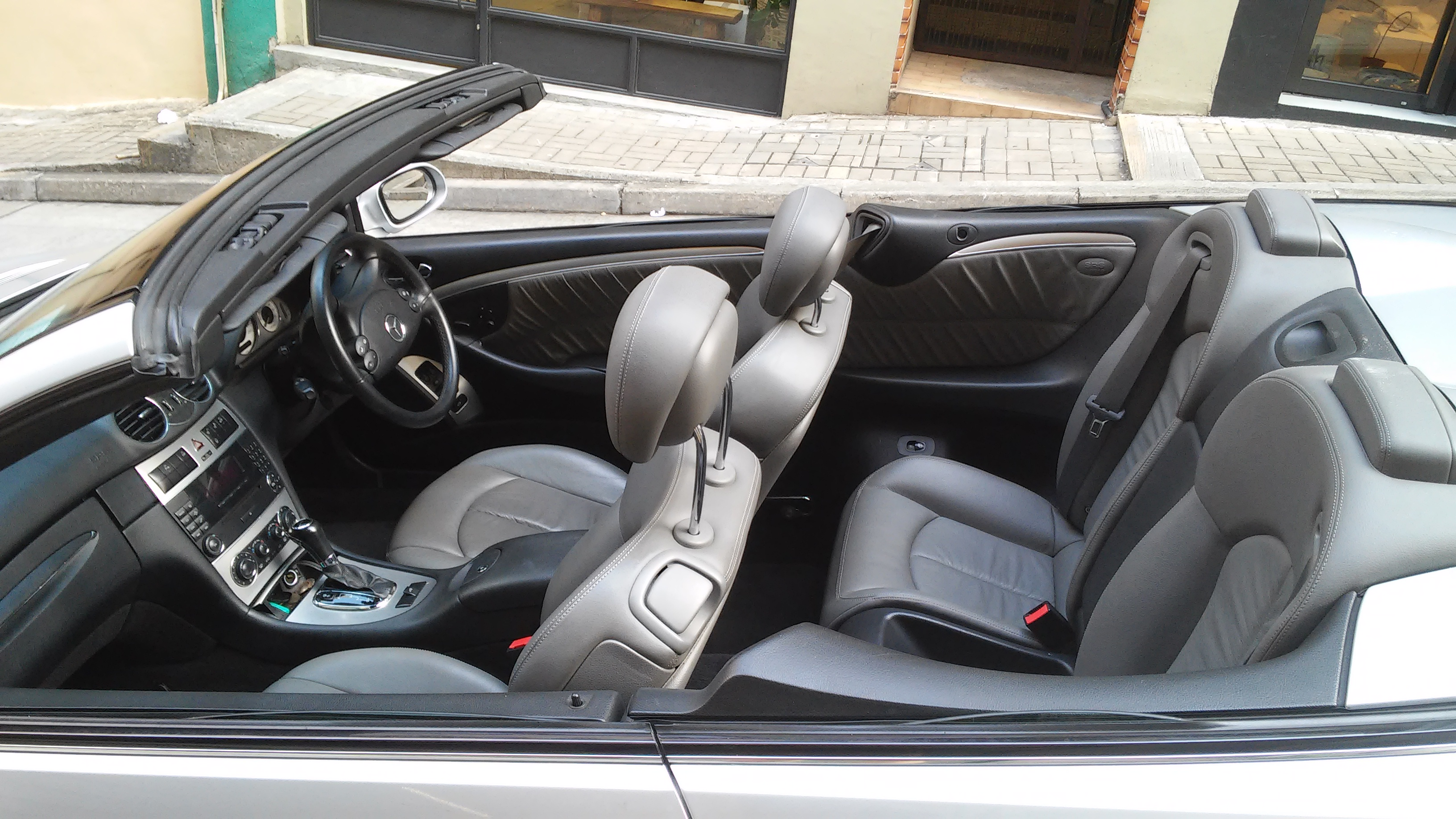
Interior (facelift)

Standard equipment includes antilock brakes, electronic stability control, power seats, and dual-zone climate control. Models were also offered in Elegance and Avantgarde specification. Elegance models feature green-tinted glass, a grey coloured grille, 7-spoke polished 16-inch alloy wheels, and wood interior trim, while Avantgarde models featured blue-tinted glass, a black coloured grille, 5-spoke 18-inch alloy wheels, aluminium interior trim, as well as stiffer springs, thicker anti-roll bars, and a 15 mm (0.6 in) lower ride height.

In 2005, a Sports edition, based on the Avantgarde specification, was introduced and featured six-spoke 18-inch alloy wheels, cross-drilled brake rotors, and bi-xenon headlights. An AMG Sports package was also available, featuring a restyled front bumper, a spoiler lip on the boot, and 18-inch wheels. The Elegance and Avantgarde models were also updated, now featuring nine-spoke 16-inch wheels, and five spoke 17-inch wheels respectively.

== Models ==
=== Petrol engines ===
Model	Year	Engine	Power	Torque	0–100 km/h (0–62 mph)
CLK 200; Kompressor	2002–2006	M271 E18 ML; 1.8 L supercharged I4	120 kW (163 PS; 161 hp) at 5,500 rpm	240 N⋅m (177 lb⋅ft) at 3,500 rpm	9.9 s
CLK 200; Kompressor	2007–2010	M271 E18 ML; 1.8 L supercharged I4	135 kW (184 PS; 181 hp) at 5,500 rpm	250 N⋅m (184 lb⋅ft) at 2,800 rpm	9.1 s (8.8 s manual)
CLK 200 CGI	2003–2005	M271 DE18 ML; 1.8 L supercharged GDI I4	125 kW (170 PS; 168 hp) at 5,300 rpm	250 N⋅m (184 lb⋅ft) at 3,000 rpm	9.2 s
CLK 240	2002–2005	M112 E26; 2.6 L V6	125 kW (170 PS; 168 hp) at 5,500 rpm	240 N⋅m (177 lb⋅ft) at 4,500 rpm	9.5 s
CLK 280	2005–2010	M272 E30; 3.0 L V6	170 kW (231 PS; 228 hp) at 6,000 rpm	300 N⋅m (221 lb⋅ft) at 2,500 rpm	7.4 s
CLK 320	2002–2005	M112 E32; 3.2 L V6	165 kW (224 PS; 221 hp) at 5,700 rpm	310 N⋅m (229 lb⋅ft) at 3,000–4,600 rpm	7.9 s
CLK 350	2005–2010	M272 E35; 3.5 L V6	200 kW (272 PS; 268 hp) at 6,000 rpm	350 N⋅m (258 lb⋅ft) at 2,400–5,000 rpm	6.2 s
CLK 500	2002–2006	M113 E50; 5.0 L V8	225 kW (306 PS; 302 hp) at 5,600 rpm	460 N⋅m (339 lb⋅ft) at 2,700–4,250 rpm	5.7 s
CLK 550*	2007–2010	M273 E55; 5.5 L V8	285 kW (387 PS; 382 hp) at 6,000 rpm	530 N⋅m (391 lb⋅ft) at 2,800–4,800 rpm	5.2 s
CLK 55 AMG	2002–2006	M113 E55; 5.4 L V8	270 kW (367 PS; 362 hp) at 5,750 rpm	510 N⋅m (376 lb⋅ft) at 4,000 rpm	5.2 s
CLK DTM AMG	2004-2006	M113k; 5.4 L Supercharged V8	428 kW (582 PS; 574 hp) at 6,100 rpm at 7,000 rpm	800 N⋅m (590 lb⋅ft) at 3500 rpm	3.9 s
CLK 63 AMG	2006–2010	M156 E62; 6.2 L V8	354 kW (481 PS; 474 hp) at 6,800 rpm	630 N⋅m (465 lb⋅ft) at 5,000 rpm	4.6-4.5 s
CLK 63 AMG Black Series	2007–2009	M156 E62; 6.2 L V8	373 kW (507 PS; 500 hp) at 7,200 rpm	630 N⋅m (465 lb⋅ft) at 5,250 rpm	4.3-4.1 s

*Note: CLK 550 was still marketed as CLK 500 in most markets.

=== Diesel engines ===
Model	Year	Engine	Power	Torque	0–100 km/h (0–62 mph)
CLK 220 CDI	2005–2009	OM646 DE22; 2.1 L I4	110 kW (150 PS; 148 hp) at 4,200 rpm	340 N⋅m (251 lb⋅ft) at 2,000 rpm	10.4 s (10.2 s manual)
CLK 270 CDI	2002–2005	OM612 DE27; 2.7 L I5	125 kW (170 PS; 168 hp) at 4,200 rpm	400 N⋅m (295 lb⋅ft) at 1,800–2,600 rpm	9.4 s
CLK 320 CDI	2005–2010	OM642 DE30; 3.0 L V6	165 kW (224 PS; 221 hp) at 3,800 rpm	510 N⋅m (376 lb⋅ft) at 1,400 rpm	6.4 s (6.9 s manual)

== Special models ==
=== CLK DTM AMG (2004–2006) ===
The CLK DTM AMG is a limited edition higher-performance version of the CLK, built to celebrate the racing version of the CLK winning the 2003 German Touring Car Championship (DTM) season. A total of 100 coupés and 80 convertibles were built for the European market only, with the coupé version produced for the 2004 model year, and the convertible version made for the 2006 model year. The road version features a supercharged 5,439 cc (5.4 L; 331.9 cu in) SOHC 3 valves per cylinder V8 engine rated at 428 kW (582 PS; 574 bhp) at 7000 rpm and 800 N⋅m (590 lb⋅ft) at 3500 rpm of torque, with power sent through a 5G-Tronic automatic transmission to the rear wheels, capable of a top speed of 322 km/h (200 mph). Weighing 1,742 kg (3,840 lb), the CLK DTM AMG can accelerate from 0–100 km/h (0–62 mph) in 3.9 seconds.

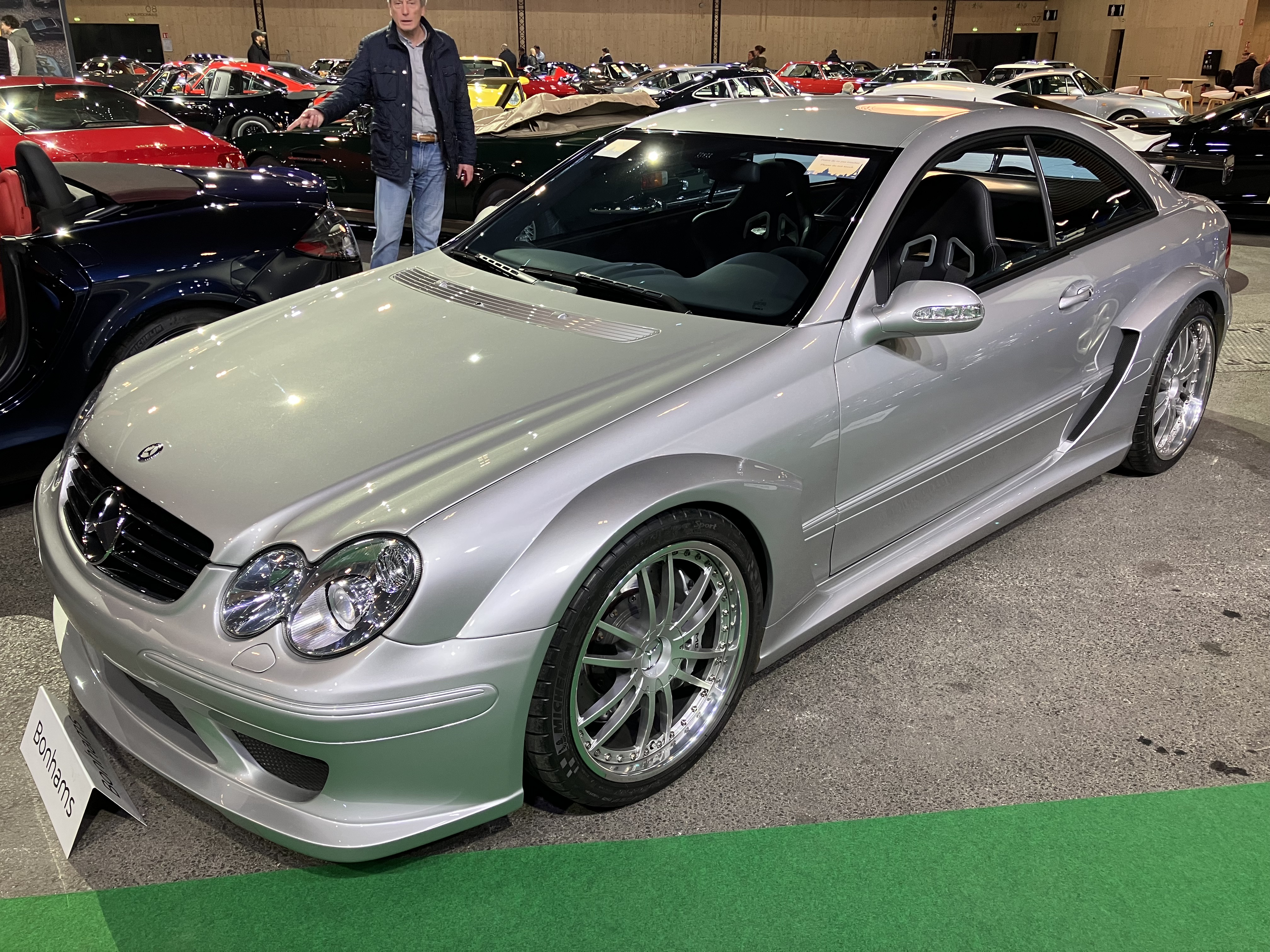
CLK DTM AMG Coupé

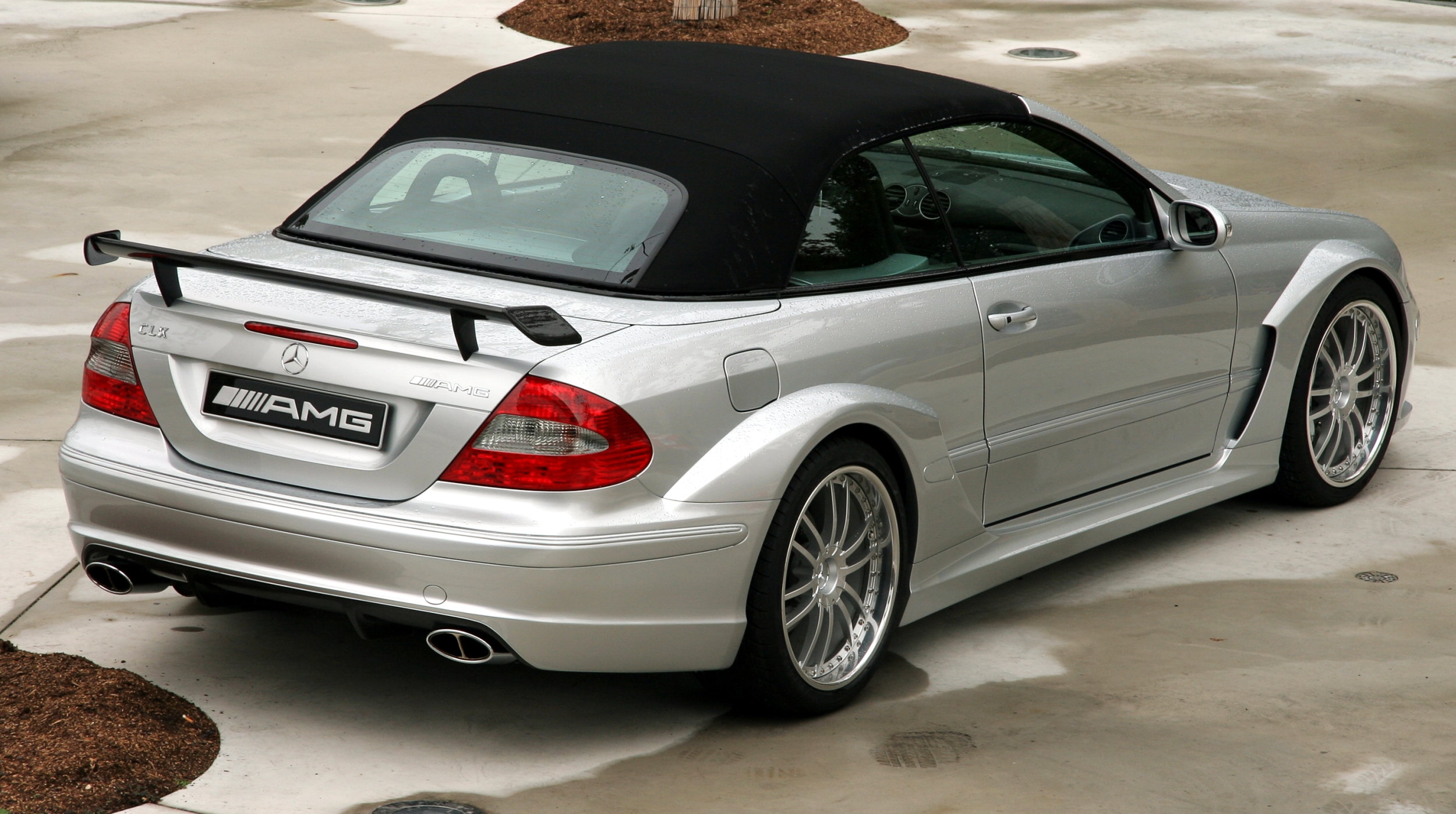
CLK DTM AMG Convertible

=== CLK 63 AMG Black Series (2007–2009) ===
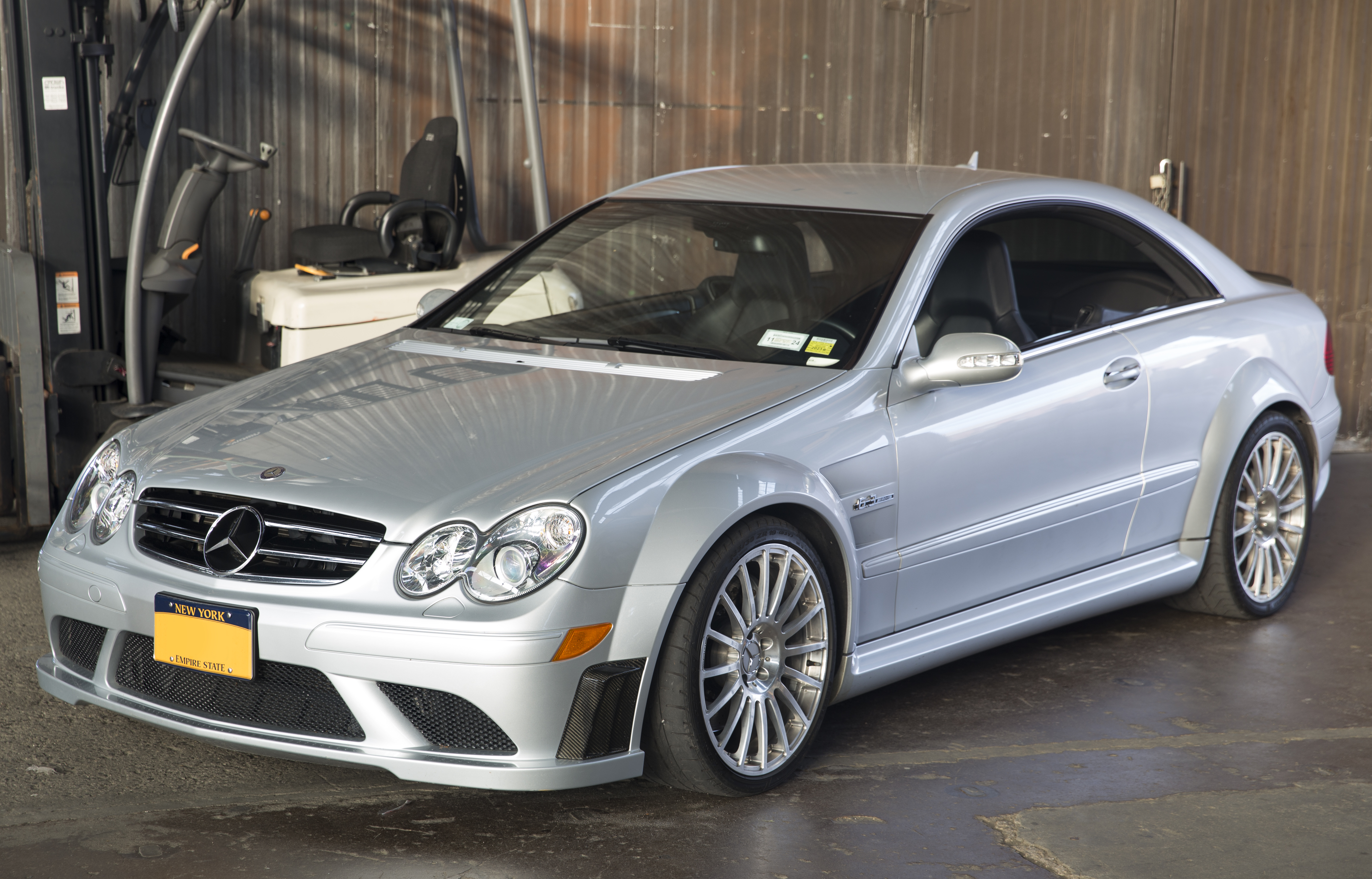
CLK 63 AMG Black Series (USA)

The CLK 63 AMG Black Series is a higher-performance version of the CLK 63 AMG coupé, produced between 2007 and 2009. A total of 500 examples were produced, with 349 sent to the United States and only 120 examples built with right-hand drive. It is powered by the M156 6.2 L (6,208 cc) V8, producing 500 bhp (507 PS; 373 kW) at 6,800 rpm and 630 N⋅m (465 lb⋅ft) of torque at 5,250 rpm. It uses Pirelli P-Zero Corsa tyres and features Mercedes' SpeedShift 7G-Tronic transmission. Additional features include a manually adjustable suspension system designed and manufactured by KW, a limited-slip differential, larger air intakes, bucket seats, 19-inch alloy wheels, a spoiler, diffuser, and wider fenders made of carbon fibre. The rear seats have also been removed in order to save weight, and the top speed has been increased to 300 km/h (186 mph).

=== F1 safety car ===
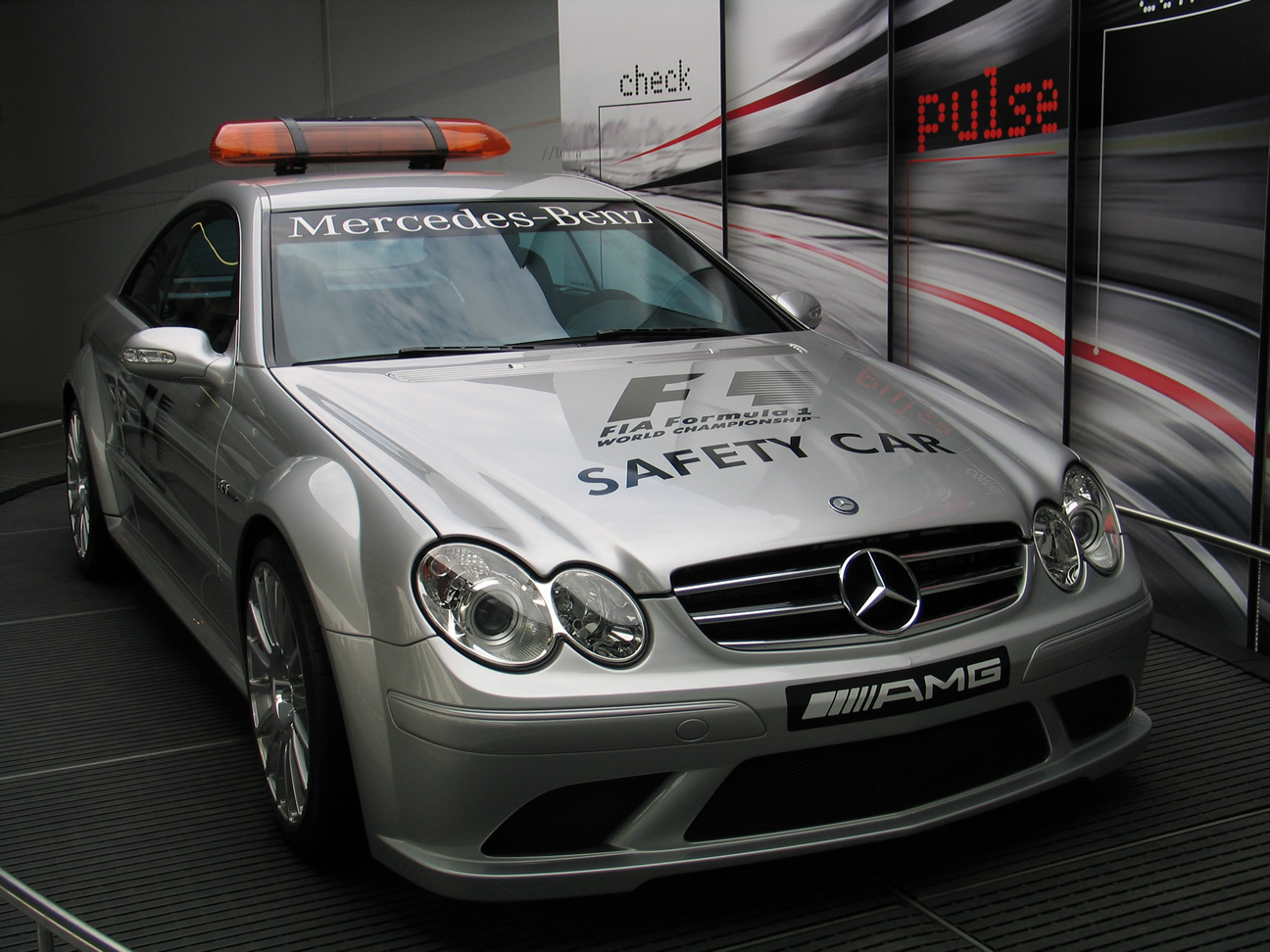
CLK AMG F1 Safety car

In 2003, the CLK 55 AMG was used as an F1 safety car. The CLK 63 AMG was also used as an F1 safety car for the 2006 and 2007 seasons.

== Model year changes ==
=== 2004 ===
- Handling improvements in the form of modified axle bearings and more direct steering

=== 2005 facelift ===
A facelift was introduced in June 2005. Major changes include:

- Exterior design changes including: redesigned front and rear bumpers, grille with three louvres instead of four, and restyled taillights
- COMAND 2.0 upgraded to DVD-based COMAND-APS system, introducing iPod integration
- Updated center console with improved layout and switches
- New 7G-Tronic automatic transmission replaces the old 5G-Tronic system
- The CLK 240, CLK 320, and CLK 55 AMG are replaced by newer models

=== 2007 ===
- Introduction of CLK 550 and CLK 63 AMG models
- Introduction of Sports and AMG Sports package

== Sales figures ==
The following are the sales figures for the CLK in Europe and in the United States:

Year	EU total	US total
2002	35,777	17,251
2003	54,305	19,230
2004	47,690	22,556
2005	34,601	18,227
2006	27,547	16,415
2007	22,117	15,009
2008	14,520	10,844
2009	8,416	7,150
2010	221	585
Total:	245,194	127,627

== Motorsports ==
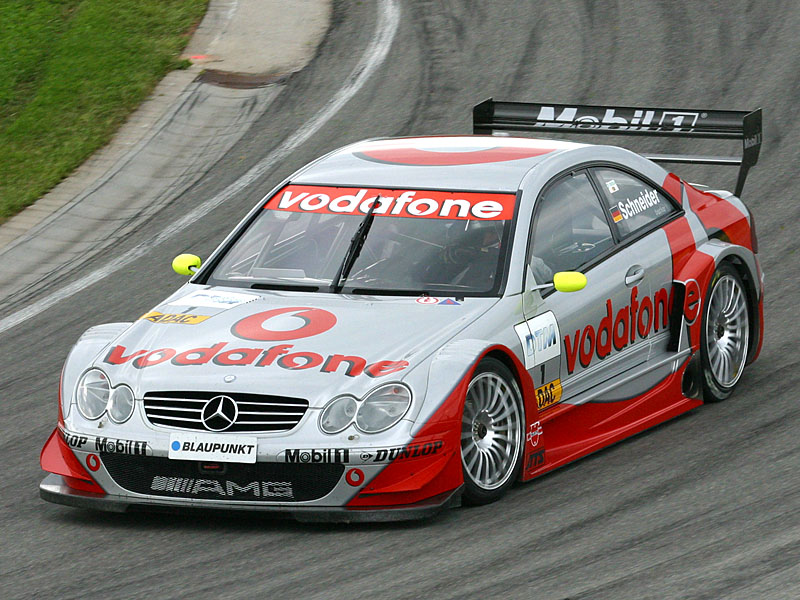
Mercedes-Benz CLK DTM

The Mercedes-Benz CLK DTM is a racing version of the C209 CLK that debuted in the 2002 DTM season and won the 2003 DTM season.
