= M152 =

M152 may refer to:

- M-152 (Michigan highway), a state highway
- Mercedes-Benz M152 engine, an automobile engine
- M152, a variant of the Dodge M37 military vehicle
- M152 (Cape Town), a Metropolitan Route in Cape Town, South Africa
