= Mercedes-Benz M156 engine =

Mercedes-Benz M156/M159
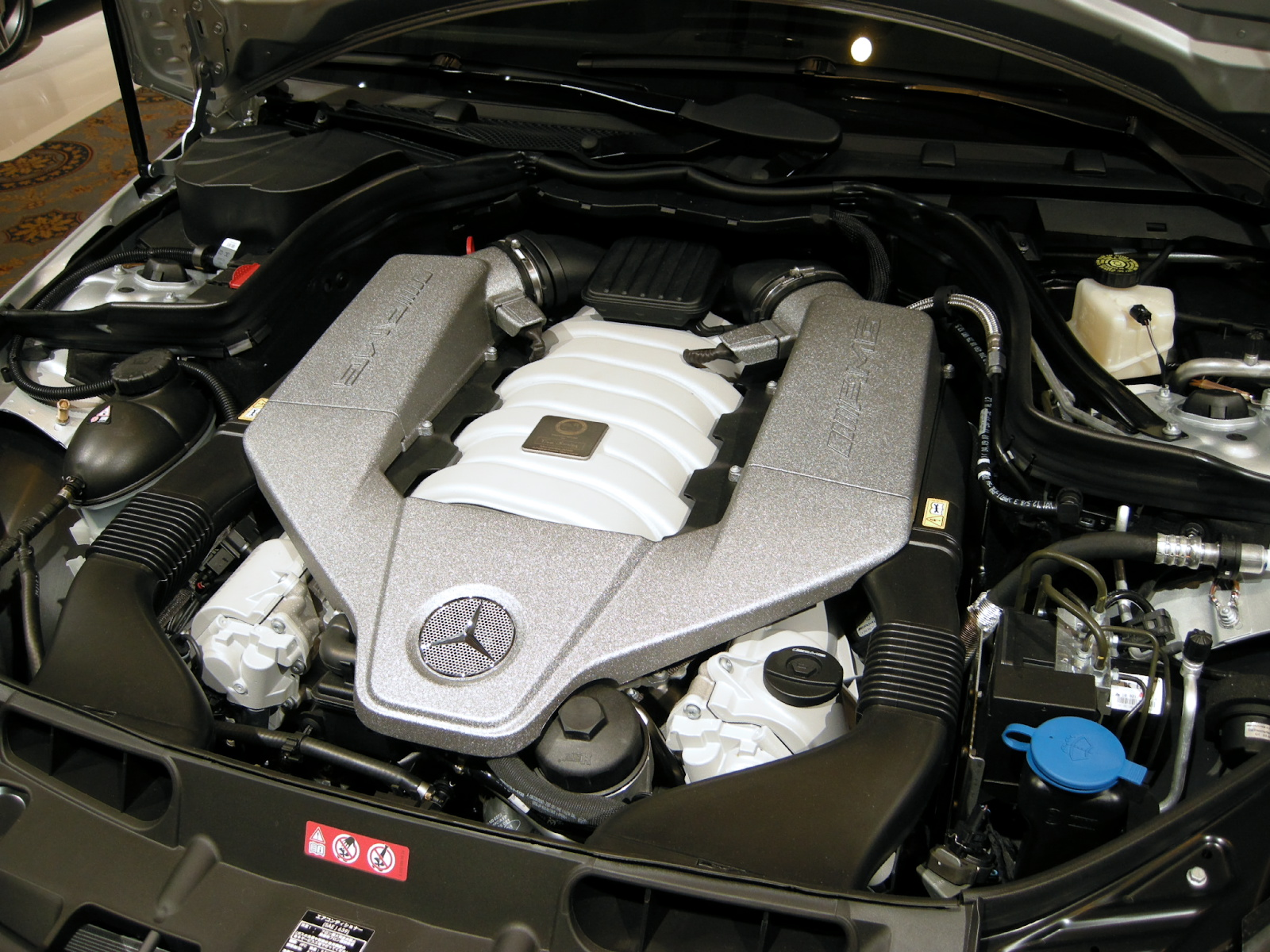

Overview
- Manufacturer: Mercedes-AMG
- Production: 2005–2015 (M156); 2009–present (M159)

Layout
- Configuration: Naturally aspirated 90° V8
- Displacement: 6.2 L (6,208 cc)
- Cylinder bore: 102.2 mm (4.02 in)
- Piston stroke: 94.6 mm (3.72 in)
- Valvetrain: DOHC 4 valves x cyl.
- Compression ratio: 11.3:1

RPM range
- Max. engine speed: 7,250–8,000

Combustion
- Fuel system: Sequential port injection
- Fuel type: Gasoline
- Oil system: M156: Wet sump; M159: Dry sump
- Cooling system: Water-cooled

Output
- Power output: 451–622 hp (457–631 PS; 336–464 kW)
- Torque output: 630–650 N⋅m (465–479 lb⋅ft)

Chronology
- Predecessor: Mercedes-Benz M113 engine
- Successor: Mercedes-Benz M157 engine (5.5L); Mercedes-Benz M176/M177/M178 engine (4.0L)

The M156 is the first automobile V8 engine designed autonomously by Mercedes-Benz subsidiary Mercedes-AMG, as previous AMG engines have always been based on original Mercedes engines. The engine was designed to be a naturally aspirated racing unit, and is also used in a number of high-performance AMG-badged Mercedes-Benz models. The engine was designed by Bernd Ramler, famed by the design of the Porsche Carrera GT's 5.7-liter V-10 engine.

== M156 ==
The M156 displaces 6,208 cc (6.2 L; 378.8 cu in) and shares very little with other Mercedes-Benz engine families like the M155. The bore spacing, block design, and other features are unique to the AMG engine.

Although this engine displaces 6.2 litres, it is marketed as the "6.3" to commemorate Mercedes' famed 6.3 L M100 engine, its first production V8.

The engine uses a bore and stroke of 102.2 mm × 94.6 mm (4.02 in × 3.72 in). When introduced in the 2007 CLK 63 AMG, output was 475 hp (482 PS; 354 kW) at 6,800 rpm with 630 N⋅m (465 lb⋅ft) of torque at 5,200 rpm. For the 2007 CLS 63 and E 63, output was 507 hp (514 PS; 378 kW) at 6,800 rpm with 630 N⋅m (465 lb⋅ft) of torque at 5,200 rpm. The 2007 ML 63 had 503 hp (510 PS; 375 kW), and the 2008 C 63 had 451 hp (457 PS; 336 kW). The final 2013–2015 C 63 AMG Edition 507 had 500 hp (507 PS; 373 kW).

The engine, however, has been uprated to produce 518 hp (525 PS; 386 kW) and 465 lb⋅ft (630 N⋅m) of torque in the late S 63, E 63, SL 63 & CL 63 models .

Applications:

- 2006–2010 E 63 AMG
- 2006–2011 ML 63 AMG
- 2007 R 63 AMG
- 2006–2010 S 63 AMG
- 2006–2011 CL 63 AMG
- 2006–2010 CLK 63 AMG
- 2006–2010 CLS 63 AMG
- 2007–2015 C 63 AMG
- 2008–2011 SL 63 AMG
- 2013 Lucra LC470 R

=== M156 lawsuit ===
In 2011, a class action lawsuit was filed in United States District Court in New Jersey against Daimler AG, Mercedes-Benz, Mercedes-AMG for alleged defects in the M156 engine contained in AMG vehicles built in 2007–2011 model years leading to premature wear. The plaintiff claimed the combination of cast nodular iron camshafts and 9310 grade steel valve lifters contributed to the premature wear, but the defendants had known about the defect since 2007.

The lawsuit lasted approximately 14-months. In November, 2012, litigation came to a halt when the New Jersey District Court dismissed the plaintiffs’ first amended complaint for lack of standing. The plaintiffs were given the opportunity to further amend their complaint to show that they had standing to sue, but plaintiffs made no further filings with the Court. On January 7, 2013, the Court signed an order closing the case.

== M156 common issues ==
Some of the main issues that linger in all M156 models consist of failure of the crankcase breather valve. The most common issue with the breather valve is that the diaphragm on the valve deteriorates over time. Another issue with the breather valve is that the hose from the crankcase to the valve also deteriorates and starts to crack. These issues can cause excess oil burning, heavy smoke from tail pipes and misfires. Other common issues are premature wear of engine lifters and camshafts as well as cam shaft adjusters. Common signs of this is a ticking noise at cold start of the vehicle. Other common issues consist of intake manifold failure, head bolt issues in models from 2007 to 2011 and drive belt pulleys.

== M159 ==
The M159 is a version used in Mercedes-Benz SLS AMG and first-generation AMG GT3 racing car. Compared to the standard AMG engine, the SLS's engine includes an all-new intake system, reworked valvetrain and camshafts, the use of flow-optimised tubular steel headers and dethrottling of the exhaust system. The engine also utilizes a dry-sump lubrication system to lower the center of gravity of the car.

Engine code	Years	Power output	Torque	Redline
M159	2010–2012	571 PS (420 kW; 563 hp) at 6,800 rpm	650 N⋅m (479 lb⋅ft) at 4,750 rpm	7,250 rpm
M159	2013–2015	591 PS (435 kW; 583 hp) at 6,800 rpm	650 N⋅m (479 lb⋅ft) at 4,750 rpm	7,250 rpm
M159	2013–2014	631 PS (464 kW; 622 hp) at 7,400 rpm	635 N⋅m (468 lb⋅ft) at 5,000 rpm	8,000 rpm

== See also ==
- List of Mercedes-Benz engines
