= Mercedes-Benz CLK-Class =

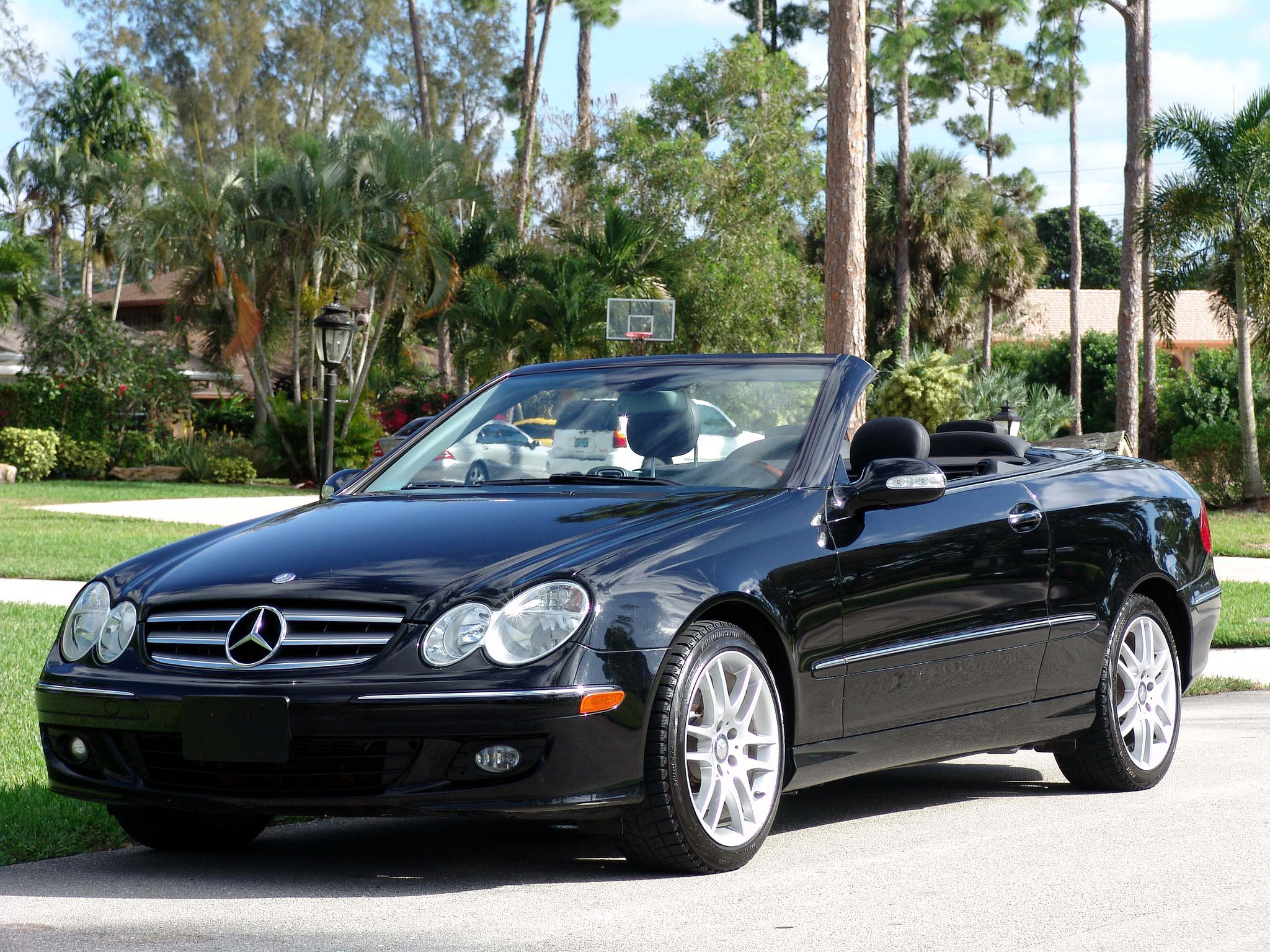

Overview
- Manufacturer: Daimler-Benz (1996–1998); DaimlerChrysler (1998–2007); Daimler AG (2007–2009)
- Production: 1996–2009

Body and chassis
- Class: Grand tourer (S)
- Body style: 2-door coupé; 2-door convertible
- Layout: Front-engine, rear-wheel-drive

Chronology
- Predecessor: Mercedes-Benz E-Class (C124/A124)
- Successor: Mercedes-Benz E-Class (C207/A207)

The Mercedes-Benz CLK-Class is a former series of mid-size or entry-level luxury coupés and convertibles produced by Mercedes-Benz between 1996 and 2010. Although its design and styling was derived from the E-Class, the mechanical underpinnings were based on the smaller C-Class, and was positioned between the Mercedes-Benz SLK-Class and CL-Class. The name CLK is either derived from the German words "Coupé", "Luxus" (luxury) and "Kurz" (short) or "Coupé", "Leicht" (light) and "Kurz" (short), as the clear definition was never published. It primarily competes with the two-door BMW 3 and 6 Series, as well as the Audi A4 Cabriolet and Audi A5 Coupe/Cabriolet, as well as the Maserati Coupe and its convertible variant.

Prior to the CLK-Class, the Mercedes E-Class included a Coupé alongside the saloon/wagon. In 2010, Mercedes changed the CLK-Class nameplate to the E-Class Coupe/Cabriolet; nonetheless this E-Class Coupe/Cabriolet is still based upon the C-Class platform while borrowing the brand and styling/design from the E-Class saloon/wagon. Then for the 2017-2023 model years, the Mercedes E-Class Coupé/Cabriolet shared the platform from the E-Class saloon/wagon. For the 2024 model year, Mercedes released the CLE-Class which, like the CLK-Class, shares platforms and components with the C-Class and E-Class.

== First generation (C208/A208; 1996–2003) ==
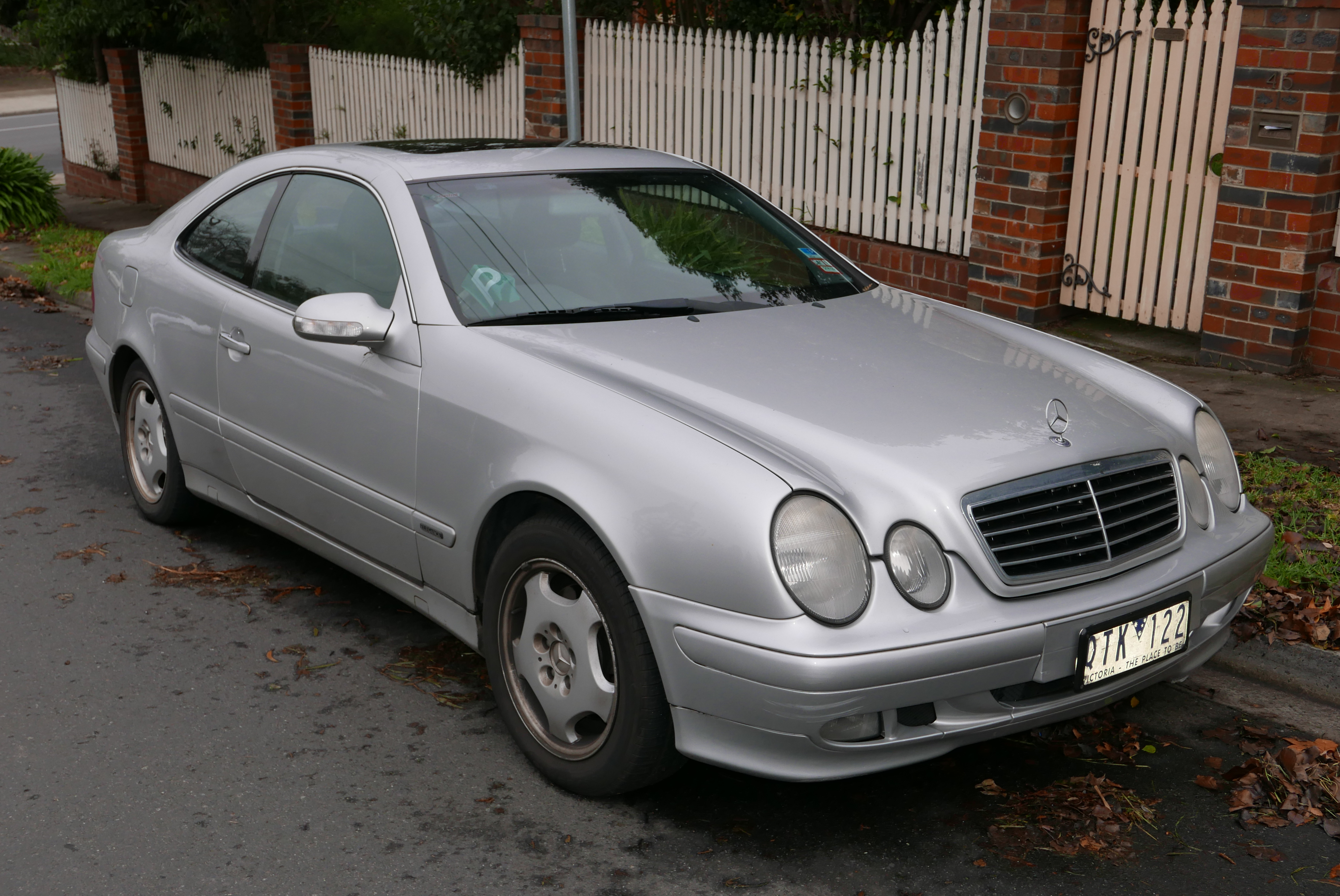
A208 CLK-Class

The first-generation C208/A208 CLK was introduced in 1997, and was based on the W202 Mercedes-Benz C-Class launched three years earlier. The C208 coupé was replaced by the C209 CLK-Class in 2002 (for the 2003 model year), although the convertible remained in production until March 2003 when replaced by the A209 CLK. In total 233,367 units of the first generation CLK were manufactured in its coupé form and additional 115,161 cabriolets.

== Second generation (C209/A209; 2001–2009) ==
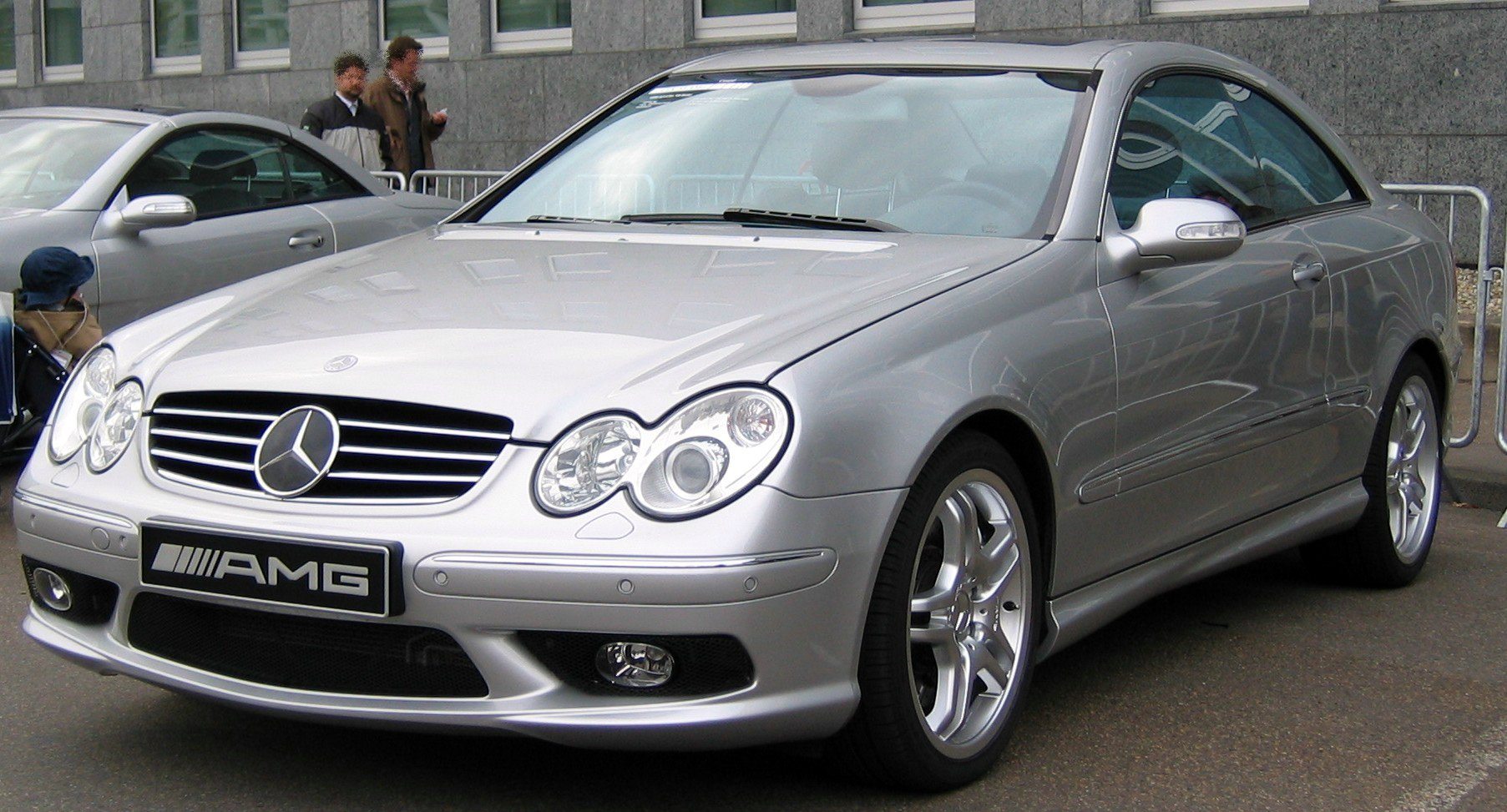
C209 CLK-Class

The Mercedes-Benz C209/A209 is the second generation CLK-Class, and was launched in 2002 with production starting in June. The car was available in both hardtop coupé (C209) and in soft-top convertible form (A209), with a choice of petrol and diesel engines. At introduction, a 2.6-litre V6, a 3.2-litre V6, a 3.5-litre V6, 5.0-litre V8, 5.4-litre V8 petrol engines, and a 2.1 4 cylinder diesel 2.7L inline-5 diesel and a 3.0 v6 diesel engine with a decent 6.5 sec 0-60 figure were all available. Fuel economy wise between the 2.7 and the 3.0 the v6 was the better option due to a much better performance figure and negligible fuel economy difference. In 2010, the CLK lineup was discontinued and replaced by the C207 E-Class coupé and A207 E-Class convertible.

== Successor (C207/A207; 2008–2017) ==
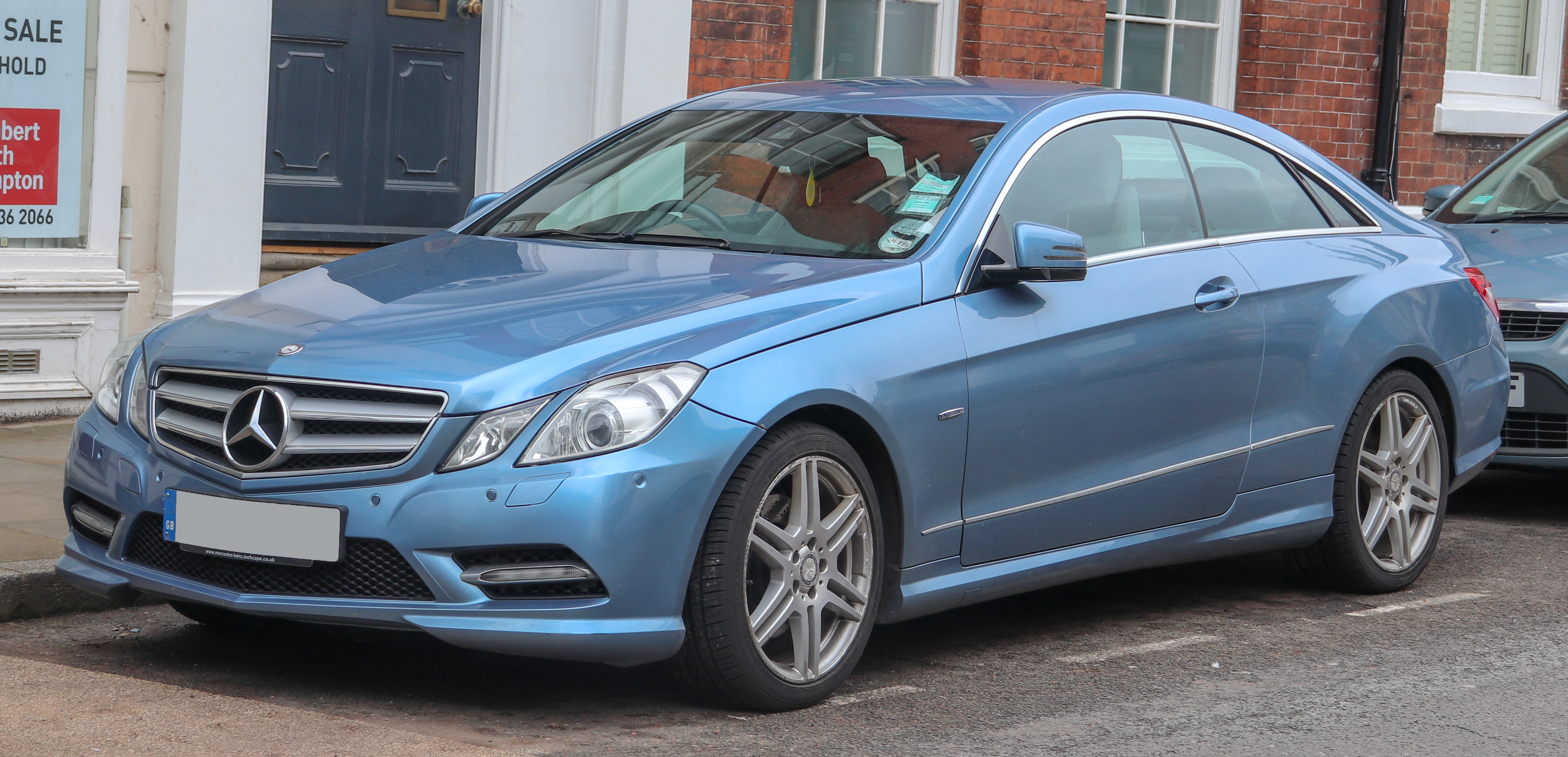
C207 E-Class

The C207/A207 E-Class was introduced as part of the new fourth-generation E-Class lineup, and was first shown at the 2009 Geneva Motor Show. It is based on the W204 C-Class platform, but shares 60% of its parts with the E-Class sedan and wagon. In 2013, the C207/A207 received a facelift, featuring updated design changes and performance and fuel economy improvements.

== Sales figures ==
The following are the sales figures in Europe and in the United States:

Year	EU total	US total
1997	16,708	1,236
1998	41,941	11,622
1999	57,880	16,714
2000	54,476	17,796
2001	37,377	19,423
2002	35,777	17,251
2003	54,305	19,230
2004	47,690	22,556
2005	34,601	18,227
2006	27,547	16,415
2007	22,117	15,009
2008	14,520	10,844
2009	8,416	7,150
2010	221	585
Total:	453,576	194,058
