= Mercedes-Benz SLK-Class (R172) =

Mercedes-Benz R172
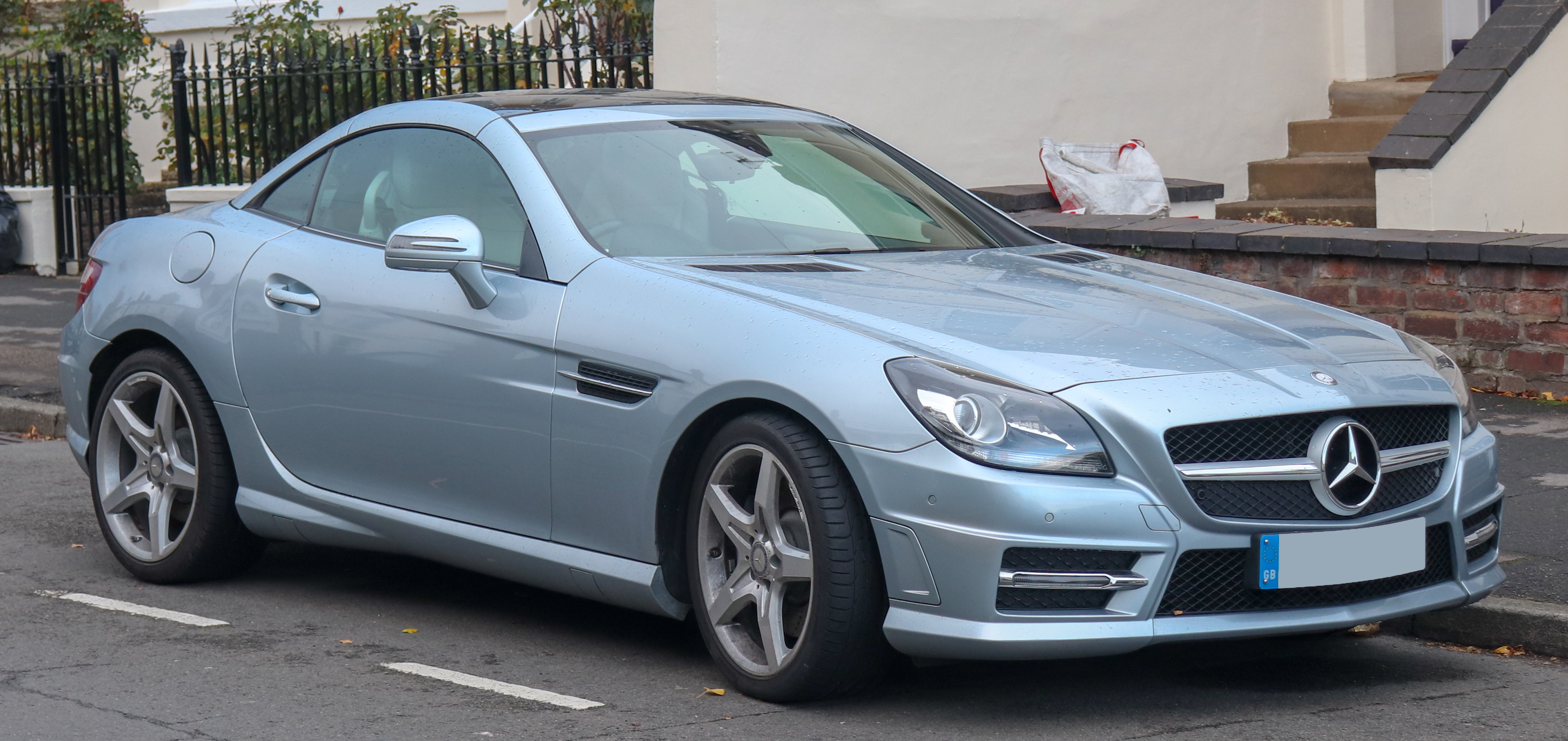

Overview
- Manufacturer: Daimler AG
- Also called: Mercedes-Benz SLC-Class (facelift)
- Production: 2011–2020
- Assembly: Germany: Bremen (Mercedes-Benz Bremen plant)
- Designer: Il-hun Yoon (2007, 2008)

Body and chassis
- Class: Sports car (S)
- Body style: 2-door retractable hardtop
- Layout: Front-engine, rear-wheel-drive
- Related: Mercedes-Benz C-Class (W204)

Powertrain
- Engine: petrol: 1.6 L M270 turbo I4; 1.8 L M271 turbo I4; 2.0 L M274 turbo I4; 3.0 L M276 twin-turbo V6; 3.5 L M276 V6; 5.5 L M152 V8; diesel: 2.1 L OM651 turbo I4
- Transmission: 6-speed manual; 5-speed 5G-Tronic automatic; 7-speed 7G-Tronic automatic; 9-speed 9G-Tronic automatic (SLC, Facelift)

Dimensions
- Wheelbase: 97.8 in (2,484 mm)
- Length: 162.8 in (4,135 mm)
- Width: 71.5 in (1,816 mm)
- Height: 51.2 in (1,300 mm)

Chronology
- Predecessor: Mercedes-Benz SLK-Class (R171)

The third generation of Mercedes-Benz SLK-Class (SLC-Class) (series R172) was launched in Stuttgart in January 2011, with a subsequent public launch at the 2011 Geneva Motor Show, with international sales starting spring 2011. It is the successor of R171 series of roadsters which was originally launched in 2004. The SLC (as it was renamed during its mid cycle facelift) was discontinued after the 2020 model year.

== Initial release ==
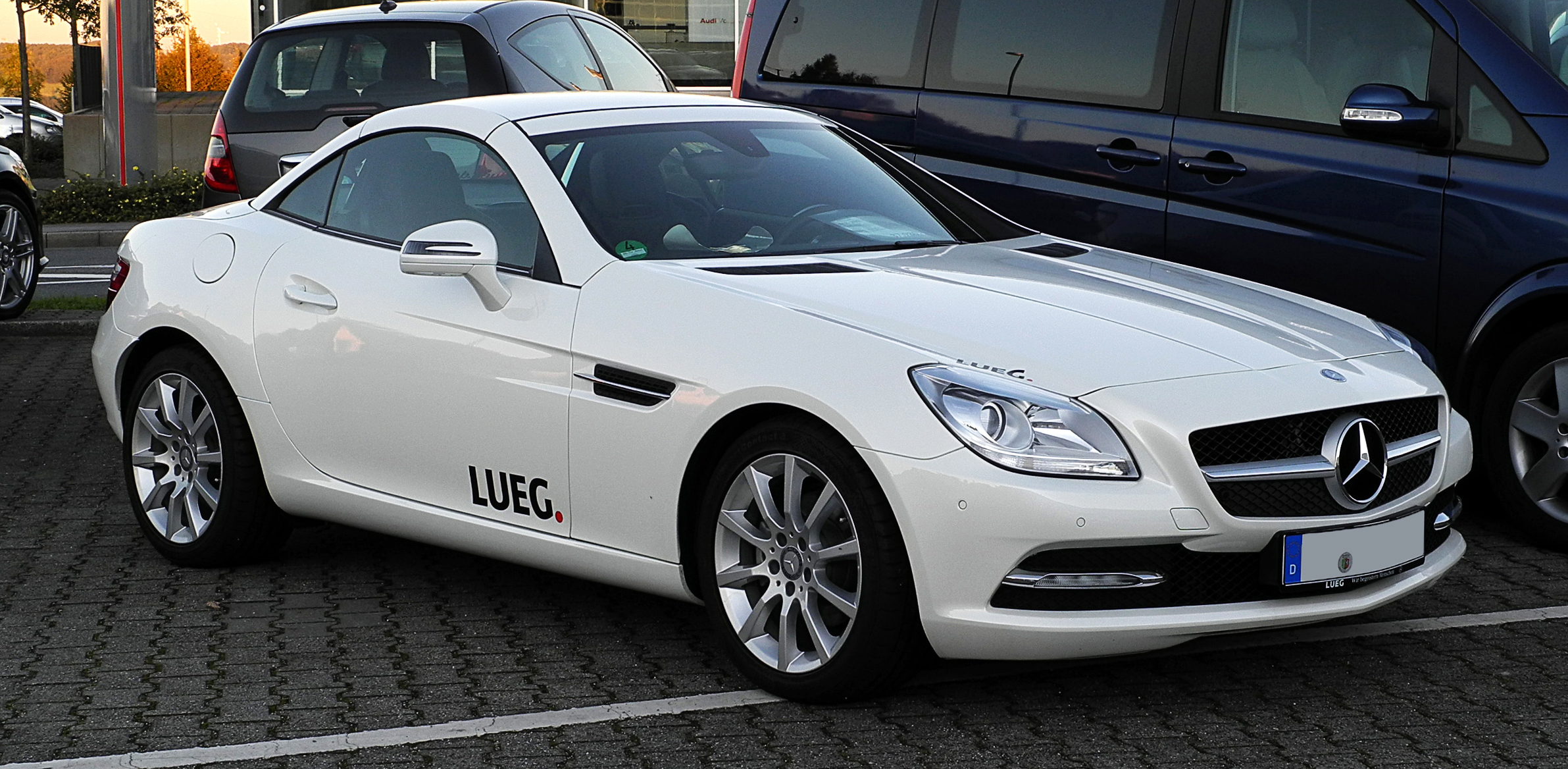
Mercedes-Benz SLK 200 BlueEFFICIENCY (Germany)

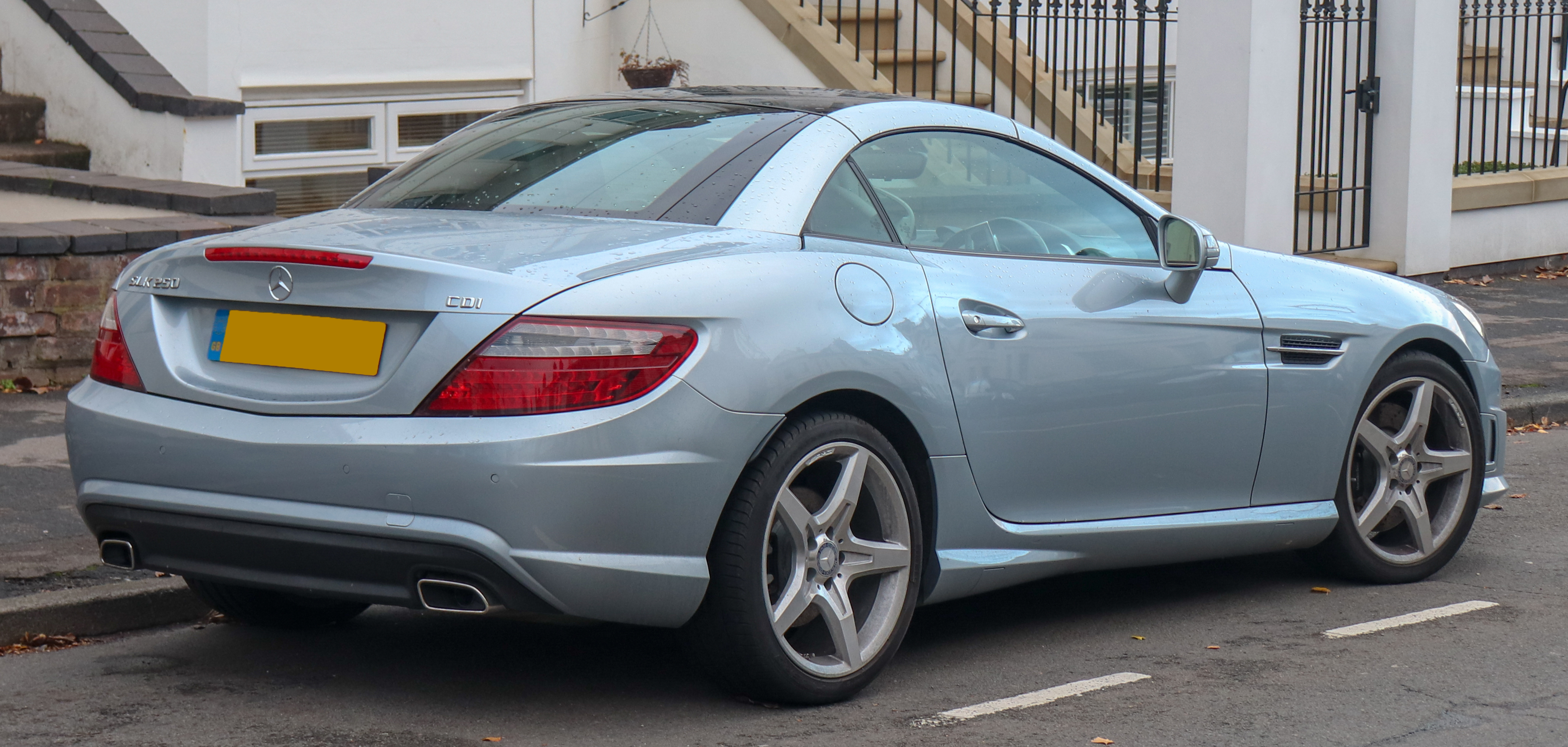
Mercedes-Benz SLK 250 AMG Sport (UK)

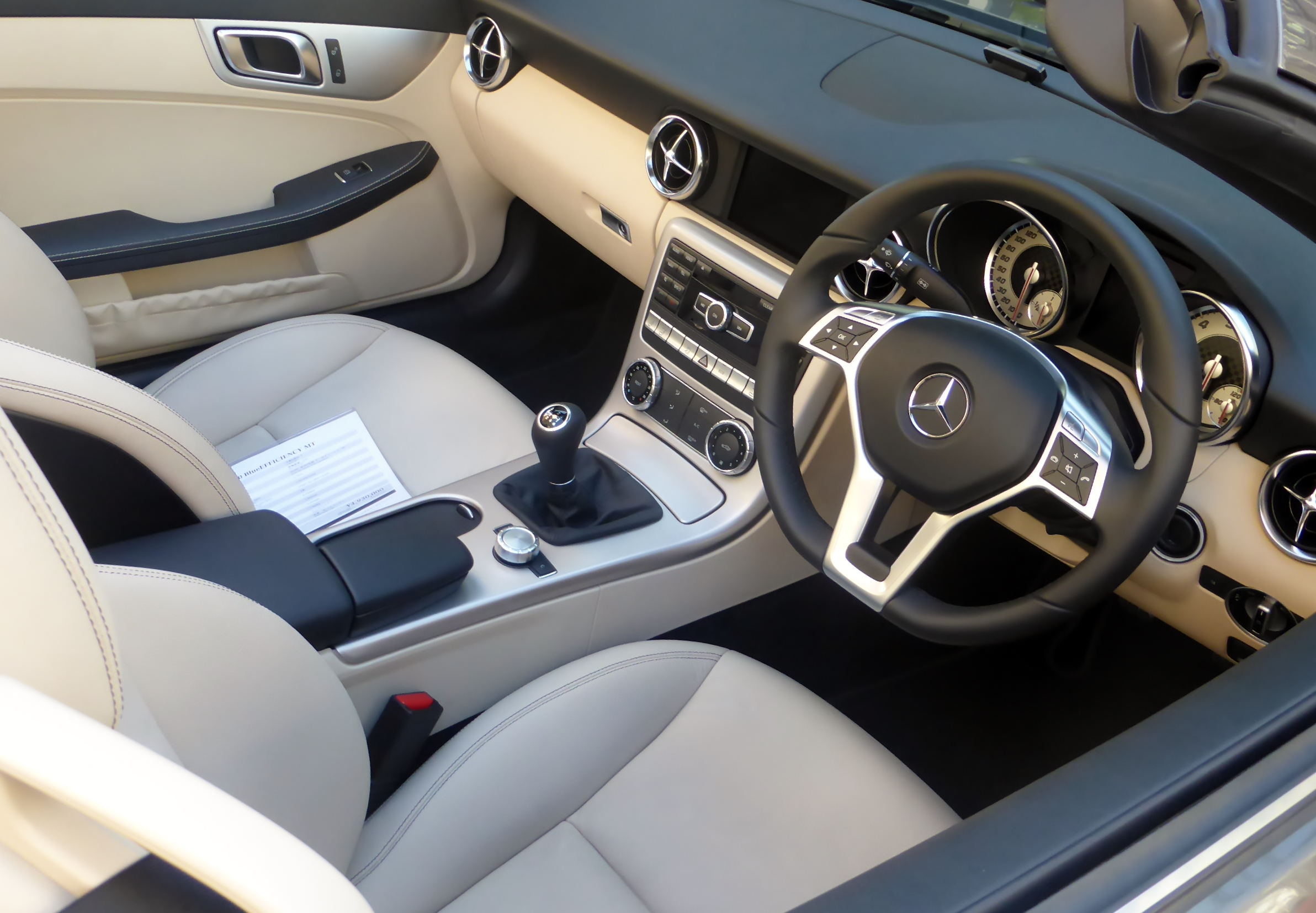
Mercedes-Benz SLK 200 BlueEFFICIENCY interior

The design follows the themes of both the first and second generation SLKs, but incorporates a radiator air intake design inspired by the 190 SL roadster from the 1950s, and front end inspired by the Mercedes-Benz SLS AMG Coupé and Mercedes-Benz CLS-Class (W218).

"Edition 1" models includes special paint finish SHAPE in glacier grey, panoramic vario-roof, Dynamic Handling package, AMG bodystyling, two-tone designo nappa leather with contrasting topstitching, AIRSCARF, ambient lighting and more.

Orders began in from 17 January 2011, and arrived to dealer showrooms on 26 March 2011. Early models include the SLK 200 BlueEFFICIENCY, SLK 250 BlueEFFICIENCY, SLK 350 BlueEFFICIENCY. US models went on sale in 2011 as 2012 model year vehicles.

For the 2014 model year, minor changes were made to standard equipment, and the AMG Sports package was renamed to AMG Line.

=== Roadster Pure (2011–2020) ===
The Roadster Pure is a version of the SLK 200 BlueEFFICIENCY with the 7-speed automatic transmission, panoramic vario-roof, and the COMAND Online multimedia system. It also features 18-inch light-alloy wheels in 5-twin-spoke design, lowered sports suspension by 10 mm (0.4 in), LED daytime running lights, metallic paint and leather heated seats.

=== SLK 250 CDI (2011–2020) ===
The SLK 250 CDI is the first version of the SLK-class with a diesel engine. Ordering began on 13 September 2011. Early models include the 7G-TRONIC PLUS automatic transmission, followed by six-speed manual transmission models in the second quarter of 2012. A BlueEFFICIENCY version of the SLK 250 CDI with the 6-speed manual transmission was added to the range in the spring of 2012. The SLK 250 CDI BlueEFFICIENCY with 7-speed automatic transmission is sold in Germany and the UK. The dimensions of the car is : Length: 4,134 mm (163 in), Width: 1,817 mm (72 in), Height: 1,303 mm (51 in), Wheelbase: 2,430 mm (96 in).

=== SLK 55 AMG (2012–2015) ===
The SLK 55 AMG was unveiled at the 2011 Frankfurt Motor Show, and went on sale in January 2012.

It is powered by the M152 V8 engine, rated at 422 PS (310 kW; 416 hp) at 6,800 rpm and 540 N⋅m (398 lb⋅ft) at 4,500 rpm, and equipped with AMG cylinder management, start/stop function, sports exhaust system with integrated exhaust flaps, AMG SPEEDSHIFT PLUS 7G-TRONIC automatic transmission, AMG sports suspension with torque vectoring brakes and AMG direct-steer system, 3-stage ESP, and ventilated and perforated brake discs on all wheels with 360 x 36 mm front and 330 x 22 mm rear brake discs.

=== Equipment ===
The third generation continues with the two-piece metal folding roof known as a Vario Roof, which includes a choice of a roof painted in the vehicle colour, a panoramic vario-roof with dark-tinted windows, or the panoramic vario-roof with MAGIC SKY CONTROL, which features a glass roof that can be switched from fully transparent to tinted using a type of smart glass technology.

=== Engines ===
Petrol engines
Model	Years	Type	Power at rpm	Torque at rpm
SLC 180	2015–2020	1,595 cc (97 cu in) I4 turbo (M274 DE16 LA)	156 PS (115 kW; 154 hp) at 5,300	250 N⋅m (184 lb⋅ft) at 1,250–4,000
SLK 200 BlueEFFICIENCY	2011–2015	1,796 cc (110 cu in) I4 turbo (M271 DE18 LA)	184 PS (135 kW; 181 hp) at 5,250	250 N⋅m (184 lb⋅ft) at 1,800–4,600
SLC 200	2015–2020	1,991 cc (121 cu in) I4 turbo (M274 DE20 LA)	184 PS (135 kW; 181 hp) at 5,250	300 N⋅m (221 lb⋅ft) at 1,200–4,000
SLK 250 BlueEFFICIENCY	2011–2015	1,796 cc (110 cu in) I4 turbo (M271 DE18 LA)	204 PS (150 kW; 201 hp) at 5,500	310 N⋅m (229 lb⋅ft) at 2,000–4,300
SLC 260	2017–2020	1,991 cc (121 cu in) I4 turbo (M274 DE 20 LA)	211 PS (155 kW; 208 hp) at 5,500	350 N⋅m (258 lb⋅ft) at 1,200-4,000
SLC 300	2015–2020	1,991 cc (121 cu in) I4 turbo (M274 DE 20 LA)	245 PS (180 kW; 242 hp) at 5,500	370 N⋅m (273 lb⋅ft) at 1,300–4,000
SLK 350 BlueEFFICIENCY	2011–2015	3,498 cc (213 cu in) V6 (M276 DE35)	306 PS (225 kW; 302 hp) at 6,500	370 N⋅m (273 lb⋅ft) at 3,500–5,250
SLK 55 AMG	2012–2015	5,461 cc (333 cu in) V8 (M152 DE55)	422 PS (310 kW; 416 hp) at 6,800	540 N⋅m (398 lb⋅ft) at 4,500
AMG SLC 43	2015–2020	2,996 cc (183 cu in) V6 twin-turbo (M276 DE30)	367–390 PS (270–287 kW; 362–385 hp) at 6,000	540 N⋅m (398 lb⋅ft) at 1,600–4,000

Diesel engines
Model	Years	Type	Power at rpm	Torque at rpm
SLK 250 CDI BlueEFFICIENCY	2012–2020	2,143 cc (131 cu in) 16V I4 2-stage turbo (OM651 DE22 LA)	204 PS (150 kW; 201 hp) at 4,200	500 N⋅m (369 lb⋅ft) at 1,600–1,800

ECO start/stop is included for all engine models.

=== Transmissions ===
Petrol engines
Model	Years	Types
SLK 200 BlueEFFICIENCY	2011–2015	6-speed manual, 7-speed automatic (7G-TRONIC PLUS)
SLK 200	2015–	6-speed manual, 9-speed automatic (9G-TRONIC)
SLK 250 BlueEFFICIENCY	2011–	6-speed manual, 7-speed automatic (7G-TRONIC PLUS)
SLK 350 BlueEFFICIENCY	2011–	7-speed automatic (7G-TRONIC PLUS)
SLK 55 AMG	2012–	7-speed automatic (AMG SPEEDSHIFT PLUS)

Diesel engines
Model	Years	Types
SLK 250 CDI BlueEFFICIENCY	2012–	6-speed manual, 7-speed automatic (7G-TRONIC PLUS)

=== Performance ===
Model	Years	0–100 km/h (62 mph) acceleration (seconds)	Top speed	Emissions CO_{2}
SLK 200	2011–	7.3	239 km/h (149 mph)	158 g/km
SLK 250 CDI automatic	2011–	6.7	243 km/h (151 mph)	132 g/km
SLK 250 automatic	2011–	6.6	243 km/h (151 mph)	153 g/km
SLK 350 automatic	2011–	5.6	249 km/h (155 mph) (electronically limited)	167 g/km
SLK 55 AMG automatic	2012–	4.6	280 km/h (170 mph) (electronically limited)	195 g/km

==== Facelift (SLC-Class) ====
In December 2015 Mercedes presented to the press the new version named SLC-Class, announcing a March 2016 launch date to coincide with the 20th anniversary of the original SLK. The SLC nameplate is revised from the C107.

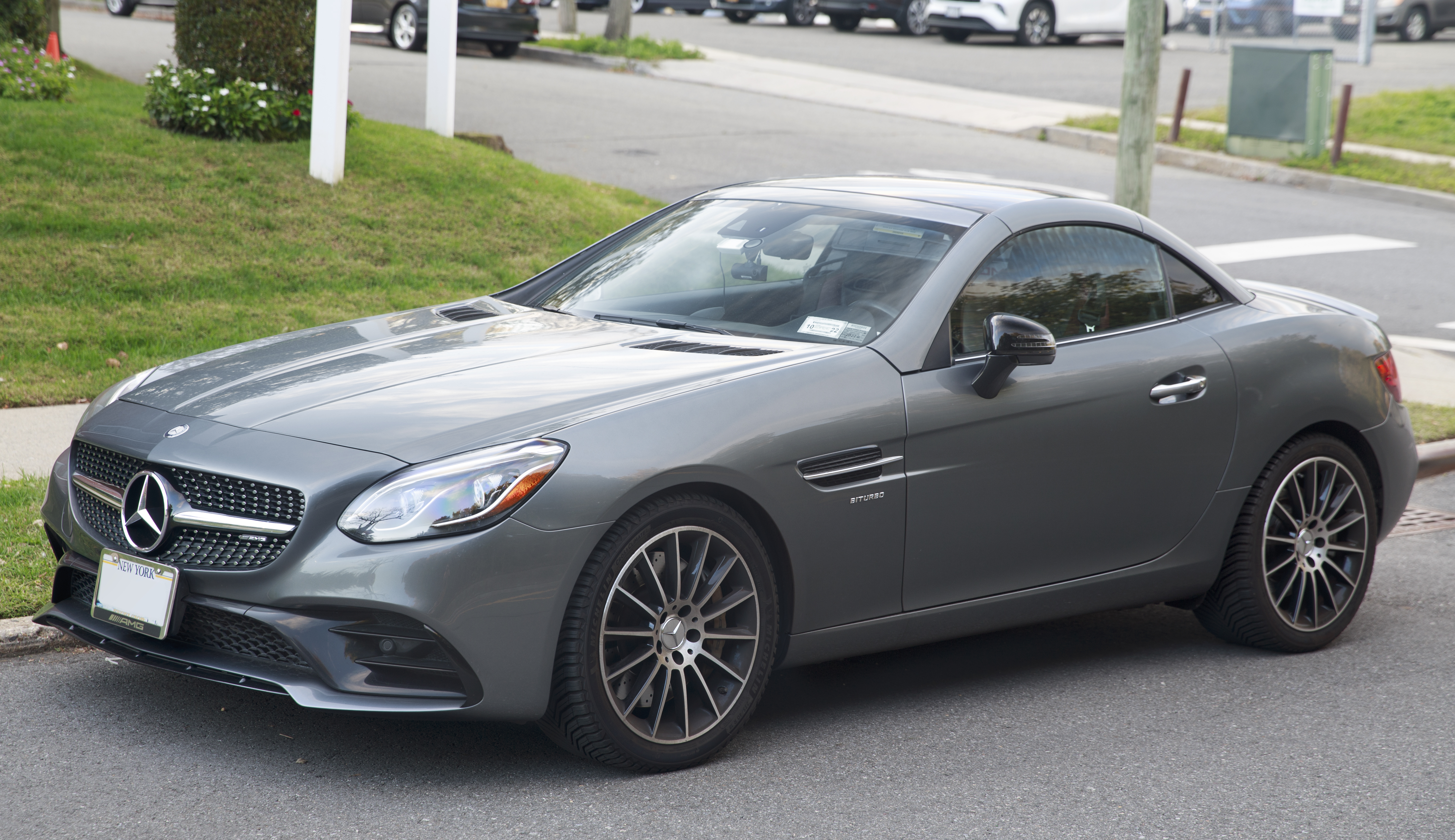
Mercedes-Benz AMG SLC 43

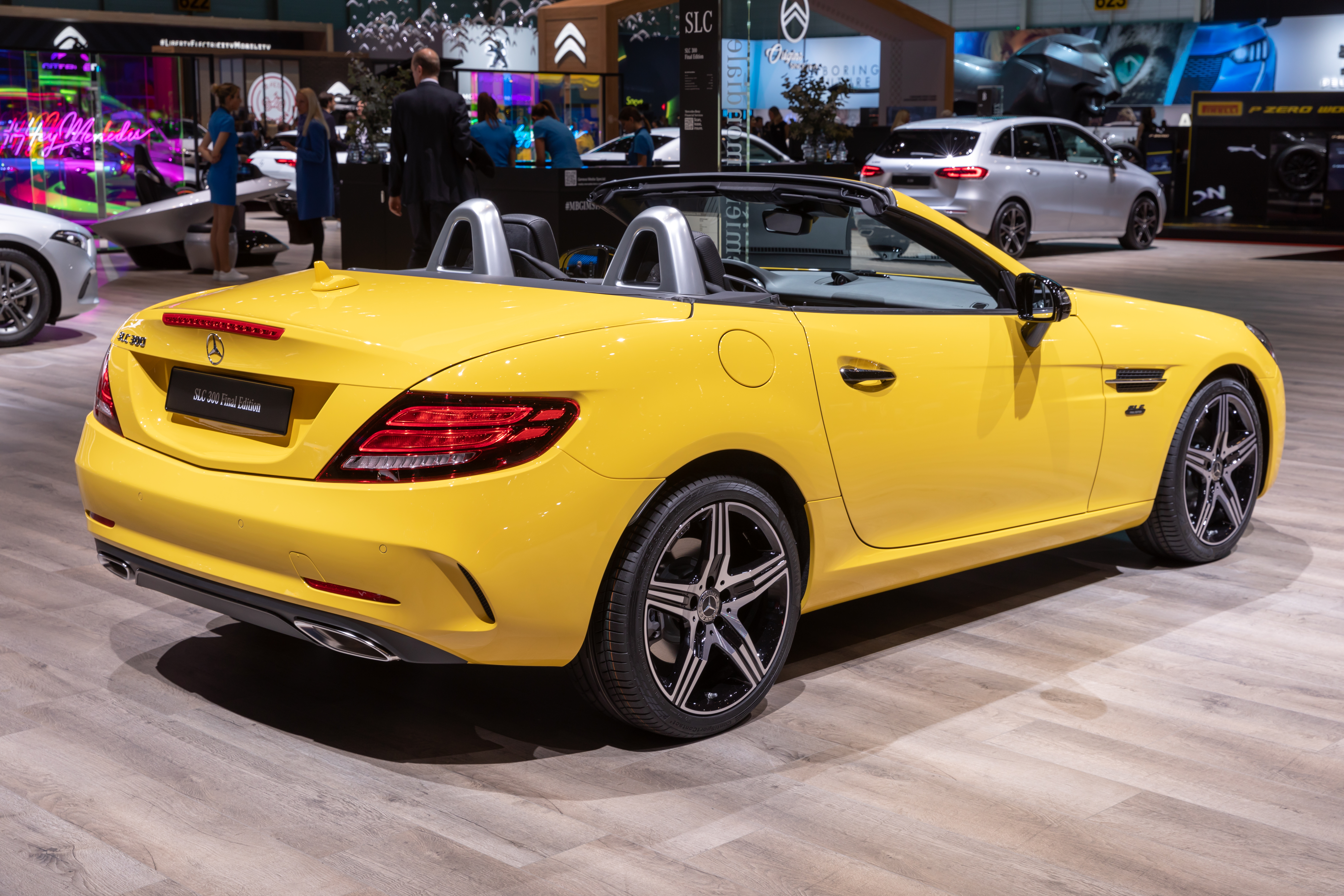
SLC 300 Final Edition

- SLC 180 4 cylinders, 1.6L turbo, 156 PS, 250 Nm, 5.6 L/100 km, 127 g CO_{2}/km, 0–100 km/h (62 mph) in 7.9 s, 226 km/h (140 mph)
- SLC 200 4 cylinders, 2.0L turbo, 184 PS, 300 Nm, 5.7 L/100 km, 133 g/km, 0–100 km/h (62 mph) in 7.0s, 240 km/h (149 mph)
- SLC 300 4 cylinders, 2.0L turbo, 245 PS, 370 Nm, 5.8 L/100 km, 134 g/km, 0–100 km/h (62 mph) in 5.8s, 250 km/h (155 mph)
- AMG SLC 43 V6, 3.0L biturbo, 367 - 390 PS, 520 Nm, 7.8 L/100 km, 178 g/km, 0–100 km/h (62 mph) in 4.7s, 250 km/h (155 mph)
- SLC 250 d 4 cylinders, 2.1L turbodiesel 204 PS, 4.4 L/100 km, 114 g/km, 0–100 km/h (62 mph) in 6.6s, 245 km/h (152 mph)

All versions have as standard the 9G-Tronic automatic gearbox, except for the 180 and 200 in which a manual 6-speed gearbox is standard, although the automatic is available as an option.
