= Mercedes-Benz M271 engine =

Mercedes-Benz M271
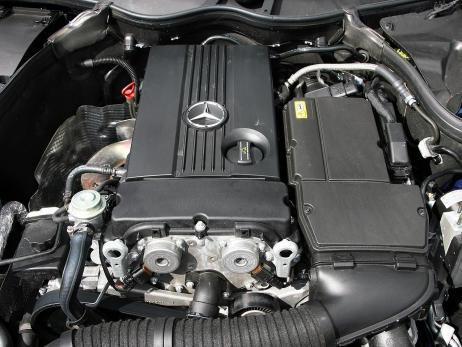

Overview
- Manufacturer: Mercedes-Benz
- Production: 2002–2015

Layout
- Configuration: Straight-4
- Displacement: 1.6 L (1,597 cc); 1.8 L (1,796 cc)
- Cylinder bore: 82 mm (3.23 in)
- Piston stroke: 75.6 mm (2.98 in); 85 mm (3.35 in)
- Cylinder block material: Cast aluminium
- Cylinder head material: Aluminium
- Valvetrain: DOHC 4 valves x cyl. and VVT

Combustion
- Supercharger: In some versions and intercooled
- Turbocharger: In DE18LA (M271Evo, 271.8XX)
- Fuel system: Sequential fuel injection Direct injection
- Fuel type: Gasoline
- Cooling system: Water cooled

Output
- Power output: 122–204 PS (90–150 kW; 120–201 hp)

Chronology
- Predecessor: Mercedes-Benz M111 engine
- Successor: Mercedes-Benz M274 engine

The Mercedes-Benz M271 engine is a straight-4 automobile piston engine family used in the 2000s (decade).

All M271 engines are built in Untertürkheim, Germany. The family has a cast aluminium engine block and aluminium DOHC cylinder heads with 4 valves per cylinder and variable valve timing and a coil-on-plug ignition system.

== KE18 ML (271.9XX) ==
The KE18 ML is a 1.8 L (1,796 cc) version. Bore and stroke is 82 mm × 85 mm (3.23 in × 3.35 in). Output ranges from 122 PS (90 kW; 120 hp) at 5200 rpm to 194 PS (143 kW; 191 hp) at 5800 rpm.

It uses sequential fuel injection, is supercharged and intercooled, and features fracture-split forged steel connecting rods. A version running on natural gas was introduced in the German market in 2002.

Applications:

- 2002 CLK 200 Kompressor (W209)
- 2002 C 180 Kompressor, C 200 Kompressor, C 230 Kompressor (W203)
- 2002 C 180 Kompressor SportCoupé, C 200 Kompressor SportCoupé (CL203)
- 2004–2006 C 160 SportCoupé (CL203)
- 2002 E 200 Kompressor (W211)
- 2004 E 200 NGT (bi-fuel - gasoline + natural gas) (W211)
- 2004 SLK 200 Kompressor (R171)
- 2007 C 180 Kompressor, C 200 Kompressor (W204)
- 2008 CLC 180 Kompressor, CLC 200 Kompressor (CL203)

== DE18 ML (271.942) ==
This engine had the same dimensions as E18 ML and almost the same features including a supercharger, but used CGI (Stratified Charged Gasoline Injection) gasoline direct injection. It has been produced since 2003 in only one version, with an output of 170 PS (125 kW; 168 hp) at 5300 rpm. The production ceased in 2005.

Applications:

- 2003 C 200 CGI SportCoupé (CL203)
- 2003 C 200 CGI (W203)
- 2003 CLK 200 CGI (C209)

== KE16 ML (271.910) ==
The KE16 ML is a 1.6 L (1,597 cc) version introduced in 2008. Bore and stroke is 82 mm × 75.6 mm (3.23 in × 2.98 in). It shares the same features with the KE18ML version, like supercharger and multi-point fuel injection. Output ranges from 129 PS (95 kW; 127 hp) at 5000 rpm to 156 PS (115 kW; 154 hp) at 5200 rpm.

Applications:

- 2008 CLC 160 BlueEFFICIENCY (CL203)
- 2008 C 180 Kompressor (W204)

== DE18 LA (M271Evo, 271.8XX) ==
This is the last version of M271 engine family. Dimensions are the same as E18 ML and DE18 ML, but the supercharger has been replaced with a turbocharger; like the DE18 ML it uses the CGI (Stratified Charged Gasoline Injection) gasoline direct injection. Output ranges from 156 PS (115 kW; 154 hp) at 5200 rpm to 204 PS (150 kW; 201 hp) at 5500 rpm.

Applications:

- 2009–2013 C 180 CGI, C 200 CGI, C 250 CGI (W204)
- 2009–2013 E 200 CGI, E 250 CGI (W212)
- 2010–2013 E 200 CGI (C207)
- 2009–2013 E 250 CGI (C207)
- 2011–2015 SLK 200, SLK 250 (R172)

== Other uses ==
The engine in 2.0-litre naturally aspirated form is used by German automotive company HWA Team as the basis for a Mercedes-Benz motor racing engine and has been the engine used widely in Formula 3 motor racing powering championship winning drivers across Europe and further afield.

== See also ==
- List of Mercedes-Benz engines
