= Mercedes-Benz M152 engine =

Mercedes-Benz M152

Overview
- Manufacturer: Mercedes-Benz
- Production: 2012–2015

Layout
- Configuration: 90° V8
- Displacement: 5.5 L (5,461 cc)
- Cylinder bore: 98 mm (3.86 in)
- Piston stroke: 90.5 mm (3.56 in)
- Cylinder block material: Aluminium alloy
- Cylinder head material: Aluminium alloy
- Valvetrain: DOHC 4 valves x cyl.
- Compression ratio: 12.6:1

Combustion
- Fuel system: Direct injection
- Fuel type: Gasoline
- Cooling system: Water cooled

Output
- Power output: 310 kW (421 PS; 416 hp)
- Specific power: 56.8 kW (77.2 PS; 76.2 hp) per litre
- Torque output: 540 N⋅m (398 lb⋅ft)

Chronology
- Predecessor: Mercedes-Benz M113 engine
- Successor: Mercedes-Benz M176/M177/M178 engine

The M152 is a V8 engine produced by Mercedes-Benz from 2012 to 2015.

== Design ==
The M152 is essentially a naturally aspirated variant of the M157 engine but has been revised by AMG. It has the same bore and a stroke of 98 mm × 90.5 mm (3.86 in × 3.56 in) as the M157 but with a higher 12.6:1 compression ratio. Compared to its predecessor, the M152 features new cylinder heads, intake manifold, and lubrication system. It also now has direct injection, and Cylinder deactivation.

== Models ==
| Engine | Power | Torque | Years |
|---|---|---|---|
| M152 DE55 | 310.5 kW (422 PS; 416 hp) at 6,800 rpm | 540 N⋅m (398 lb⋅ft) at 4,500 rpm | 2012–2015 |

=== M152 DE55 ===
- 2012–2015 SLK 55 AMG (R172)
