= Mercedes-Benz E-Class (C207) =

Fourth generation of Mercedes-Benz E-Class

Mercedes-Benz E-Class (C207/A207)
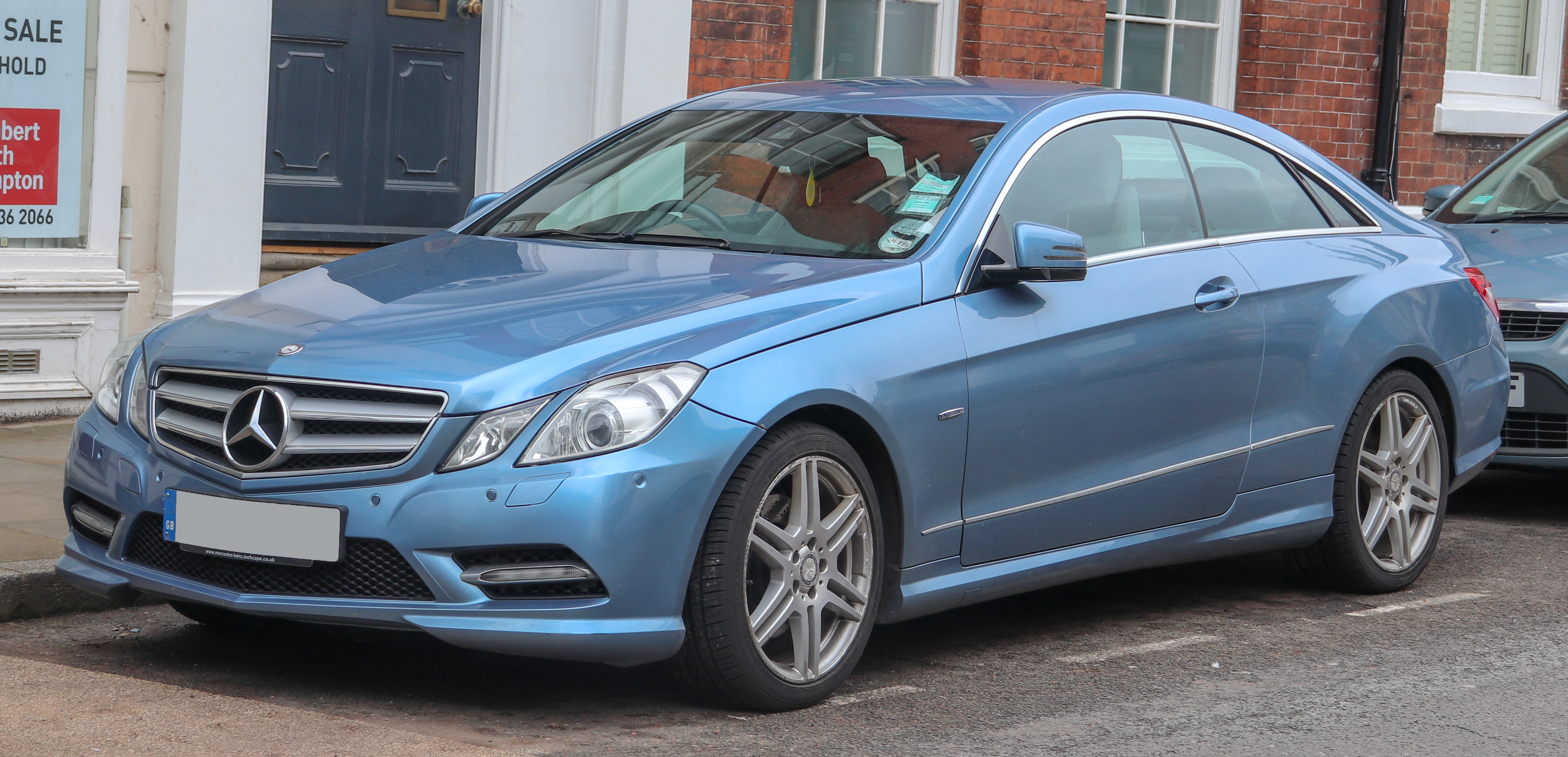

Overview
- Manufacturer: Daimler AG
- Production: June 2009 – 2017 (coupé); March 2009 – 2017 (convertible)
- Assembly: Germany: Bremen

Body and chassis
- Class: Grand tourer (S)
- Body style: 2-door coupé; 2-door convertible
- Layout: Front-engine, rear-wheel drive; Front-engine, all-wheel drive (4matic)
- Related: Mercedes-Benz C-Class (W204); Mercedes-Benz E-Class (W212)

Powertrain
- Engine: Petrol: 1.8 L M271 turbo I4; 2.0 L M274 turbo I4; 3.0 L M276 twin-turbo V6; 3.5 L M276 V6; 3.5 L M272 V6; 4.7 L M278 twin-turbo V8; 5.5 L M273 V8; Diesel: 2.1 L OM651 twin-turbo I4; 3.0 L OM642 turbo V6
- Transmission: 6-speed manual; 5-speed 5G-Tronic automatic; 7-speed 7G-Tronic automatic; 9-speed 9G-Tronic automatic

Dimensions
- Wheelbase: 2,760 mm (108.7 in)
- Length: 4,698–4,717 mm (185.0–185.7 in)
- Width: 1,786 mm (70.3 in)
- Height: 1,390–1,413 mm (54.7–55.6 in)
- Curb weight: 1,560–1,990 kg (3,439–4,387 lb)

Chronology
- Predecessor: Mercedes-Benz CLK-Class (C209/A209)
- Successor: Mercedes-Benz E-Class (C238/A238)

The C207/A207 Mercedes-Benz E-Class are coupé and convertible models based on the Mercedes-Benz E-Class (W212) sedan chassis. It was produced between 2009 and 2017 as the successor to the previous C209/A209 CLK-Class. The body styles of the range are 2-door coupé (C207) and 2-door convertible (A207).

The coupé and cabriolet vehicles were never offered in the high-performance Mercedes-AMG variants, unlike its predecessor. E350 and E400 coupé models were also available in all-wheel drive 4MATIC variants from 2012.

It was replaced by the C238/A238 E-Class in 2017 for the 2018 model year.

== Development and launch ==
The C207/A207 E-Class shares its platform with the W204 C-Class sedan, featuring identical wheelbases, and similar axle track lengths. While the W212 E-Class sedan is built at the Sindelfingen plant, the E-Class C207 coupé is built in Bremen alongside the W204 C-Class.

Some early petrol models had CGI BlueEFFICIENCY branding, with the exception of the E 300 BlueEFFICIENCY and E 500. With the introduction of the Mercedes 7G-Tronic automatic transmission, models subsequently dropped the CGI moniker, along with the BlueEFFICIENCY name after the 2013 facelift. Diesel models with the nine-speed automatic transmission were also called BlueTEC instead of CDI BlueEFFICIENCY, and facelifted models were simply called CDI or BlueTEC.

Mercedes-Benz originally intended for the C207/A207 to continue the CLK name, but changed to E-Class branding during development.

== Body styles ==
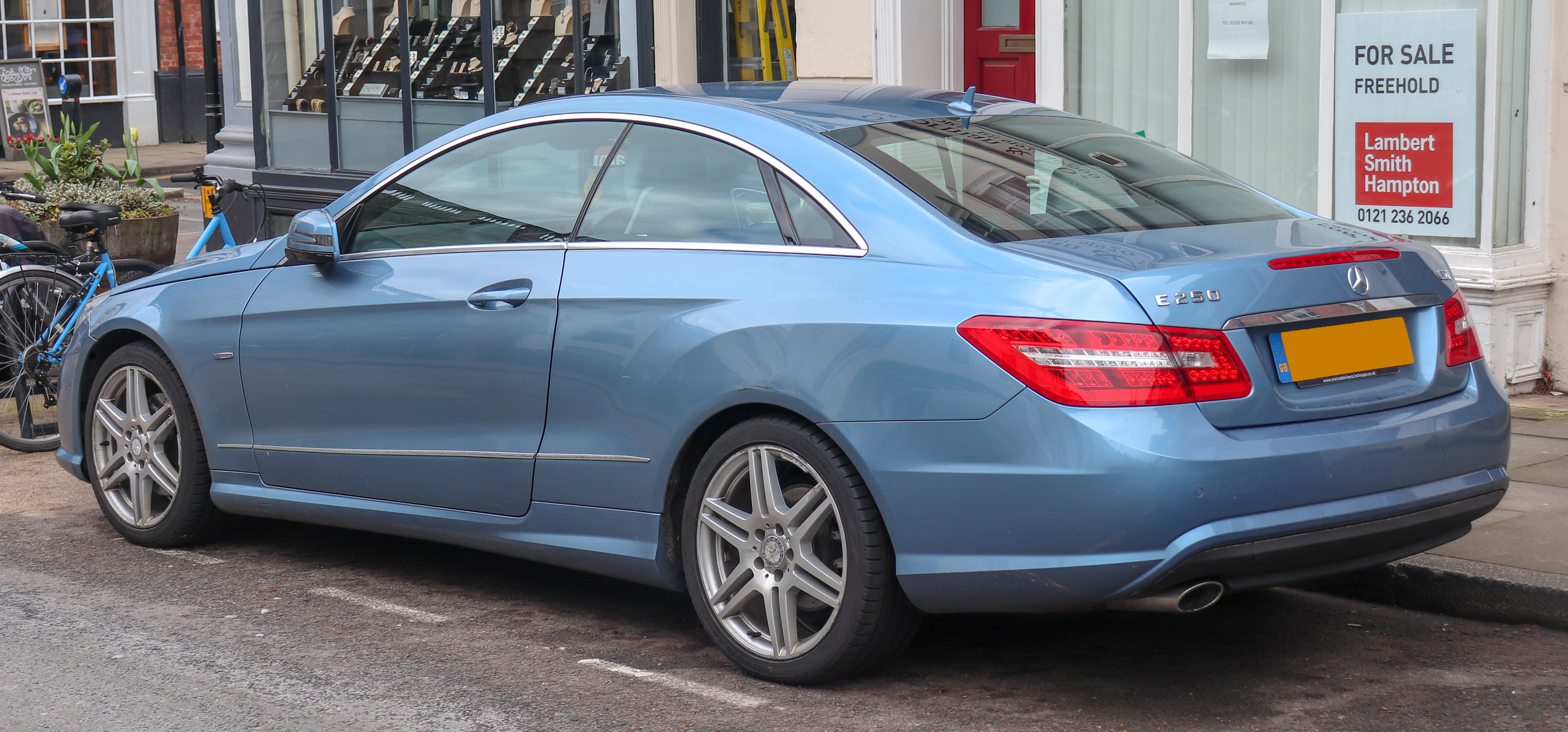
C207 coupé

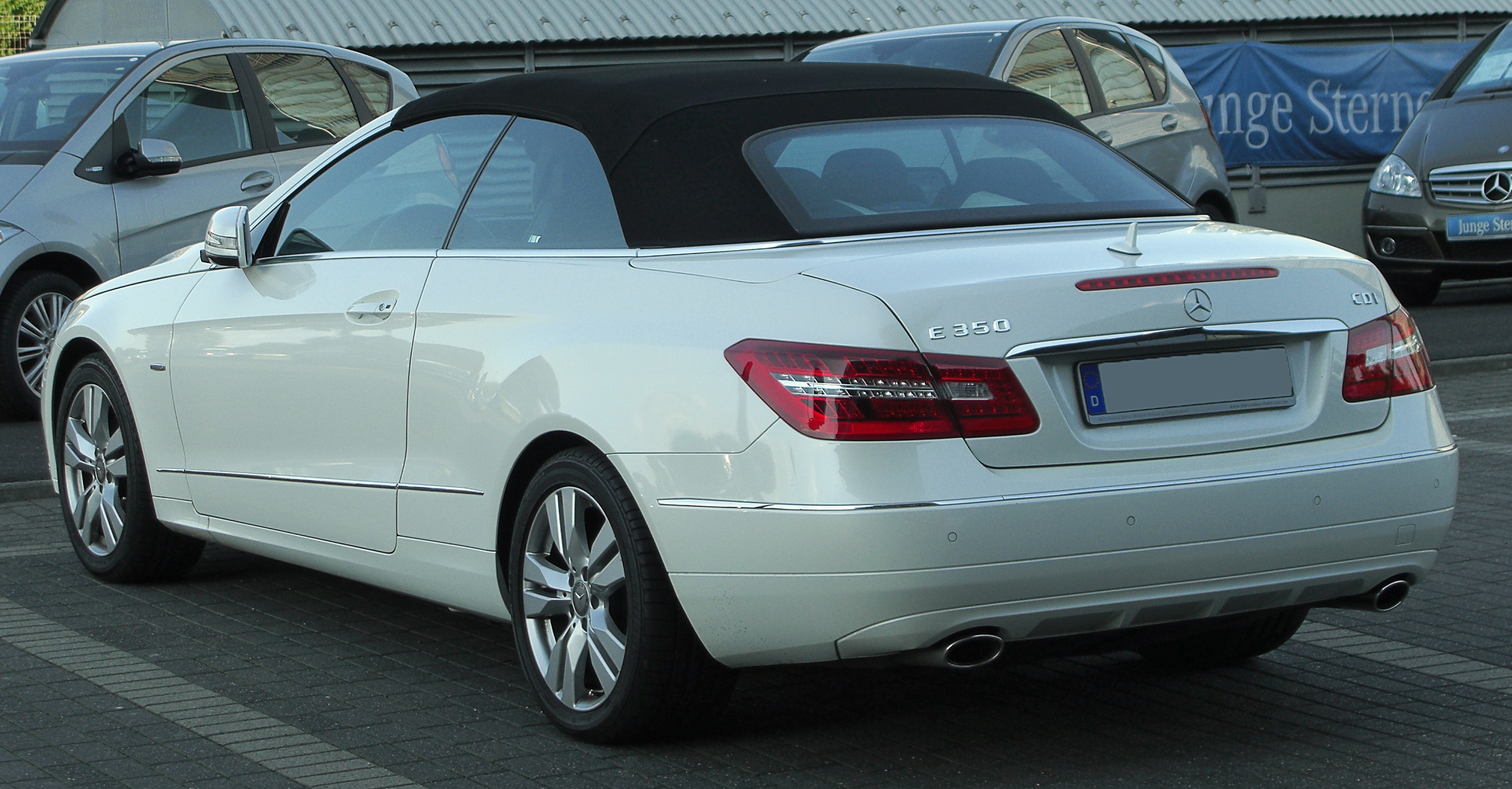
A207 convertible

=== Coupé (C207) ===
The coupé was introduced at the 2009 Geneva Motor Show.

Like the CLK it replaced, the C207 Coupé features a pillarless design with no B pillar between the front and back windows.

=== Convertible (A207) ===
The convertible was unveiled at the 2010 North American International Auto Show.

Some convertibles have Mercedes' AIRSCARF system, which provides neck heating for front occupants, and the AIRCAP windshield spoiler and wind deflector system, deflecting air over the cabin for reduced draft and wind noise.

== Equipment ==
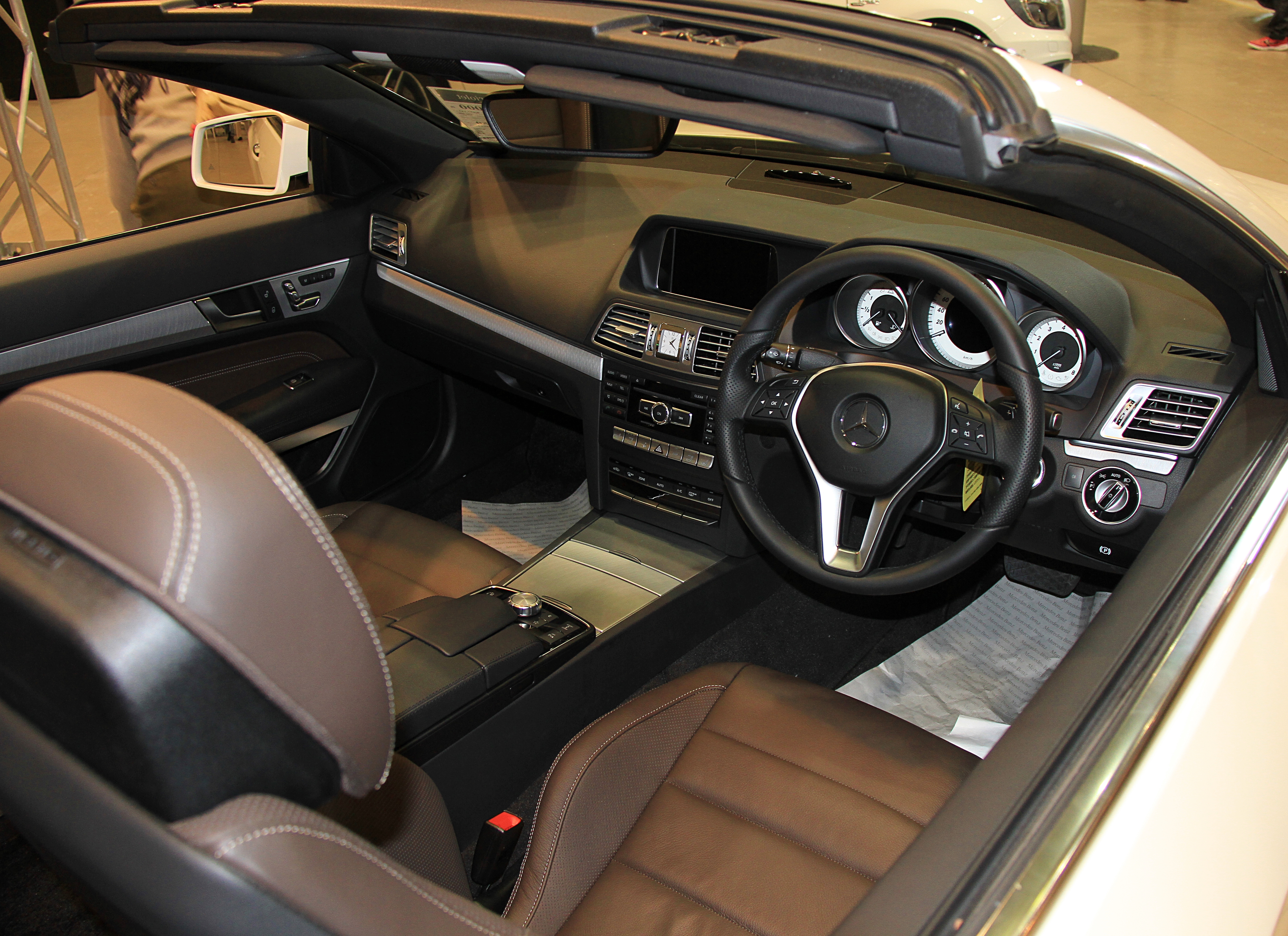
Interior (facelift model)

Standard equipment includes Mercedes' AGILITY CONTROL semi-adaptive suspension and ATTENTION ASSIST which alerts the driver when the car detects driver fatigue. Models feature front, side, and knee airbags, along with belt tensioners and head restraints. An AMG Sports package can also be optioned, featuring AMG bodystyling, 15 mm (0.6 in) lower suspension, silver painted front brake calipers, and wider 18-inch alloy wheels. However, the AMG package did not include performance upgrades.

== Models ==
=== Petrol engines ===
Model	Years	Engine	Power	Torque	0–100 km/h (0–62 mph)
E 200 CGI; BlueEFFICIENCY	2010–2013	M271 DE18; 1.8 L I4 turbo	135 kW (184 PS; 181 hp) at 5,250 rpm	270 N⋅m (199 lbf⋅ft) at 1,800–4,600 rpm	8.3 s
E 200 CGI; BlueEFFICIENCY	2013–2017	M274 DE20; 2.0 L I4 turbo	135 kW (184 PS; 181 hp) at 5,550 rpm	300 N⋅m (221 lbf⋅ft) at 1,200–4,000 rpm	7.8 s
E 250 CGI; BlueEFFICIENCY	2009–2011	M271 DE18; 1.8 L I4 turbo	150 kW (204 PS; 201 hp) at 5,500 rpm	310 N⋅m (229 lbf⋅ft) at 2,000–4,300 rpm	7.4 s
E 250 CGI; BlueEFFICIENCY	2013–2017	M274 DE20; 2.0 L I4 turbo	155 kW (211 PS; 208 hp) at 5,500 rpm	350 N⋅m (258 lbf⋅ft) at 1,200–4,000 rpm	7.1 s
E 300; BlueEFFICIENCY	2011–2017	M276 DE35; 3.5 L V6	185 kW (252 PS; 248 hp) at 6,500 rpm	340 N⋅m (251 lbf⋅ft) at 3,500–4,500 rpm	6.9 s
E 350 CGI; BlueEFFICIENCY	2009–2011	M272 DE35; 3.5 L V6	215 kW (292 PS; 288 hp) at 6,400 rpm	365 N⋅m (269 lb⋅ft) at 3,000–5,100 rpm	6.5 s
E 350 CGI; BlueEFFICIENCY	2011–2017	M276 DE35; 3.5 L V6	225 kW (306 PS; 302 hp) at 6,500 rpm	370 N⋅m (273 lbf⋅ft) at 3,500–5,250 rpm	6.4 s
E 400	2013–2015	M276 E30; 3.0 L V6 twin-turbo	245 kW (333 PS; 329 hp) at 5,500 rpm	480 N⋅m (354 lbf⋅ft) at 1,400–4,000 rpm	5.3 s
E 400	2015-2017	M276 DE 35 LA 3.5 L V6 twin-turbo	245 kW (333 PS; 329 hp) at 5,250 rpm	480 N⋅m (354 lbf⋅ft) at 1,200–4,000 rpm	5.3 s
E 500 (E 550 / US and Canada)	2009–2011	M273 E55; 5.5 L V8	285 kW (387 PS; 382 hp) at 6,000 rpm	530 N⋅m (391 lbf⋅ft) at 2,800–4,800 rpm	5.2 s
E 500 (E 550 / US and Canada)	2011–2017	M278 DE46; 4.7 L V8 twin-turbo	300 kW (408 PS; 402 hp) at 5,000–5,750 rpm	600 N⋅m (443 lbf⋅ft) at 1,600–4,750 rpm	4.1 s

=== Diesel engines ===
Model	Years	Engine	Power	Torque	0–100 km/h (0–62 mph)
E 220 CDI; BlueEFFICIENCY	2010–2011	OM651 DE22; 2.1 L I4 twin-turbo	125 kW (168 hp) at 3,000–4,200 rpm	400 N⋅m (295 lbf⋅ft) at 1,400–2,800 rpm	8.5 s
E 220 CDI; BlueEFFICIENCY	2011–2017	OM651 DE22; 2.1 L I4 twin-turbo	125 kW (168 hp) at 3,000–4,200 rpm	400 N⋅m (295 lbf⋅ft) at 1,400–2,800 rpm	8.3 s
E 250 CDI; BlueEFFICIENCY	2009–2017	OM651 DE22; 2.1 L I4 twin-turbo	150 kW (201 hp) at 4,200 rpm	500 N⋅m (369 lbf⋅ft) at 1,600–1,800 rpm	7.4 s
E 350 CDI; BlueEFFICIENCY	2009–2011	OM642 DE30; 3.0L V6 turbo	170 kW (228 hp) at 3,800 rpm	540 N⋅m (398 lbf⋅ft) at 1,600–2,400 rpm	6.7 s
E 350 CDI; BlueEFFICIENCY	2011–2017	OM642 DE30; 3.0L V6 turbo	195 kW (261 hp) at 3,800 rpm	620 N⋅m (457 lbf⋅ft) at 1,600–2,400 rpm	6.4 s

== 2013 facelift ==
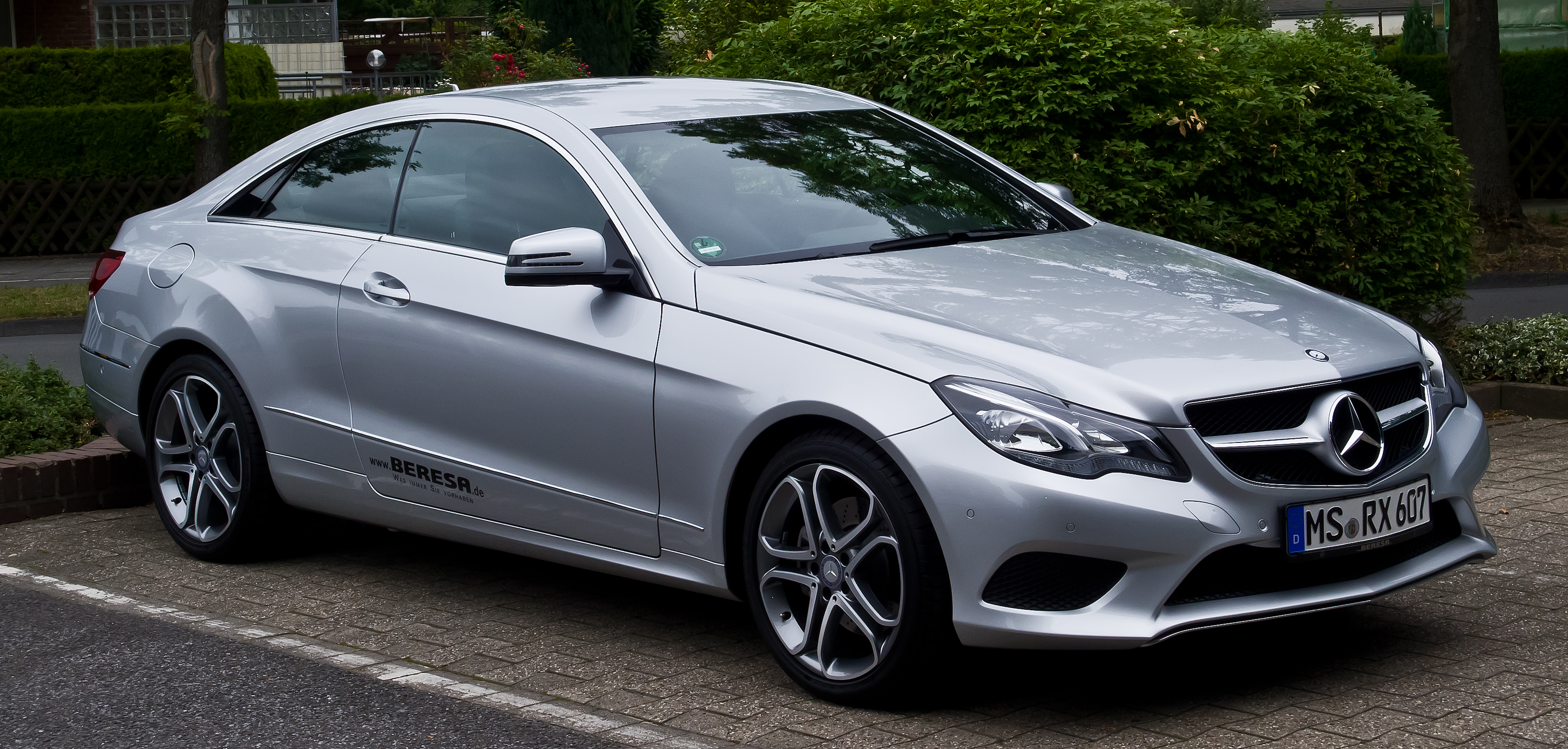
Facelift E 200 coupé

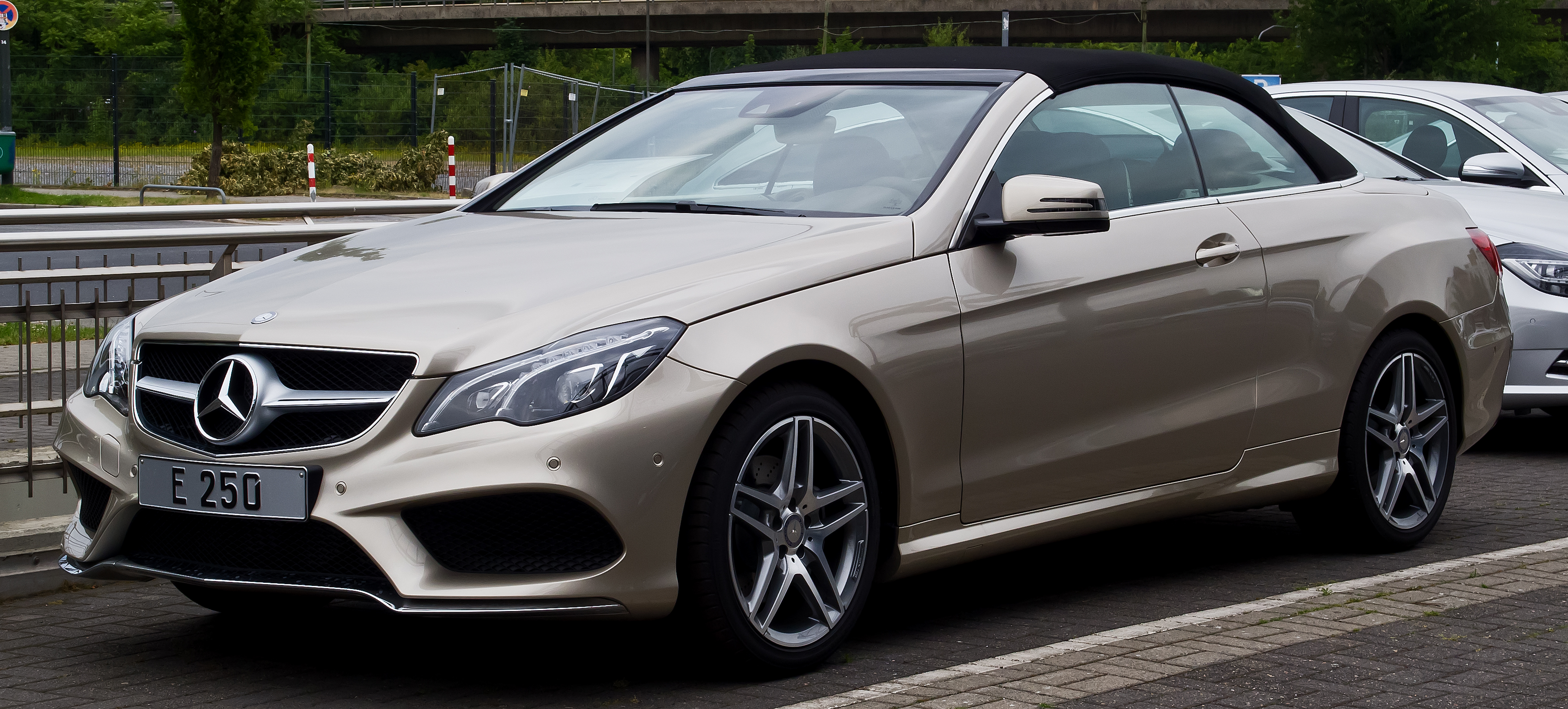

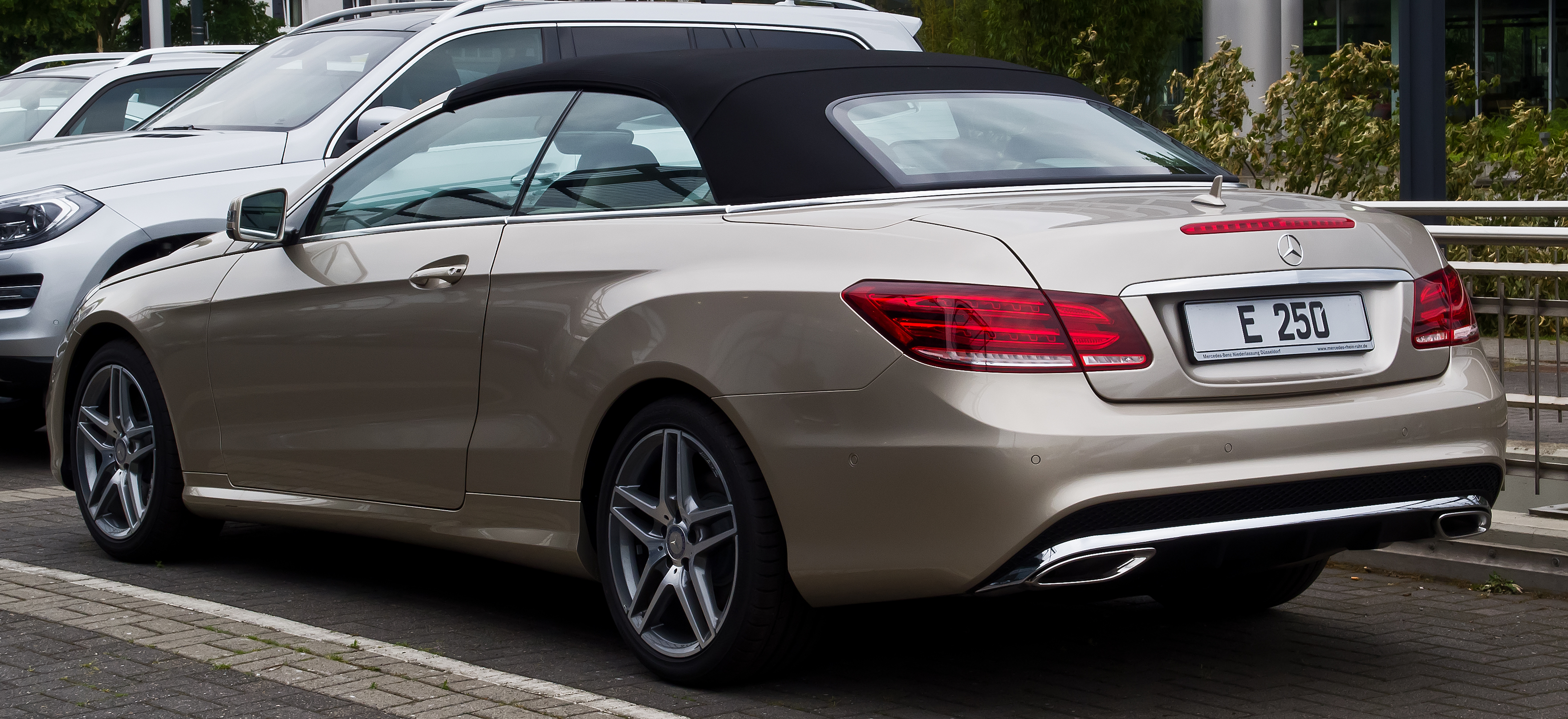
Facelift E 250 convertible with the AMG Sport package

The mid-life cycle update for the C207/A207 E-Class was introduced at the North American International Auto Show in 2013:

- Exterior changes include: redesigned LED headlights and taillights, and revised front and rear bumpers
- Interior changes include: restyled instrument cluster and center console switch layout, redesigned steering wheel, and gear selector location moved to steering wheel column
- Introduction of E 400 model, and updated engines in E 200 and E 250 models
- Mercedes COLLISION PREVENTION ASSIST, ATTENTION ASSIST, and stop-start engine system now standard on models
- 9G-Tronic automatic transmission introduced on diesel models

== Awards ==
- 2009 Auto Bild Design Award: Germany's most beautiful coupé
- 2010 Auto motor und sport "Autonis Design Award" for the convertible
