= Mercedes-Benz E-Class (W210) =

Second generation of Mercedes-Benz E-Class

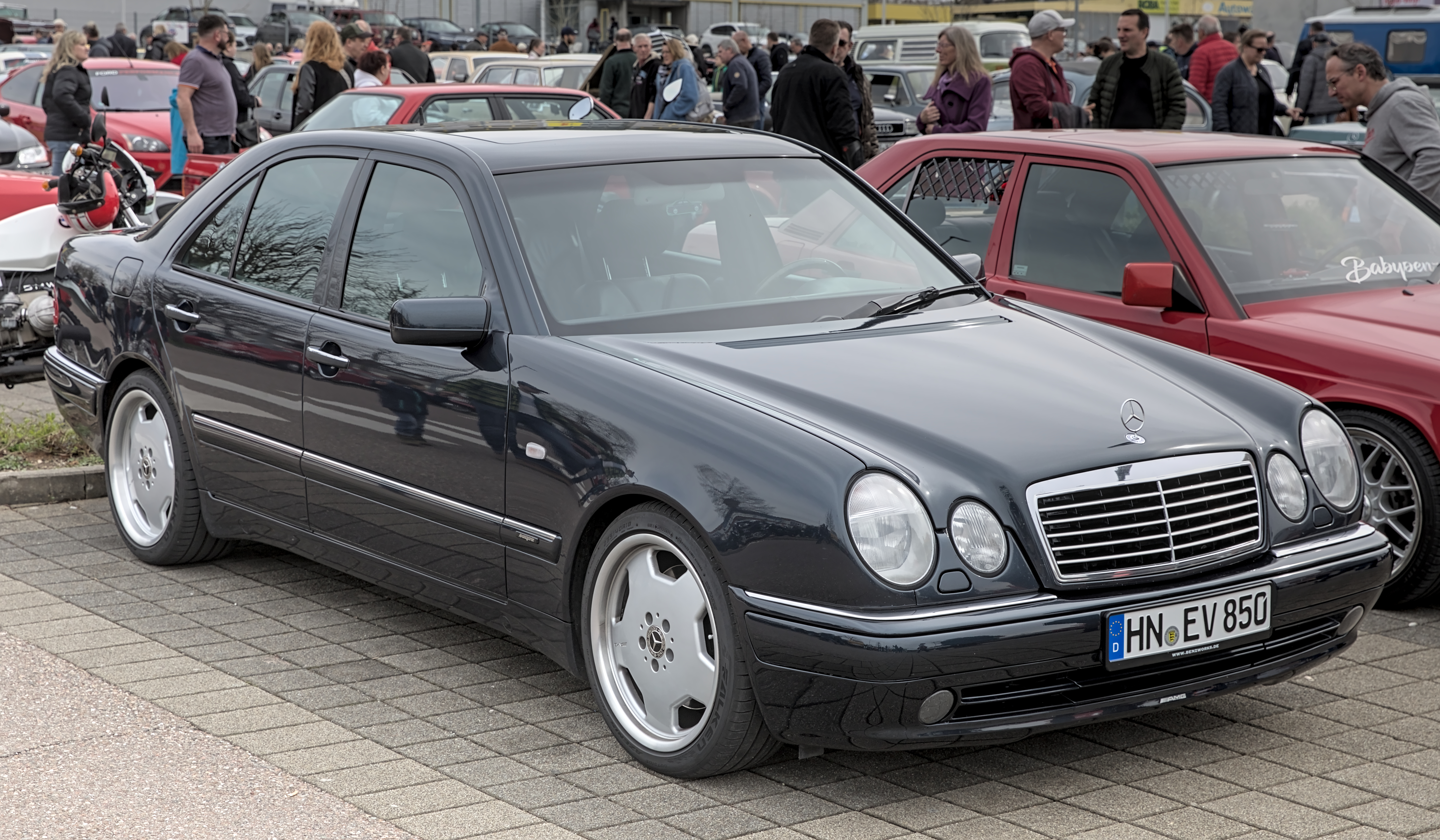

Overview
- Manufacturer: Daimler-Benz (1994–1998); DaimlerChrysler (1998–2003); Magna Steyr (4MATIC models only)
- Model code: W 210 (saloon); S 210 (estate); VF 210 (chassis); V 210 (long-wheelbase limousine)
- Production: June 1994 – March 2003 (saloon); May 1995 – December 2002 (estate)
- Model years: 1996–2002
- Assembly: Germany: Sindelfingen; Germany: Rastatt (saloon, until October 1996); Austria: Graz (4MATIC models); Egypt: 6th of October City (EGA); India: Pune (TELCO); Mexico: Santiago Tianguistenco
- Designer: Steve Mattin; Bruno Sacco

Body and chassis
- Class: Executive car (E)
- Body style: 4-door saloon (W 210); 5-door estate (S 210); chassis for specialist bodywork (VF 210); long-wheelbase limousine (V 210)
- Related: Mercedes-Benz CLK-Class (C208)

Powertrain
- Engine: Petrol I4: 2.0 L M111; 2.0 L M111 supercharger; 2.3 L M111; I6: 2.8 L M104; 3.2 L M104; 3.6 L M104; V6: 2.4 L M112; 2.6 L M112; 2.8 L M112; 3.2 L M112; V8: 4.2 L M119; 4.3 L M113; 5.0 L M119; 5.4 L M113; 6.0 L M119; 6.3 L M119; Diesel I4: 2.0 L OM604; 2.2 L OM604; 2.2 L OM611 CDI; I5: 2.5 L OM605; 2.5 L OM605 turbo; 2.7 L OM612 CDI; 2.9 L OM602 turbo; I6: 3.0 L OM606; 3.0 L OM606 turbo; 3.2 L OM613 CDI
- Transmission: 4-speed 4G-Tronic automatic 5-speed 4G-Tronic 722.5 automatic 5-speed 5G-Tronic automatic 5-speed manual 6-speed manual

Dimensions
- Wheelbase: 2,833 mm (111.5 in)
- Length: 4,795–4,839 mm (188.8–190.5 in)
- Width: 1,799 mm (70.8 in)
- Height: 1,411–1,509 mm (55.6–59.4 in)
- Curb weight: 1,440–1,860 kg (3,175–4,101 lb); 2,710 kg (5,975 lb) (B6 armoured saloon)

Chronology
- Predecessor: Mercedes-Benz W124
- Successor: Mercedes-Benz W211

The Mercedes-Benz E-Class (W210) is the second generation of the Mercedes-Benz E-Class, produced by Mercedes-Benz and marketed in saloon and estate body styles. Production ran from June 1994 to March 2003 for the saloon and from May 1995 to December 2002 for the estate; market introduction followed in 1995 for the saloon and 1996 for the estate. The saloon was internally designated W 210, while the estate was designated S 210. The model replaced the Mercedes-Benz W124 and was succeeded by the Mercedes-Benz W211.

The W210 was introduced in May 1995. Compared with the W124, it used a more rounded body and a front end with four elliptical headlamp lenses, a design commonly known as the “four-eye” face. The estate, marketed by Mercedes-Benz as the T-Modell, followed in June 1996. The saloon was replaced by the W211 in March 2002, and the estate was replaced in December 2002. Total W210 production was 1,653,437 vehicles from Sindelfingen, Rastatt and Graz.

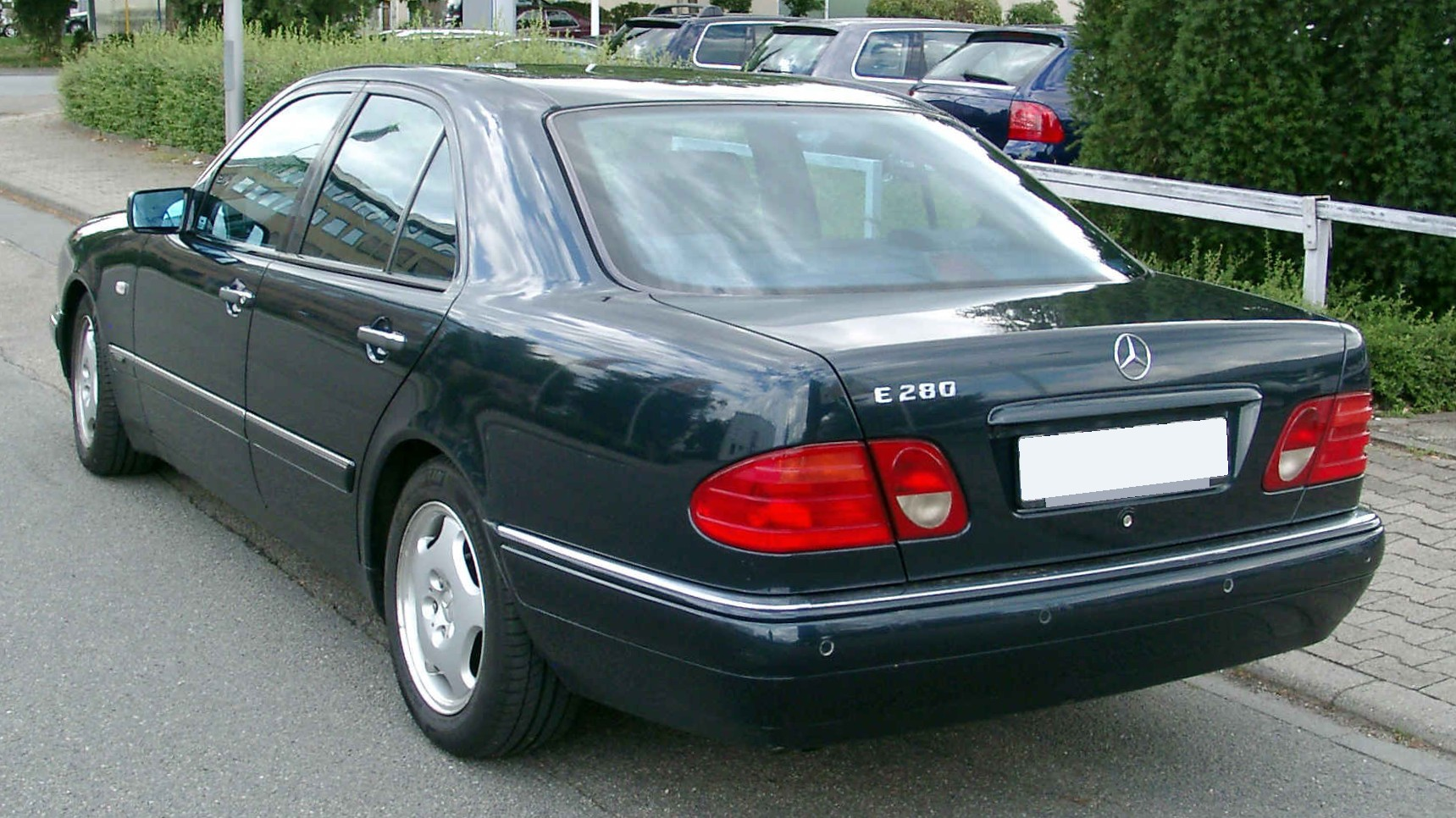
Rear view

== Model history ==
=== General ===
W210 development began in 1988, three years after the W124's introduction. The design was created by Steve Mattin under design chief Bruno Sacco between 1988 and 1991, and was previewed by the 1993 Coupé Concept shown at the Geneva Motor Show in March 1993. Design patents for the Coupé Concept and W210 E-Class were filed on 25 February 1993 in Germany and 25 August 1993 in the United States.

The body design received a Red Dot Design Award and achieved a drag coefficient of C_{d} 0.27. Mercedes-Benz used water-based paint on the model.

The W210 adopted the design and equipment-line concept already used in the C-Class. The base equipment line was Classic, with Elegance and Avantgarde available at extra cost.

The interior was more rounded than that of the W124. The heating system remained separately adjustable for driver and front passenger and was fitted as standard with a dust filter and recirculation function. The W210 retained real-wood trim. Switch openings in the wood trim were cut according to the equipment fitted, so unused blanking covers were not installed in those trim pieces. The instrument cluster used transmitted-light illumination and digital odometer displays. A warning lamp indicated bulb failures. A pneumatic system operated the headlamp range adjustment, central locking and optional folding rear head restraints.

=== Technology ===
Equipment newly offered on the E-Class included a rain sensor, automatic climate control with air-quality sensor and Parktronic parking assistance. Standard equipment included the Electronic Traction System (ETS), front and rear electric windows, an outside-temperature display and a third brake light.

At launch, most engines were carried over from the predecessor or related Mercedes-Benz models, or were developments of existing engines. The E 290 Turbodiesel introduced the OM 602 DE 29 LA direct-injection diesel engine. The E 200 Kompressor was not sold in Germany and was offered in export markets with displacement-based taxation.

Most models used a five-speed manual gearbox as standard. Four- and five-speed automatic transmissions were optional or standard depending on engine. For model year 1997, Mercedes-Benz introduced the electronically controlled 722.6 five-speed automatic transmission. After the 1999 facelift, engines up to 2.8 litres received a six-speed manual gearbox, and the five-speed automatic gained electronic Touch Shift selection.

The W210 used a five-link rear suspension further developed from earlier Mercedes-Benz designs. The previous strut-type front suspension was replaced by a double-wishbone front suspension similar to that of the W202 C-Class. Steering changed from recirculating ball to rack and pinion, with power assistance as standard and speed-sensitive parameter steering available at extra cost.

=== Launch range and early variants ===
At the sales start on 15 May 1995, the petrol models were E 200, E 230 and E 320, and the diesel models were E 220 Diesel and E 300 Diesel. Export models included the E 200 Kompressor and E 250 Diesel. From September 1995, the range was expanded with the E 280, E 420 and E 290 Turbodiesel. The E 50 AMG was introduced as the first AMG version of the series.

In 1996, the estate range was introduced with the E 200 T, E 230 T, E 420 T and E 290 Turbodiesel T. Export estate models included the E 200 Kompressor T and E 250 Diesel T. The E 200 Diesel saloon was offered for Portugal. A taxi version of the E 220 Diesel was also offered; its engine was reduced in output and compatible with biodiesel.

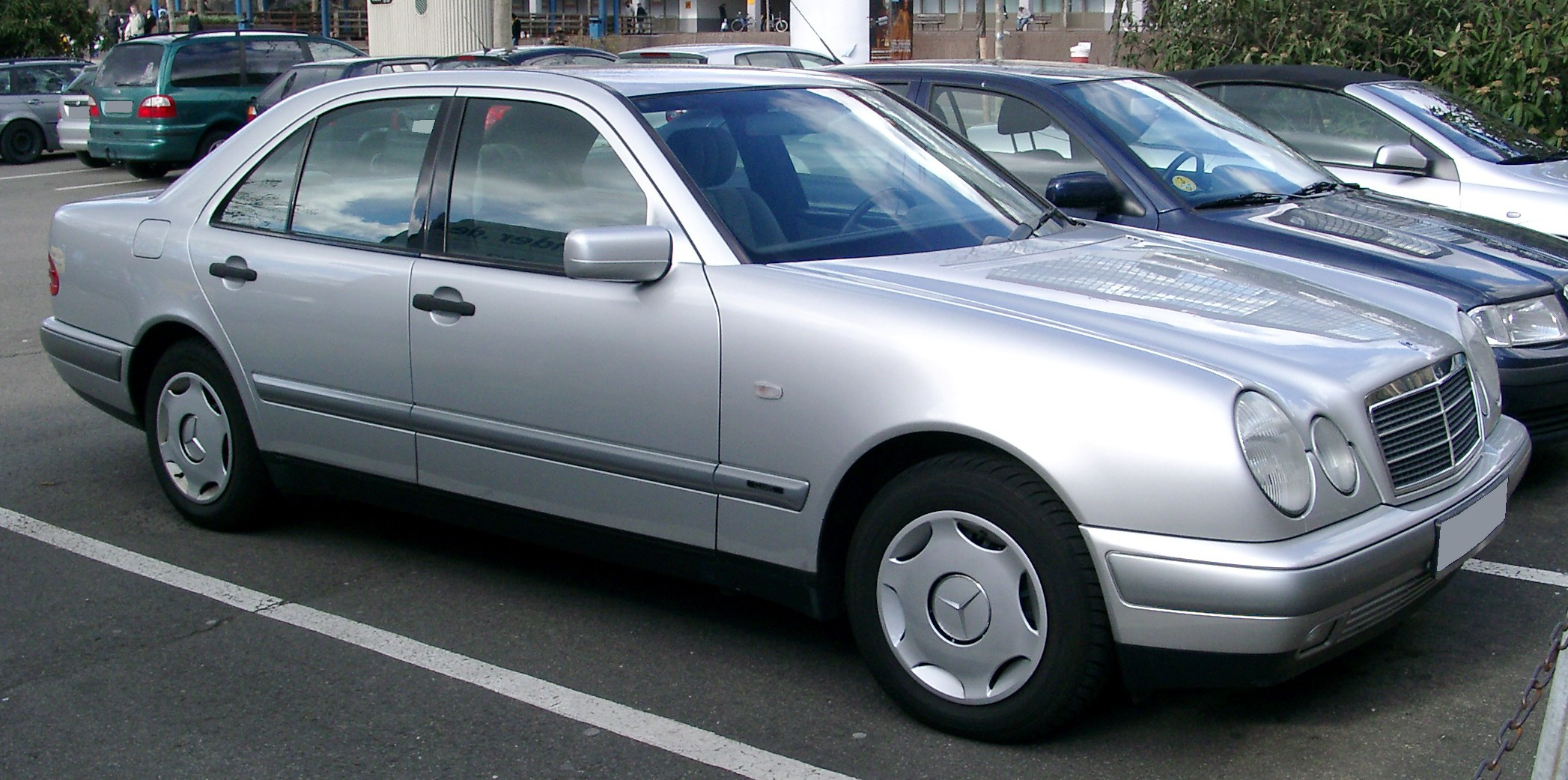
E-Class (1995–1999)

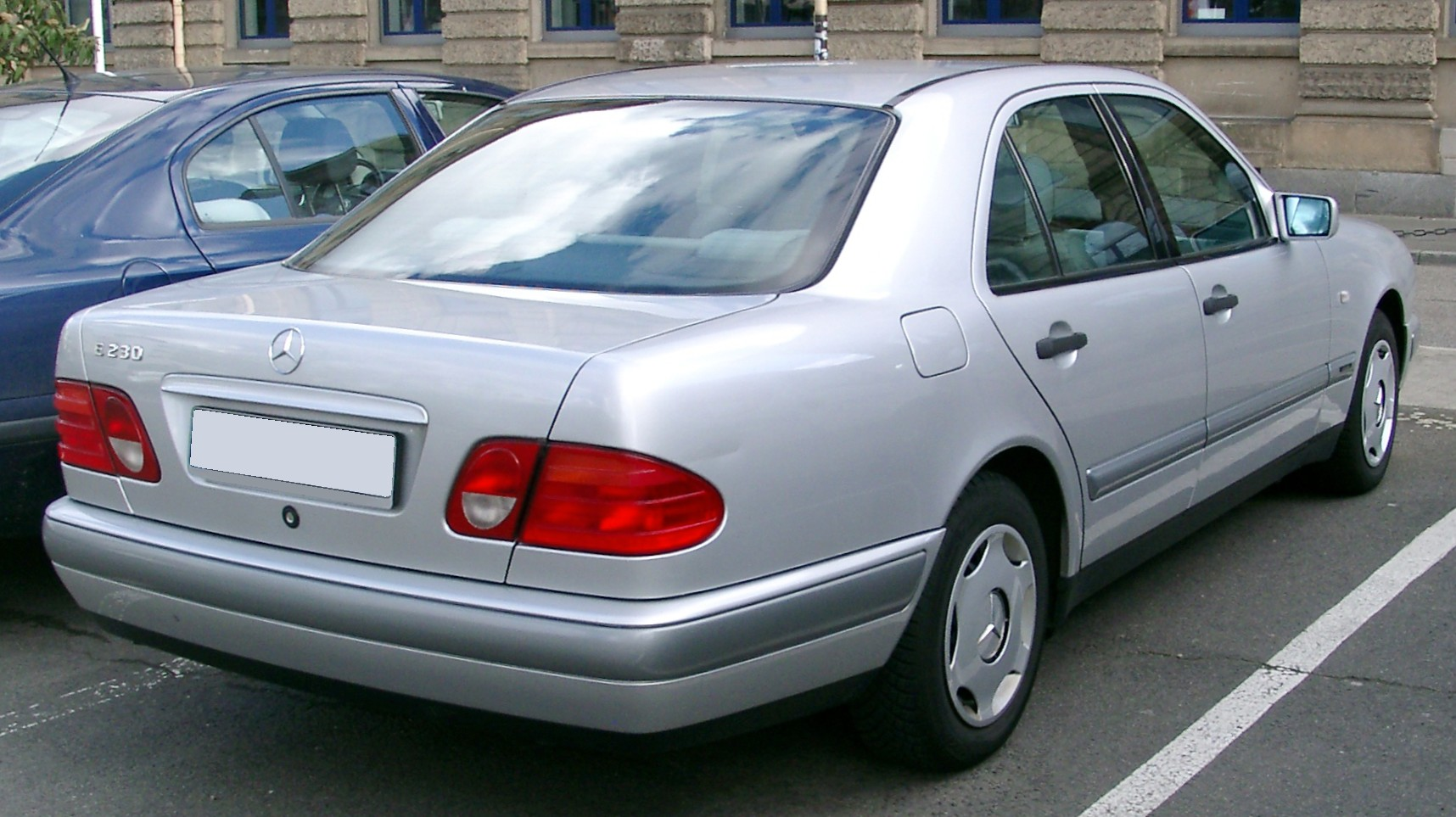
Rear view

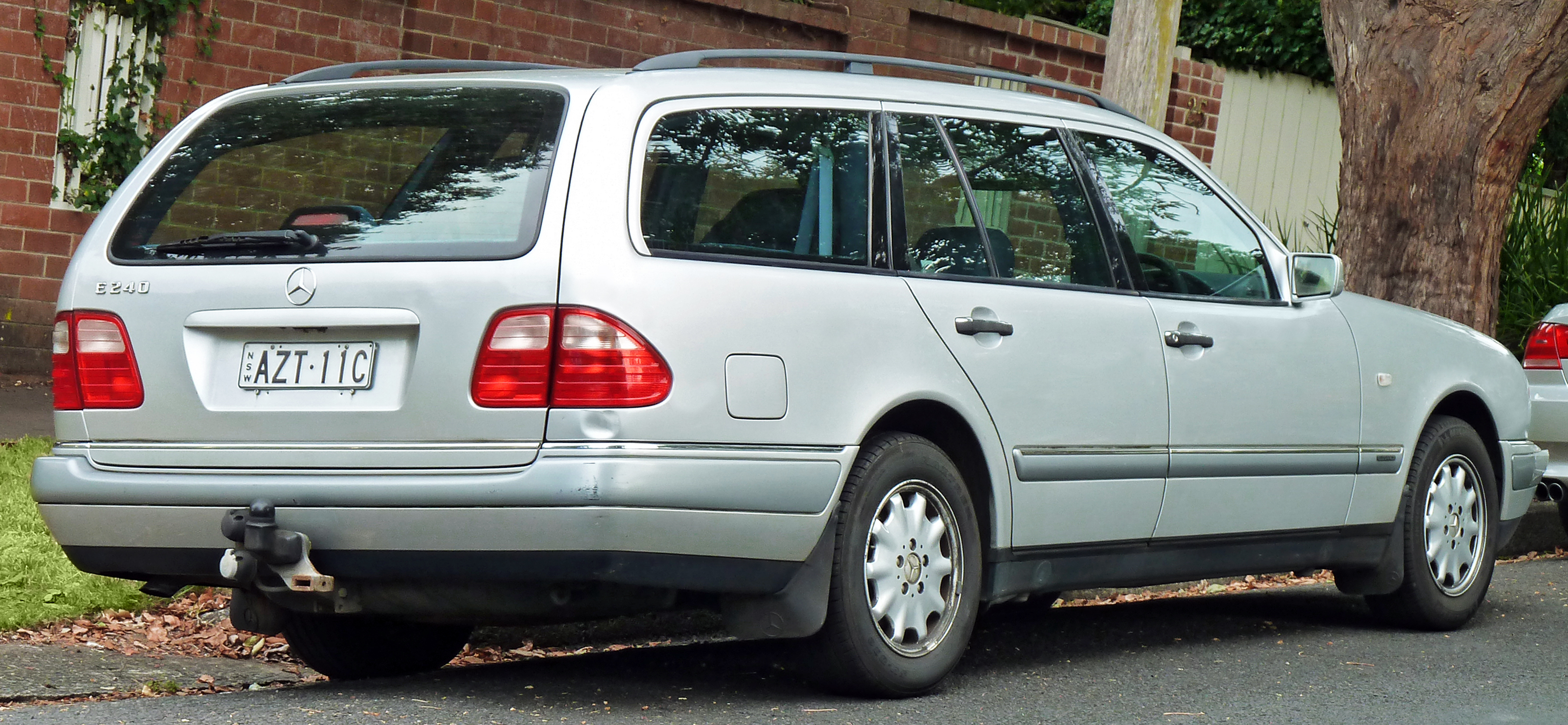
E 240 estate (1996–1999)

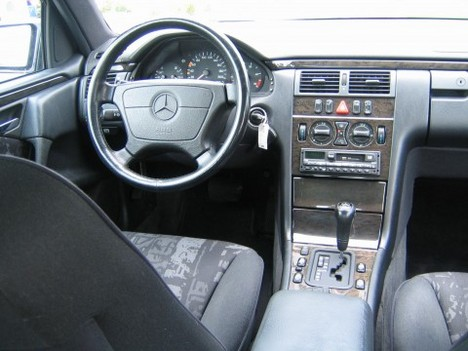
Avantgarde interior

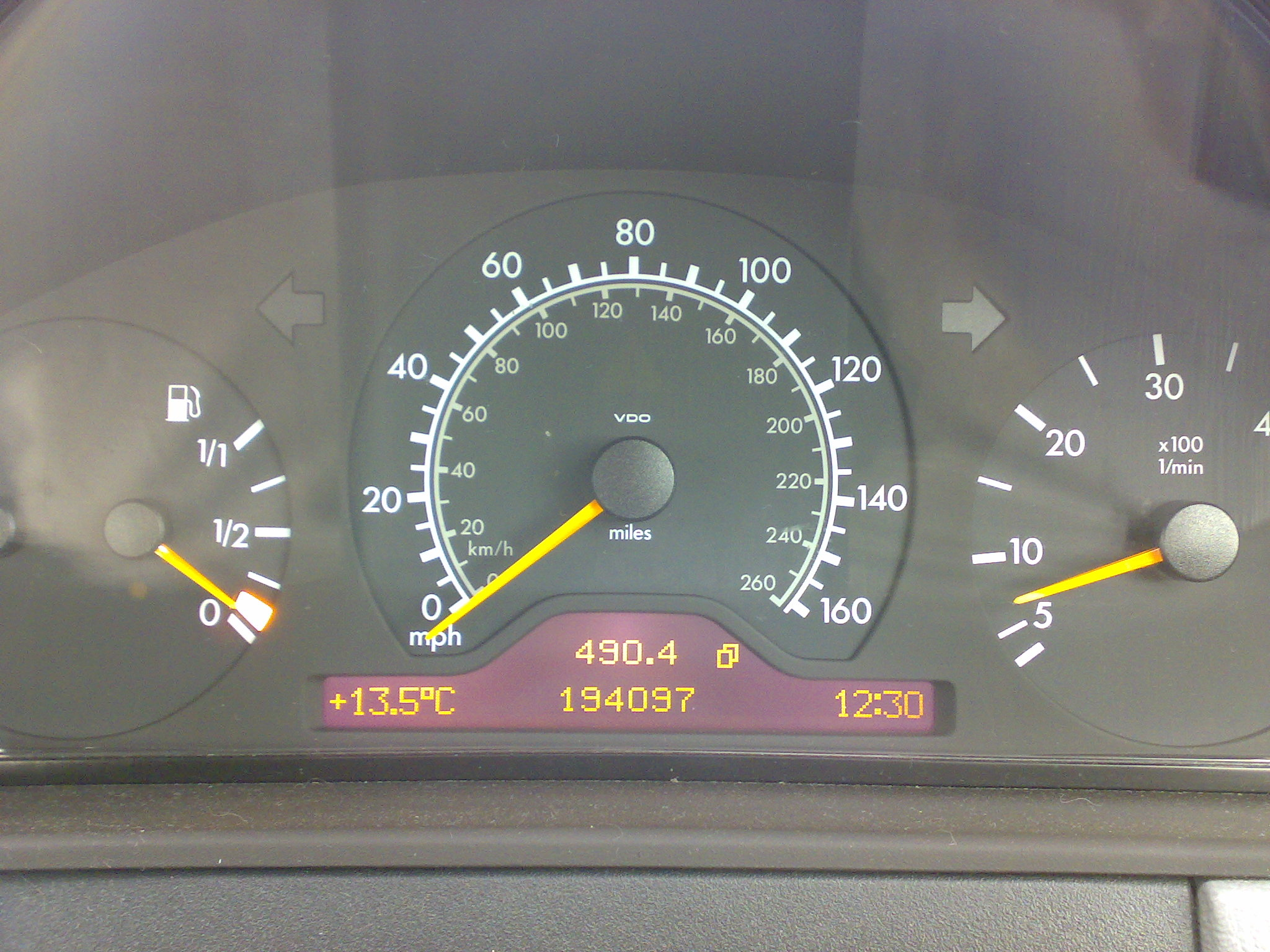
Instrument cluster with mph scale

== Body styles ==
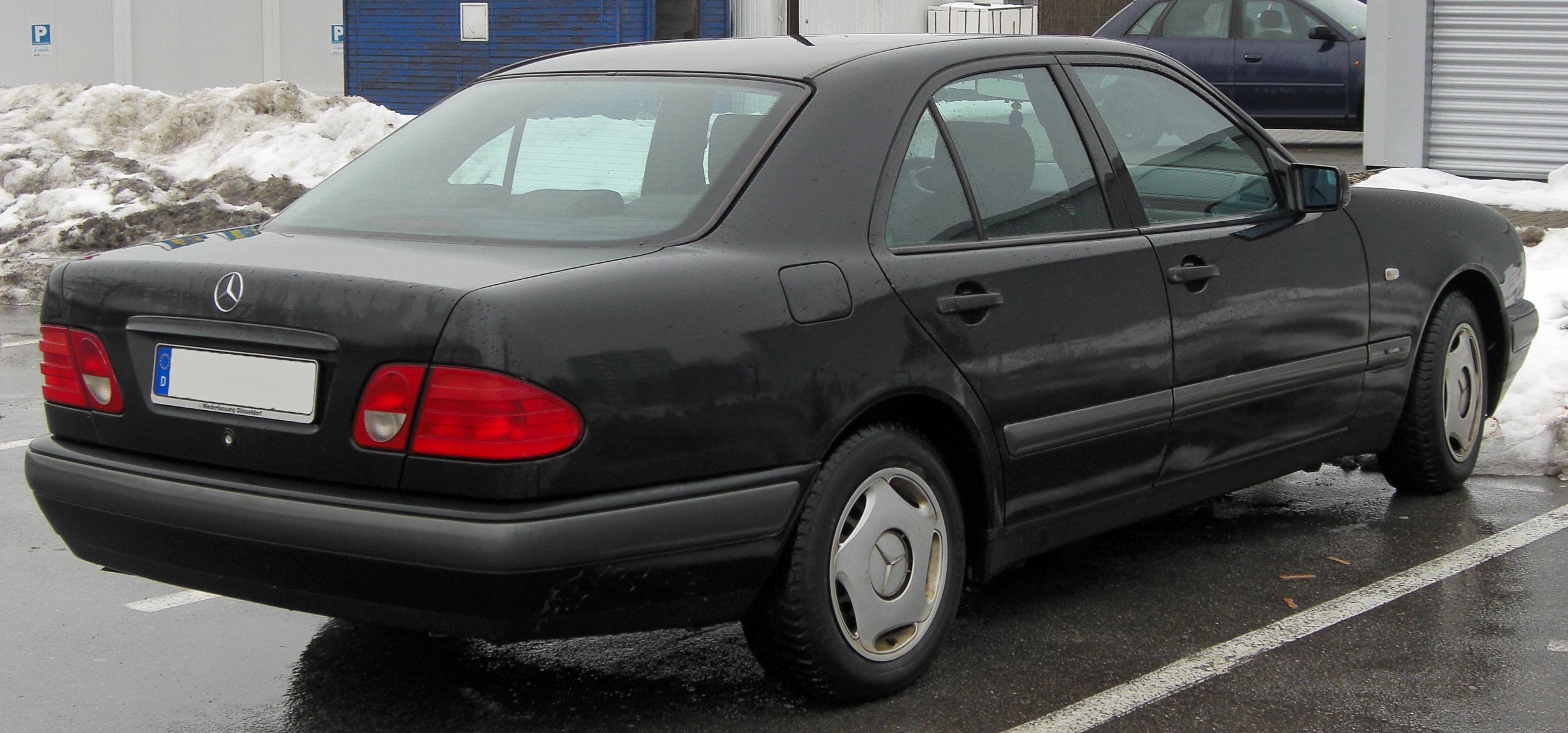
Saloon (W 210)

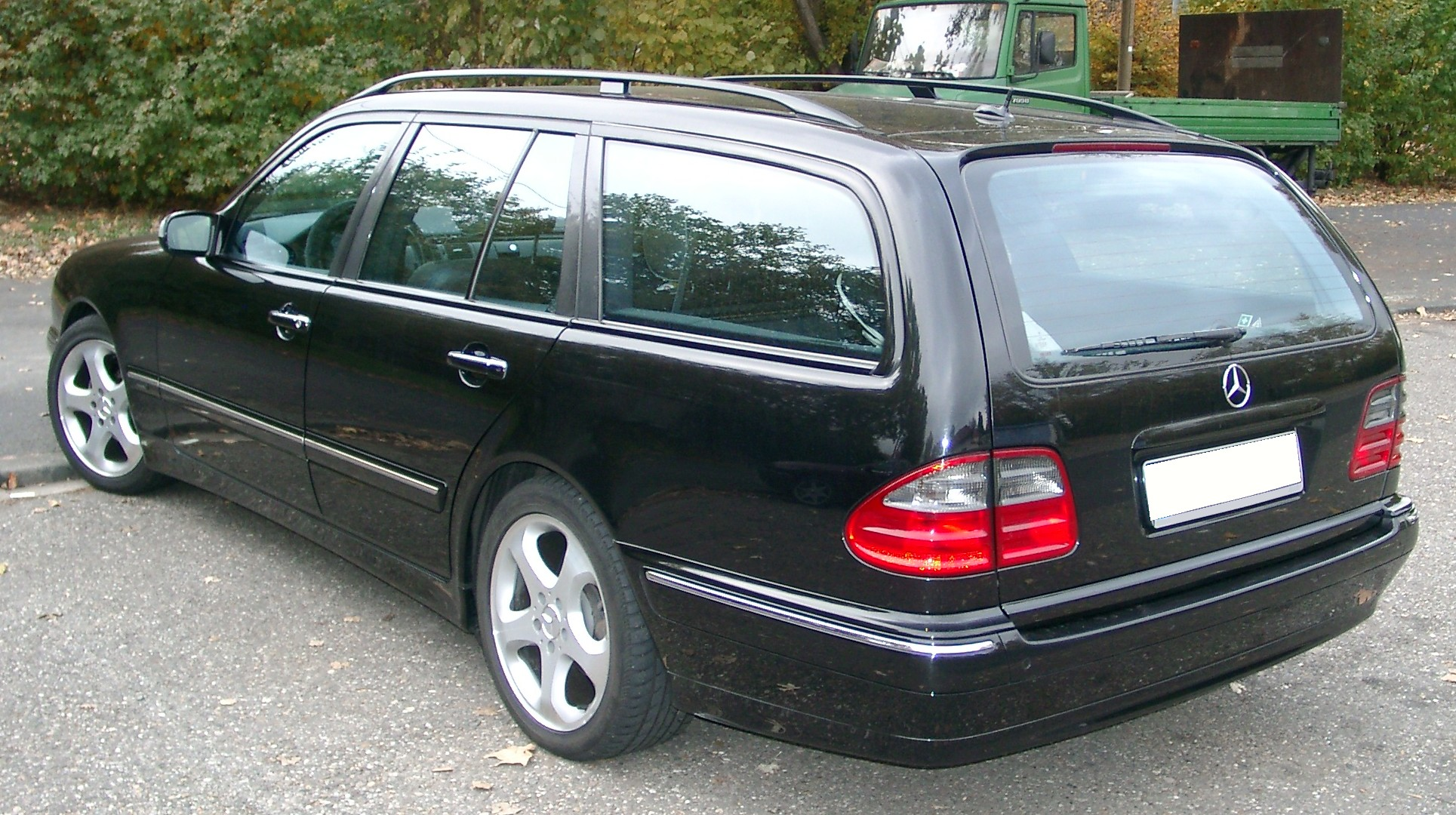
Estate (S 210)

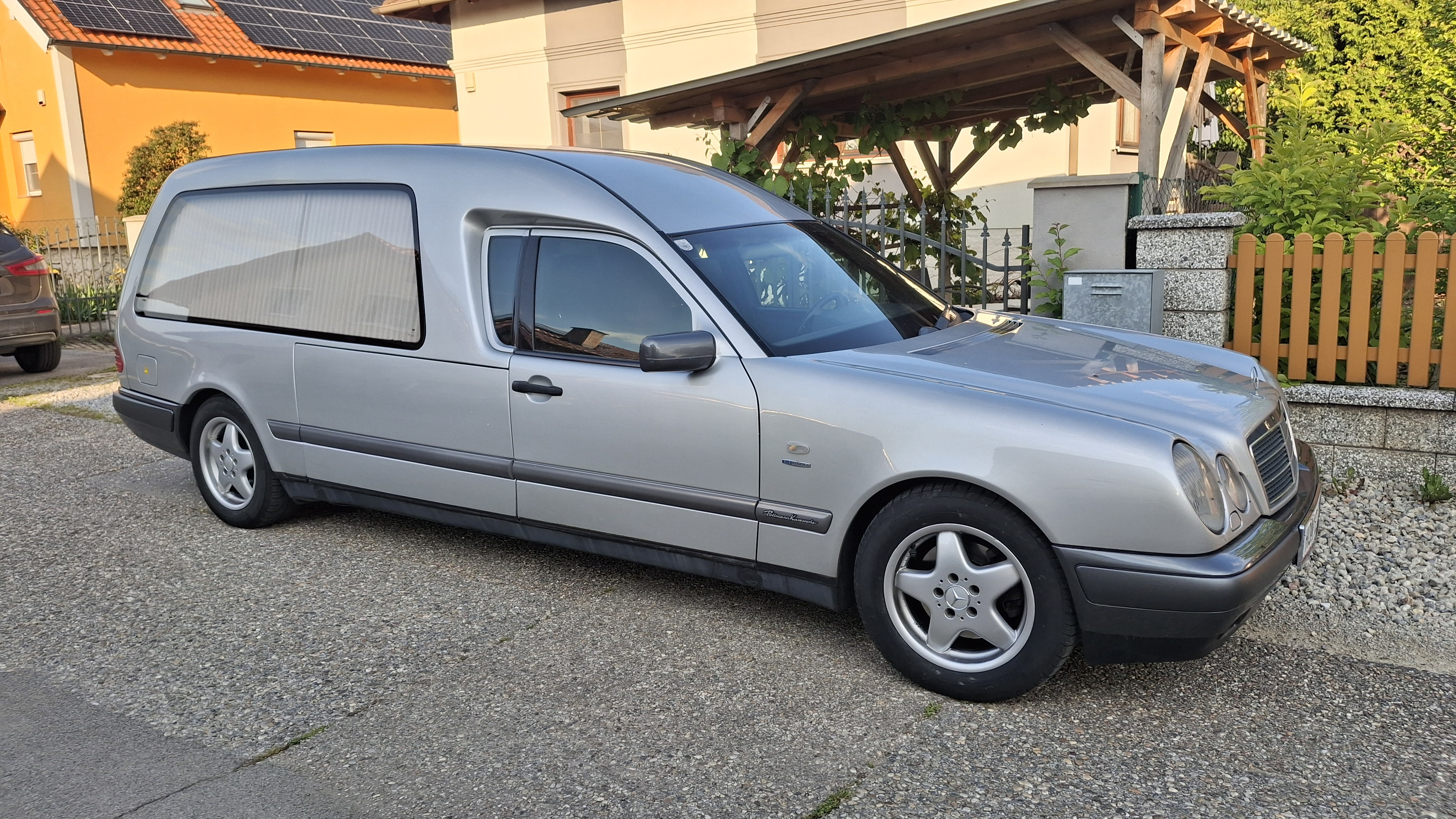
Hearse based on the long-wheelbase W210 chassis

Long-wheelbase saloon (V 210)

=== Saloon (W 210) ===
The saloon was launched in May 1995 as the first body style of the W210 E-Class generation. Boot volume was 520 litres with the 65-litre fuel tank and 500 litres with the 80-litre fuel tank. A through-loading facility with ski bag was available at extra cost; this required a tunnel through the fuel tank behind the rear seat and reduced fuel capacity to 70 litres.

The saloon was available as a factory armoured special-protection vehicle. The E 420 and E 430 could be ordered with B6 high protection throughout production. From March 1997, B4 protection was also available. Because the B4 package was lighter, it was also offered on the E 320. Factory integration allowed the protective elements to be incorporated into the body structure during production.

Saloon production totalled 1,374,409 vehicles.

=== Estate (S 210) ===
The estate, internally designated S 210, was introduced in June 1996. Load volume was 600 litres to the height of the load cover with the rear seat raised. With the rear seat folded, seat cushions removed and loading to the roof, maximum load volume was 1,975 litres. The asymmetrically split folding rear seat was standard on the estate.

Estate production totalled 279,238 vehicles through December 2002. Not all engines were available in this body style.

=== Chassis (VF 210) ===
The chassis version, internally designated VF 210, was introduced at the same time as the estate. It was aimed at body builders producing hearses and ambulances. Unlike the W124, no standard-wheelbase chassis was offered; only the extended-wheelbase version with a 74 cm longer wheelbase was available. Initial production used the E 290 Turbodiesel, later joined by the E 250 Diesel for Italy, E 280, E 220 CDI and E 270 CDI.

=== Long-wheelbase limousine (V 210) ===
A long-wheelbase limousine based on the W210 was developed in 1996 after a request from the Thai royal family. The E 320 version had a wheelbase extended by 97 cm, six doors and a full third row of seats. Because of demand, Mercedes put the long version into series production from late 1996. Customers could choose five and six-cylinder petrol or diesel models. A four-door version with opposing rear seats was also built.

=== GUARD versions ===
The W210 was available with factory armouring under the GUARD programme. Two protection levels were offered: B4 and B6. The E 320 and E 430 were offered with B4 armouring, while the E 420 and E 430 were offered with B6 armouring.

GUARD-version features included bullet-resistant glass, no sunroof, partial opening of the driver's side window, fixed remaining windows, reinforced structure and suspension, self-levelling rear suspension, an optional microphone with external speaker, and data-card codes for B4 or B6 special-protection versions.

== Model updates ==
=== Minor update, 1997 ===
In March 1997, the W210 received a minor update. The infrared remote locking system was replaced by a radio-frequency keyless system with the ELCODE electronic drive authorisation system. Brake Assist and traction control became standard. Front-door side airbags and automatic door locking from 8 km/h became standard. The ASSYST service computer introduced flexible service intervals based on operating conditions.

The M104 inline-six engines in the E 280 and E 320 were replaced by the M112 V6. The M112 used a 90-degree V layout, aluminium construction and three valves per cylinder. These engines were also available with 4MATIC. The E 300 Turbodiesel was also introduced.

At the 1997 Frankfurt Motor Show, the E 240 replaced the four-cylinder E 230 in many markets. The E 420 and E 50 AMG were replaced by the E 430 and E 55 AMG. Export-market changes included increased output for the E 200 Kompressor and the addition of the E 250 Turbodiesel.

In June 1998, the E 200 CDI and E 220 CDI introduced the OM 611 common-rail diesel engine family to the E-Class. The common-rail system stored injection pressure for all cylinders in a shared rail at up to 1,350 bar.

=== Major facelift, 1999 ===
For the 2000 model year, the facelift also added a multifunction information display in the instrument cluster and steering-wheel controls for audio, navigation and telephone functions. The five-speed automatic transmission received a manual +/- selector gate, marketed as Touch Shift, replacing the earlier gated selector layout. Exterior facelift changes included a revised front end with a steeper rake, restyled bumpers and lower body trim. Saloons received new tail lamps, while the estate tailgate was revised and the centre high-mounted stop lamp was moved from the base of the rear window to a position directly above it.

Late-production W210 special editions included E 320 and E 430 versions in quartz silver or obsidian black with xenon headlamps, 17-inch alloy wheels and black maple wood trim. Estate models, and saloons optionally, used self-levelling rear suspension with suspension struts, gas-filled suspension spheres, a pressure pump and rear coil springs to maintain static ride height.

The W210 received a major facelift in August 1999. More than 1,800 components were replaced or modified. Exterior changes included a lowered front end, body-coloured side skirts and door handles, rounded door mirrors with integrated LED indicators, new tail lamps, a redesigned rear bumper, revised estate roof rails and new wheels or wheel covers. Design patents for the facelifted W210 were filed on 21 July 1998.

The interior received new materials and redesigned door panels. Folding roof grab handles replaced fixed handles. A multifunction steering wheel with eight buttons controlled the telephone, radio and trip computer. A central display in the instrument cluster showed information from these systems. ESP and window airbags (Windowbags) became standard. New optional equipment included ventilated front seats, dynamic navigation and the COMAND infotainment system.

The diesel range was revised. The E 200 CDI and E 220 CDI received increased output. The E 220 CDI replaced the E 290 Turbodiesel. The E 300 Turbodiesel was replaced by the E 270 CDI and E 320 CDI. The petrol range initially remained unchanged. In mid-2000, the E 200 and export E 200 Kompressor versions were replaced by the M111 EVO-based E 200 Kompressor. The E 240 engine displacement increased from 2.4 to 2.6 litres while the model name remained unchanged.

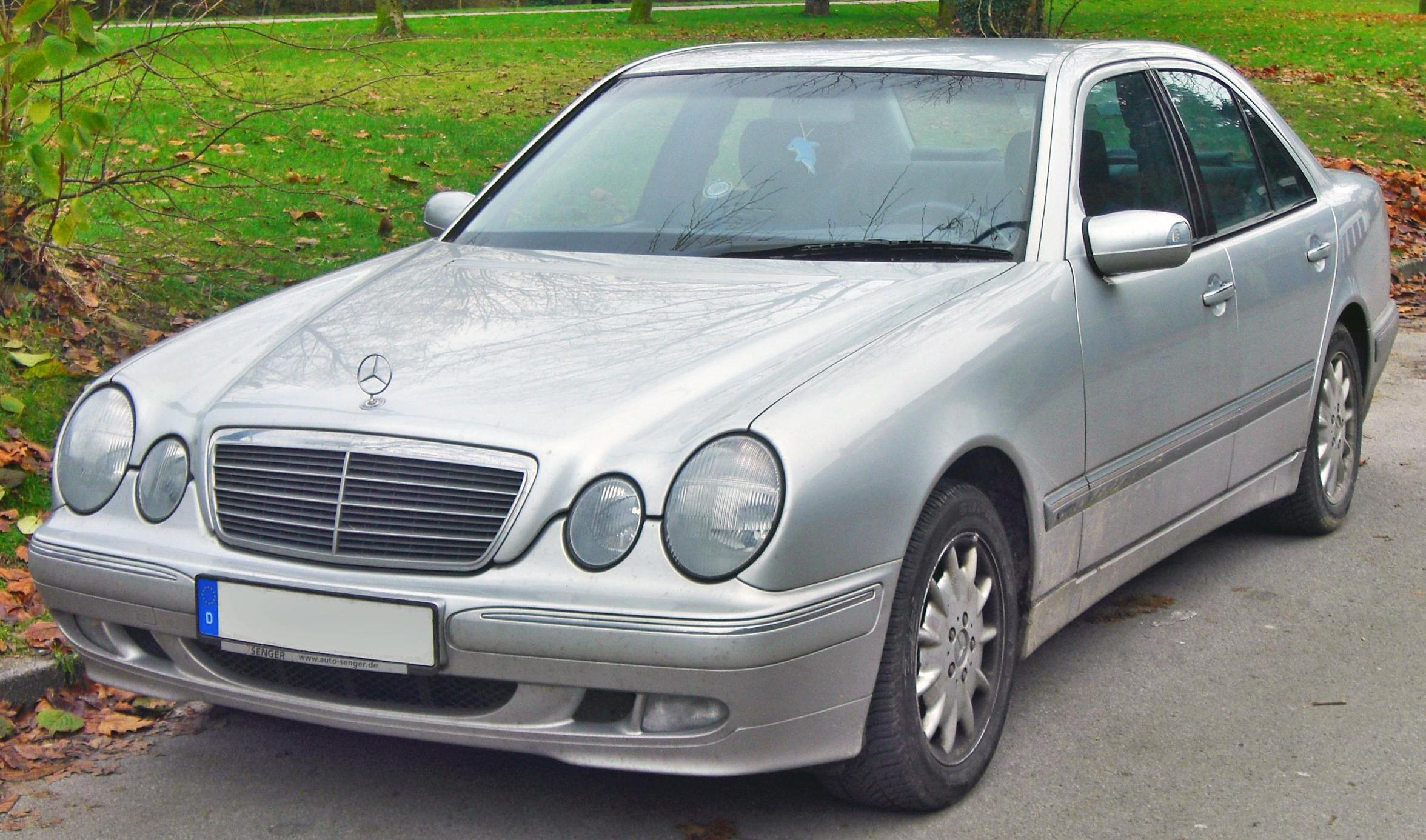
E 270 CDI Elegance (1999–2002)

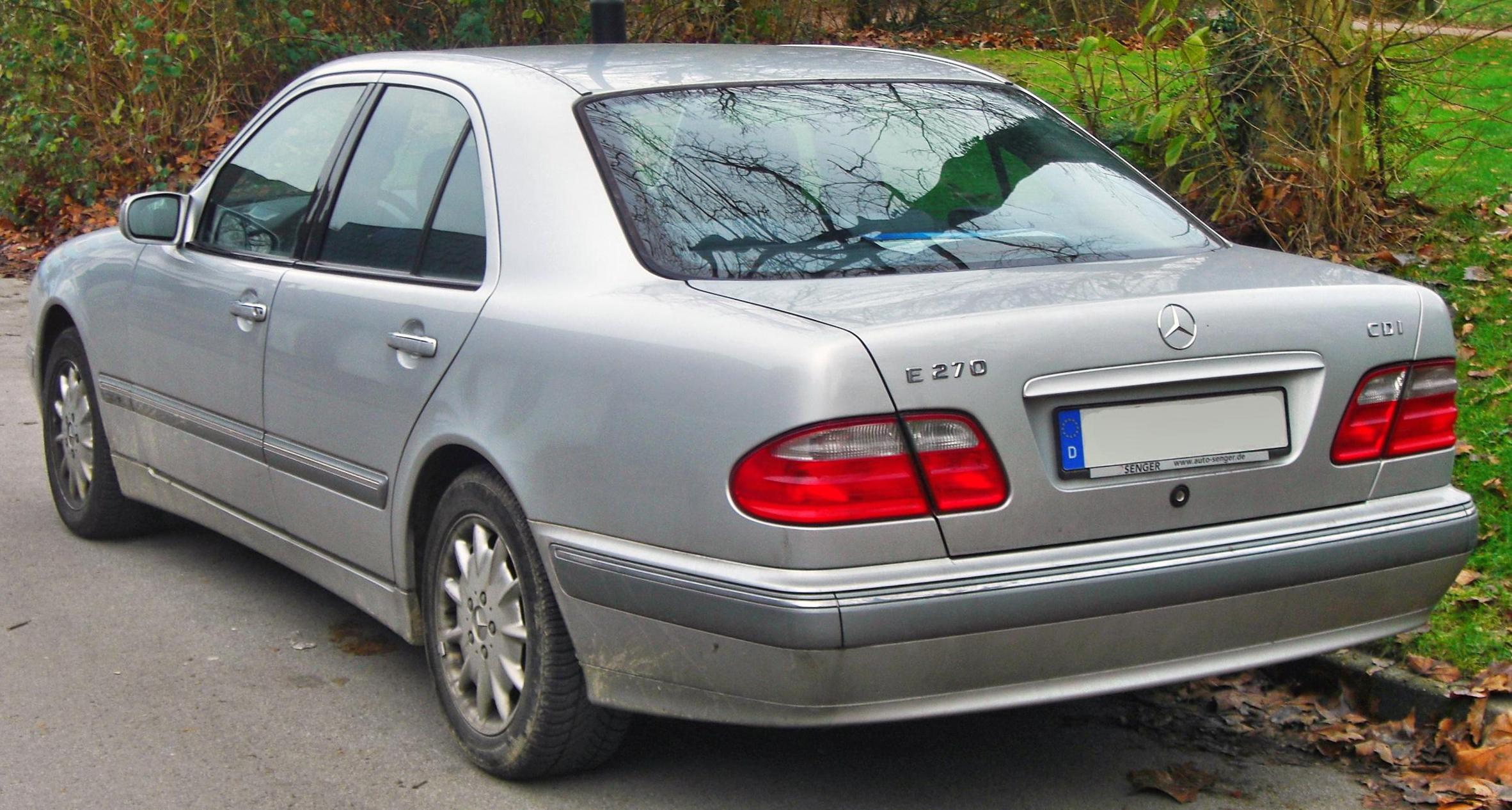
Rear view

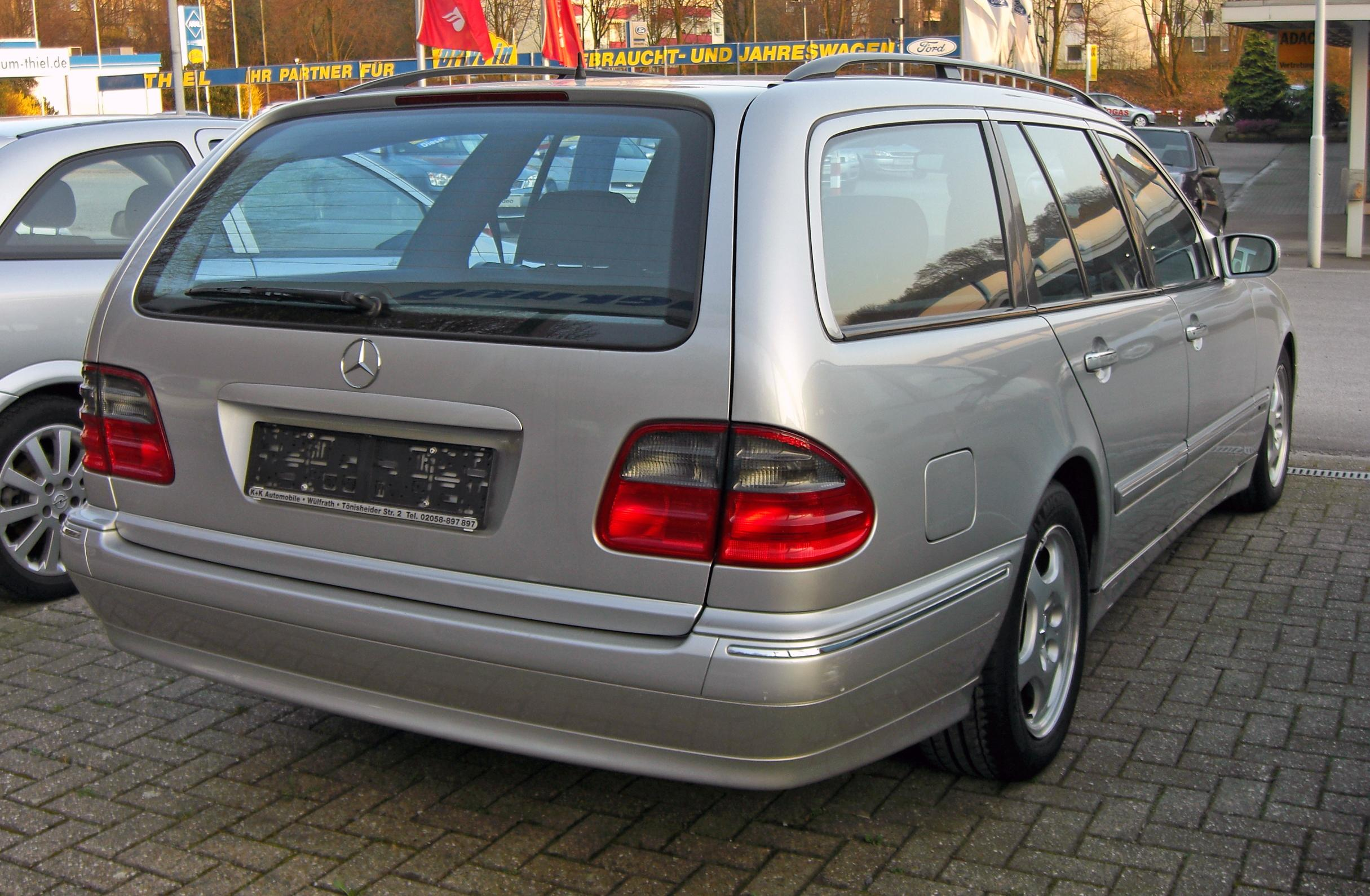
E-Class estate (1999–2003)

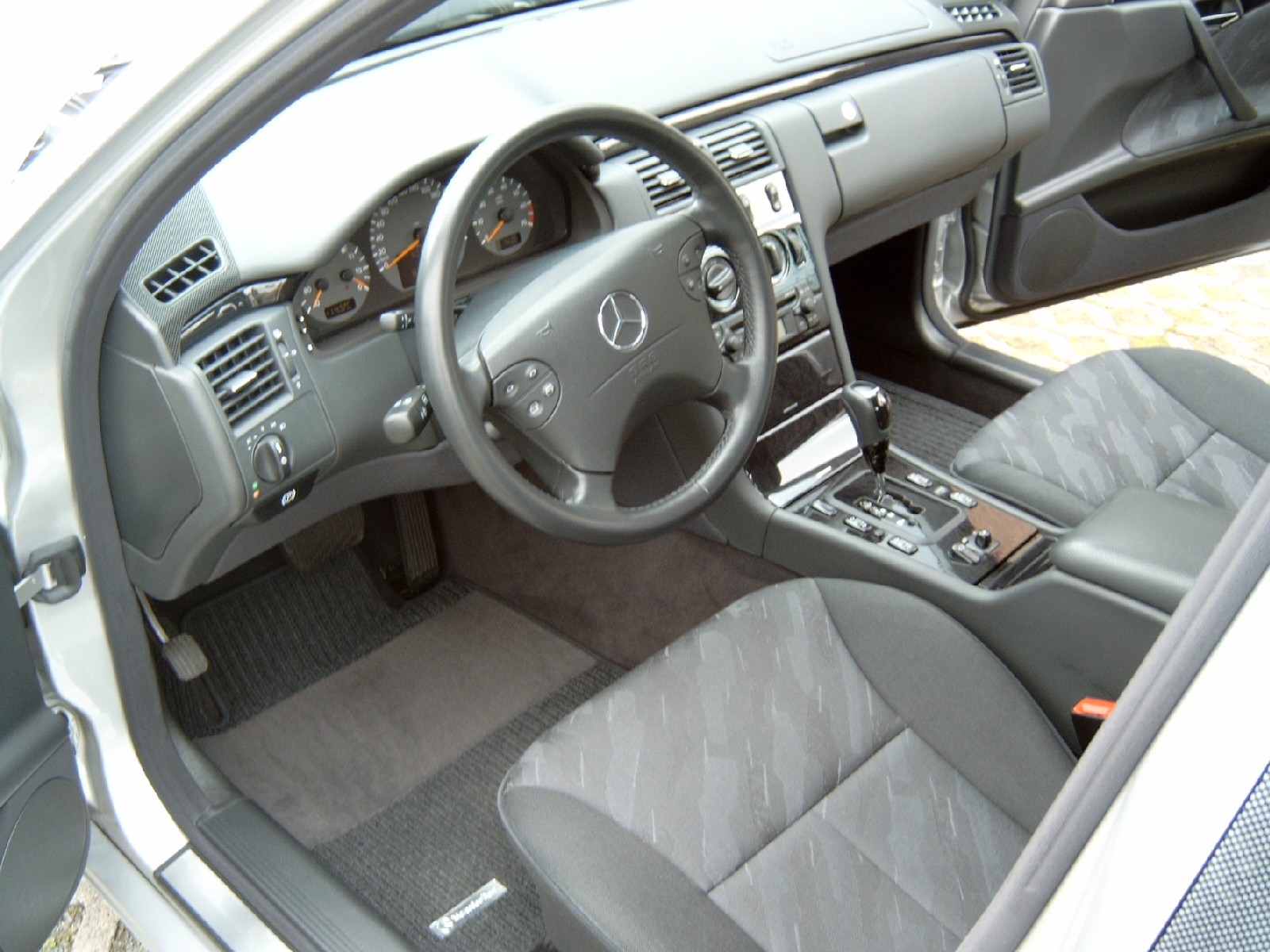
Avantgarde interior after the major facelift

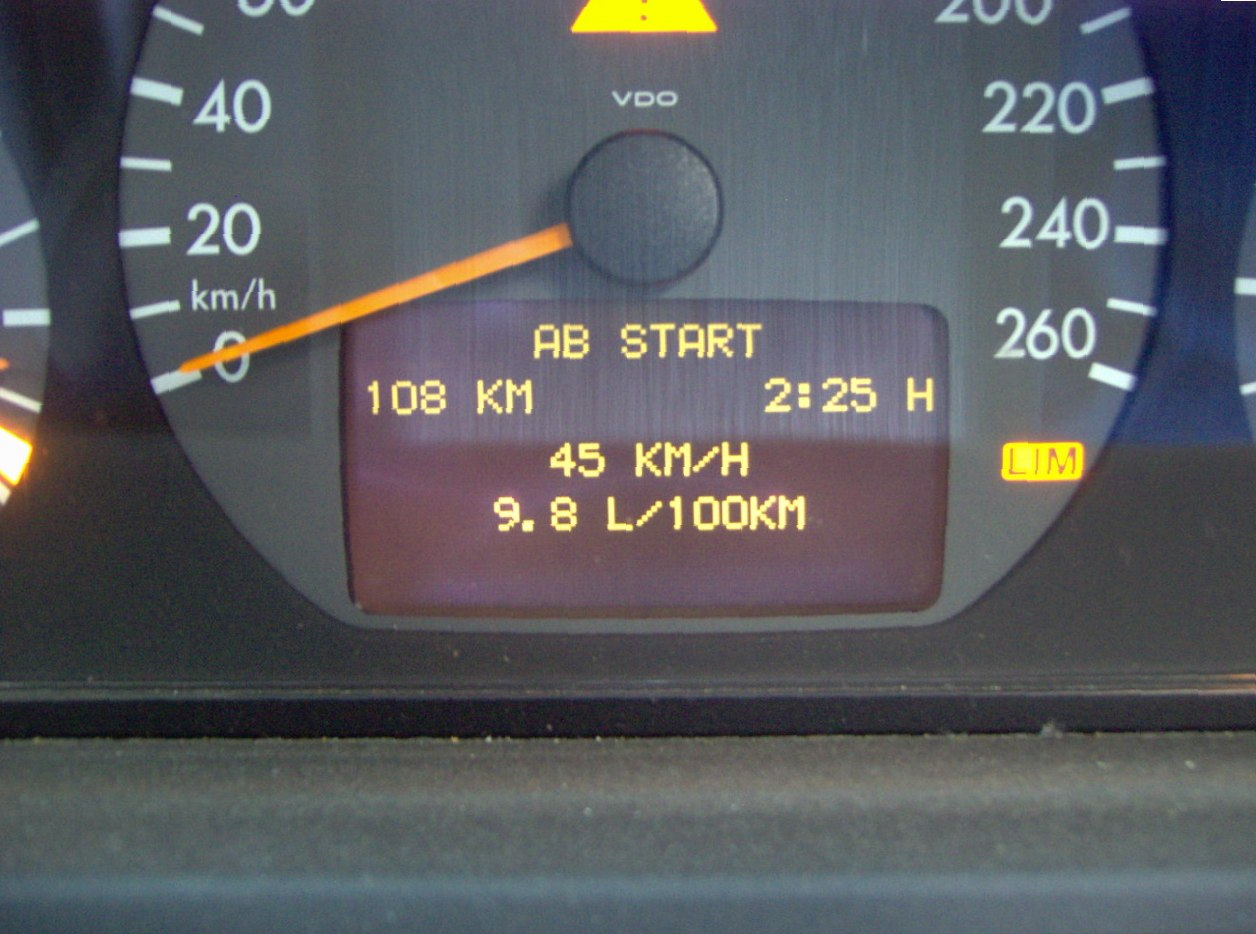
Central instrument-cluster display

== Equipment lines ==
=== Classic ===
Classic was the base equipment line. Externally, it had black door handles, contrasting rubbing strips and Classic badges. The B-pillars, beltline trim and roof trim were finished in haematite black. Depending on engine, 15- or 16-inch steel wheels with wheel covers were standard. The E 420 used 16-inch Elegance-style alloy wheels as standard. After the facelift, the wheel-cover design changed, “Cannes” cloth and “Alameda” wood were introduced, and the door handles were painted in body colour.

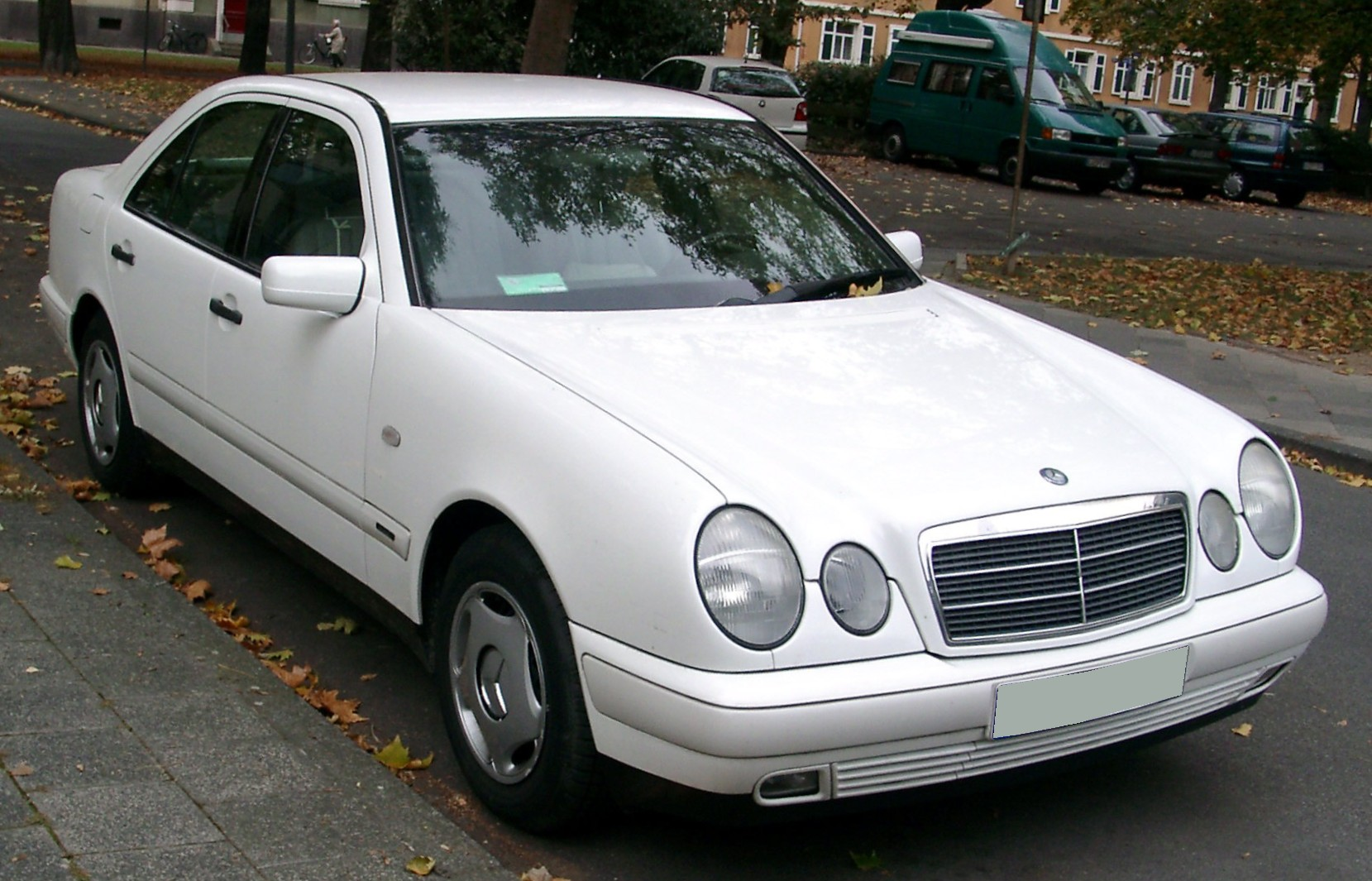
W 210 Classic (1995–1999)

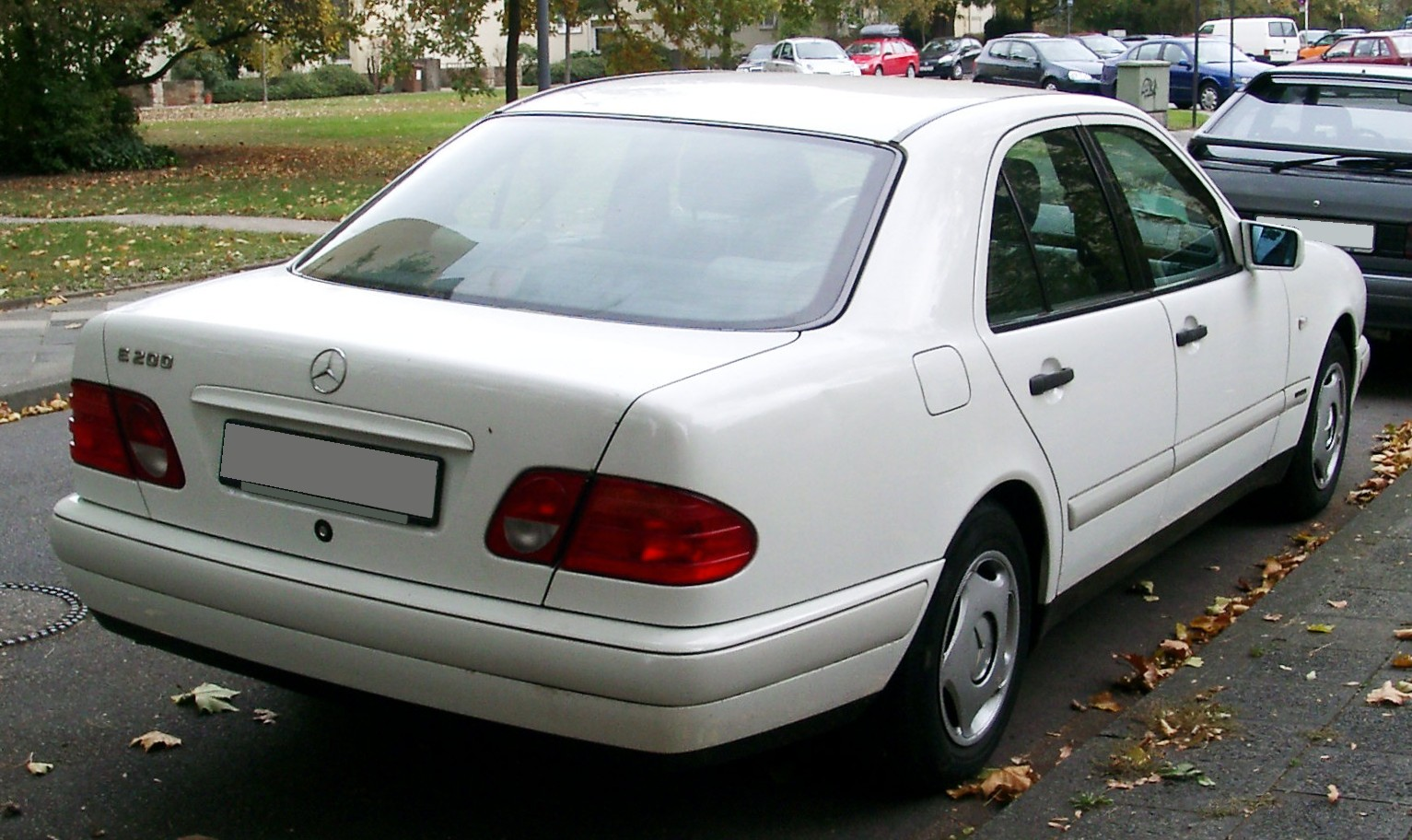
Rear view

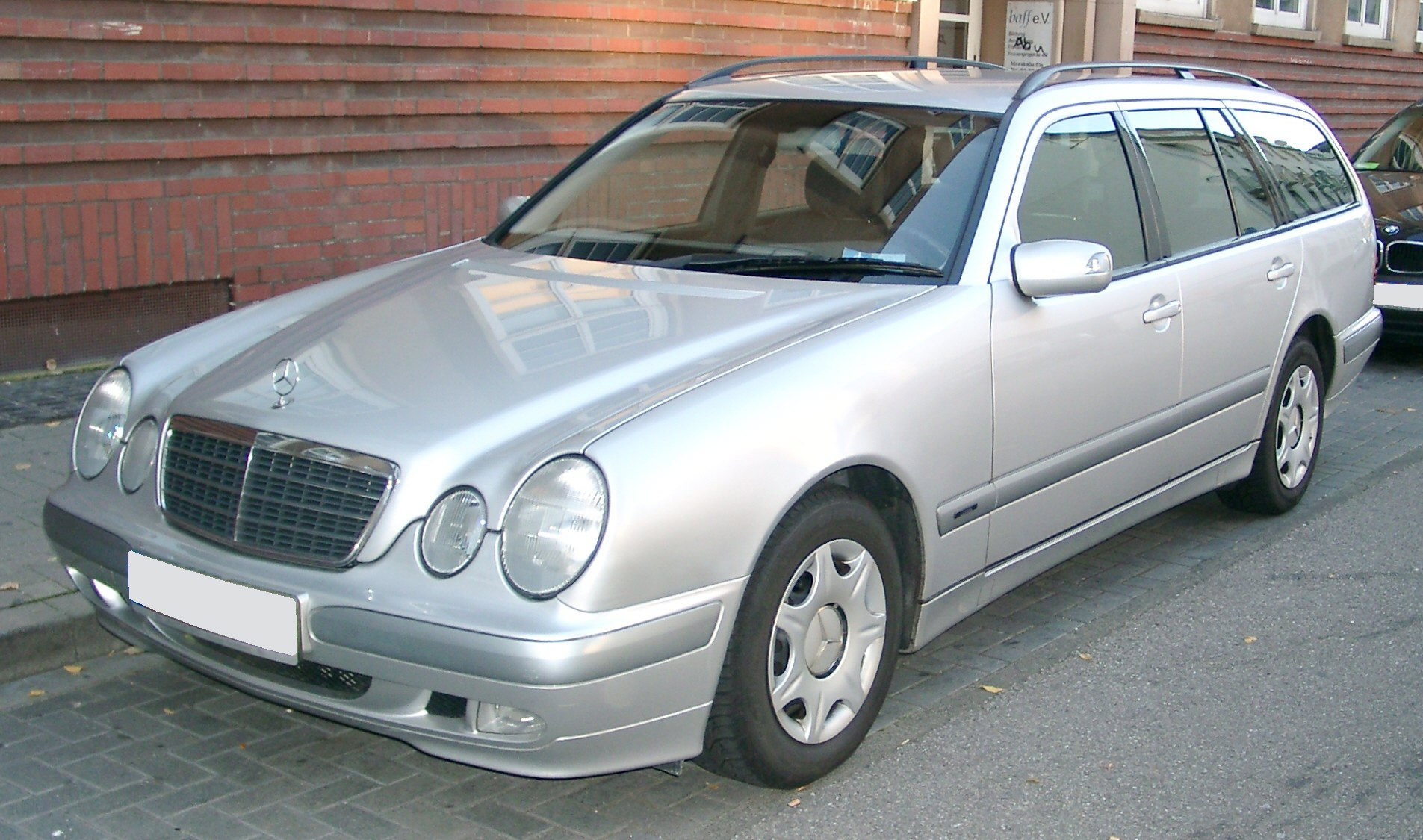
S 210 Classic (1999–2003)

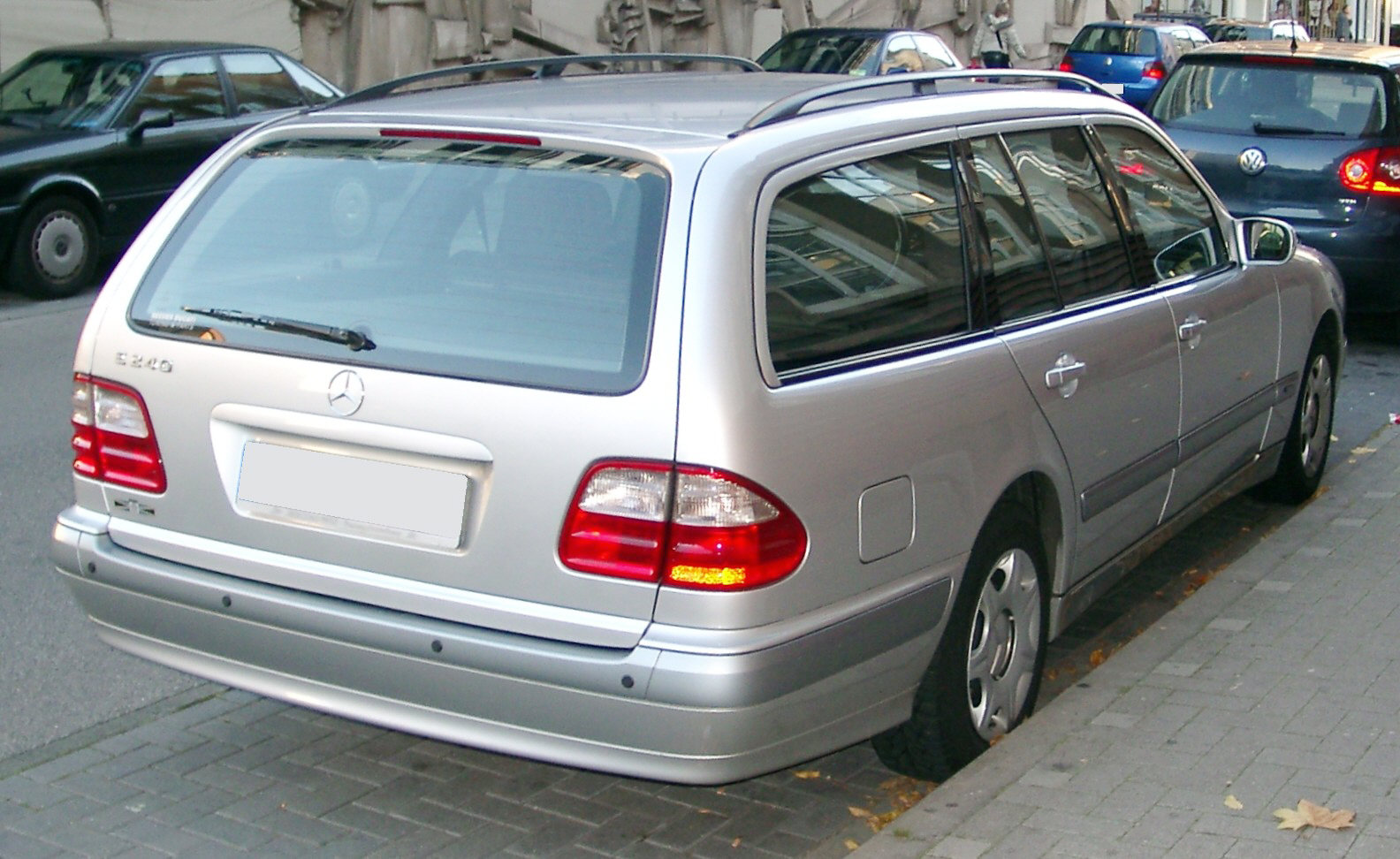
Rear view

=== Elegance ===
Elegance added chrome trim to the bumpers, rubbing strips and door handles. Roof trim was body-coloured and ten-hole alloy wheels were standard. Interior additions included map pockets on the front seatbacks, door exit lights, illuminated vanity mirrors, colour-matched seat belts, an automatically dimming interior mirror, an armrest with compartment and rear ventilation outlets, leather-covered steering wheel and selector, “Prestige” cloth and burr walnut trim.

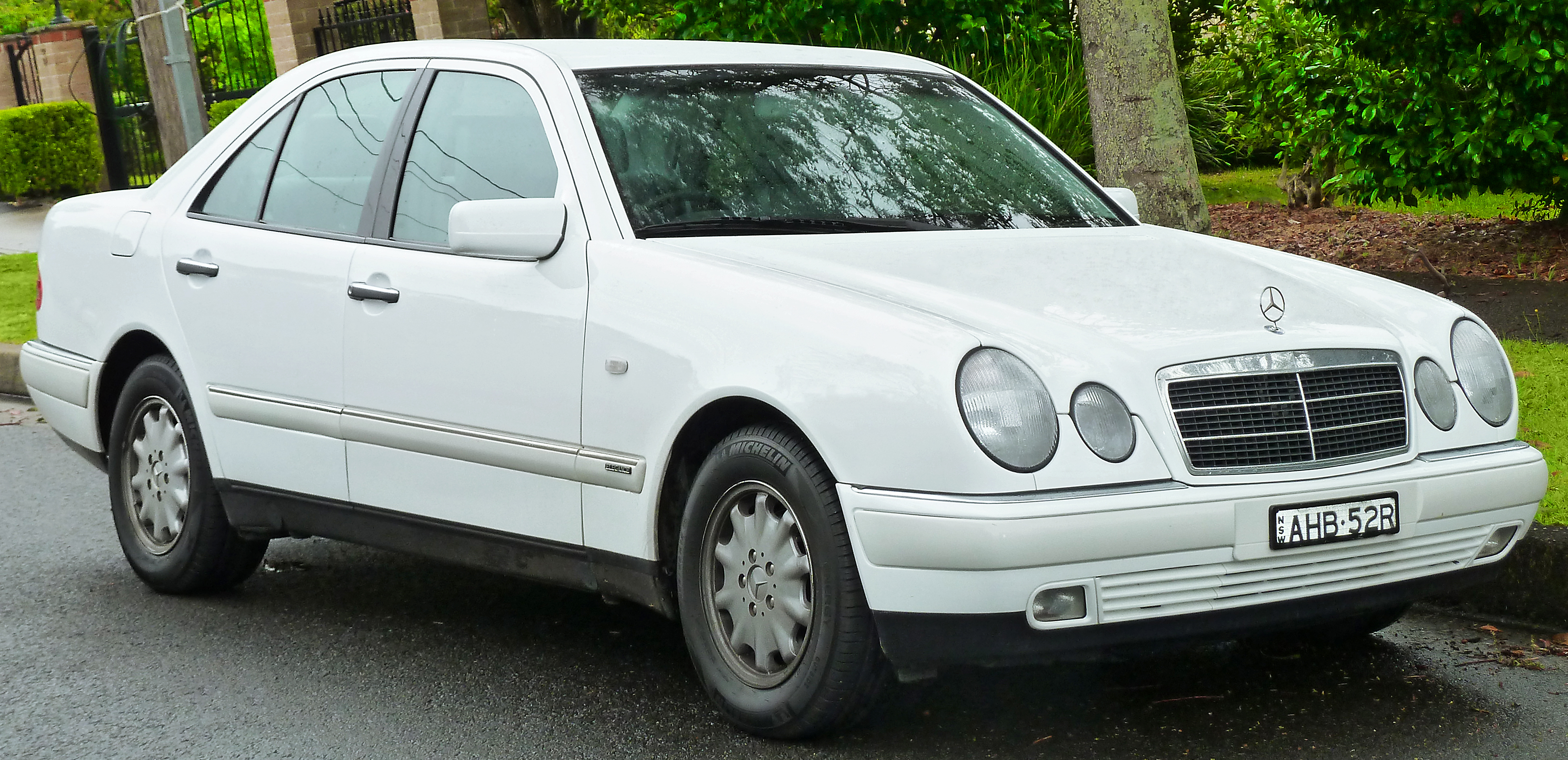
E 240 Elegance (1995–1999)

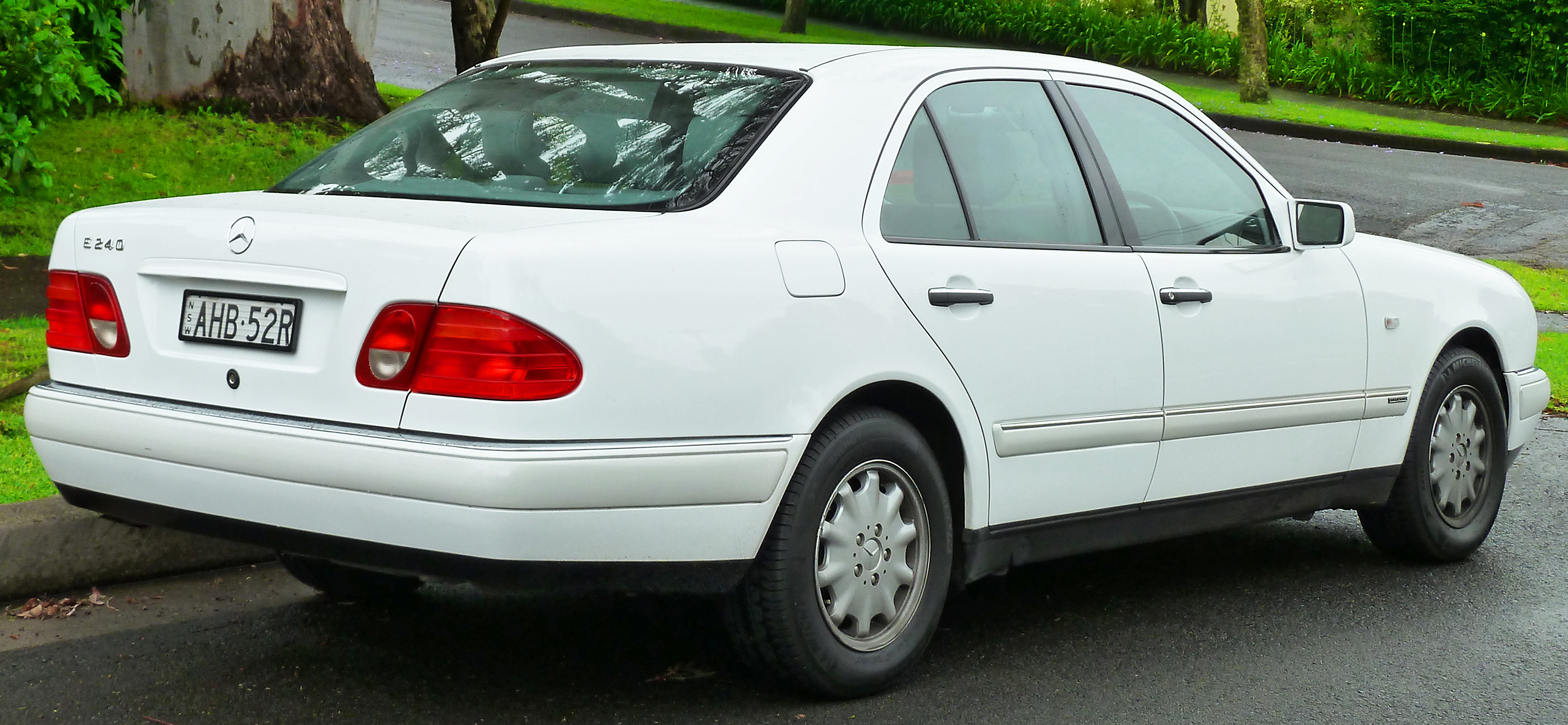
Rear view

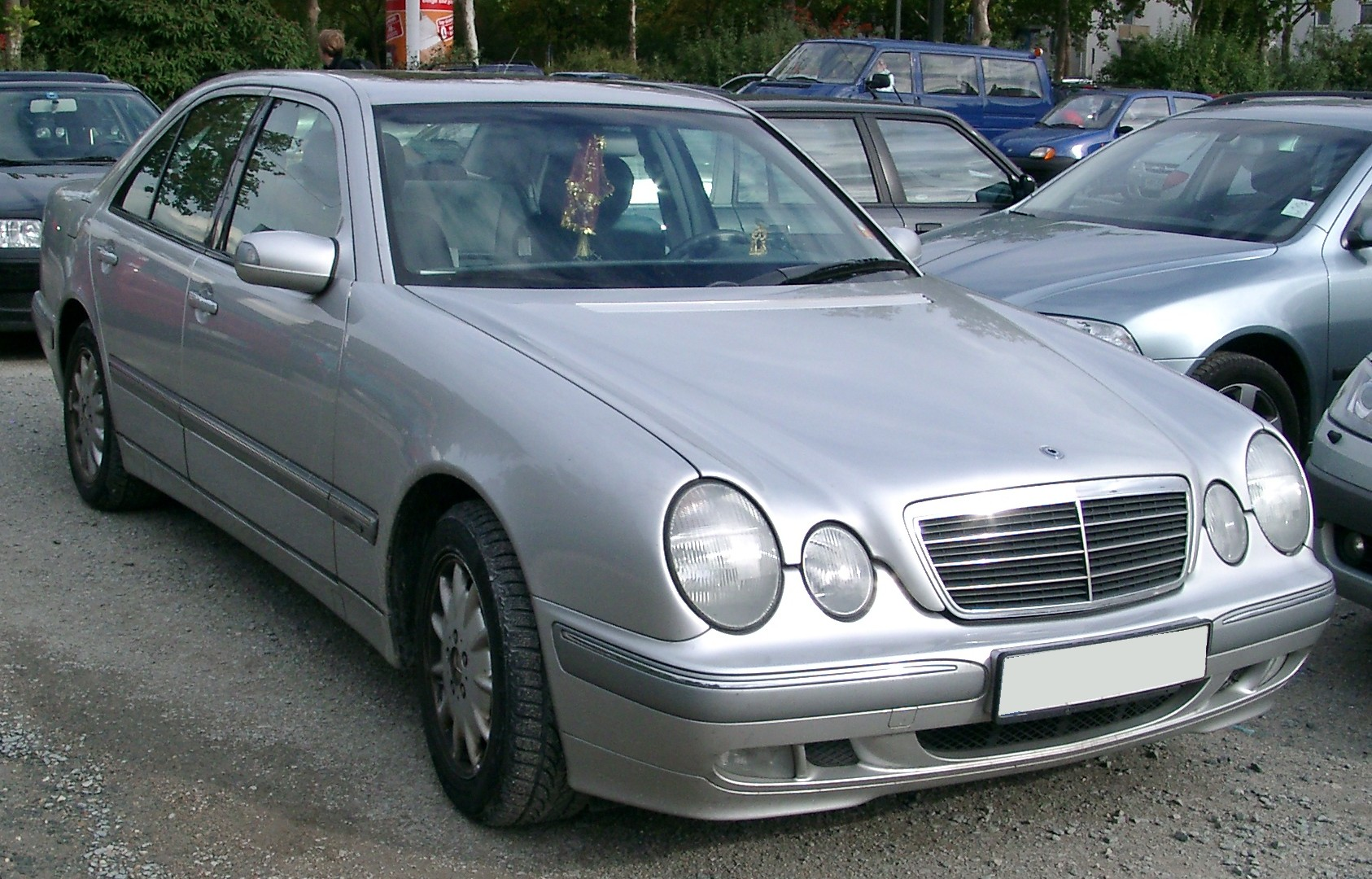
W 210 Elegance (1999–2002)

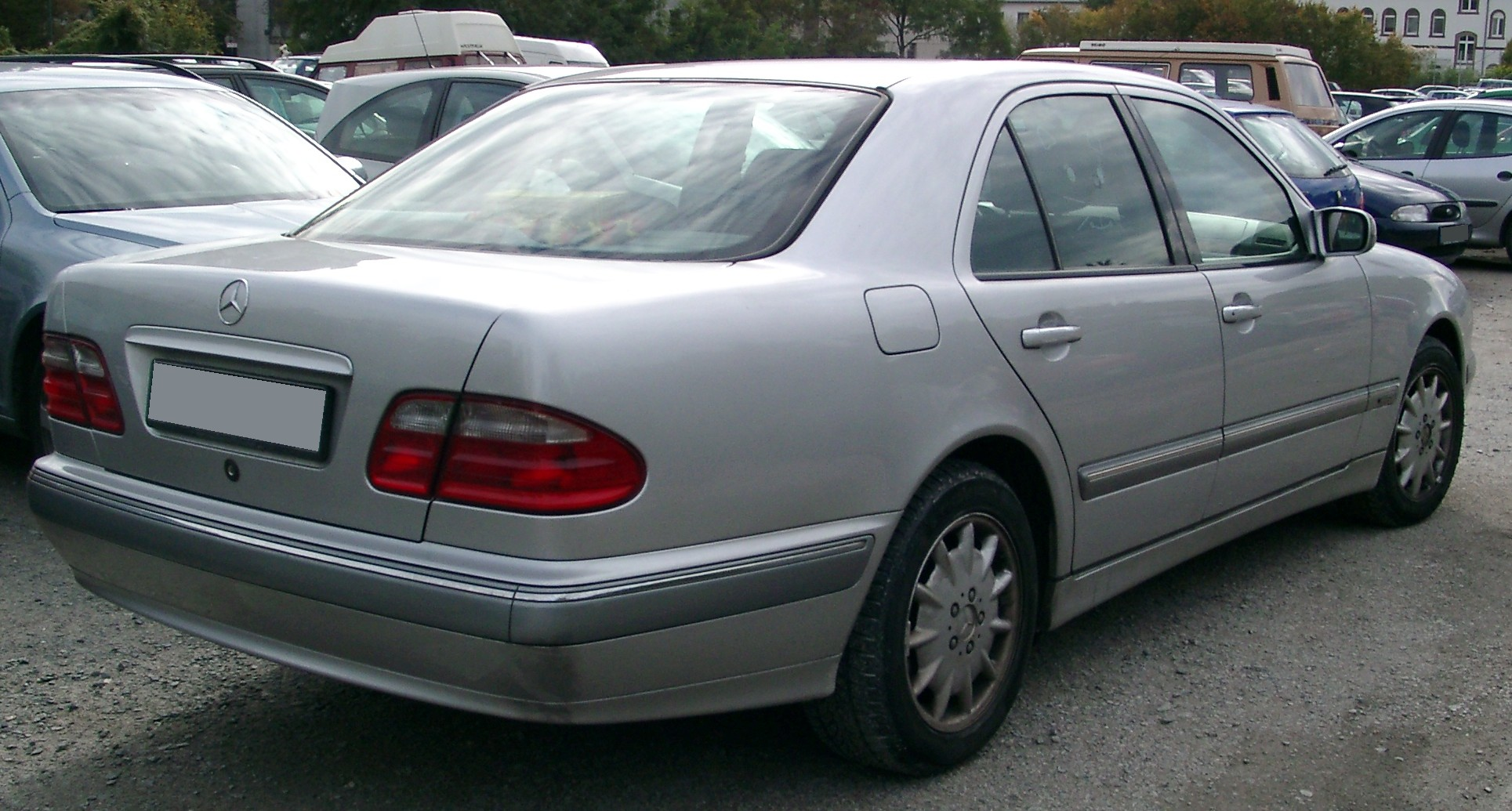
Rear view

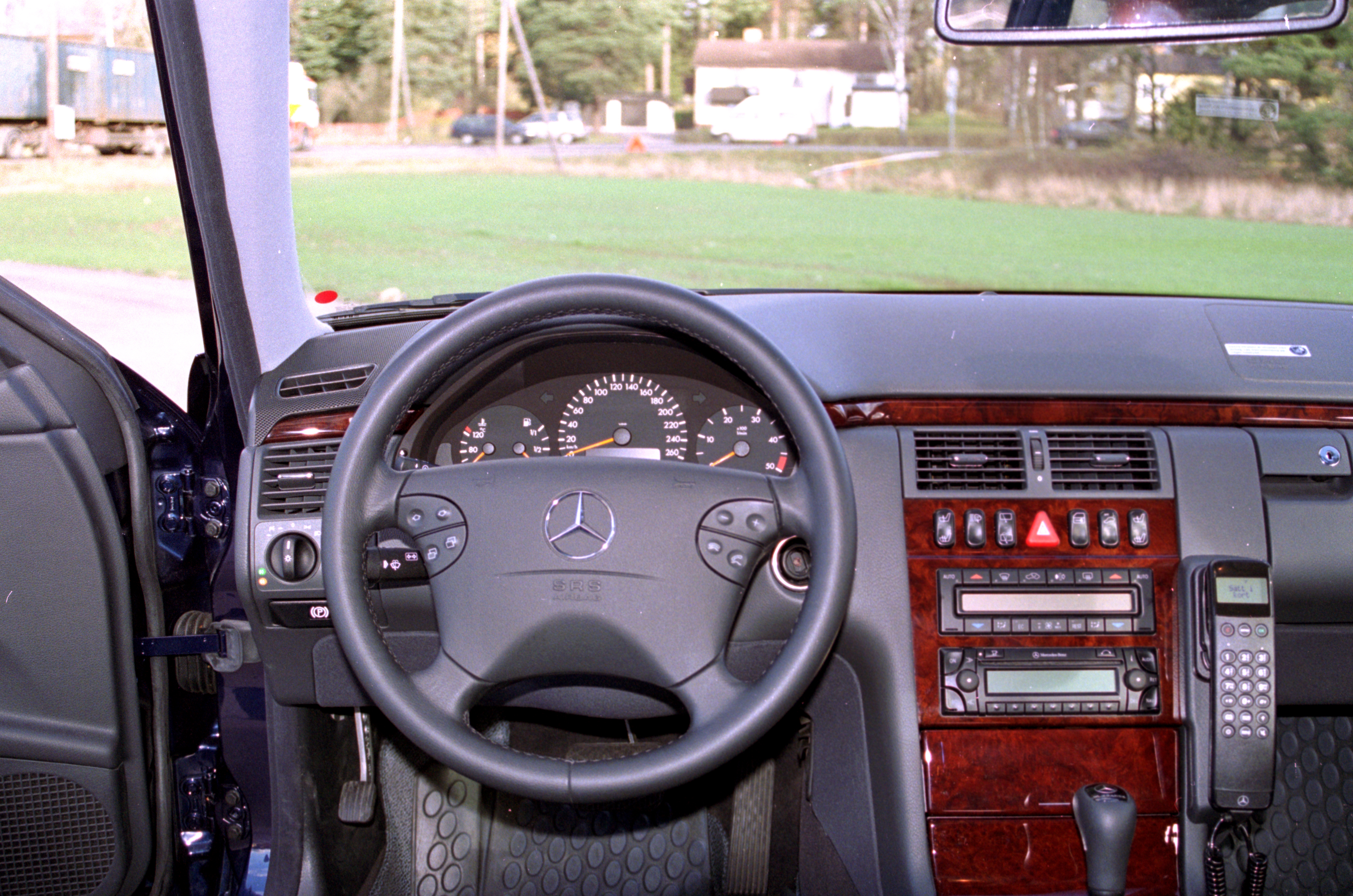
Elegance interior of an E 270 CDI estate

=== Avantgarde ===
Avantgarde was the sport-oriented equipment line. It used chrome trim, body-coloured rubbing strips, blue-tinted glass, a gloss-black grille insert, lowered suspension on rear-wheel-drive models, five-hole alloy wheels and xenon dipped-beam headlights with automatic range adjustment and headlamp washers. The interior used “Tiffany” cloth and dark bird’s-eye maple trim.

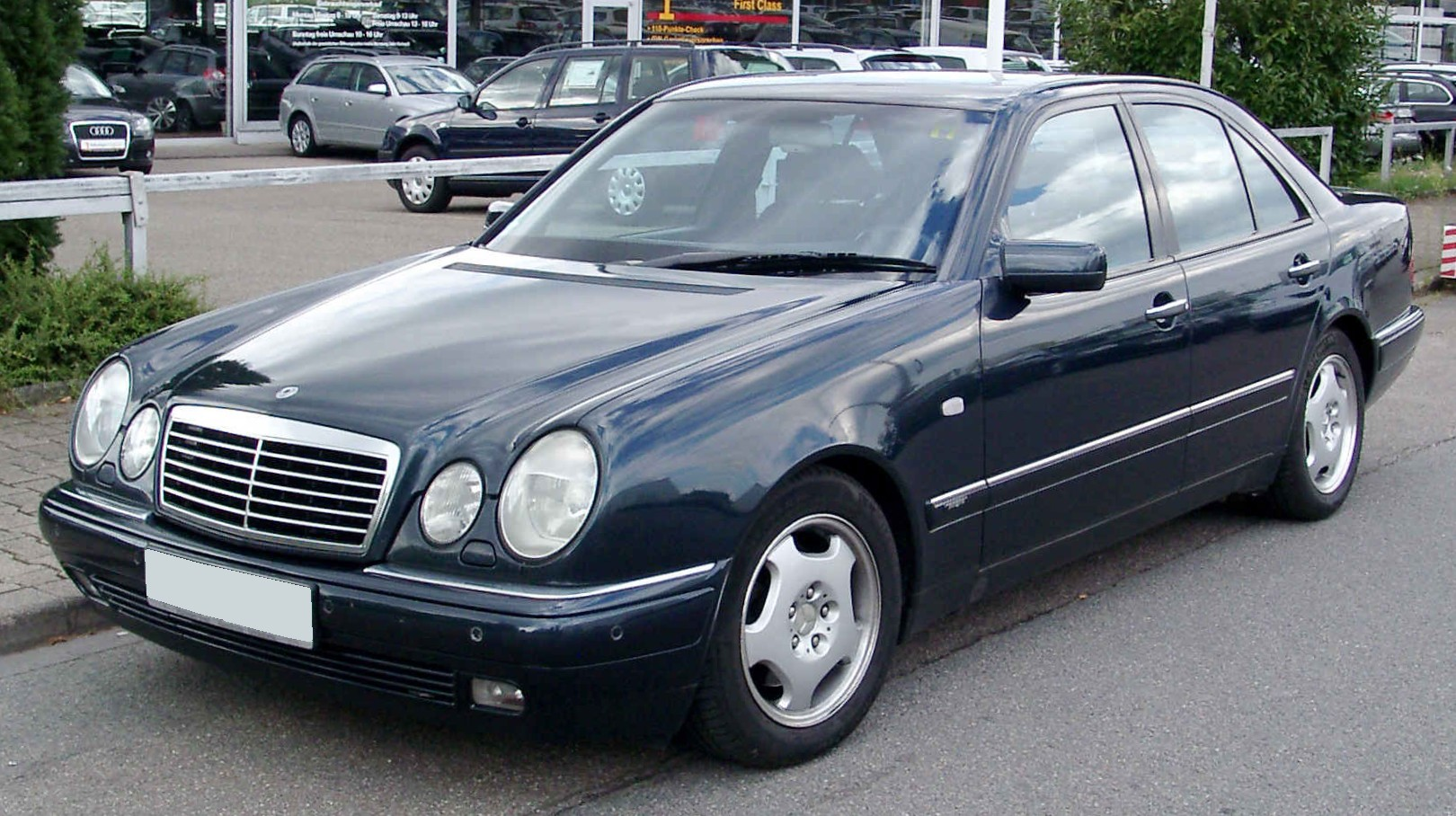
W 210 Avantgarde (1995–1999)

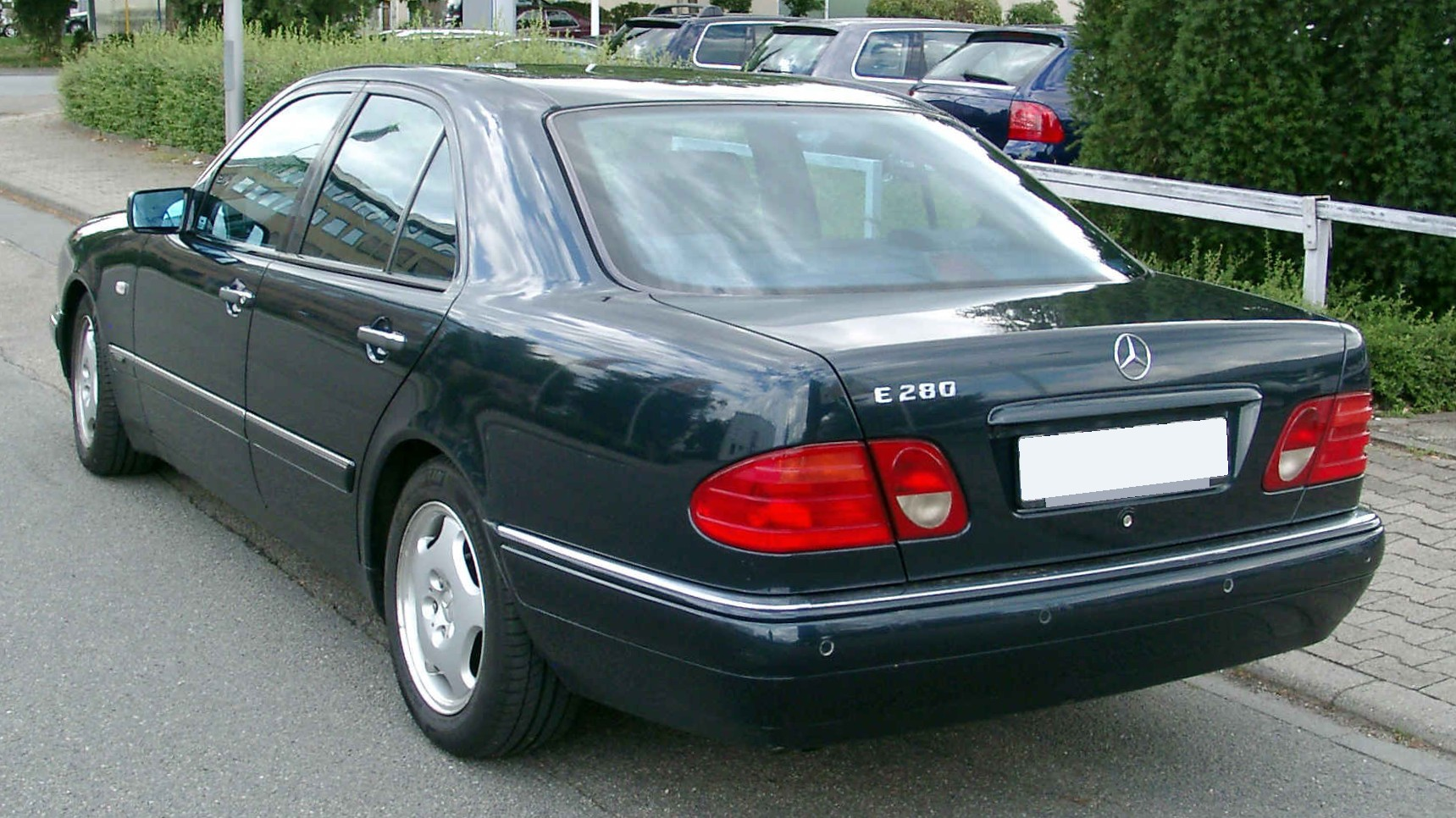
Rear view

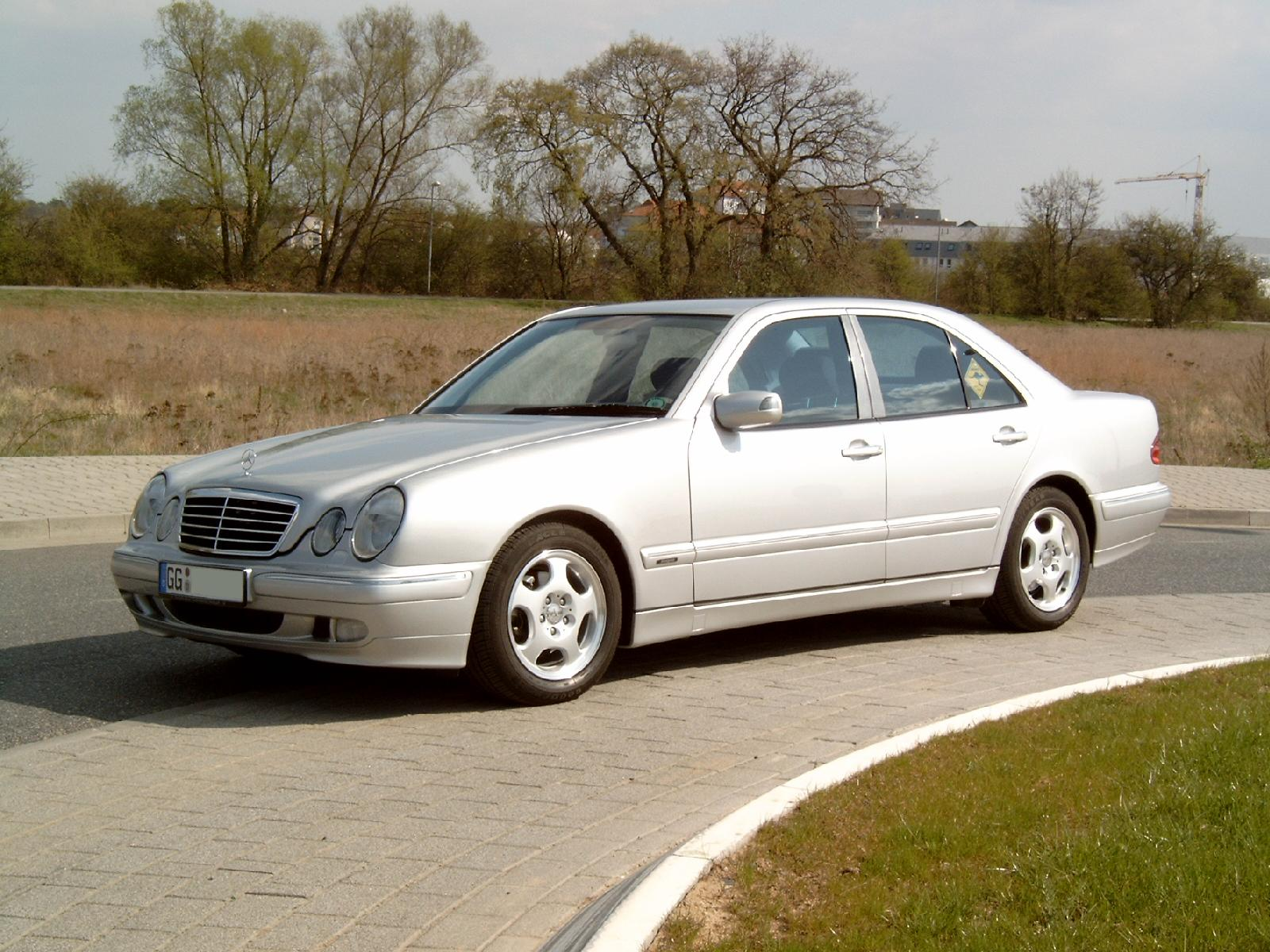
E 200 Kompressor Avantgarde (1999–2002)

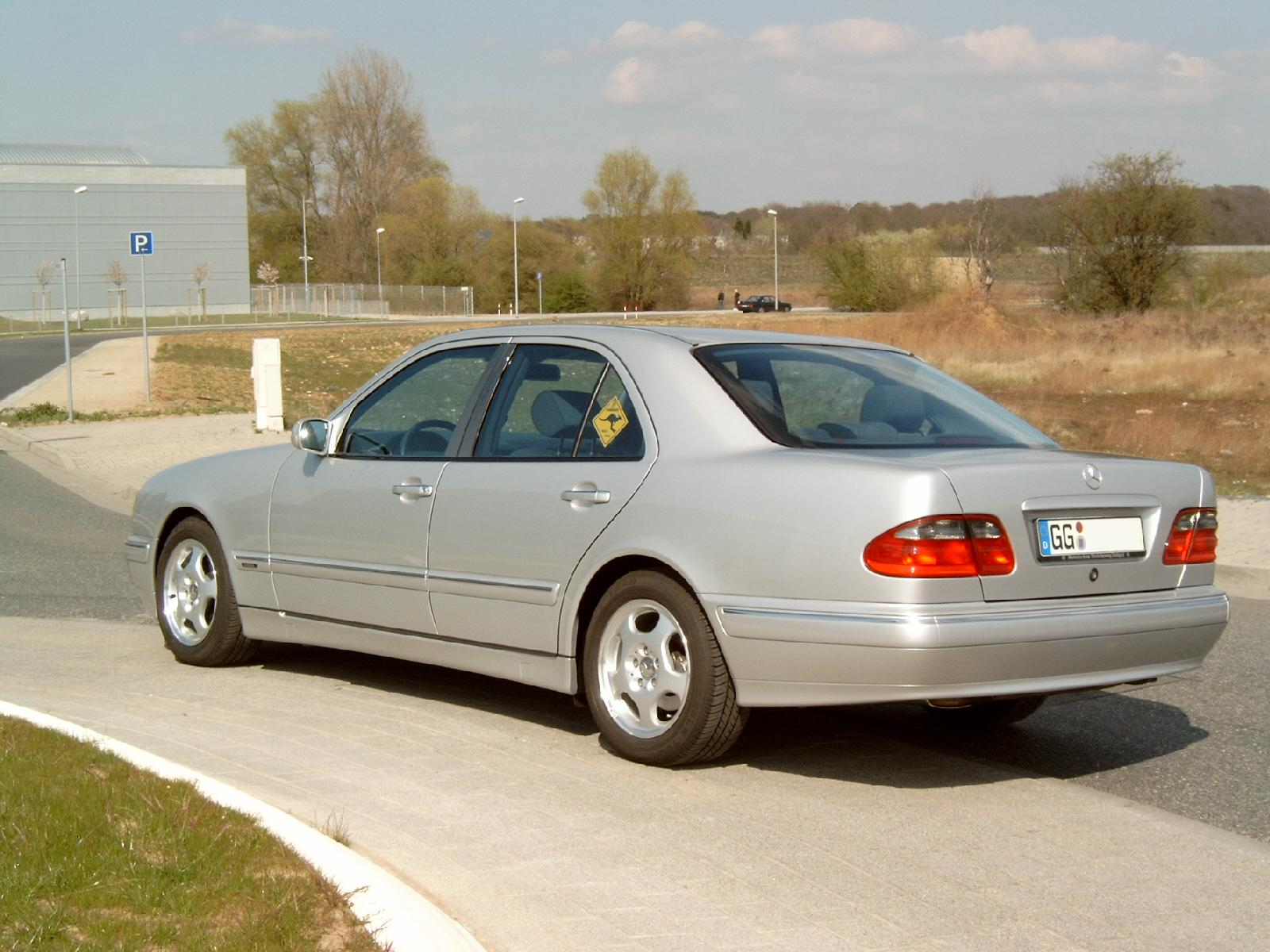
Rear view

=== AMG ===
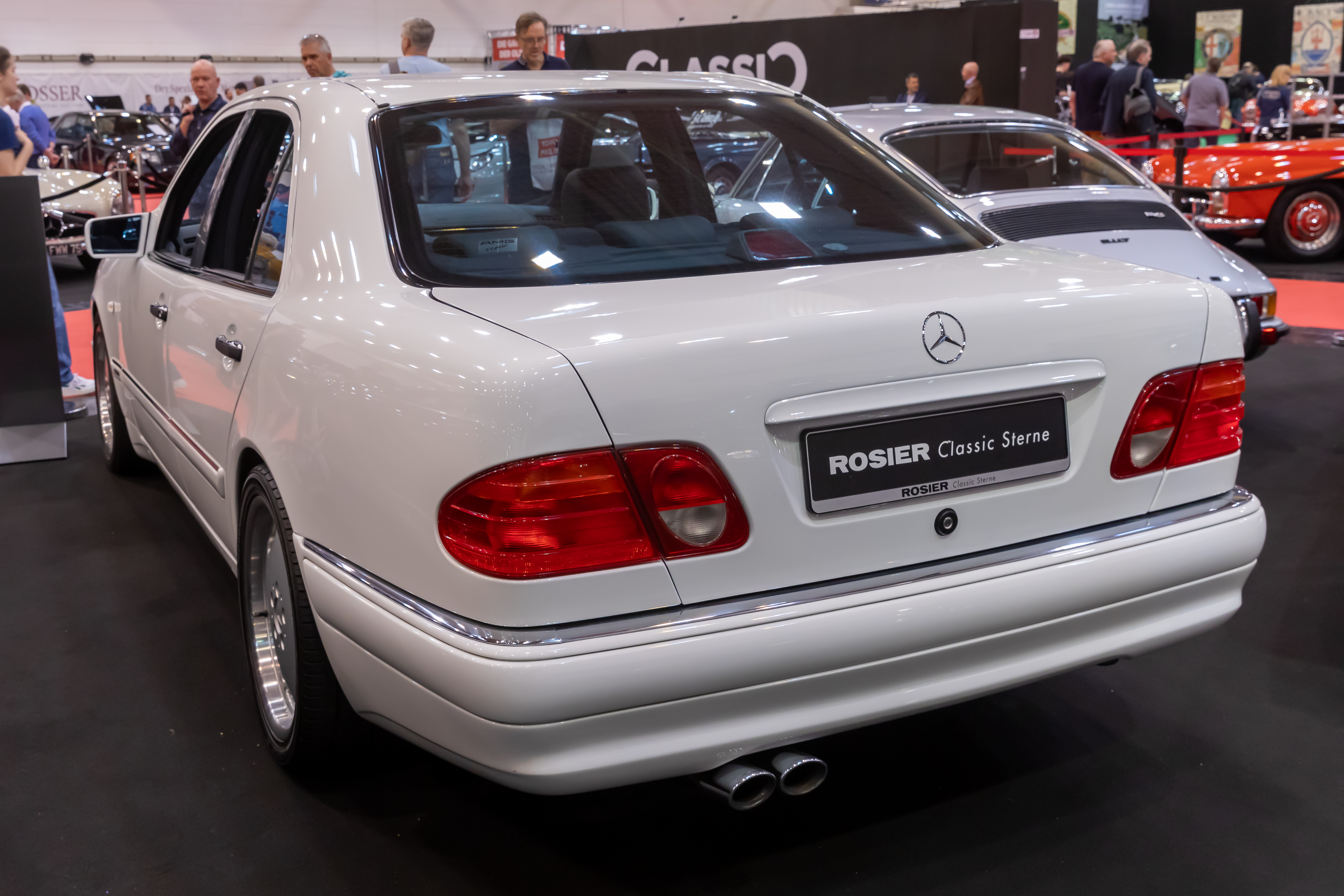
E 60 AMG (1996–1998)

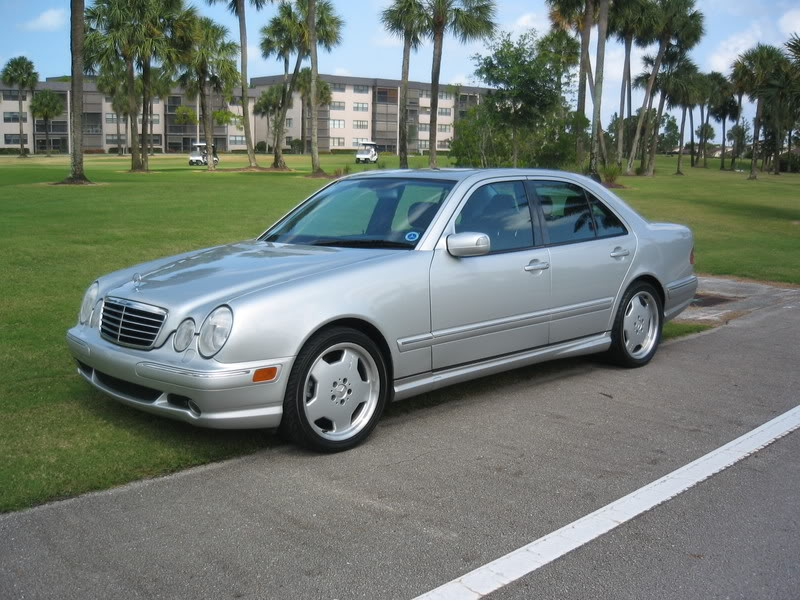
E 55 AMG (1999–2002)

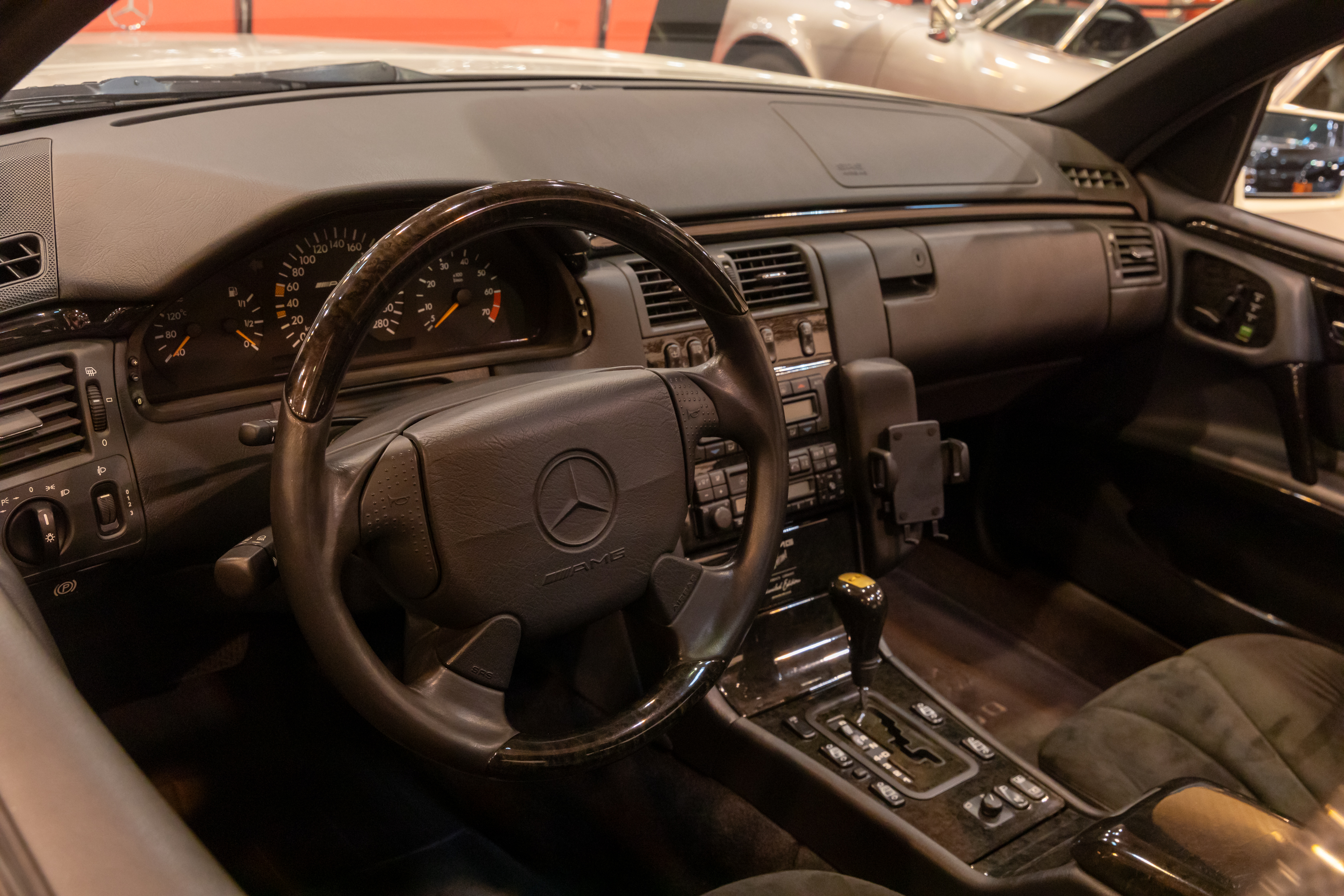
Interior of an E 60 AMG with sports steering wheel

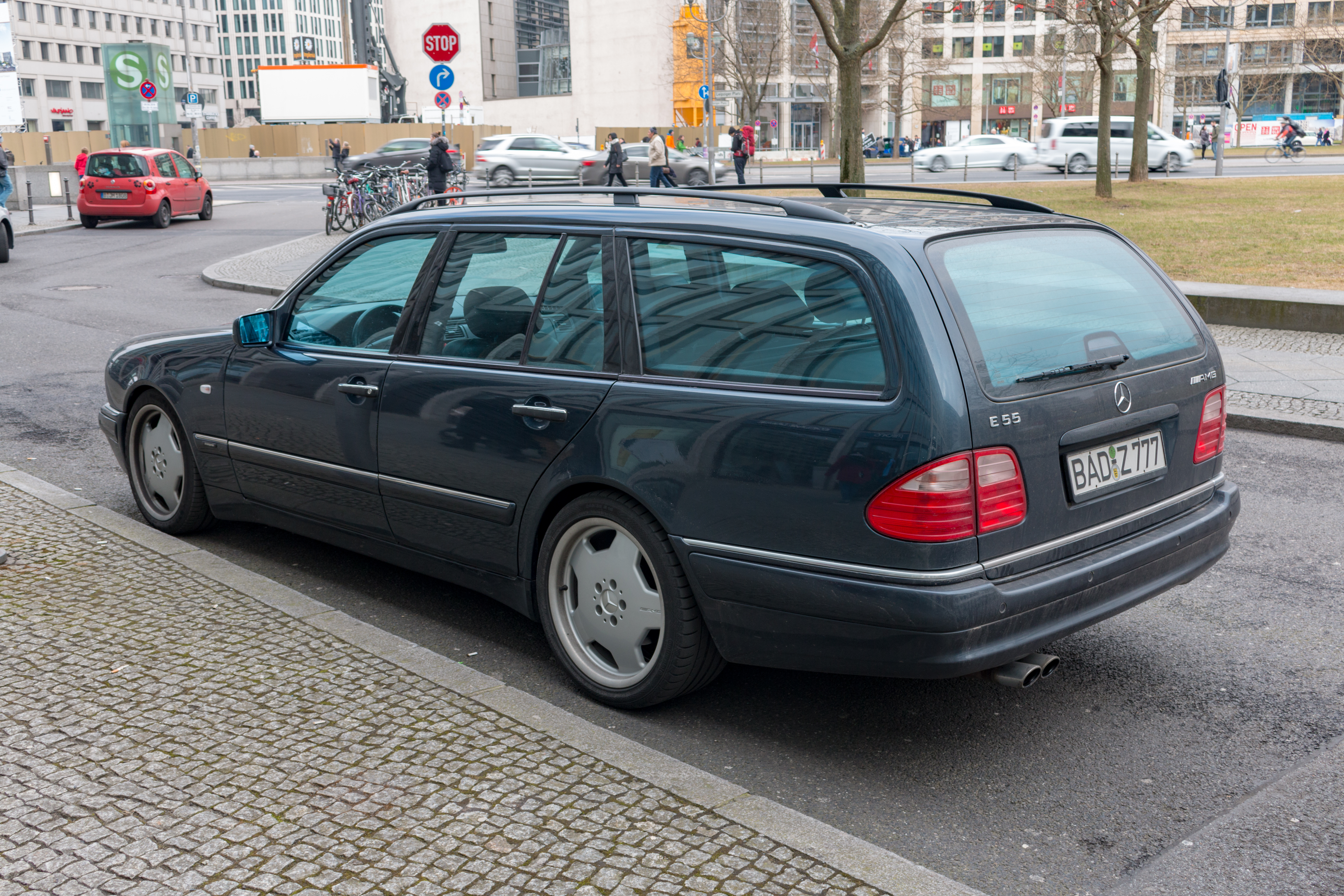
E 55 AMG estate

AMG models were based on Avantgarde and added AMG bumpers, side skirts, exhaust system, sports suspension, AMG wheels, 235/40 R18 front and 265/35 R18 rear tyres, heated leather sports seats with memory, AMG steering wheel, AMG selector and a modified instrument cluster. The E 50 AMG was introduced in February 1996. The E 36 AMG and E 60 AMG were available in small numbers. The E 55 AMG replaced the earlier AMG versions in 1997 and was offered as saloon and estate. AMG also built 4MATIC versions on request.

The E 36 AMG was a European-market derivative based on the E 280. The E 50 AMG was produced in 1996–1997 and was not offered in the United States. The E 55 AMG used the M113 V8 and continued through the facelift period. AMG technical specifications included double-wishbone front suspension, multi-link rear suspension, two-piece front brake rotors, AMG Monoblock wheels and staggered tyre sizes.

==== Additional AMG market and specification notes ====
The E 36 AMG was a European-specification model based on the E 280 and produced in 1996 and 1997; the Australian-market figure was 49 units. The E 50 AMG was a European-specification 1996–1997 model not offered in the United States, with production stated at approximately 2,870 units. W210 E 55 AMG production was stated at approximately 12,000 units, with around 500 per year imported into North America.

AMG assembly involved Affalterbach and Bremen until the end of 2001. AMG equipment and options included AMG body styling, AMG Monoblock staggered 18-inch wheels, AMG brakes, AMG sport suspension, heated multicontour AMG sport seats, COMAND navigation, Bose premium sound, Tele-Aid, ventilated seats, voice control and built-in telephone, with several of these items standard in North America.

The 2001 model year E 55 AMG had 653 units produced, a 5.5-litre V8 producing 354 hp and 391 lb⋅ft of torque, and road-test 0–60 mph ranges of 4.8–5.3 seconds.

Common AMG technical specifications included front independent double-wishbone suspension, rear five-arm multilink suspension, hydraulic dual-circuit brakes with vacuum servo assistance, two-piece front floating rotors, two-piston front floating calipers, rack-and-pinion steering with speed-sensitive power assistance and a curb-to-curb turning circle of 37.2 ft (11.3 m).

=== Tuning models ===
During the W210 production period, tuning conversions were offered by companies including Brabus, Lorinser, Carlsson, Mansory and Renntech. The Brabus E V12 used a 7.3-litre V12 engine and represented a major conversion of the model.

== Engines and transmissions ==
In North America, the W210 range included naturally aspirated and turbocharged 3.0-litre OM606 inline-six diesel models. Diesel E-Class sales in North America ended after the 1999 model year and resumed with the later W211 E 320 CDI. The E 55 AMG estate was not offered in the North American market.

The W210 was offered with petrol and diesel engines. At the start of production, most engines were known from earlier Mercedes-Benz model ranges or were further developments of those engines. During production, the engine range was progressively replaced by newer units, including M112 and M113 petrol engines and OM611, OM612 and OM613 common-rail diesels. The 4MATIC all-wheel-drive system was added later in production.

The W210 used five-speed manual, six-speed manual, four-speed automatic and five-speed automatic transmissions. The four-speed automatic and earlier five-speed automatic units were carried over from the W124 range. For model year 1997, the electronically controlled 722.6 five-speed automatic replaced earlier automatic transmissions on many models. After the 1999 facelift, engines up to 2.8 litres received a six-speed manual gearbox, and the five-speed automatic used Touch Shift manual selection.

=== Petrol engines ===
The four-cylinder petrol engines belonged to the M111 family. The E 200 and E 230 used an aluminium cylinder head, cast-iron block, four valves per cylinder, chain-driven overhead camshafts, hot-film air-mass measurement and variable intake camshaft timing. Export E 200 Kompressor versions used a supercharged M111. From mid-2000, four-cylinder models were replaced by the M111 EVO-based E 200 Kompressor; more than 150 components were changed compared with the previous M111.

The early E 280 and E 320 used the M104 inline-six. In 1997, these engines were replaced by the M112 V6, which used a 90-degree V angle, aluminium block and cylinder heads, three valves per cylinder and two spark plugs per cylinder. The M119 V8 powered the E 420 and earlier AMG versions. The M113 V8 replaced it in the E 430 and E 55 AMG.

=== Diesel engines ===
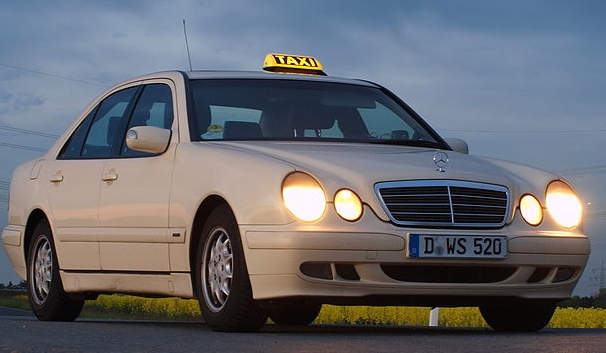
Mercedes-Benz W 210 as a taxi

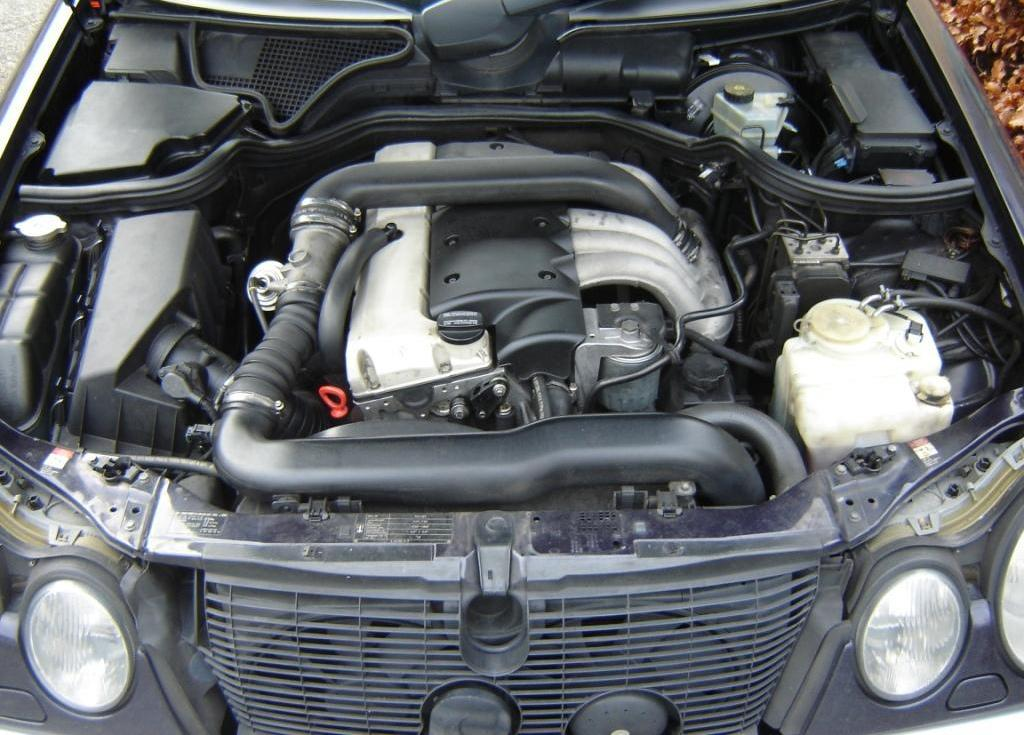
OM 602 engine in the E 290 Turbodiesel

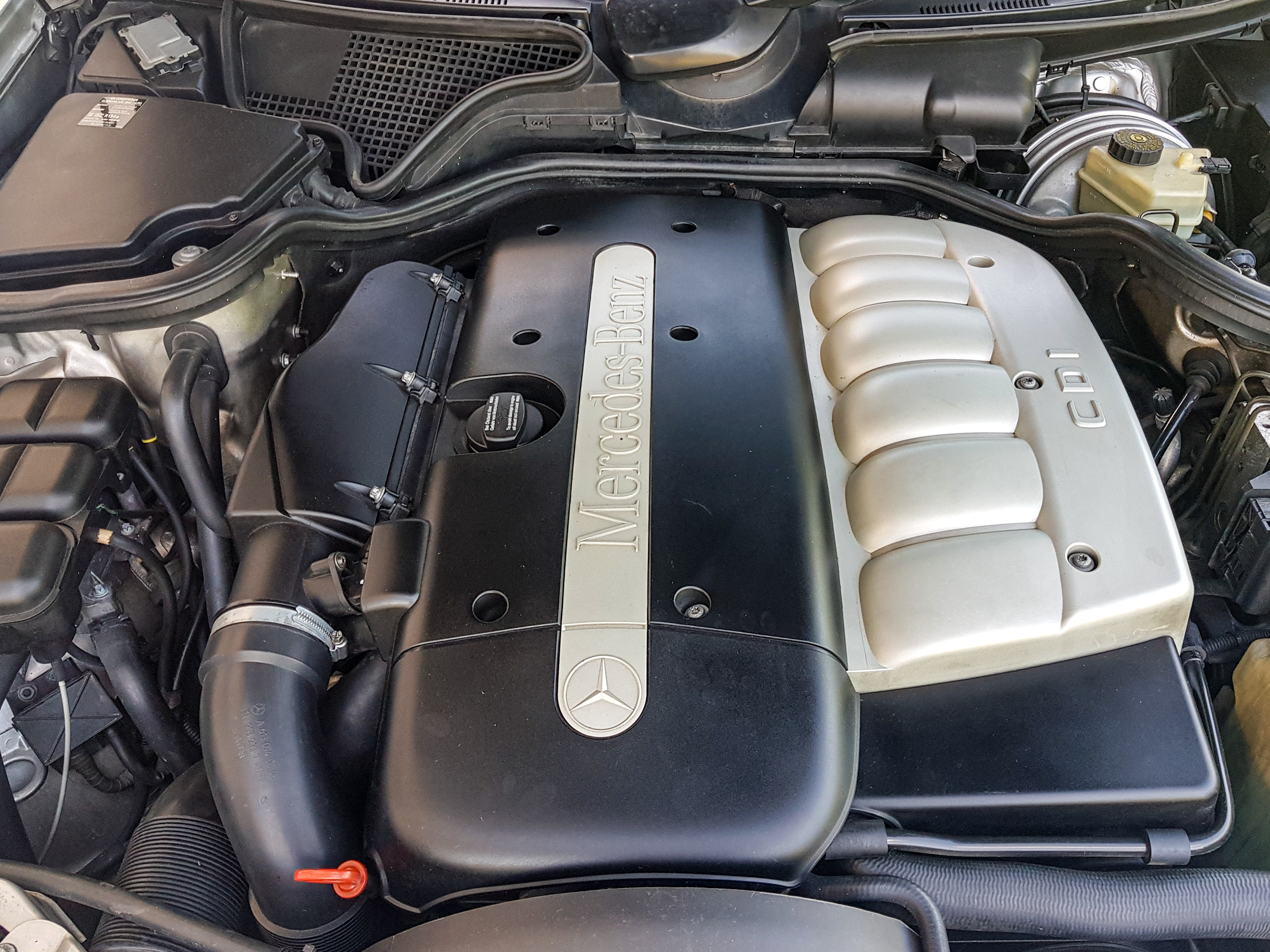
OM 613 engine in the E 320 CDI

The OM604 powered the E 220 Diesel and Portuguese-market E 200 Diesel. The OM611 common-rail diesel appeared in June 1998 as the E 200 CDI and E 220 CDI. The E 290 Turbodiesel used the OM602 DE 29 LA, the first Mercedes-Benz passenger-car diesel with direct injection but without common rail. Export-market E 250 Diesel and E 250 Turbodiesel models used the OM605. The facelift introduced the OM612 E 270 CDI and OM613 E 320 CDI.

=== Transmissions ===
The W210 carried over the 4-speed 722.3 and 722.4 automatic transmissions and the optional 722.5 5-speed automatic from the W124 generation. For the 1997 model year, Mercedes-Benz introduced the electronically controlled 722.6 5-speed automatic transmission, replacing the previous automatic transmissions.

A five-speed manual transmission was also available. After the 1999 facelift, the five-speed manual was replaced by a six-speed manual on engines up to 2.8 litres. The five-speed automatic was marketed as having a "sealed for life" filling, although later service practice recommended fluid changes at regular intervals.

Technical data

==== Petrol engines ====
Specification	E 200			E 200 Kompressor						E 230	E 240			E 280				E 280 4MATIC		E 320			E 320 4MATIC		E 420	E 430		E 430 4MATIC	E 36 AMG	E 50 AMG	E 50 AMG T	E 55 AMG	E 55 AMG 4MATIC	E 60 AMG	E 60 AMG 6.3
Production period	05/1995–05/1996	06/1996–07/1999	07/1999–06/2000	06/1995–07/1996	08/1997–07/1999	07/1999–06/2000	08/1997–07/1999	07/1999–06/2000	05/2000–03/2002; T-model: 05/2000–12/2002	05/1995–06/1998; T-model: 04/1996–06/1998	08/1997–07/1999	07/1999–05/2000	05/2000–03/2002; T-model: 05/2000–12/2002	12/1995–03/1997	03/1997–07/1999	07/1999–06/2000	06/2000–03/2002; T-model: 06/2000–12/2002	02/1997–07/1999	07/1999–03/2002; T-model: 07/1999–12/2002	05/1995–03/1997	03/1997–07/1999; T-model: 02/1997–07/1999	07/1999–03/2002; T-model: 07/1999–12/2002	02/1997–07/1999; T-model: 06/1997–07/1999	07/1999–03/2002; T-model: 07/1999–12/2002	02/1996–02/1998; T-model: 04/1996–09/1997	08/1997–07/1999	07/1999–03/2002; T-model: 07/1999–12/2002	07/1999–03/2002; T-model: 07/1999–12/2002	12/1995–03/1997	01/1996–08/1997	04/1996–09/1997	10/1997–03/2002; T-model: 10/1997–12/2002	07/1999–03/2002; T-model: 07/1999–12/2002	1996–1998	1996–1998
Engine data
Engine designation *	M 111 E 20	M 111 E 20	M 111 E 20	M 111 E 20 ML	M 111 E 20 ML	M 111 E 20 ML	M 111 E 20 ML	M 111 E 20 ML	M 111 E 20 ML EVO	M 111 E 23	M 112 E 24	M 112 E 24	M 112 E 26	M 104 E 28	M 112 E 28	M 112 E 28	M 112 E 28	M 112 E 28	M 112 E 28	M 104 E 32	M 112 E 32	M 112 E 32	M 112 E 32	M 112 E 32	M 119 E 42	M 113 E 43	M 113 E 43	M 113 E 43	M 104 E 36	M 119 E 50	M 119 E 50	M 113 E 55	M 113 E 55	M 119 E 60	M 119 E 60
Engine type	R4	R4	R4	R4	R4	R4	R4	R4	R4	R4	V6	V6	V6	R6	V6	V6	V6	V6	V6	R6	V6	V6	V6	V6	V8	V8	V8	V8	R6	V8	V8	V8	V8	V8	V8
Displacement in cm³	1998	1998	1998	1998	1998	1998	1998	1998	1998	2295	2398	2398	2597	2799	2799	2799	2799	2799	2799	3199	3199	3199	3199	3199	4196	4266	4266	4266	3606	4973	4973	5439	5439	5956	6298
Maximum power in kW (hp)	100 kW (134 hp) at 5500	100 kW (134 hp) at 5500	100 kW (134 hp) at 5500	132 kW (177 hp) at 5400	137 kW (184 hp) at 5300	137 kW (184 hp) at 5300	141 kW (189 hp) at 5300	141 kW (189 hp) at 5300	120 kW (161 hp) at 5300	110 kW (148 hp) at 5400	125 kW (168 hp) at 5900	125 kW (168 hp) at 5900	125 kW (168 hp) at 5500	142 kW (190 hp) at 5500	150 kW (201 hp) at 5700	150 kW (201 hp) at 5700	150 kW (201 hp) at 5700	150 kW (201 hp) at 5700	150 kW (201 hp) at 5700	162 kW (217 hp) at 5500	165 kW (221 hp) at 5600	165 kW (221 hp) at 5600	165 kW (221 hp) at 5600	165 kW (221 hp) at 5600	205 kW (275 hp) at 5700	205 kW (275 hp) at 5750	205 kW (275 hp) at 5750	205 kW (275 hp) at 5750	206 kW (276 hp) at 5750	255 kW (342 hp) at 5750	255 kW (342 hp) at 5750	260 kW (349 hp) at 5500	260 kW (349 hp) at 5500	280 kW (375 hp) at 5500	298 kW (400 hp) at 5500
Maximum torque in N⋅m (lb⋅ft)	190 N⋅m (140 lb⋅ft) at 4000	190 N⋅m (140 lb⋅ft) at 3700–4500	190 N⋅m (140 lb⋅ft) at 3700–4500	250 N⋅m (184 lb⋅ft) at 2500–4800	260 N⋅m (192 lb⋅ft) at 2500–4800	260 N⋅m (192 lb⋅ft) at 2500–4800	270 N⋅m (199 lb⋅ft) at 2500–4800	270 N⋅m (199 lb⋅ft) at 2500–4800	230 N⋅m (170 lb⋅ft) at 2500–4800	220 N⋅m (162 lb⋅ft) at 3700–4500	225 N⋅m (166 lb⋅ft) at 3000–5000	225 N⋅m (166 lb⋅ft) at 3000–5000	240 N⋅m (177 lb⋅ft) at 4500	270 N⋅m (199 lb⋅ft) at 3750	270 N⋅m (199 lb⋅ft) at 3000–5000	270 N⋅m (199 lb⋅ft) at 3000–5000	270 N⋅m (199 lb⋅ft) at 3000–5000	270 N⋅m (199 lb⋅ft) at 3000–5000	270 N⋅m (199 lb⋅ft) at 3000–5000	315 N⋅m (232 lb⋅ft) at 3850	315 N⋅m (232 lb⋅ft) at 3000–4800	315 N⋅m (232 lb⋅ft) at 3000–4800	315 N⋅m (232 lb⋅ft) at 3000–4800	315 N⋅m (232 lb⋅ft) at 3000–4800	400 N⋅m (295 lb⋅ft) at 3900	400 N⋅m (295 lb⋅ft) at 3000–4000	400 N⋅m (295 lb⋅ft) at 3000–4000	400 N⋅m (295 lb⋅ft) at 3000–4000	385 N⋅m (284 lb⋅ft) at 4000–4750	480 N⋅m (354 lb⋅ft) at 3750–4250	480 N⋅m (354 lb⋅ft) at 3750–4250	530 N⋅m (391 lb⋅ft) at 3000	530 N⋅m (391 lb⋅ft) at 3000	580 N⋅m (428 lb⋅ft) at 3750	616 N⋅m (454 lb⋅ft) at 3600
Measured values
Top speed in km/h	205	205; T-model: 198	209; T-model: 198	—	231; T-model: 225	232; T-model: 223	231; T-model: 225	232; T-model: 223	222; T-model: 212	215; T-model: 208	223; T-model: 216	224; T-model: 215	229; T-model: 219	230	234	230; T-model: 225	230; T-model: 223	223; T-model: 210	223; T-model: 217	235	238; T-model: 230	238; T-model: 230	234; T-model: 228	234; T-model: 225	250 limited T-model: 245	250 limited T-model: 243	250 limited T-model: 243	250 limited T-model: 243	250 limited	250 limited	250 limited	250 limited	250 limited	250 limited	250 limited
Acceleration, 0–100 km/h in s	11.4	11.4; T-model: 12.2	10.8; T-model: 11.0	—	8.9; T-model: 9.1	9.5; T-model: 9.9	8.9; T-model: 9.1	9.5; T-model: 9.9	9.7; T-model: 10.1	10.5; T-model: 11.2	9.6; T-model: 10.5	9.8; T-model: 10.7	9.3; T-model: 9.5	8.6	8.5	8.9; T-model: 9.5	8.9; T-model: 9.2	9.1; T-model: 9.9	9.4; T-model: 10.2	7.8	7.7; T-model: 8.5	7.9; T-model: 8.7	8.0; T-model: 8.8	8.3; T-model: 9.2	7.0	6.6; T-model: 6.9	6.6; T-model: 6.9	6.8; T-model: 7.2	6.7	6.2	6.2	5.7; T-model: 5.9	5.8; T-model: 6.1	5.1; T-model: 5.6	5.0
Fuel consumption in l/100 km	9.1	9.1; T-model: 9.4	9.3; T-model: 9.6	—	9.9; T-model: 10.0	9.6; T-model: 10.0	9.9; T-model: 10.0	9.6; T-model: 10.0	8.9; T-model: 9.3	8.3; T-model: 9.5	10.3; T-model: 10.7	10.4; T-model: 11.2	10.8; T-model: 11.8	10.4	10.6	10.8; T-model: 11.3	10.8; T-model: 11.5	11.0; T-model: 11.2	11.2; T-model: 11.5	10.4	10.3; T-model: 10.6	10.3; T-model: 10.6	11.1; T-model: 11.3	11.1; T-model: 11.5	10.6	11.3; T-model: 12.1	10.8; T-model: 11.4	12.3; T-model: 12.9	—	11.6	—	12.1	— T-model: 13.2	—	—

==== Diesel engines ====
Specification	E 200 Diesel	E 200 CDI		E 220 Diesel	E 220 CDI		E 250 Diesel	E 250 Turbodiesel	E 270 CDI	E 290 Turbodiesel	E 300 Diesel	E 300 Turbodiesel	E 320 CDI
Production period	06/1996–07/1998	06/1998–06/1999	07/1999–03/2002	05/1995–07/1998	06/1998–06/1999	07/1999–03/2002; T-model: 07/1999–12/2002	06/1995–06/1998; T-model: 05/1996–06/1998	04/1997–07/1999; T-model: 09/1997–06/1999	07/1999–03/2002; T-model: 07/1999–12/2002	02/1996–06/1999; T-model: 05/1996–06/1999	05/1995–04/1997	04/1997–06/1999	07/1999–03/2002; T-model: 07/1999–12/2002
Engine data
Engine designation *	OM 604 D 20	OM 611 DE 22 LA red.	OM 611 DE 22 LA red.	OM 604 D 22	OM 611 DE 22 LA	OM 611 DE 22 LA	OM 605 D 25	OM 605 D 25 LA	OM 612 DE 27 LA	OM 602 DE 29 LA	OM 606 D 30	OM 606 D 30 LA	OM 613 DE 32 LA
Engine type	R4	R4	R4	R4	R4	R4	R5	R5	R5	R5	R6	R6	R6
Displacement in cm³	1997	2151	2148	2155	2151	2148	2497	2497	2685	2874	2996	2996	3222
Maximum power in kW (hp)	65 kW (87 hp) at 5000	75 kW (101 hp) at 4200	85 kW (114 hp) at 4200	70 kW (94 hp) at 5000	92 kW (123 hp) at 4200	105 kW (141 hp) at 4200	83 kW (111 hp) at 5000	110 kW (148 hp) at 4400	125 kW (168 hp) at 4200	95 kW (127 hp) at 4000	100 kW (134 hp) at 5000	130 kW (174 hp) at 4400	145 kW (194 hp) at 4200
Maximum torque in N⋅m (lb⋅ft)	135 N⋅m (100 lb⋅ft) at 2000	235 N⋅m (173 lb⋅ft) at 1500–2600	250 N⋅m (184 lb⋅ft) at 1400–2600	150 N⋅m (111 lb⋅ft) at 3100	300 N⋅m (221 lb⋅ft) at 1800–2600	315 N⋅m (232 lb⋅ft) at 1800–2600	170 N⋅m (125 lb⋅ft) at 3200	280 N⋅m (207 lb⋅ft) at 1800–3600	370 N⋅m (273 lb⋅ft) at 1600–2800 (400 N⋅m (295 lb⋅ft) at 1800–2600 with automatic)	300 N⋅m (221 lb⋅ft) at 1800	210 N⋅m (155 lb⋅ft) at 2200	330 N⋅m (243 lb⋅ft) at 1600–3600	470 N⋅m (347 lb⋅ft) at 1800–2600
Measured values
Top speed in km/h	177	187	199	180	200; T-model: 193	213; T-model: 205	193; T-model: 185	206; T-model: 203	225; T-model: 213	195; T-model: 190	205	220; T-model: 215	230; T-model: 227
Acceleration, 0–100 km/h in s	17.6	13.7	12.5	17.0	11.2; T-model: 11.7	10.4; T-model: 10.9	15.3; T-model: 16.2	10.4; T-model: 11.3	9.0; T-model: 9.5	11.5; T-model: 12.2	12.9	8.9; T-model: 9.4	8.3; T-model: 8.8
Fuel consumption in l/100 km	7.6	6.3	6.2	6.6	6.3; T-model: 6.7	6.2	7.0; T-model: 8.6	8.0; T-model: 8.3	6.9; T-model: 7.1	6.8; T-model: 7.2	7.4	7.9; T-model: 8.6	7.8; T-model: 7.9

Values marked “T-model” are estate figures where they differ from the saloon. An em dash indicates that no value was available in the source data.
* The engine designation is coded as follows:
M = petrol engine, OM = diesel engine, series = three-digit engine family, E = intake-manifold injection, D/DE = direct injection, displacement = rounded decilitres, L = charge-air cooling, A = turbocharger, ML = supercharger, EVO = evolution, red. = reduced output.

=== 4MATIC all-wheel drive ===
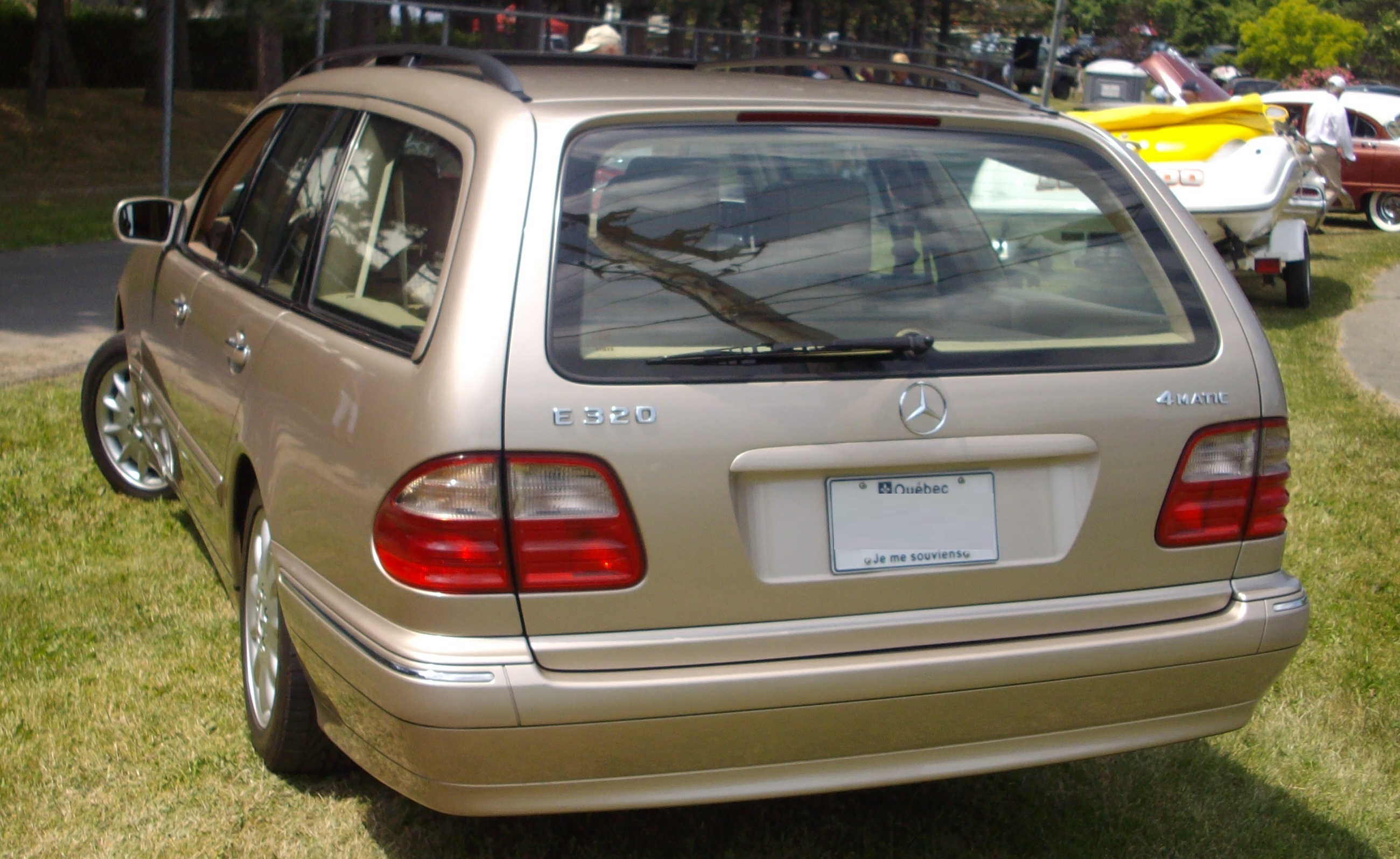
E 320 4MATIC estate (1999–2003)

From 1997, the W210 was available with 4MATIC all-wheel drive. Compared with the W124 4MATIC system, the W210 system was redesigned and combined permanent all-wheel drive with the Electronic Traction System. Conventional differential locks were no longer used. The 4MATIC models were developed and built together with Steyr-Daimler-Puch Fahrzeugtechnik GmbH in Graz. Initially, the system was offered on the E 280 4MATIC, followed later by the E 320 4MATIC and E 430 4MATIC. AMG built a small number of E 55 AMG 4MATIC models based on the E 430 4MATIC. The system was available for both saloon and estate versions.

The redesigned W210 4MATIC system used three open differentials at the front, centre and rear rather than the clutches and couplings used in the earlier W124 system. The front suspension design on 4MATIC models differed from rear-wheel-drive models, making some replacement parts, including shock absorbers, model-specific.

== Wheels ==
The W210 was offered with several original wheel configurations:

- E 200, E 220 CDI, E 230, pre-facelift E 240 and E 300 Diesel: 15 × 6.5 in, ET37.
- E 200 Kompressor, E 240, E 280, E 320 and E 420: 16 × 7.5 in, ET41.
- E 430: 16 × 7.5 in, ET41 before 2000; 17 × 7.5 in, ET41 after 2000.
- Sport Package: 17 × 8 in, ET37.
- Special Edition: 17 × 8 in, ET35.
- E 55 AMG: 18 × 8 in, ET31 front and 18 × 9 in, ET35 rear.

The bolt pattern is 5×112 with 12 mm × 1.5 wheel bolts.

== Safety ==
Stars in the Euro NCAP crash test

The W210 received a four-star Euro NCAP rating in the 1998 test.

ANCAP test results Mercedes-Benz E-Class E200 saloon (2001)
Test	Score
Overall	4 /5 stars
Frontal offset	10.36/16
Side impact	13.33/16
Pole	2/2
Seat belt reminders	0/3
Whiplash protection	Not assessed
Pedestrian protection	Marginal
Electronic stability control	Not assessed

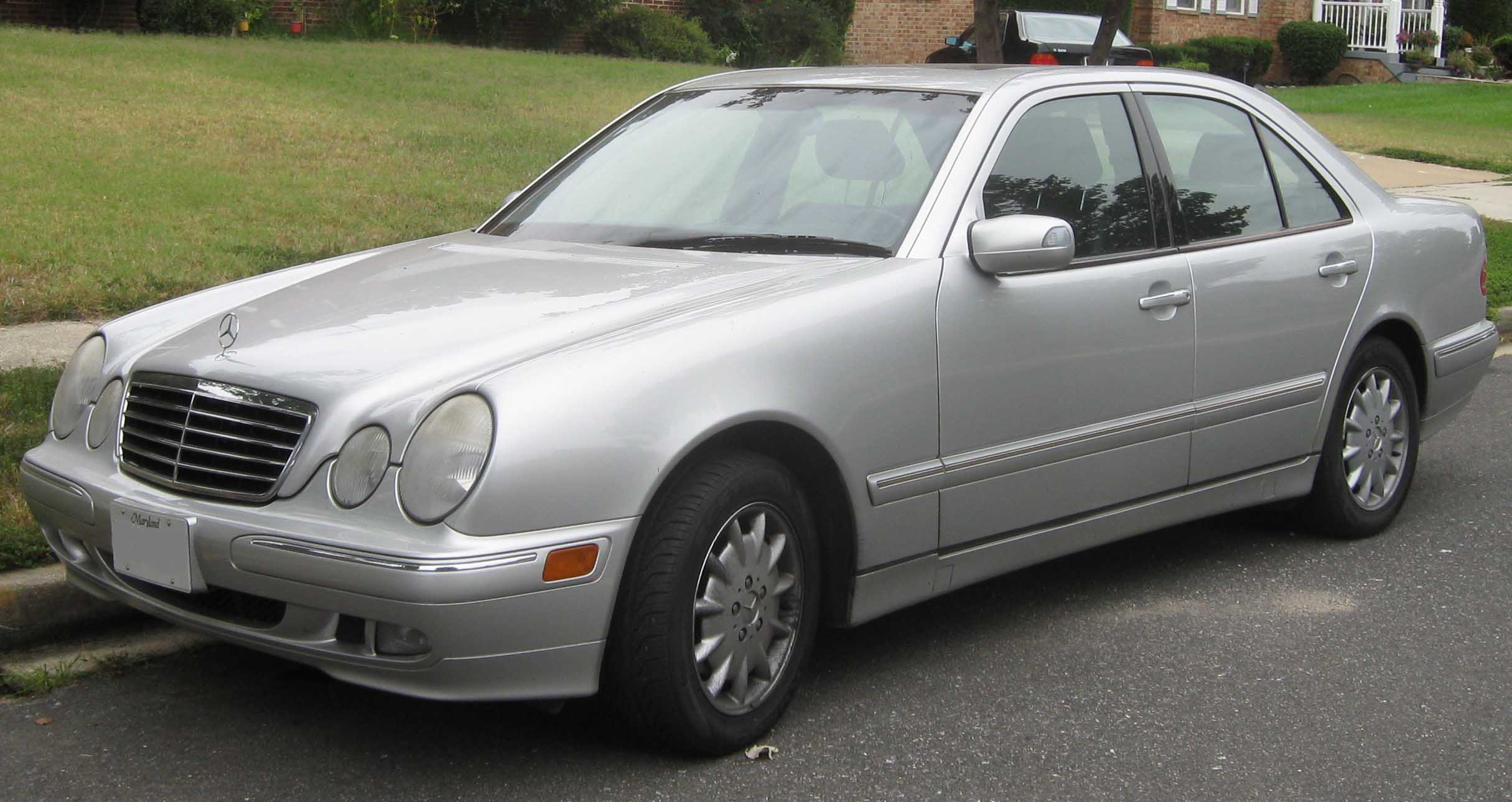
Facelift saloon

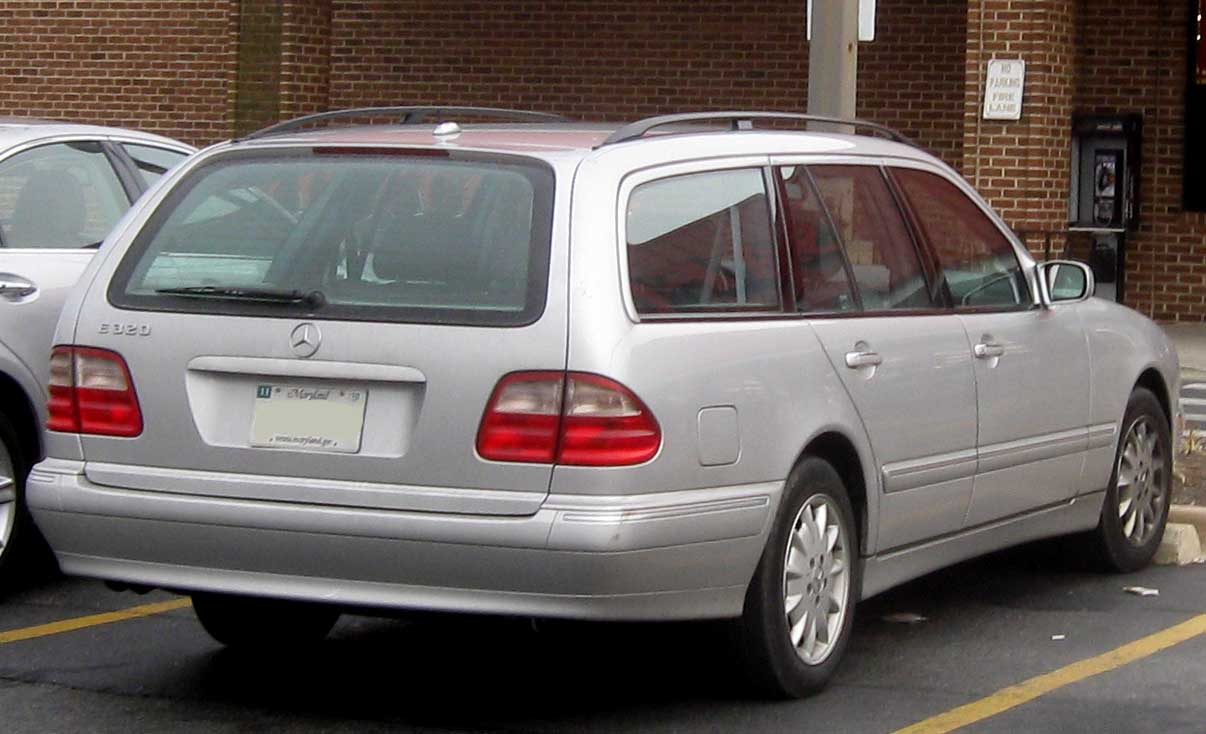
Facelift estate

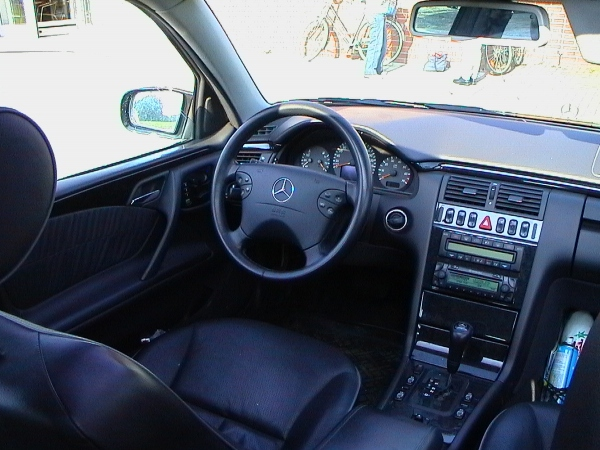
Facelift interior

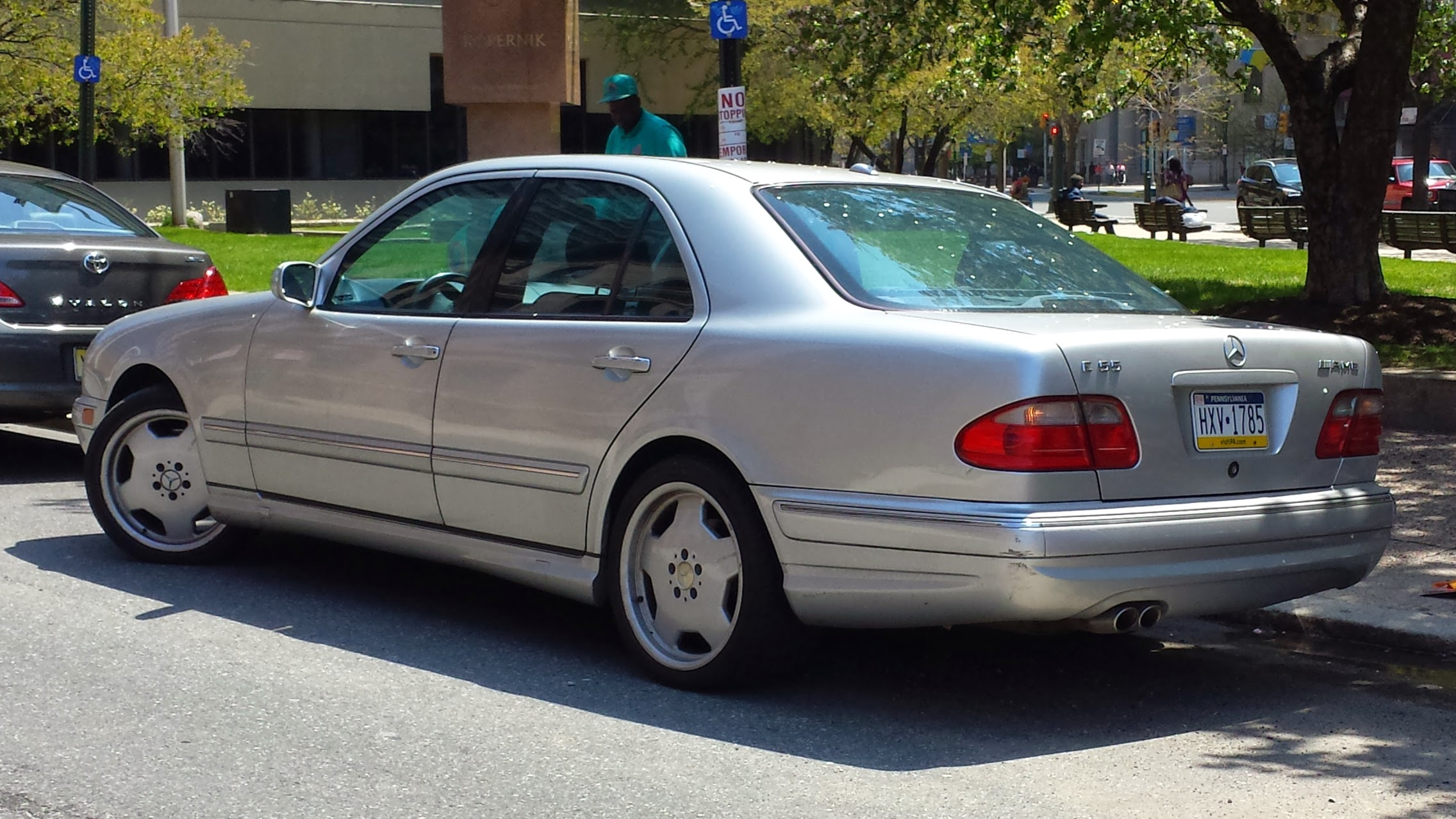
E 55 AMG rear view

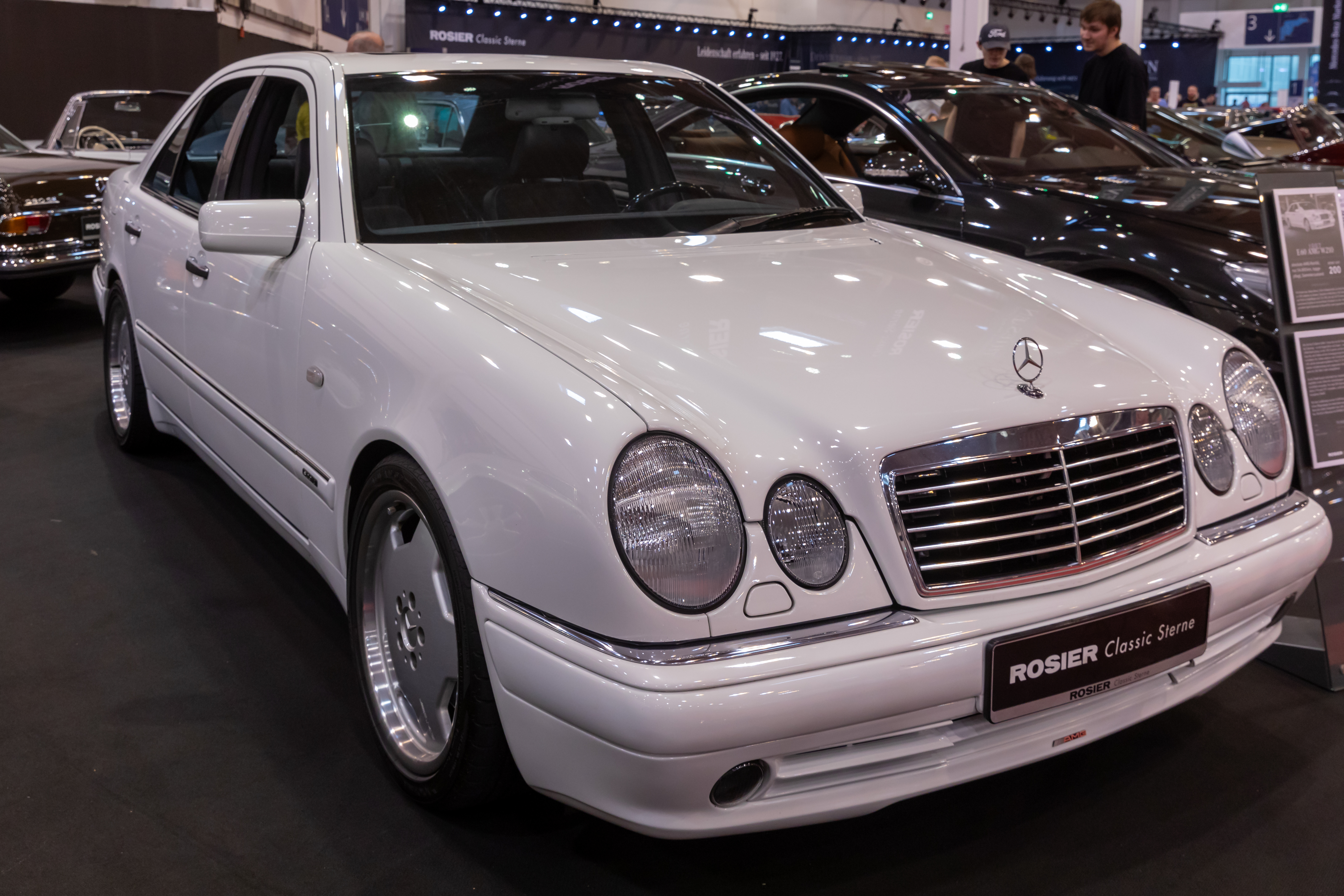
E 60 AMG

== Problems and reliability concerns ==
Recorded problem areas include drivetrain, electrical-system and corrosion issues.

=== Drivetrain ===
Petrol-engine issues include rough running from air-mass sensors, stalling at idle, poor pull from crankshaft sensors and oil leaks at camshaft adjuster magnets that can damage the engine wiring harness and control unit. Early CDI engines had recurring cylinder-head cracks and injector sealing problems. The Lucas distributor injection pump used on the E 220 Diesel can leak as its seals harden with age. The timing chain of the M119 engine in the E 420 and E 50 AMG can be a high-mileage problem. M112 six-cylinder engines can develop oil leaks at the valve-cover gaskets from around 170,000 km.

Automatic transmissions need maintenance for long service life. Shifting problems are often linked to fluid condition. Mercedes-Benz later changed its guidance from lifetime fill to a one-time automatic-transmission-fluid change at 60,000 km. The central electrical connector of the automatic transmission can leak, allowing ATF to travel through wiring into the transmission control unit.

Additional reliability items included:

- Harmonic balancer: some M112 and M113 engines used harmonic balancer pulleys that could fail because of a supplier quality issue; Mercedes-Benz USA issued Service Campaign #2005-020003 for inspection and replacement where required.
- Blower motor regulator: failure of the regulator could limit climate-control fan speed; the revised regulator required a matching blower motor, while some owners adapted a W140 S-Class regulator.
- Front sway-bar drop links: worn drop links were associated with clicking or rattling from the front suspension at low speed.
- Front spring perches: corrosion at the upper spring perches could lead to front suspension collapse; the condition was not visible without removing the protective mastic.
- Window regulators: plastic components in the power-window regulator could fail and stop window operation.
- M104 cylinder-head gasket: M104 engines can develop oil leakage at the rear of the cylinder head.
- Differential bushing: rear independent-suspension differential bushings can wear under high-performance driving and cornering.
- Front lower control arms: corrosion could affect high-mileage vehicles in climates where salt is used on roads, especially near the weld between the stamped sheet-metal control arm and cast section.

=== Electrical system ===
Recorded electrical issues include frequent bulb failures on early cars without xenon headlights, reduced light output due to yellowed or scratched plastic lenses, ABS and ESP warnings, alternator replacement, brake-light switch defects and pixel failures in the instrument cluster from model year 2000.

=== Body corrosion ===
Corrosion affected all production years. The corrosion problem has been linked to the water-based paint process introduced in 1993 and to microbiological contamination of cathodic dip-paint baths.

Common corrosion areas include door edges beneath rubber seals, battery compartment beneath the rear seat, front spring towers and upper shock absorber mounts, subframes, bonnet edges, tailgate areas, boot-lock areas, underbody areas and seam edges.

A University of Stuttgart dissertation identifies microbiological contamination in electrophoretic dip-paint material, including the bacterium Burkholderia cepacia. It describes a pH increase from 5.9 to 6.3, consumption of acetate and L-lactate neutralising agents, surface defects such as craters and bubbles, poorer coating wrap around cut sheet-metal edges, paint sludge formation, increased coating thickness and reduced coating resistance.

=== Corrosion criticism and legal cases ===
The rust issue was reported by the motoring press from around 2000 and affected all models. Mercedes-Benz granted goodwill repairs depending on vehicle condition and earlier repairs, generally up to the eighth year and for some components up to the tenth year, with stronger media pressure from 2001.

A claim based on the 30-year perforation warranty for vehicles sold from 24 October 1998 was rejected by the German Federal Court of Justice on 12 December 2007 because the required servicing had not been carried out by authorised workshops (case VIII ZR 187/06). The Stuttgart Higher Regional Court reached the same result on 14 October 2008 (case 1 U 74/08).

The Thuringian Higher Regional Court later upheld a corrosion claim under the MobiloLife warranty for a Mercedes-Benz Vito from 2000 on 23 May 2011.

== Model lineage ==
The W210 replaced the W124 E-Class after 1995. Mainland European market launch was stated as September 1995, and United States launch as 8 November 1995. W210 saloons were replaced by the W211 after 2002, while estates changed to the W211 body style after 2003.

== Production ==
Mercedes-Benz/Daimler reported total production of 1,653,437 W210 vehicles from Sindelfingen, Rastatt and Graz. A Mercedes-Benz Public Archive page gives saloon production as 1,374,409 vehicles. Estate production was 279,238 vehicles.
