= Mercedes-Benz W124 =

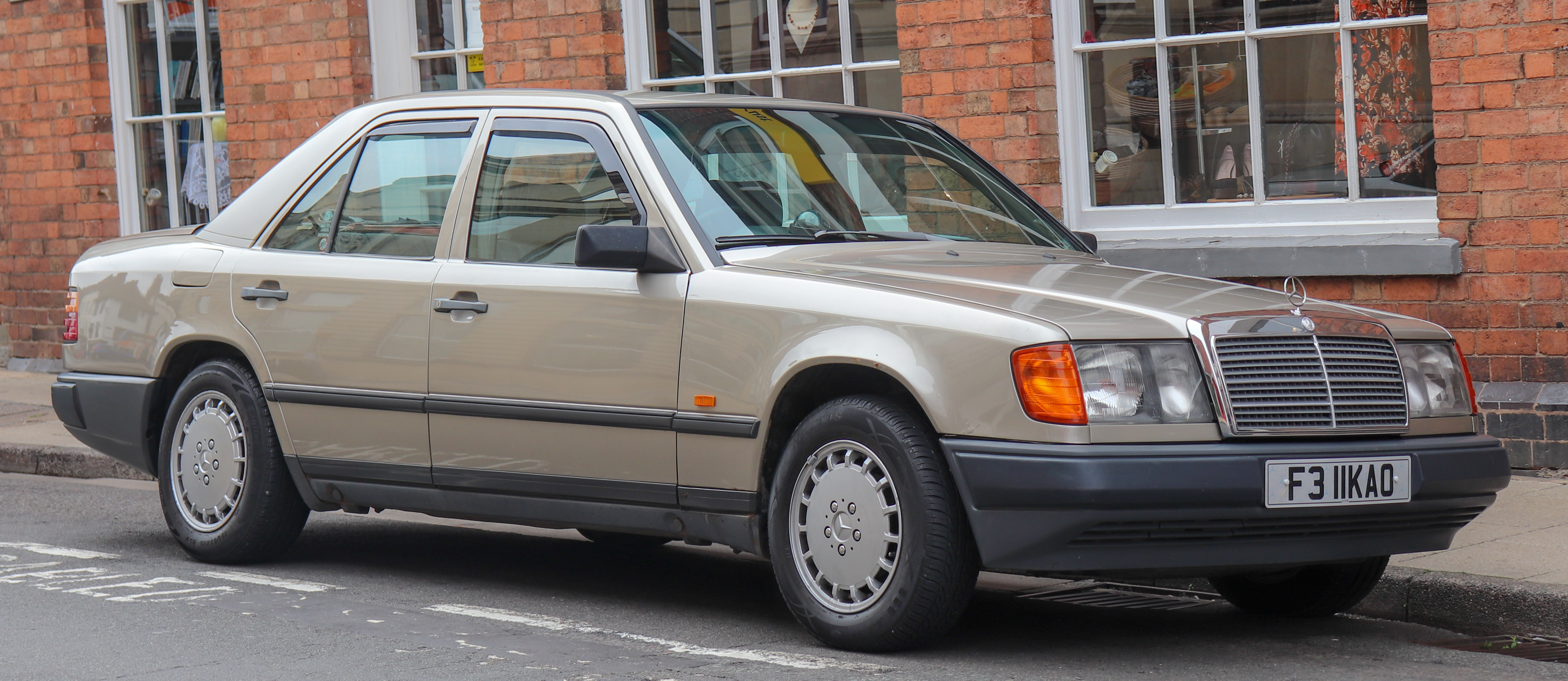

Overview
- Manufacturer: Daimler-Benz
- Production: Saloon: January 1985 – August 1995; (2,213,140 ex.); Estate: October 1985 – February 1996; (333,227 ex.); Coupé: April 1987 – March 1996; (141,498 ex.); Cabriolet: March 1992 – July 1997; (33,952 ex.); Total: 2,721,817 ex., excluding commercial chassis
- Assembly: Germany: Bremen; Rastatt; Sindelfingen; Zuffenhausen; Poland: Karczew; South Africa: Eastern Cape; India: Pune (TELCO); Mexico: Toluca; Indonesia: Bogor Regency, Wanaherang; Malaysia: Johor Bahru (OASB)
- Designer: Joseph Gallitzendörfer and Peter Pfeiffer (initial design); Bruno Sacco (final design)

Body and chassis
- Class: Executive car/Grand tourer (E/S)
- Body style: 4-door saloon; 5-door estate; 2-door coupé; 2-door cabriolet; 6-door limousine
- Layout: Front engine, rear-wheel drive / four-wheel drive
- Related: Mercedes-Benz E-Class; Ssangyong Chairman

Powertrain
- Engine: Petrol I4: 2.0 L M102; 2.0 L M111; 2.2 L M111; 2.3 L M102; I6: 2.6 L M103; 2.8 L M104; 3.0 L M103; 3.0 L M104; 3.2 L M104; 3.4 L M104; 3.6 L M104; V8: 4.2 L M119; 5.0 L M119; 6.0 L M119; Diesel I4: 2.0 L OM601; I5: 2.5 L OM602; 2.5 L OM605; I6: 3.0 L OM603; 3.0 L OM606
- Transmission: Automatic; 4-speed 4G-Tronic; 5-speed 4G-Tronic 722.5; Manual; 4-speed (floor or column); 5-speed (floor)

Dimensions
- Wheelbase: saloon/estate: 110.2 in (2,799 mm); coupé/convertible: 106.9 in (2,715 mm); limousine: 141.7 in (3,599 mm)
- Length: saloon: 187.2 in (4,755 mm); estate: 188.2 in (4,780 mm); coupé: 183.9 in (4,671 mm); limo: 218.1 in (5,540 mm)
- Width: 68.5 in (1,740 mm); 500 E saloon: 70.7 in (1,796 mm)
- Height: estate: 59.8 in (1,519 mm); saloon: 56.3 in (1,430 mm); 500 E saloon: 55.4 in (1,407 mm); coupé: 55.5 in (1,410 mm); convertible: 54.8 in (1,392 mm); limo: 58.3 in (1,481 mm)
- Curb weight: 3,826 lb (1,735 kg) (400 E); 3,927 lb (1,781 kg) (500 E)

Chronology
- Predecessor: Mercedes-Benz W123
- Successor: Mercedes-Benz E-Class (W210) (sedan/estate); Mercedes-Benz CLK-Class (C208) (coupé/cabriolet)

The Mercedes-Benz W124 is a range of executive cars made by Daimler-Benz from 1984 to 1997. The range included numerous body configurations, and though collectively referred to as the W-124, official internal chassis designations varied by body style: saloon (W 124); estate (S 124); coupé (C 124); cabriolet (A 124); limousine (V 124); rolling chassis (F 124); and long-wheelbase rolling chassis (VF 124).

From 1993, the 124 series was officially marketed as the E-Class. The W 124 followed the 123 series from 1984 and was succeeded by the W 210 E-Class (saloons, estates, rolling chassis) after 1995, and the C 208 CLK-Class (coupés, and cabriolets) in 1997.

In North America, the W124 was launched in early November 1985 as a 1986 model and marketed through the 1995 model year. Pre-series production began at the beginning of November 1984, with press presentation on Monday, 26 November 1984 in Seville, Spain, and customer deliveries and European market launch starting in January 1985.

== History ==
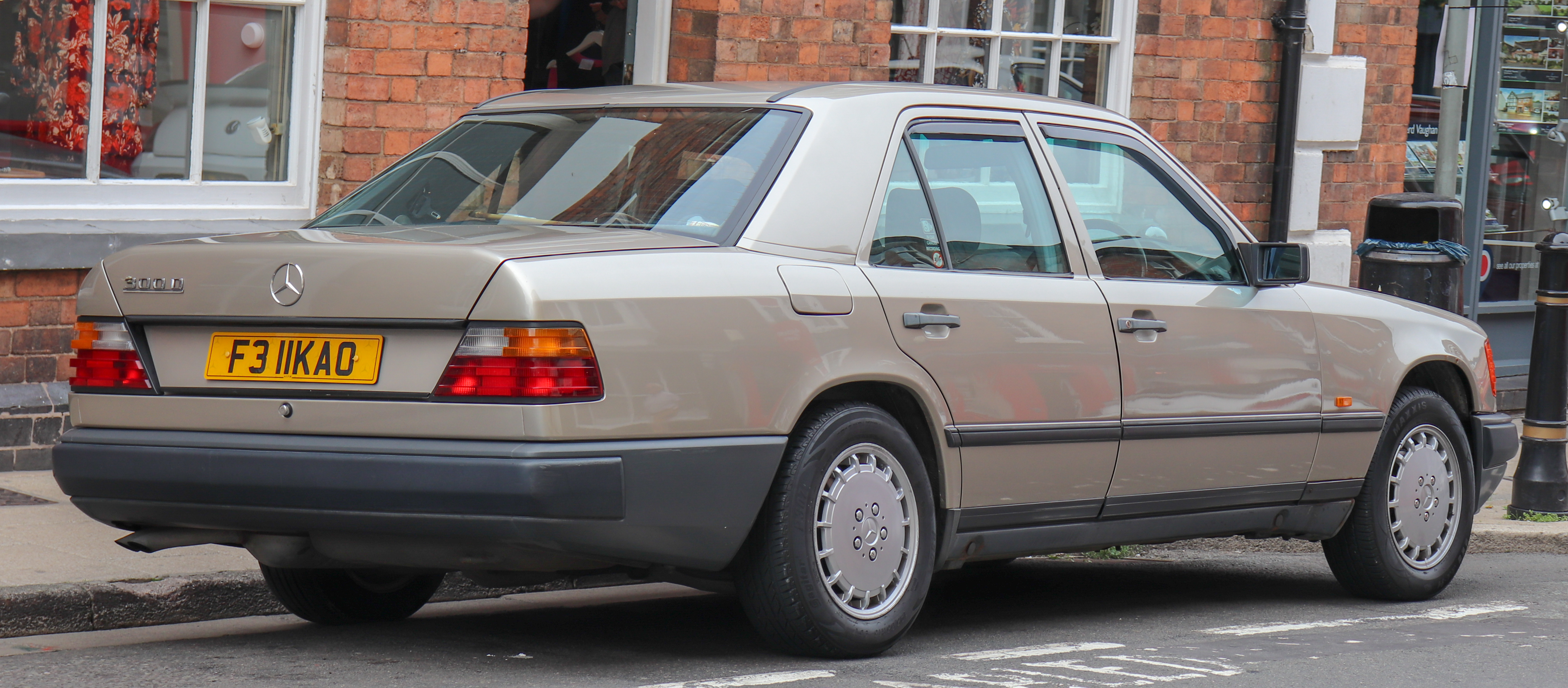
Pre-facelift 300D

The W124 was a mid-sized vehicle platform, which entered planning in the autumn of 1976 under development Hans Scherenberg. In July 1977, the W124 program officially began, with research and development managed by newly appointed Werner Breitschwerdt. In April 1978, decisions were made to base it on the Mercedes-Benz W201 model program. By April 1979, a package plan was completed for the program, laying out the guidelines of the project. During the winter of 1980–1981, the final exterior for the W124 program was completed, chosen as the leading proposal by design director Bruno Sacco, and approved by the board of management in early 1981. By mid-1982, the first prototypes reflective of the production design, were assembled and sent to testing. In March 1984, pilot production commenced and development of the sedan concluded with engineering sign-off.

Front suspension used a separate spring and damper with a rubber top mount with control arms directly mounted to the body, without a subframe. The rear suspension of the W124 featured the Mercedes multi-link axle introduced in 1982 with the Mercedes W201 and which is now standard on many modern cars. Estate cars (and optionally, sedans and coupés) had Citroën-like rear self-leveling suspension with suspension struts rather than shock absorbers, gas-filled suspension spheres to provide damping and an under bonnet pressurizing pump. Unlike the traditional Citroën application, the Mercedes suspension system had a fixed ride height and employed rear coil springs to maintain the static ride height when parked.

The W124 was the first Mercedes series to be fitted with the iconic 15-hole, flat-faced alloy wheels characteristic of Mercedes-Benz cars of the 1980s and 1990s. The alloy wheels were nicknamed 'Gullideckel' or manhole covers, because they resemble manhole or drainage covers in Germany, which are consistently round in shape with a series of 15- or 16-holes around the outer edge, often within a concentric ring. Gullideckel wheels in a variety of diameter and offset specifications were later incorporated into the facelift versions of the W126 S-Class, R107 SL and W201 190E series, and were also the 'non-option' wheel on the R129 SL-Class roadster.

Much of the 124's engineering and many of its features were advanced automotive technology at its introduction, incorporating innovations that have been adopted throughout the industry. It had one of the lowest coefficient of drag (Cd) of any vehicle of the time (0.28 for the 200/200D model for the European market with 185/65 R15 tires) due to its aerodynamic body, that included plastic molding for the undercarriage to streamline airflow beneath the car, reducing fuel consumption and wind noise. It had a single windscreen wiper that had an eccentric mechanism at its base that extended the wiper's reach to the top corners of the windscreen (more than if it had traveled in a simple arc). The saloon/sedan, coupés and convertibles had optional rear headrests that would fold down remotely to improve rearward visibility when required. This feature was not available for the T-model because of its specific layout (no space to store the retractable headrests), but the estate serially came with a "neighbour-friendly" rear door that was pulled in the shut-position silently and automatically by a sensor-controlled servomotor. This allowed the use of a tighter fitting rear gate, minimizing the cabin noise in the T-model - sometimes an area of concern for station wagons.

The estate cars (chassis designation S124) came in 5 or 7-seat models, the 7-seater having a rear-facing bench seat that folded flush luggage compartment cover and an optional (in the US until 1994) retractable cargo net. To provide a flat loading floor with the seat folded down, the T-model's rear seat squab was mounted about 10 cm (3.9 in) higher than in saloons, robbing rear seat passengers of some head room. The S124 estate continued in production alongside the new W210 until the S210 estate launched more than a year later. A two-door coupé version was also built, with the chassis designation C124.

The E 320, E 220, and E 200 cabriolets ceased production in 1997. Indian assembly (in a joint-venture with Telco called Mercedes-Benz India) began in March 1995. Offered with five-cylinder diesel engines built by Mercedes' Indian partner Bajaj Tempo, the W124 was replaced there in December 1997.

== Models ==
=== Initial launch range ===
Upon launch of serial production in January 1985 (the sedan went on sale in December 1984), the range consisted of seven models, to replace the seven W123 models in production (200, 230E, 250, 280E, 200D, 240D, 300D).

- The four cylinder petrol range consisted of the M102 powered 200 and 230E models. Both were carried over from the previous generation but with refined timing and compression ratios for better performance. The former had the 1997cc engine with the Stromberg 175 CDT carburetor, and the latter, bored out to 2299 cc, had the Bosch KE-Jetronic fuel injection.
- The six cylinder petrol range had the 260E and 300E models. Unlike the predecessors, which had two different engines, these were now powered by the new M103 of 2599 and 2962cc displacements, differing only in cylinder bore size.
- The diesel range was manifested by the 200D, 250D, and 300D with the new OM601, OM602, and OM603 engine series in four, five, and six-cylinder configurations.
- All of the engines represented the modular OHC design with a 15° incline. Petrol motors featured breakerless transistorised TSZ ignition. Diesels had the mechanical injection with Bosch fuel pump/distributor.
- Standard was the 4 speed manual transmission, except on the six-cylinder models which had the overdrive 5 speed, available as option for others. The W4A 020 (722.4) 4-speed automatic was also available as an option for all except the 300E, which had the stronger W4A 040 (722.3).
- Power steering was standard on all models. Optional were the rear adjustable and self-levelling hydropneumatic suspension mixed with coil springs and anti-lock braking system.

=== 1985: Estates, emissions and exports ===
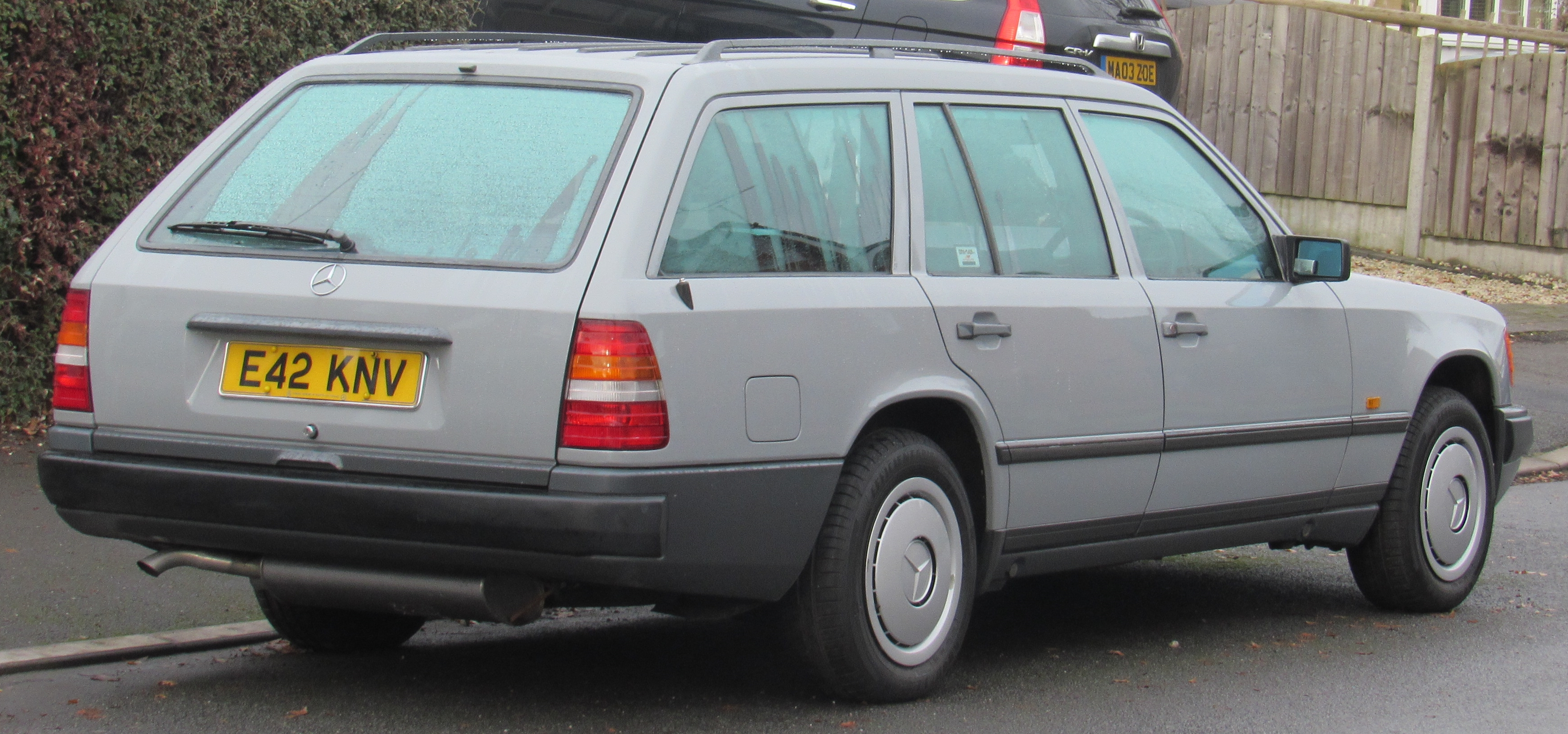
Pre-facelift 200T Estate

In July the range gained another model, the 200E, only for the Italian market. This fuel injected variant of the 200 was meant to suit Italy's tax rates which were based on engine displacement – making it essential to have a more powerful offering beneath the significant 2,000 cc threshold. This version came standard with a five-speed manual transmission or with an optional automatic.

The estate, S124, went on sale in September 1985, repeating most of the sedan's range with the 200T, 230TE, 300TE, 200TD, and 250TD models. However, it lacked the 2.6-litre M103 and the 3 litre OM603. The latter, 300TD, would join the lineup a year later.

Sales to the United States for the 1986 Model year began in autumn with the sole offering of the 300E sedan in both five-speed and automatic versions. Mercedes-Benz had to modify production for the US market to comply with the Environmental Protection Agency's (EPA) automotive emission control regulations and the US Department of Transportation passenger safety regulations. The W124 design incorporated most of these requirements from the beginning, meaning that the only visible cue for American-destined W124s were the rectangular sealed-beam headlights. Although the US cars were still 100 kg heavier than their European counterparts, engine performance was identical for the duration of production.

While the United States strictly enforced its emission control laws, the European Community's dedication to emission control was much more lax. The 1970 70/220/EEC directive would slowly evolve into the European emission standards that came into effect in January 1993 as the Euro 1, with mandatory catalytic converters on petrol-engined cars. This gave automotive producers plenty of time to adjust their production to comply with these requirements. Mercedes-Benz began doing so in September 1985, marking its vehicles with three labels: ECE, retroactively applied to unmodified vehicles; KAT, applied to those equipped with the three-way catalytic converter; and RÜF (Rückrüstfahrzeug, which loosely translates as 'retrofit vehicle'), engineered for later installation of the catalytic converter. Engines equipped with catalytic converters also got the EZL ignition system, where distributor advance would now be governed by the ECU taking into account crankshaft and throttle positions, intake vacuum, and air and coolant temperatures, as opposed to the analogue vacuum-driven ignition advance of the TSZ. Only the carburetted 200 and 200T models remained in their original ECE versions.

The effect of the different emissions modifications varied according to type and engine, with the six-cylinders losing up to 10 hp (in part from having their compression ratio decreased) and gaining up to 50 kg in weight, with acceleration, top speed, and fuel expenditure suffering accordingly.

=== 1986: Turbos and catalysts ===
The transitional state for optional catalytic converters ended in September 1986, when they became standard, but the RÜF version would remain a discount option in certain markets. This included the carburettor fed 200 and 200T models, which gained a new double barrel Pierburg 2EE downdraft carburettor and EZL ignition.

For the American 1987 MY, Mercedes-Benz introduced the Garret T3 Turbocharger on the OM603, resulting in the 300D Turbo and 300TD Turbo models, initially only available in the United States. These were seen as successors to the 300D Turbodiesel W123 range, which was the sole representative of that car in the United States from model year 1984 through 1986. Also for 1987, the 5 speed manual option was pulled out for the 300E sedan, leaving all American cars as automatics.

It was during this time that Mercedes-Benz became increasingly concerned at the abundance of "grey market" imports. The US legislature not only allowed for registration of privately bought foreign car, but also for third parties to officially import the cars for distribution without paying any commissions to the official dealers. Prior to 1980 the scale was superficial, but as the EPA and CAFE regulations put severe restrictions, compelling Mercedes-Benz to abandon on its petrol engine range of all save the flagship models, grey import dealers filled the void. By 1985 60,000 vehicles were being imported into the United States, with every third being a Mercedes.

With the launch of the W124 model (and parallel new generation of motors for the S-class and the SL) whose performance was now equal to the models on the home market, Mercedes-Benz pursued a multi-million US dollar congressional lobbying campaign that would ultimately manifest in the Imported Vehicle Safety Compliance Act effectively banning private import of all vehicles less than 25 years old.

=== 1987: Coupés and 4Matics ===
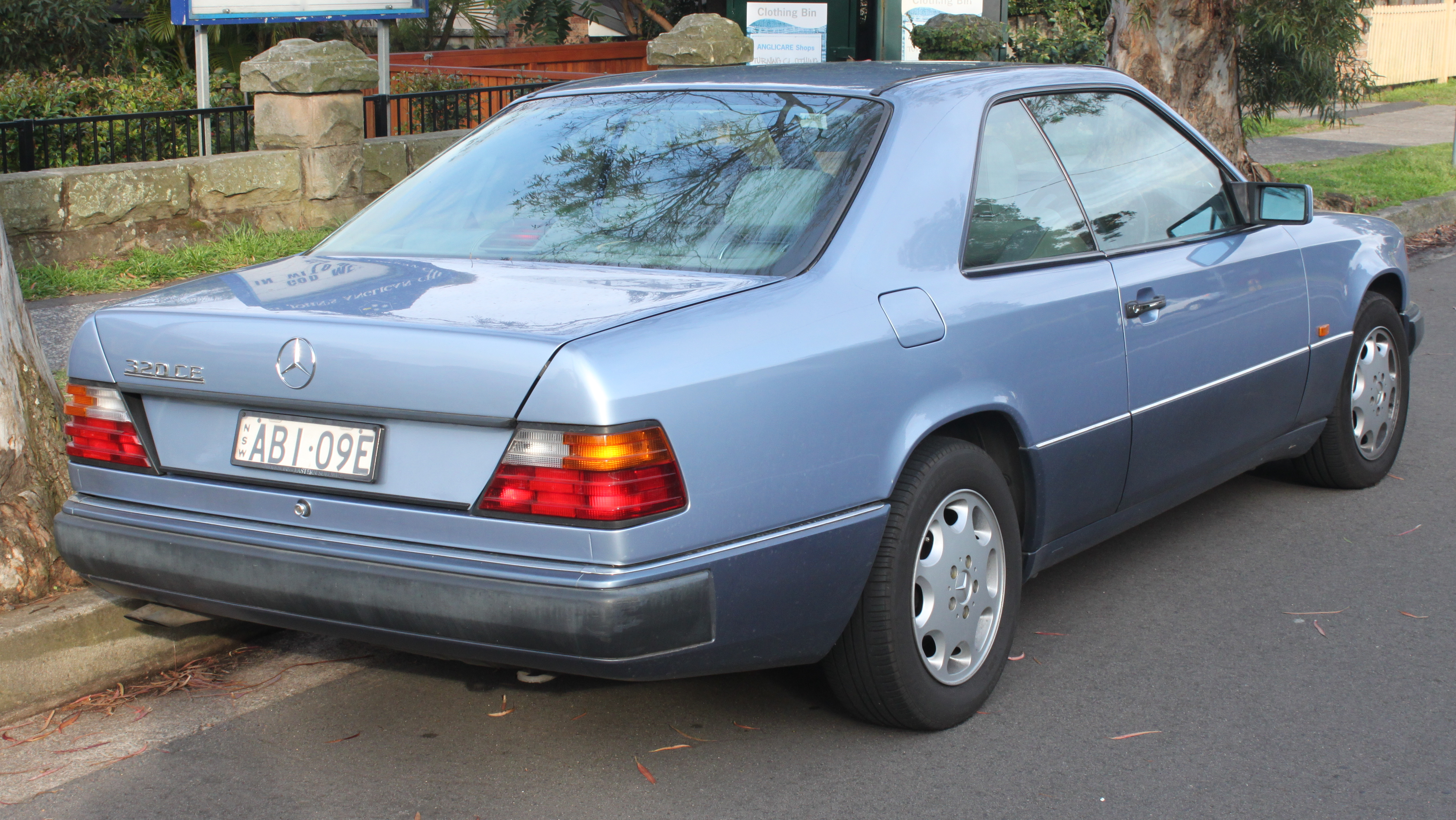
320 CE coupe (pre-facelift)

In early 1987 Mercedes-Benz presented the 2-door coupé. Compared to the sedan, it had a shorter wheelbase and lower roofline, with pillarless glazing. For the comfort of the rear passengers, instead of the large panoramic window of the predecessor, the ceiling padding extended further aback below the rear window glass. The model range consisted of two models: the 230CE and 300CE, with the same M102 and M103 engines as for the sedan/estate, but with the 5-speed manual standard for both cars.

The 4 Matic all-wheel drive system first introduced on the W124. 1 is the engine, 2 are hydraulically enabled clutches, and 3 is the central differential.

One of the major novelties for 1987 was the introduction of the 4Matic all-wheel drive system, developed to rival Audi's Quattro and BMW's iX system. The system used a number of sensors to determine loss of traction and would automatically engage the central differential to provide drive to all four wheels, and then successively lock it and the rear differential as road conditions dictated. The system was initially offered for the 260E, 300E, 300D sedans as well as 300D and 300TD Turbo estates (with the 300D Turbo sedan joining in the following year). All normally aspirated engines could have the choice with either the manual or automatic transmission.

Another major milestone in 1987 was Mercedes-Benz discontinuing its W124 diesel range for North America for the upcoming 1988 MY. This was caused by the reliability issues with the Diesel particulate filter mandated by the California Air Resources Board. Instead, the petrol-engined 300TE was added (hitherto, the only T-model offered in North America had been the diesel). Previously reserved for the American market, the 300D Turbo and 300TD Turbo became available in all markets during 1987.

=== 1988: Clean diesel and fuel injection ===
Addressing the issue of Diesel emissions, Mercedes Benz made a major modification to the OM 603, redesigning the cylinder head pre-chambers with angled fuel injection. This facilitated more efficient combustion and gave a small power boost. Also, the particulate filter location was moved further away from the engine, while the injection pumps got altitude correction. The end result was a 40 percent reduction in emissions. Aspirated diesels started receiving this technology in February 1989.

The withdrawal of the turbocharged motors from the US market included the 190D 2.5 Turbo, powered by the OM602 equipped with the Garrett T25 turbocharger. To take advantage of the production capacity, Mercedes-Benz opted to add this engine to the W124 lineup as the 250D Turbo. In parallel to the facelift of the W201 190, Mercedes-Benz made standard some of the previous extra-cost options: namely the ABS, heated driver's door mirrors and the tank, jets and hoses of the windscreen washer across the whole range of the 124 series.

Also in 1988, Mercedes-Benz began its commitment to fully transition to fuel injection. For this it began to offer the 200E and 200TE models – with the former already having been offered in Italy – to supplement the 200 and 200T as new entry models, actively encouraging dealers to promote them to cost-sensitive customers, sometimes, as a no-extra cost discount given the very subtle price difference.

For the United States, the 300E and 300TE were joined by the 300CE coupé and the 260E for the 1989 model year.

=== 1989: First facelift and 24 valve ===
In September 1989 the whole series underwent its first facelift. Externally the cars can be distinguished with plastic side panels, whose top interface had bright chrome strip that continued across the front and rear bumpers. Chrome was also introduced in door handles and hub caps. Body coloured mirrors completed the look. Customers could also order a sportline trim with tighter 'sports' suspension, lower driveline and wider 205/60R15 tyres on wider 7J alloy rims (instead of the standard 195/65 R15 on 6.5 inch stamped steel), The facelift was also the curtain call of the RÜF vehicles, as all post facelift W124s now had the catalytic converter as standard.

One major milestone was the introduction of the M104 engine with a double overhead camshaft cylinder head. Mercedes-Benz has deployed DOHC on the popular 190E 2.3-16 performance model, but these were designed and built by Ford-Cosworth whereas, the M104 was internally designed. The model also introduced a two position variable valve timing on the intake shaft and anti-knock ignition correction for the ECU. In the same format as the W201, the models were designated as the 300E-24, 300TE-24 and 300CE-24, indicating the number of valves involved. Sharing the block of the 3.0 litre M103, the motor provided a peak 40 hp boost without any reduction in fuel economy.

The facelifted model went on sale to the United States as the 1990 MY where the 260E was rebadged as the 300E 2.6. Joining it was the 300E 4Matic and 300TE 4Matic models.

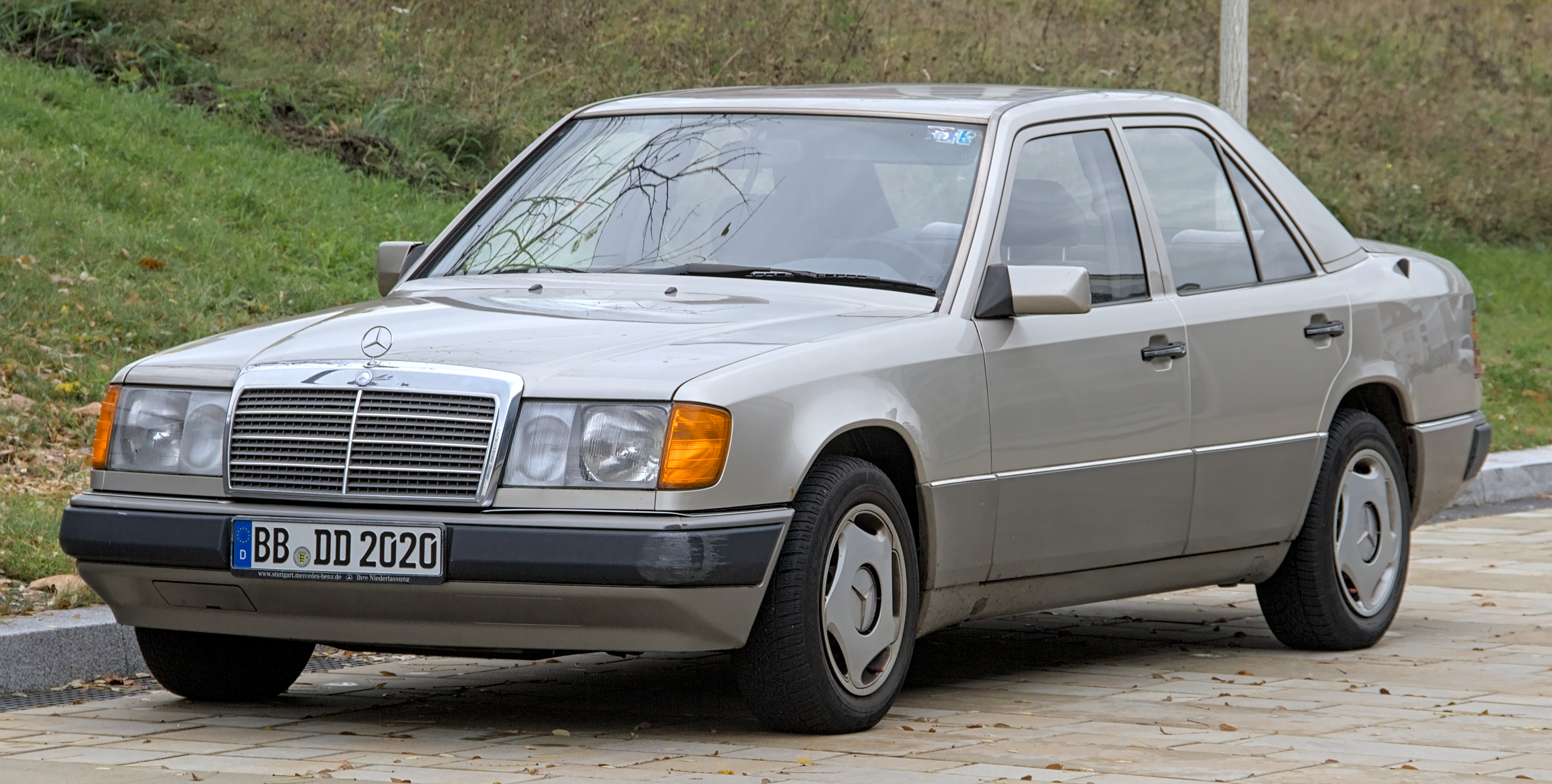
Front (sedan)

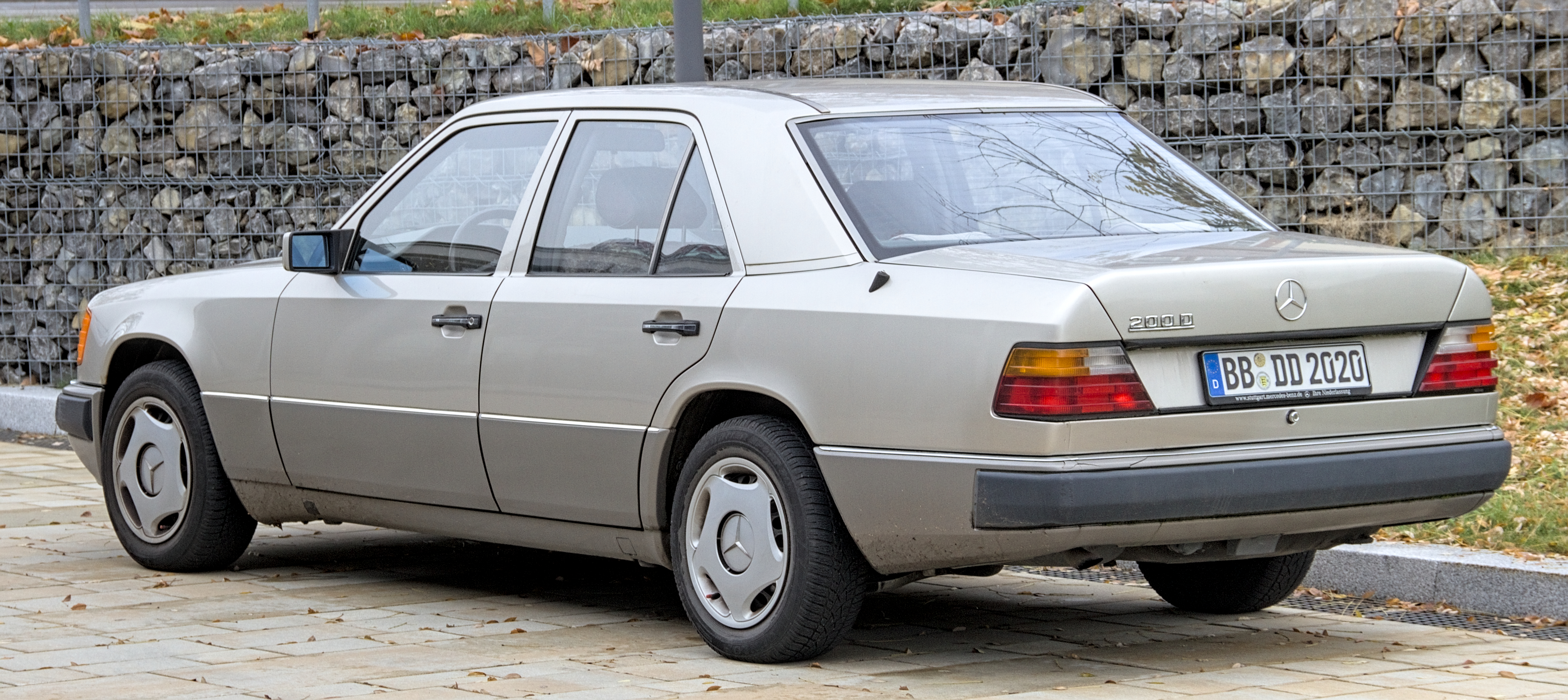
Rear (sedan)

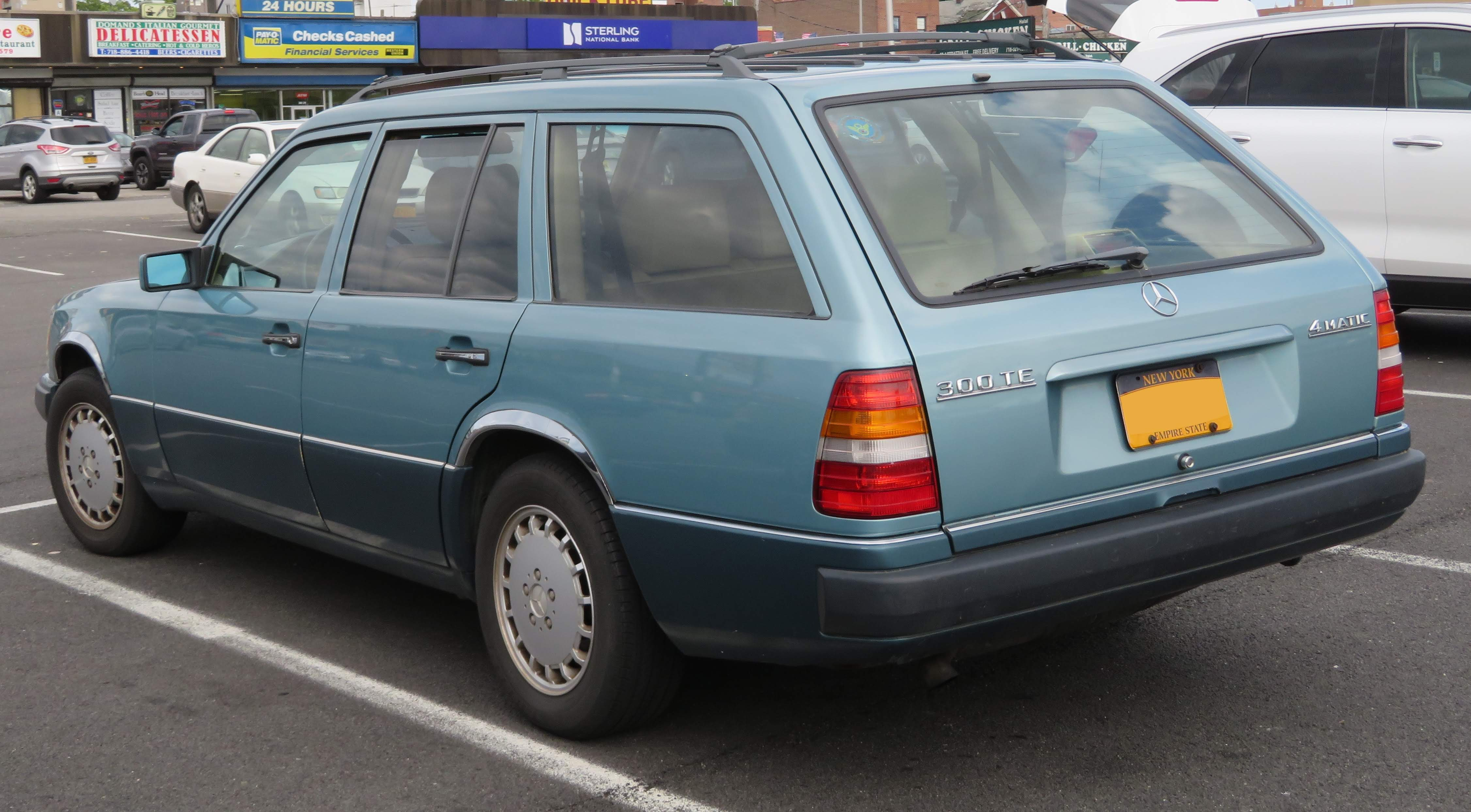
Estate

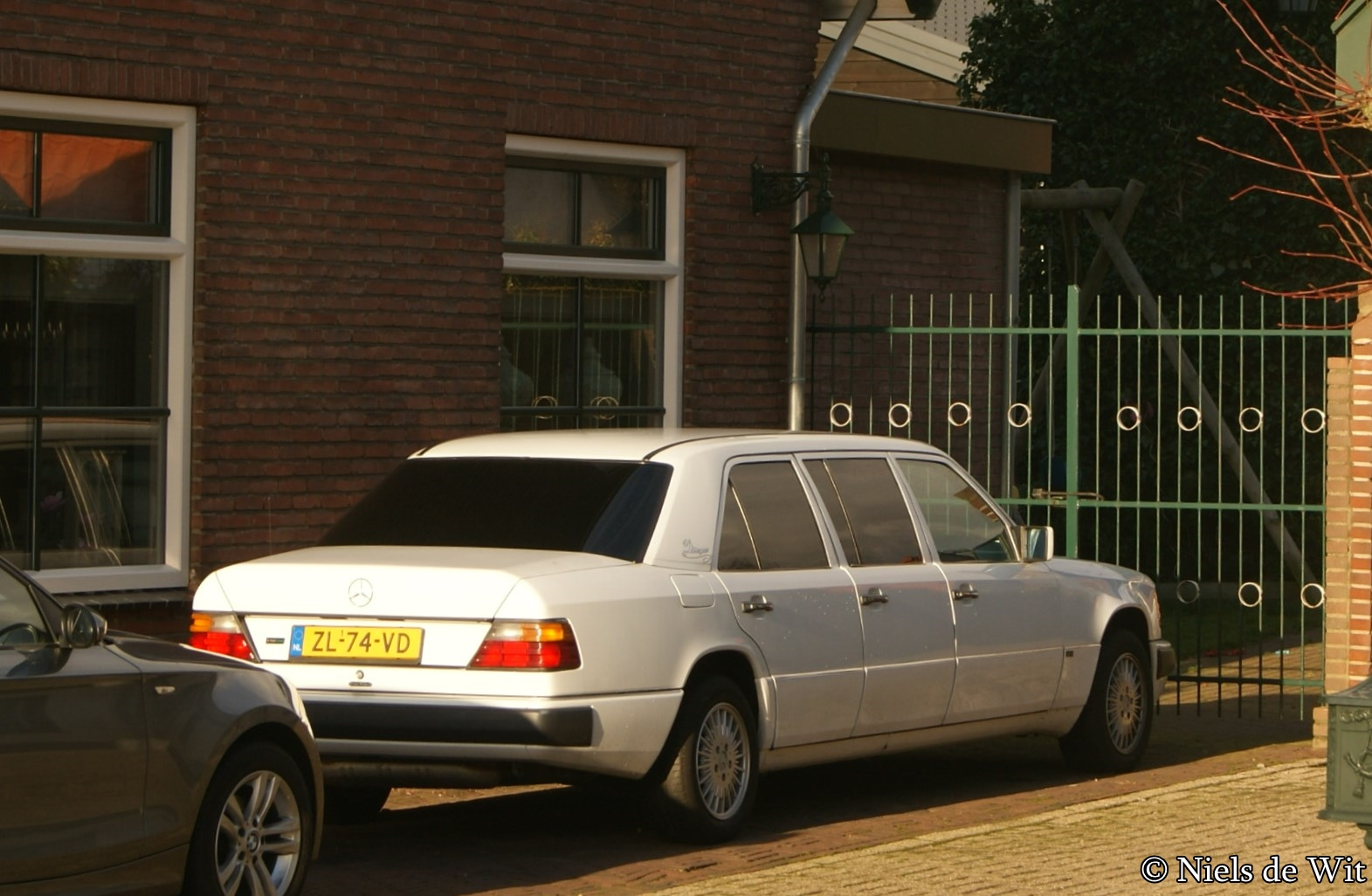
Limousine

=== 1990: Exports, EGR and overdrive ===
In June 1990, two Italy-specific models were introduced: the 250TD Turbo estate and the 200CE coupé, to be in lower tax bands as per smaller engine displacement. Also in 1990, the diesels would make a comeback into the US market for the 1991 MY, but with the turbocharged five-cylinder OM 602 engines, badged as 300D 2.5 Turbo and 300TD 2.5 Turbo. Standard on the US models and optional on other turbocharged diesels was exhaust gas recirculation used in conjunction DPF and oxidation catalysts. Unlike the Petrol engine converters, these did not hamper engine performance, but did offer reduced emissions making the option a worthy investment in markets where road tax was tied to CO_{2}. The technology would be offered on non-turbo Diesels in the spring of 1991.

The other major event for 1990 was the debut of the W5A 030 722.5 automatic transmission for the M104 engined models. It featured an additional overdrive module. 1990 was also the curtain call for carburettors, as the final 200 and 200T were built in June. (The carburettor would carry on in the 190 until January 1991, and in the W460 230G G-wagen until mid-year 1992, though this model was for extra-European export)

=== 1991: 500E ===
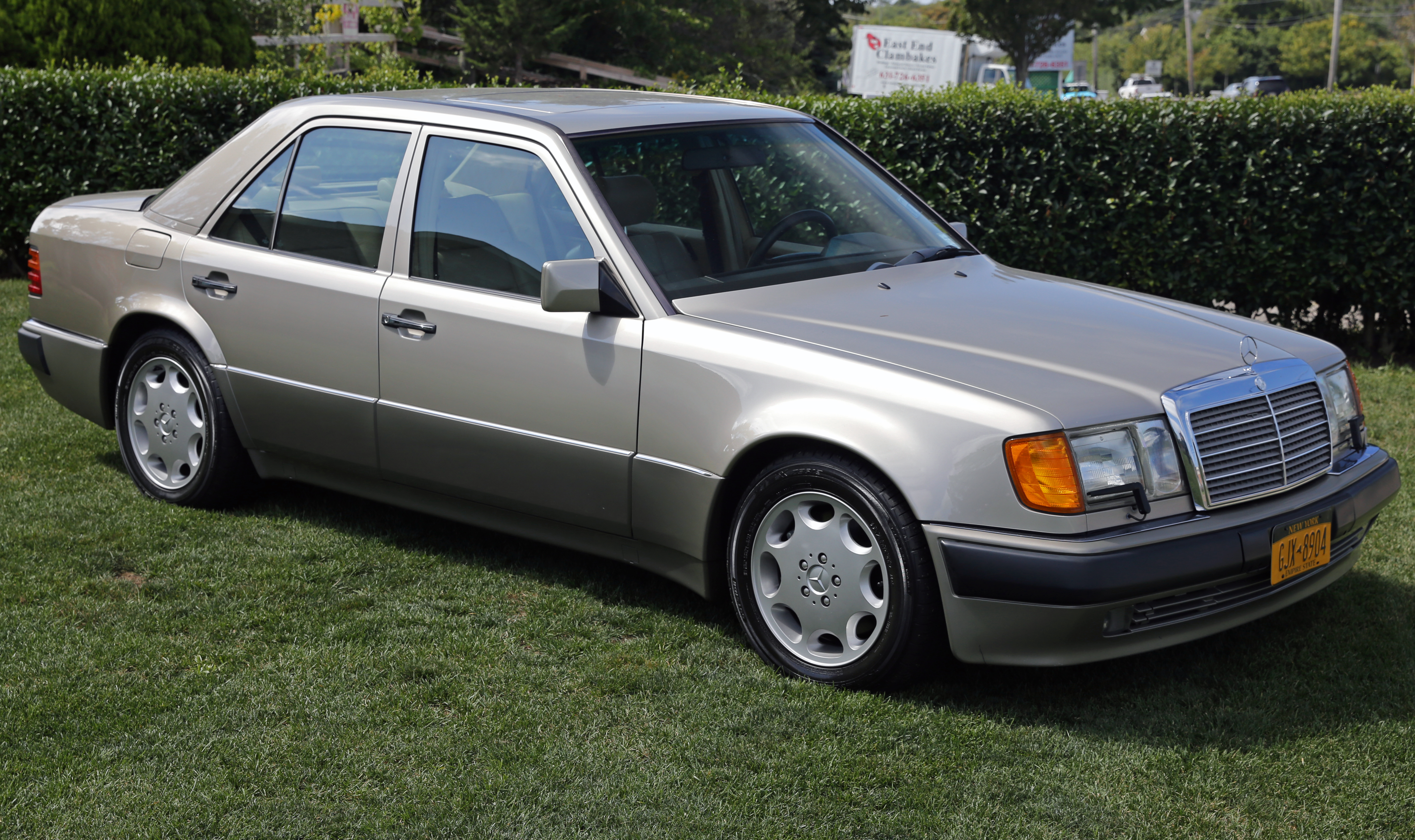
1992 Mercedes-Benz 500 E (W124; US)

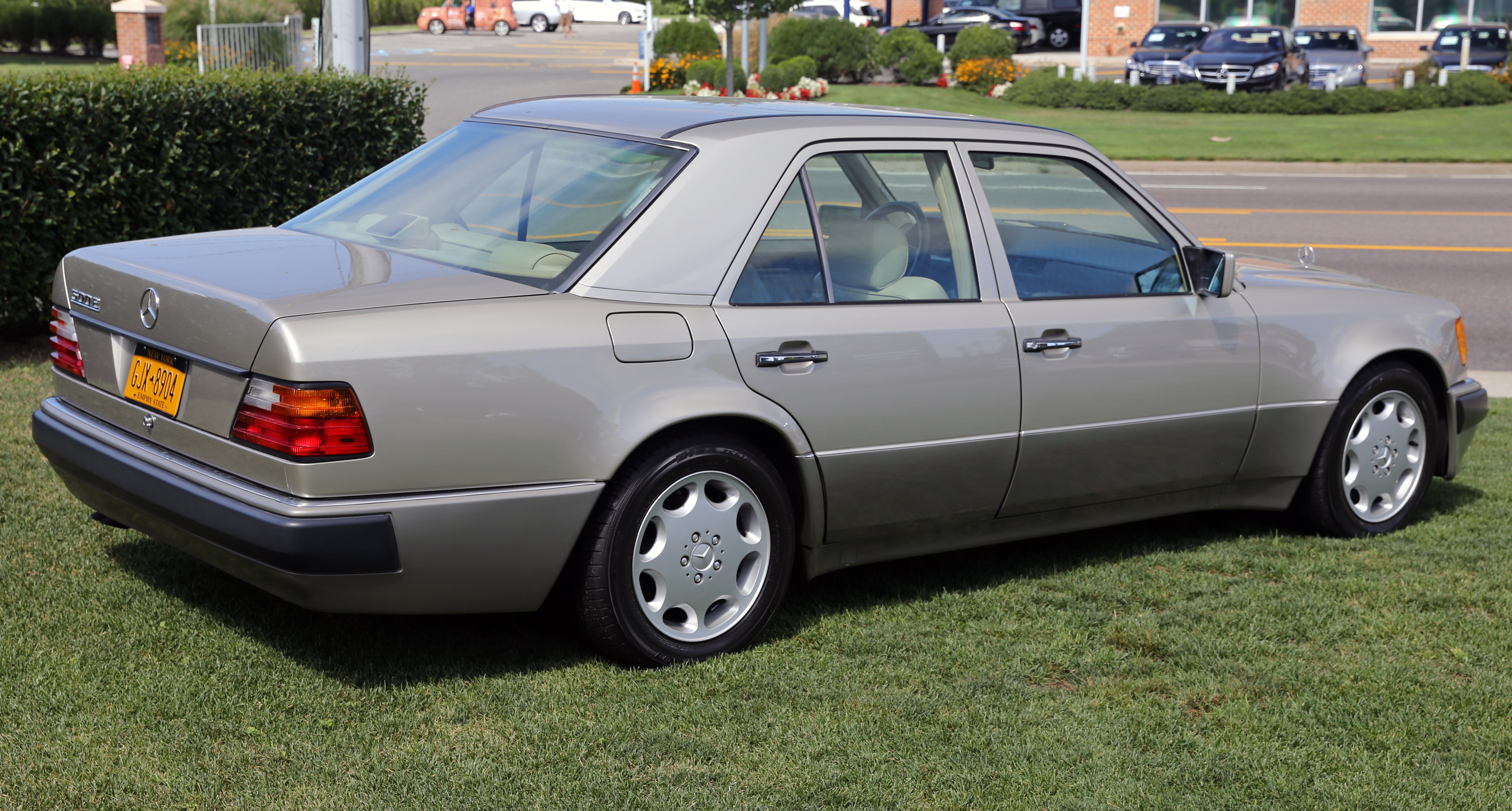
1992 Mercedes-Benz 500 E (W124; US)

The high performance version of the W124, the 500E, was presented in October 1990, with production beginning in February 1991 for spring launch. It used the 5.0 L 32-valve V8 M119 engine based on the one used in the 500 SL (R129) roadster. It was created and built in close cooperation with Porsche, who engineered the suspension and chassis design with a performance bias. Mercedes entered an agreement with Porsche to assemble the vehicles at their plant in Zuffenhausen, as the 500E’s wider fenders caused the car to be too wide to be assembled on the Mercedes-Benz factory production line, and the sportscar maker Porsche was in crisis and its factory capacity was underutilized. Porsche also constructed the chassis for the more restrained 400E, which lacked the 500E's wider fenders – this was in essence identical to the 500E's chassis.

1991 saw discontinuation of several models, namely the 4Matic 260E and non turbocharged 300D (with the remaining models being available with automatic transmission only). Additionally the underpowered and poorly selling 200TD was also retired.

=== 1992: Petrol DOHC and cabriolet ===
Mercedes-Benz incrementally introduced DOHC technology, first in the Cosworth built 16-valve M102s for the 190, then the 24-valve M104 engine & the M119 32-valve engines in 1989. In 1991 it was joined by the 3.2 litre M104 on the new W140 S-class, and in summer 1992 Mercedes-Benz was ready to fully transition to the new engine family across the whole mid-range. All, except the 2.0 litre M111 would gain the new Bosch LH Jetronic with HFM system in place of the KE-Jetronic with the EZL ignition and would revert to the pre-catalyst 10.0 compression ratio.

Mercedes-Benz also used this opportunity to optimise the manufacturing process, by making a universal bore size of 89.9 mm for all four engines, thus achieving two identical cylinder blocks and altering stroke ratio using a range of crankshafts and rods, rather than having to machine four sets of blocks for a universal 80.25 mm stroke.

- In place of the four cylinder 1997 cc M102 was the more undersquare (78.7 mm stroke) 1998 cc M111, represented in the 200E, 200TE & 200CE models, with the latter being available now in Greece and Portugal, in addition to Italy. Unlike the other engines, this had a Siemens Pressure Engine Control system which timed injection from manifold pressure (instead of the hot wire mass airflow sensor used in the LH-Jetronic), lacked the variable valve timing mechanism on the intake camshaft and had a smaller compression rise to 9.6. A boost of 15% (18hp) in power and 10% (18 Nm) in torque was provided.
- The bigger and very oversquare (95.5 mm bore) 2299 cc M102 of the 230 series was replaced by the almost square 2199 cc M111 in the new 220E, 220TE & 220CE models. Despite the smaller displacement, the boost was 14 & 6 % (18 hp and 12 Nm).
- Conversely, the almost square (82.9 mm bore) six cylinder 2599 cc M103 of the 260 series, formerly represented solely on the sedan, was replaced by the very short stroke (73.5 mm) 2799 cc M104 on the 280E, which was now also available on the estate as the 280TE. Here the boost was most dramatic, a 23% increase in both power (37 hp) and torque (50 Nm).
- The top, oversquare (88.5 mm) 2962 cc M103 300 series and the M104 300-24 series was replaced by the stroked (84 mm) 3199 cc M104, becoming the 320E, 320CE & 320CE. The stroke ratio was the same as for the OM603 diesel, allowing the use of the same crankshaft. Compared to the 300-24 M104, peak power remained at 220 PS (162 kW), but at a lower engine speed, down from 6400 to 5500. Torque also got a 17 percent boost (45 Nm increase).
- The 300E and 300TE 4Matic models retained the OHC M103 engine.

1993 MY US export retained the 300 series badging (300E, 300CE & 300CE) in spite of having the 3.2 litre engine. The 280E was badged as 300E 2.8. Also for the 1993, export of the 4Matic models were discontinued.

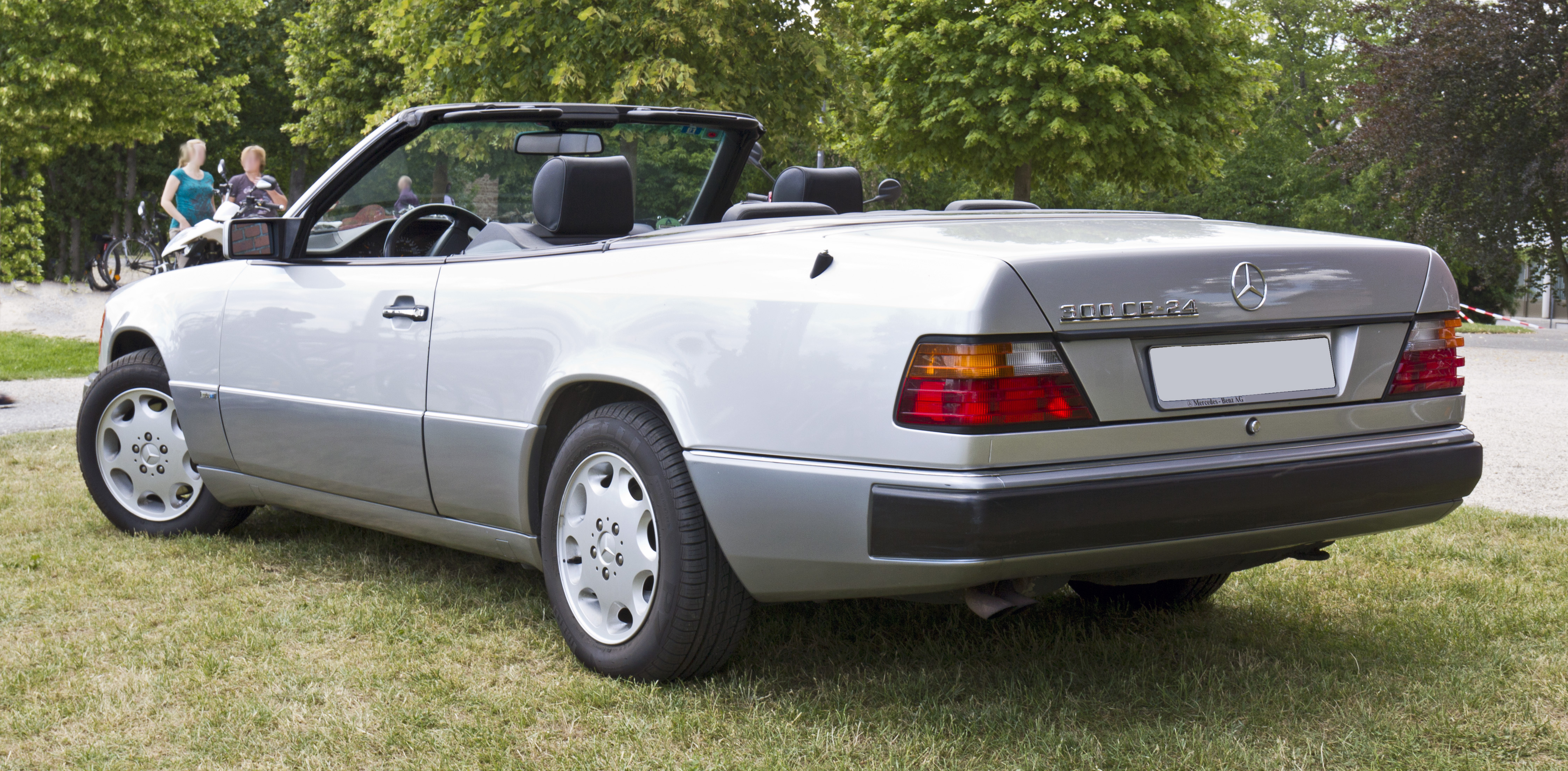
300CE-24 Cabriolet (pre-facelift)

The other major event for 1992 was the start of the A124 Cabriolet production. After the end of the W111 280SE and 280SE 3.5 in 1971, the cabriolet was absent from the line-up for more than two decades. The opportunity for its revival came with the R129 SL, which itself was based on the C124 coupé, where extensive structural reinforcements and emergency gas-fired anti rollover bar enabled compliance with safety regulations. Encouraged by the success of the roadster, Mercedes-Benz embarked on developing a full cabriolet, where the rear passenger headrests covers would act as braces. In Europe production began as the 300CE-24 inheriting the 3.0 M104 motor and the name of the now discontinued C124 namesake. For the United States 1993 MY, Mercedes offered the 300CE cabriolet with the 3.2 litre M104, making it a unique pre-facelift model for that market.

=== 1993: The E-Class ===
In August 1993 Mercedes-Benz released the second facelift of the W124. This time the changes were more significant, particularly at the fascia which was modelled after the W140 S-class and the newly released W202 C-Class, as part of the company's new corporate styling with regard to the radiator grille that was now integrated into the bonnet's contours, along with the pearl-coloured turn indicators. The three-box models' bootlid was also given a small workover, as were the taillights. The estate's rear end remained unchanged, making the discreet facelift even less noticeable. Bumper strips on the aprons were now body coloured. The wheels got new hub caps to complete the look.

The petrol engines remained the same for the sedan, estate, and coupé (although the 2.8 litre M104 lost 4 horsepower to fit into a lower tax band), whilst the cabriolet gained the latter's 2.2 litre M111 and 3.2 litre M104, while the 16-valve, 2.0-litre M111 options were expanded for Greece, Portugal and Italy. The DOHC transition continued on the diesel range, and with the facelift, the 2.5 and 3.0 OM602 and OM603 gained the new 20- and 24-valve cylinder heads, as the OM605 and OM606 motors, providing 20 percent more power. This did not affect the turbocharged models which would retain the SOHC diesels.

The facelift coincided with a major re-badging and rebranding that began with launch of the Mercedes-Benz C-Class (W202) as a replacement for the W201 in March. With the proliferation of series, trims, and models, the old naming system based on engine size, adding an S or SL for the top models, was no longer sufficient. For the new C-class (for Compact) the label now preceded the displacement; and in 1993 the company decided to apply the new system across the entire product line. The W124 series had been the unnamed "standard class" and became the E-Class.. The letter E originally stood for Einspritzung ("injected"), but was changed into signifying Executive. Attributes of body styles such as C or T were dropped. Diesel-powered cars were given a "Diesel" or "Turbodiesel" badge. Thus the '250TD Turbo' became the 'E250 Turbodiesel' wagon.

For the American 1994 MY, the range was condensed to the E320 for all four body styles and the E300 Diesel for the sedan in addition to the V8 powered E420 and E500.

Thus the model range under the new system was:

- E200 with the 2.0 litre, DOHC M111 engine, available all four body styles - although the coupé version was limited to Italy, Portugal and Greece.
- E200 Diesel with the 2.0 litre OM601 engine available solely for the sedan (this model, the 124.120, would be only one produced continuously for the whole W124 lifecycle)
- E220 with the 2.2 litre, DOHC M111 engine available all four body styles.
- E250 Diesel with the new DOHC 2.5 OM605 engine available for the sedan and estate.
- E250 Turbodiesel with the older OHC 2.5 OM602 engine available for the sedan and estate, with the latter being limited to Italy.
- E280 with the 2.8 litre M104 engine available for the sedan and estate
- E300 4Matic retaining the OHC M103 engine, available for the sedan and estate.
- E300 Diesel with the new DOHC 3.0 OM606 engine available for the sedan and estate.
- E300 Turbodiesel with the older OHC 3.0 OM603 engine available for the sedan and estate.
- E300 Turbodiesel 4Matic also keeping the OM603, available for the sedan and estate.
- E320 with the 3.2 litre M104, available for all four body styles
- E420 with the 4.2 litre M119, available only for the sedan
- E500 with the 5.0 litre M119, also limited to the sedan only.
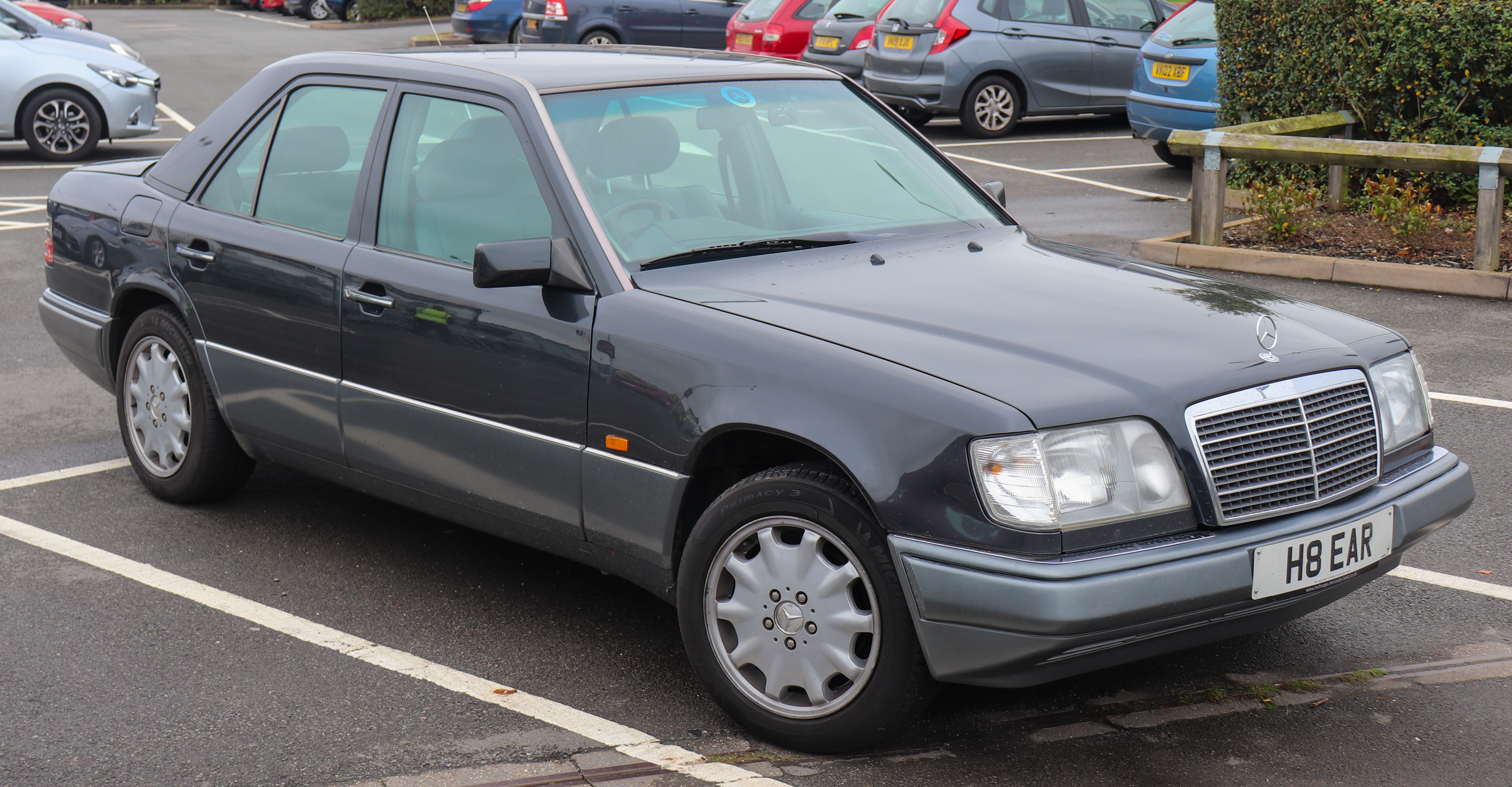
Front (sedan)

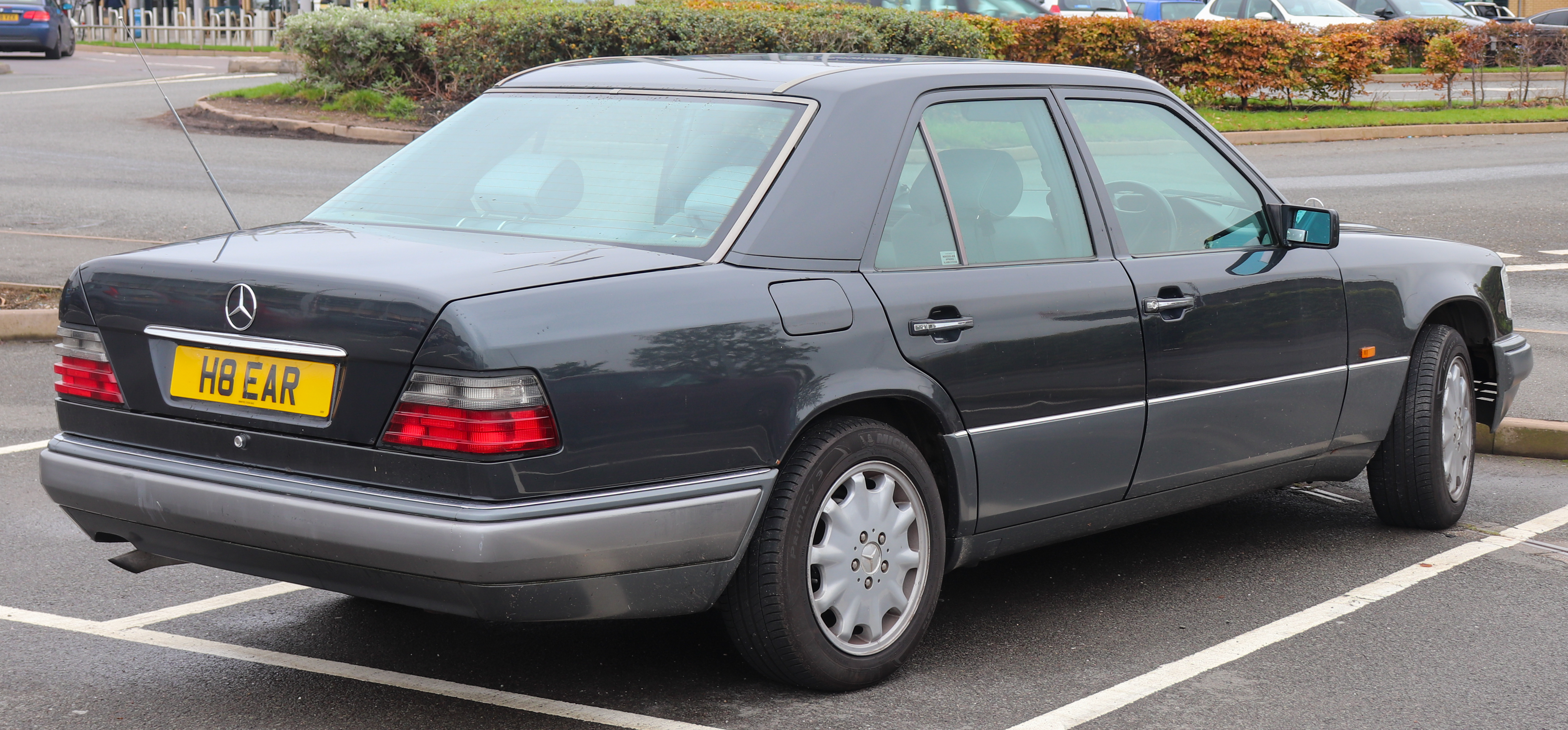
Rear (sedan)

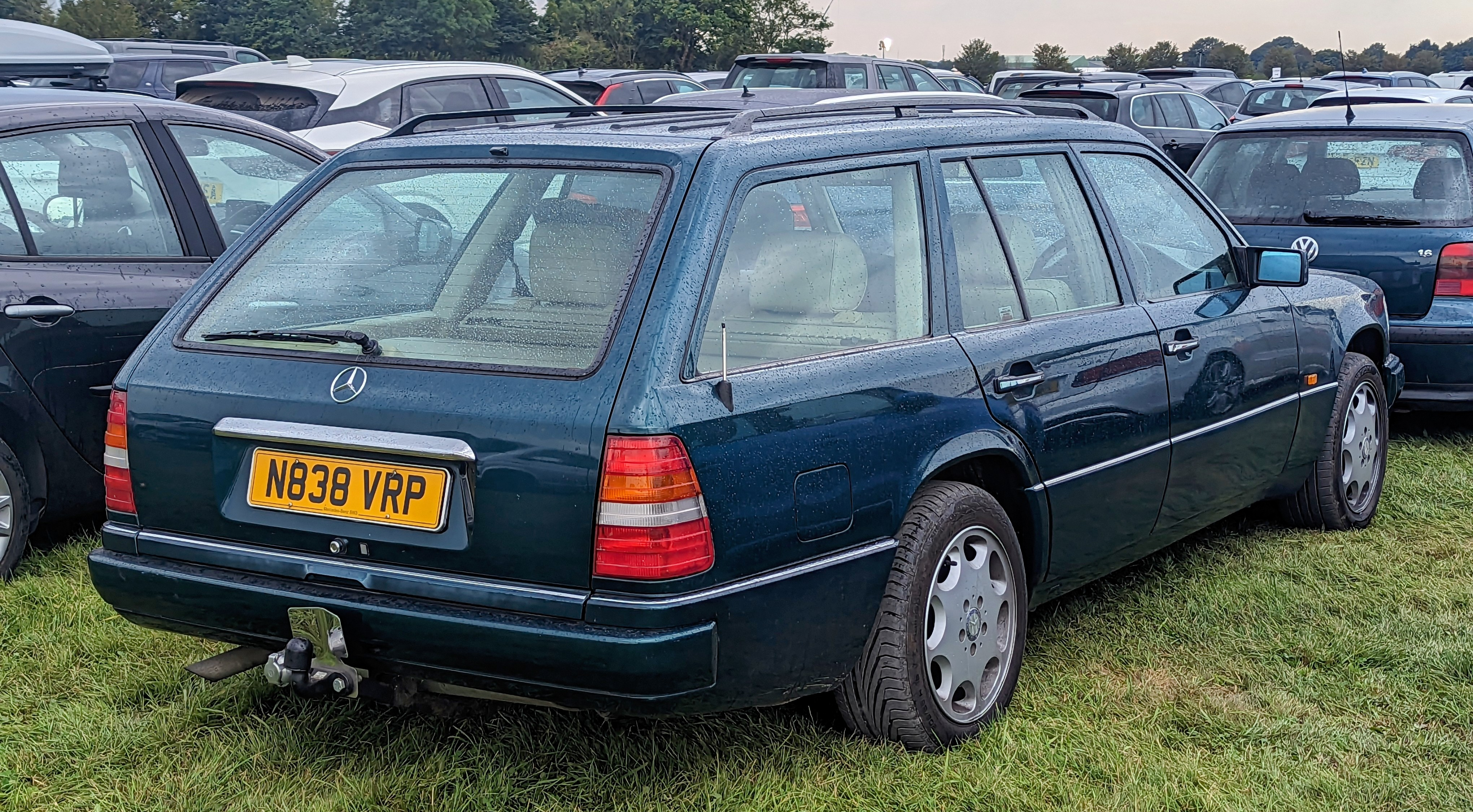
Estate

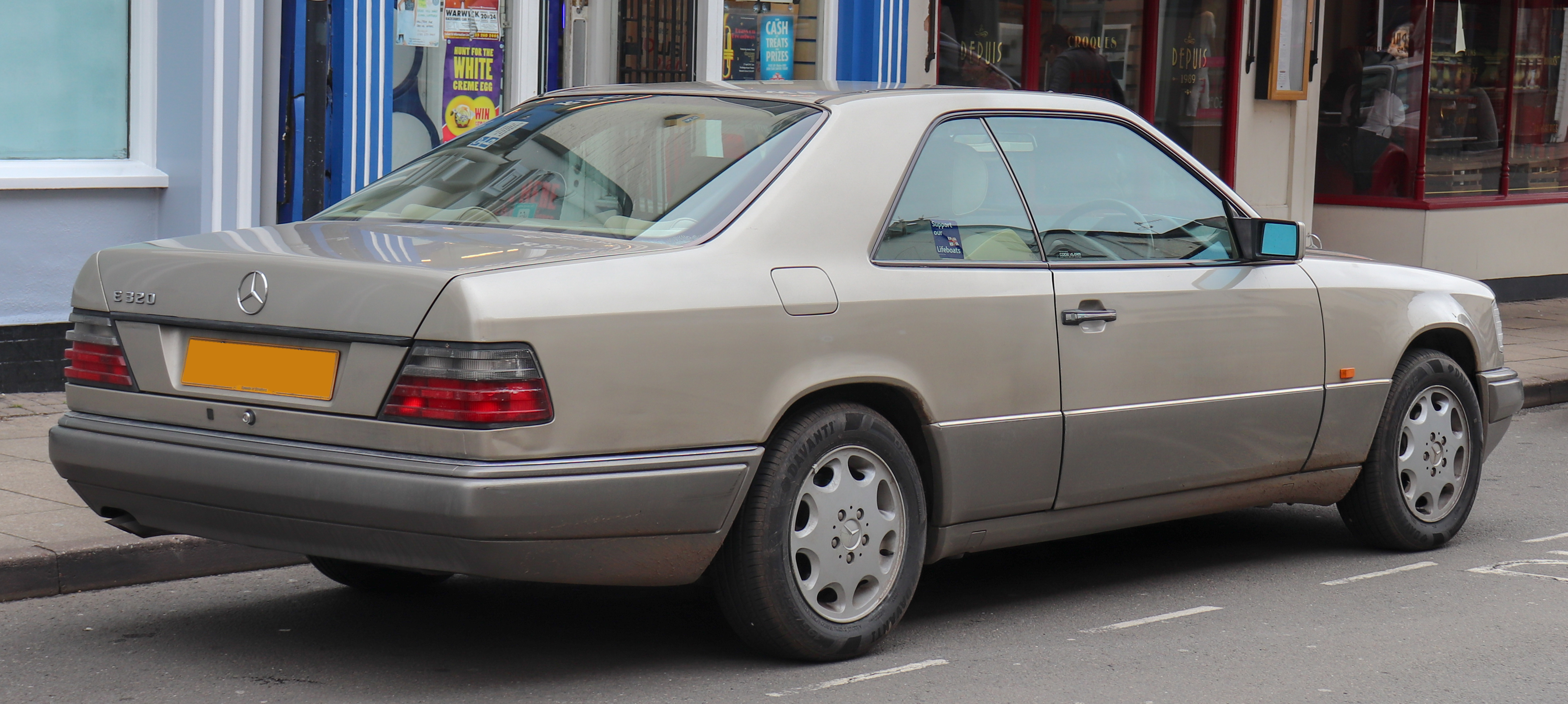
Coupe

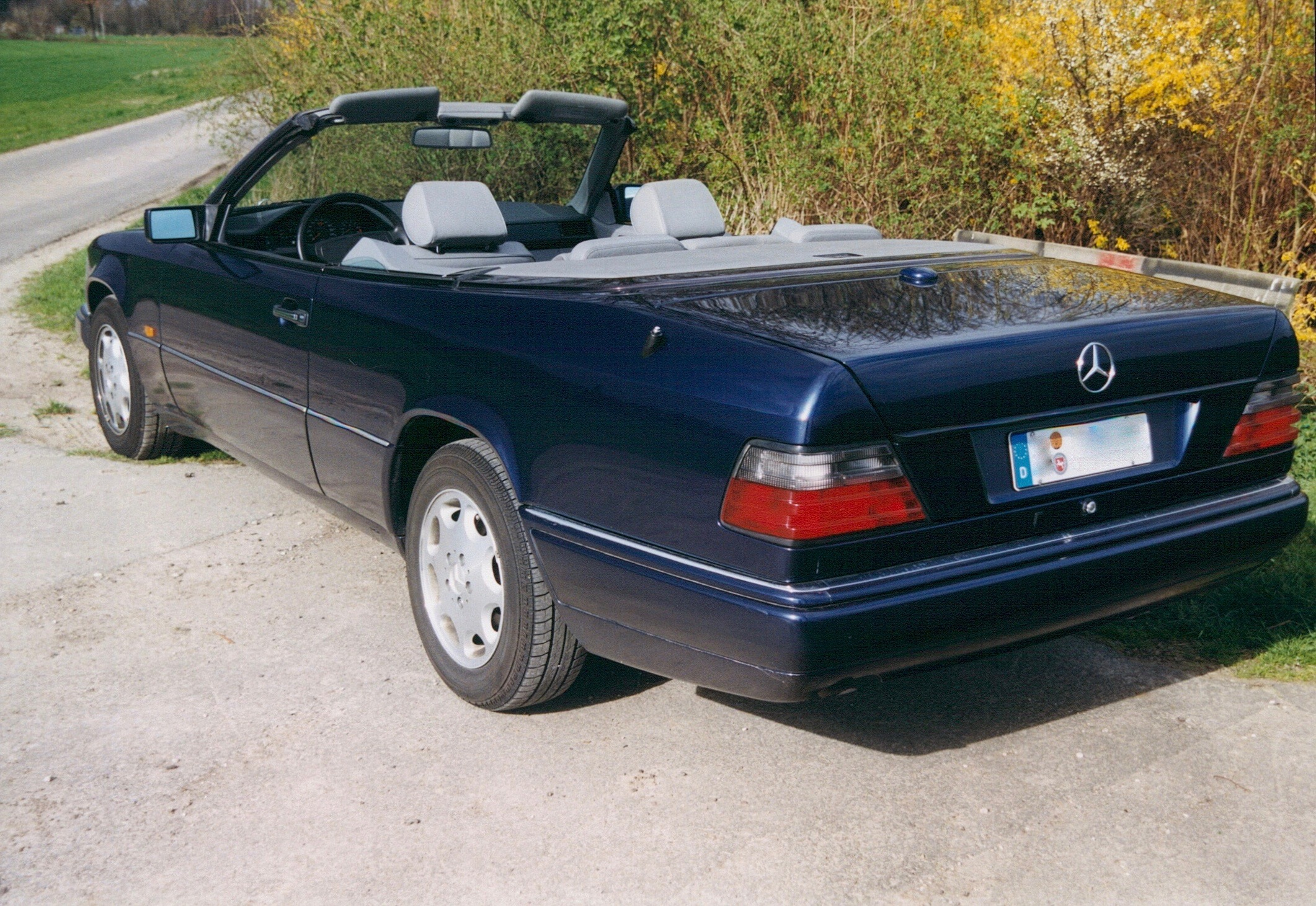
Cabriolet

=== AMG models ===
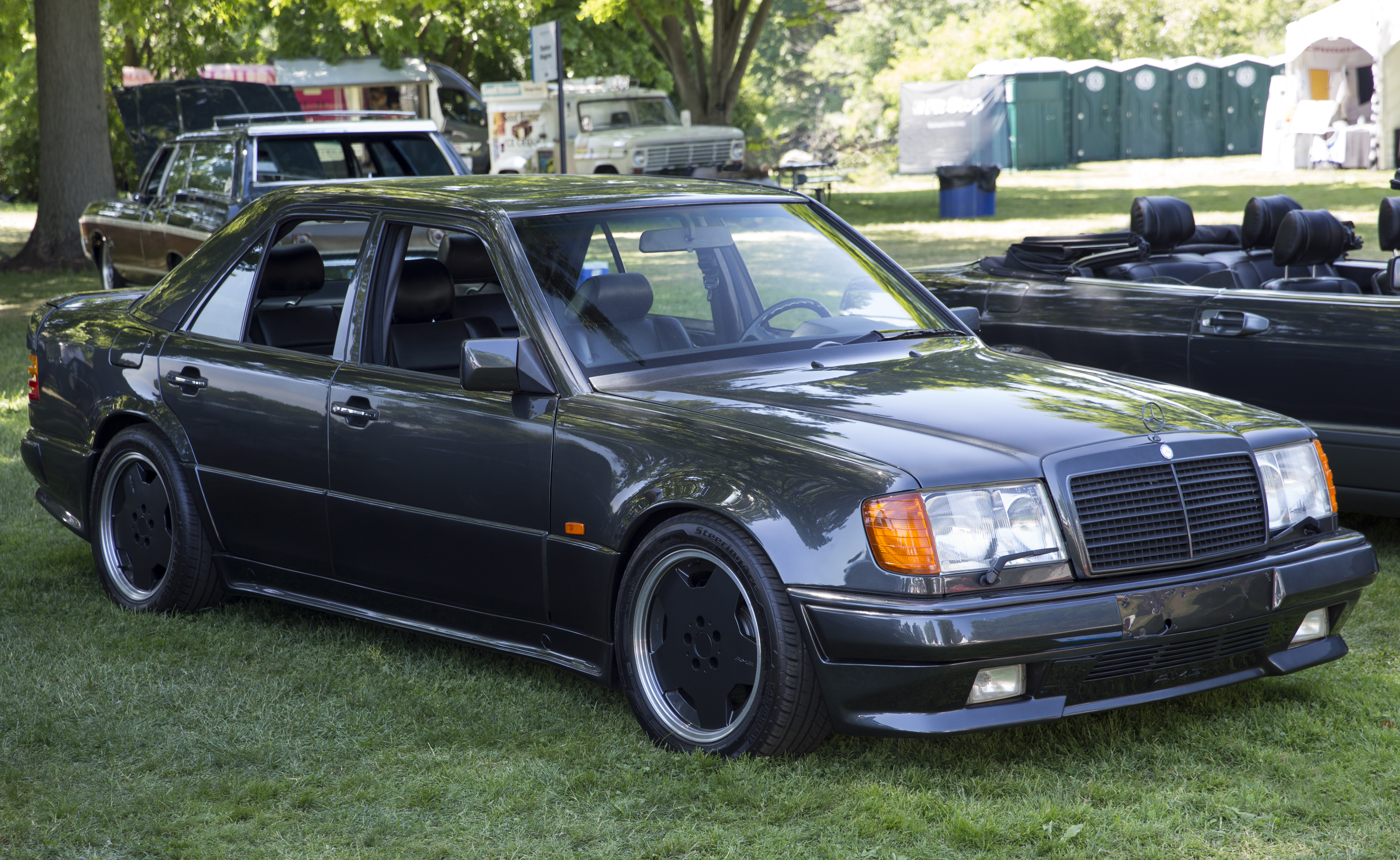
Mercedes-Benz 500E 6.0 AMG Hammer

The relation between Mercedes-Benz, its parent company Daimler and the Affalterbach based AMG was dynamic. Historically, AMG was an independent firm that specialised in both motor racing and aftermarket tuning of Mercedes-Benz models. In the late 1980s, relations between the companies began to converge, particularly with AMG's simultaneous assistance to the DTM entries and expanding its own product line with the AMG Hammer 6.0 model, which was a W124 with a transplanted M117 engine and custom made DOHC cylinder heads along with wide body kits. In 1990, cooperation was made official that AMG aftermarket parts would be offered by Mercedes-Benz on new cars from the dealer. In 1991, this is resulted in a relatively small batch of 300E-24 3.4 AMG where the 3.0 litre M104 motor was bored out to 91.5 mm. This was still sold as an aftermarket trim, but the success of this pilot project led to the full partnership evolving to the 1993 agreement were AMG models would now be featured in Mercedes-Benz showrooms.

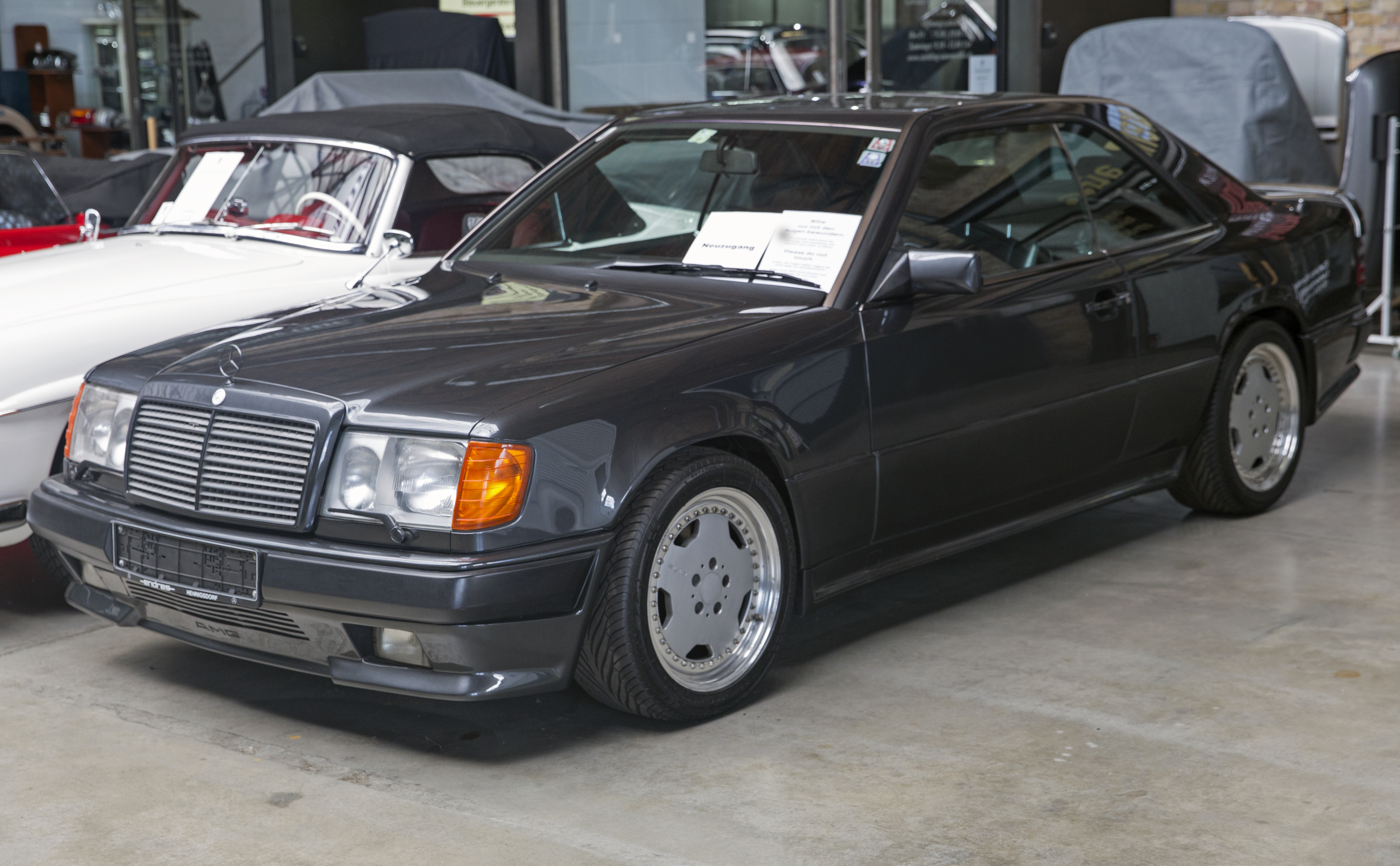
Mercedes-Benz AMG 300CE

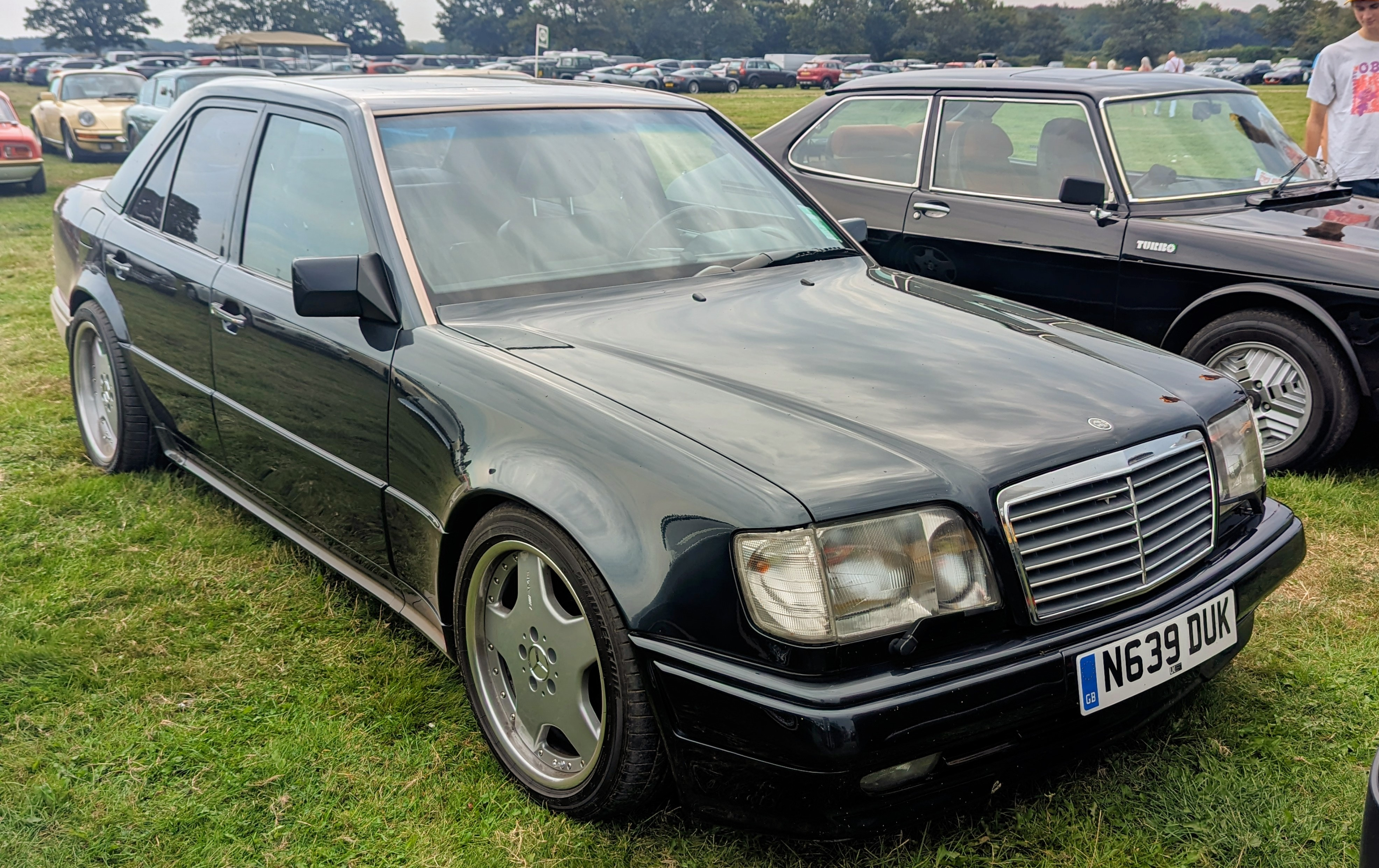
Mercedes-Benz E 60 AMG

The facelifted E-Class was represented by the E36 AMG models for the estate, coupé, and cabriolet, where the 3.2 litre M104 was bored and stroked to an oversquare 91.4 x 92.0, giving a 3604 cc displacement. Combined with a 10.5 compression, racing camshafts, and exhaust system, led to an almost 25% increase in power and torque. Along with tighter suspension, reduced accumulation in shifting pattern, gave the cars a 7.2 second 0-100 km/h (62 mph) time and a 250 km/h (155 mph) electrically limited top speed, as part of the gentleman's agreement between Daimler, BMW and Volkswagen and the Federal Ministry for Digital and Transport to keep the Autobahn limit free.

For the sedan, there was no E36 AMG model, as both the in-house E420 and Porsche assembled E500 were still on offer. However, here AMG too offered a performance upgrade, by treating the M119 engine to 100.0 x 94.8 mm 5956 cc displacement, the result was an 18% rise in power and 24% in torque. This made the E60 AMG the top performing sedan available in the company's lineup, and one of the fastest cars available at the time as the 5.2 0-100 km/h (62 mph) time exceeded the performance of the flagship S600 W140 sedan with the M120 V12 engine.

The total amount of E36 and E60 models remains unknown, as these still remained performance packages to the parent E320 and E500 models, that could be both installed by the dealer upon ordering, hence with Mercedes-Benz warranty, or as an aftermarket upgrade by the customer.

=== 1995–1997: End of production ===
While numerous new technologies were released by Mercedes-Benz across the remainder of their lineup – such as the supercharged Kompressor M111 engines, DOHC diesels, M112 V6 engines, the 5G-tronic transmission, ESP, et cetera – the E-class offerings remained mostly stable post-1993. The E200 coupés and cabriolets, initially only available in Greece, Italy and Portugal, were made available in the home market in February (cabriolet) and December (coupé) of 1994. Model year 1994 was the final year that the 124-series sedan was available in the United States, with the other bodystyles remaining on offer for 1995 as well.

With the debut of the W210 E-class sedan in June 1995, production of the W124 wound down, with the last vehicles leaving Sindelfingen in August. Mercedes Benz officially entered India in 1995; the E250 Diesel and E220 would continue to be supplied as CKD kits to the Chakan plant in India until June of 1996. The estates lingered on until February 1996, with no overlap in production with the S210 estate which debuted in May. Coupés followed in March 1996, whilst the A124 cabriolets would soldier on until July 1997. They did not receive a direct replacement, as Daimler opted to use the smaller W202 C-class platform for the new Mercedes-Benz W208 series (CLK-class) making their respective premieres in January 1997 (Coupé) and March 1998 (Cabriolet).

==== Masterpiece ====
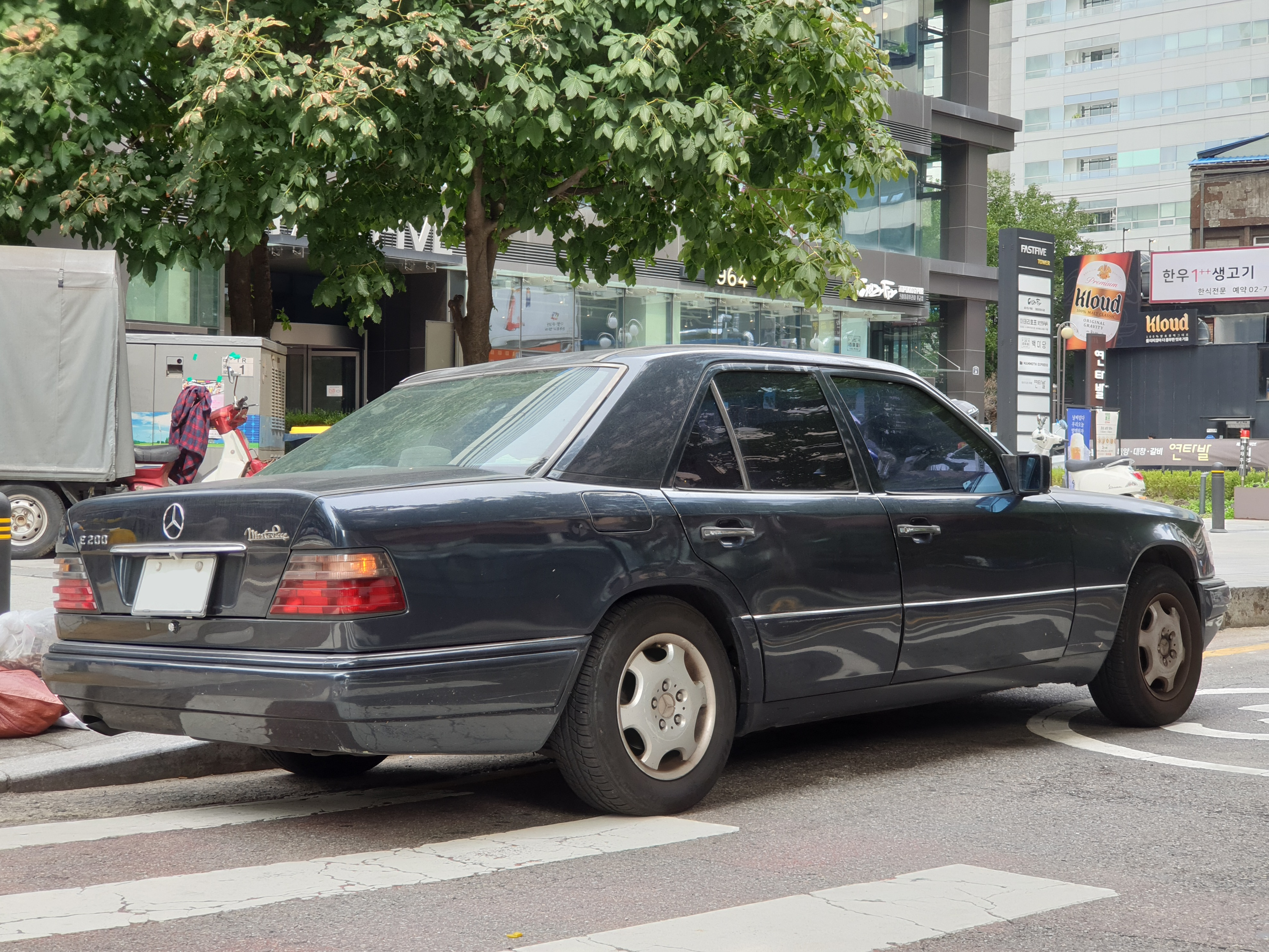
Mercedes-Benz E 200 Masterpiece

In some countries, the final batch of W124 was sold as the limited edition Masterpiece in 1995. Following the impending release of its successor, the Mercedes-Benz W210, the remaining units of W124 were fitted with additional accessories found in stock models such as walnut wood steering wheel (optional), airbag for front passenger, walnut center console glove box, electric rear blind and rear seat side window sunshade (optional). There were also 4 unique pieces of accessories fitted to Masterpieces which were not available to any other W124 around the world – gear knob engraved with the word Masterpiece, stainless door sills engraved with Mercedes Benz, Masterpiece label on the right side of the boot and the new 6-hole light alloy wheels.

== Commercial vehicles ==
As with its predecessors, the W124 platform was adapted for many speciality vehicles. Co-designed with the Binz company, a stretched six-door version was unveiled in 1989. The V124 had an 800 mm long insert at the B-pillar with an additional pair of doors and a forward facing seat bench. Production of the V124 250 D and 260 E began in May 1990, with the latter replaced by the 280 E in July 1992 and re-branded as the E 280 in August 1993. The former got the OM 605 engine of the standard sedan at the August 1993 facelift and also re-branded as the E 250 Diesel. A total of 2,342 six-door limousines were built before production halted in July 1994.

Unlike the predecessors, which were based on the sedans, the higher roofline of the S124 estate made it the more suitable basis for commercial chassis such as ambulances, hearses, vans and motorhomes by speciality companies, such as the aforementioned Binz and also C.Miesen, Visser, Rappold, Pollmann, Stolle, Welsch, and others. These were available in short (F124) and long (VF124) wheelbases, with the latter being 650 mm longer. Parent models were the petrol 230 E and 260 E and the diesel 250 D. The latter two were replaced by the 280 E/E 280 and the OM605 motor E 250 Diesel respectively. A total of 1,266 SWB and 5,132 LWB chassis were built by the end of 1995.

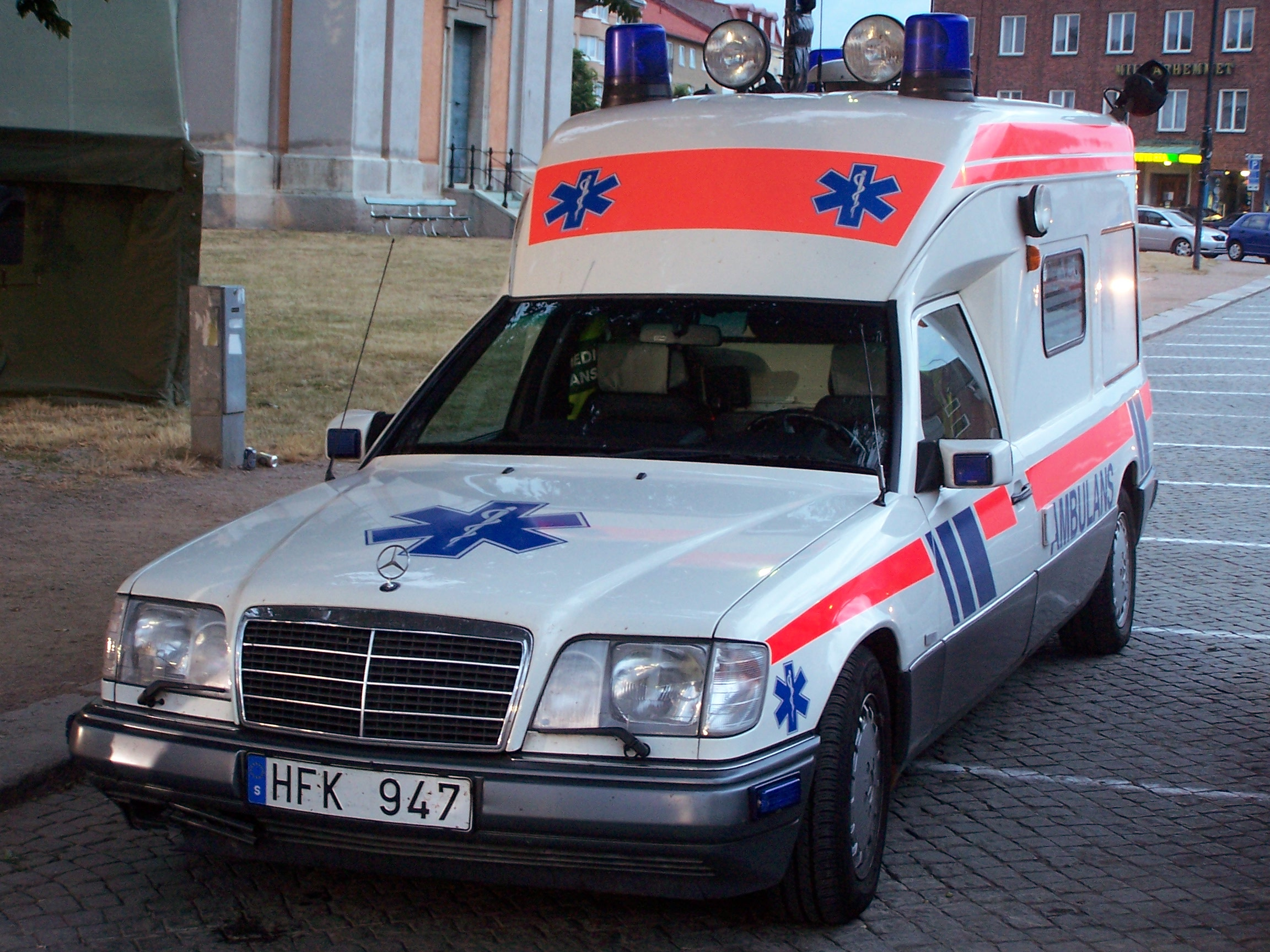
A SWB F124 chassis used as an ambulance in Sweden

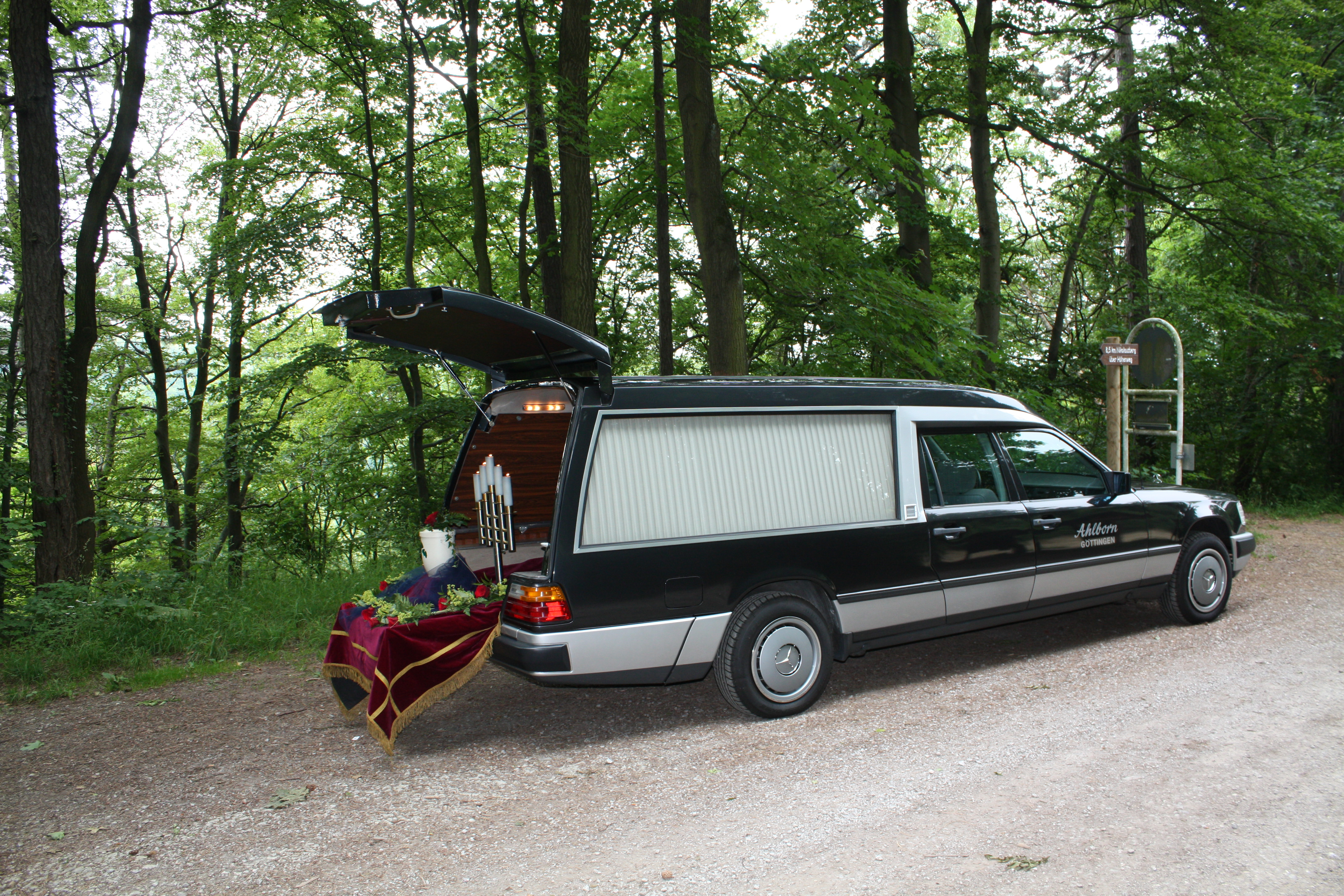
A LWB VF 124 chassis used as hearse in Germany

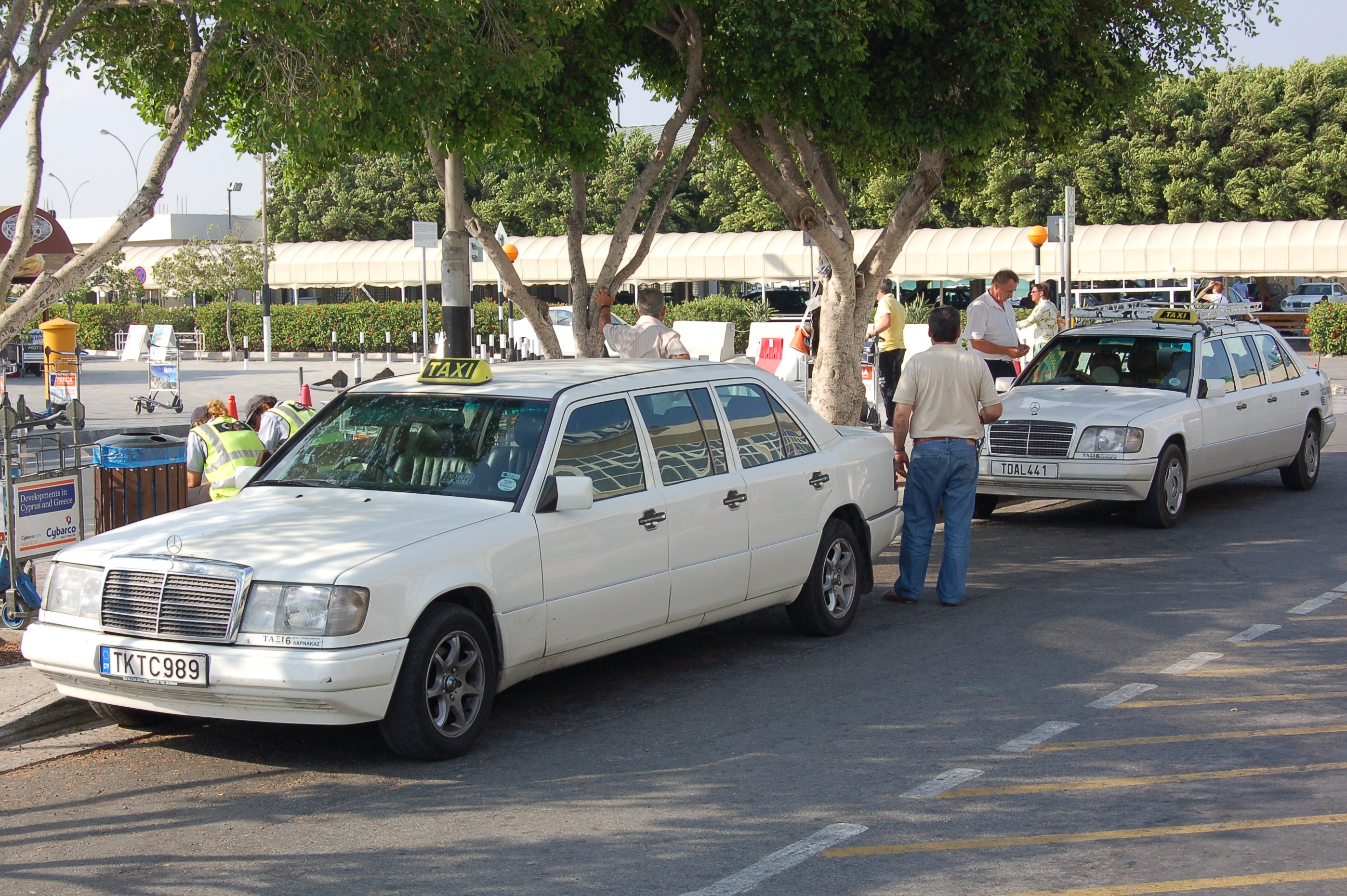
A pair of LWB V124 taxis in Cyprus

== Technical parameters ==
The table gives preproduction to end of production as per Daimler. Daimler lists November 1984 as the start of production for the series but also lists 1985 as part of preproduction for any specific early model. No regular deliveries occurred in 1984.The W124 was also offered as a long wheelbase saloon targeted for taxi companies, but the more luxury equipped version was also used as a limousine.

=== Dimensions and weight ===
Body style	Wheelbase	Length	Width	Height	Curb weight
Sedan/Saloon	2,800 mm (110.2 in)	4,740 mm (186.6 in)	1,740 mm (68.5 in)	1,428 mm (56.2 in); 1,451 mm (57.1 in) (4Matic)	1,390 kg (3,064 lb)
Sedan/Saloon LWB	3,600 mm (141.7 in)	5,540 mm (218.1 in)	1,740 mm (68.5 in)	1,480 mm (58.3 in)	1,635 kg (3,605 lb)
Estate	2,800 mm (110.2 in)	4,765 mm (187.6 in)	1,740 mm (68.5 in)	1,489 mm (58.6 in); 1,498 mm (59.0 in) (4Matic)	1,510 kg (3,329 lb)
Coupé	2,715 mm (106.9 in)	4,655 mm (183.3 in)	1,740 mm (68.5 in)	1,394 mm (54.9 in); 1,391 mm (54.8 in) (convertible)	1,390 kg (3,064 lb)
500 E	2,800 mm (110.2 in)	4,750 mm (187.0 in)	1,796 mm (70.7 in)	1,410 mm (55.5 in)	1,710 kg (3,770 lb)

=== Models ===
Chassis code	Model	Engine	Years	Numbers built	Comment
Petrol engine models, W124 sedan
124.019	200 E	2.0 L M111.940 I4	09.1992–07.1993	82,558	
124.019	E 200	2.0 L M111.940 I4	07.1993–08.1995	82,558	
124.020	200	2.0 L M102.922 I4	01.1985–06.1990	110,354	
124.021	200 E	2.0 L M102.963 I4	07.1985–10.1992	176,660	export model for Italy before 09.1988
124.022	220 E	2.2 L M111.960 I4	05.1992–07.1993	105,345	
124.022	E 220	2.2 L M111.960 I4	07.1993–06.1996	105,345	CKD assembly in India after 09.1995
124.023	230 E	2.3 L M102.982 I4	01.1985–10.1992	374,422	
124.026	260 E	2.6 L M103.940 I6	01.1985–10.1992	154,391	sold as 300 E 2.6 in USA for 1990-92 MY
124.028	280 E	2.8 L M104.942 I6	09.1992–07.1993	57,302	sold as 300 E 2.8 in USA for 1993 MY
124.028	E 280	2.8 L M104.942 I6	07.1993–08.1995	57,302	
124.030	300 E	3.0 L M103.983 I6	04.1985–11.1992	258,063	
124.031	300 E-24	3.0 L M104.980 I6	08.1989–10.1992	19,300	
124.031	300E 3.4 AMG	3.3 L M104.980 I6	08.1989–10.1992	19,300	Converted from 300E-24
124.032	320 E	3.2 L M104.992 I6	09.1992–07.1993	63,950	sold as 300 E in USA for 1993 MY
124.032	E 320	3.2 L M104.992 I6	07.1993–08.1995	63,950	
124.034	400 E	4.2 L M119.975 V8	09.1991–07.1993	22,805	export model to NA and Japan until 08.1992
124.034	E 420	4.2 L M119.975 V8	07.1993–06.1995	22,805	sold as E 400 in Japan
124.036	500 E	5.0 L M119.974 V8	02.1991–07.1993	10,479	
124.036	E 500	5.0 L M119.974 V8	07.1993–04.1995	10,479	
124.036 (options 957, 958)	E 60 AMG	6.0 L M119 E60 V8	09.1993–11.1994	10,479	converted from E 500
Diesel engine models, W124 sedan
124.120	200 D	2.0 L OM601.912 Diesel I4	01.1985–07.1993	236,926	
124.120	E 200 Diesel	2.0 L OM601.912 Diesel I4	07.1993–08.1995	236,926	
124.125	250 D	2.5 L OM602.912 Diesel I5	05.1985–07.1993	236,811	
124.126	E 250 Diesel	2.5 L OM605.911 Diesel I5	07.1993–06.1996	41,411	CKD assembly in India after 09.1995
124.128	250 D Turbo	2.5 L OM602.962 Turbo Diesel I5	08.1988–07.1993	48,876	sold as 300 D 2.5 Turbo in USA for 1990-93 MY
124.128	E 250 Turbodiesel	2.5 L OM602.962 Turbo Diesel I5	07.1993–06.1995	48,876	
124.130	300 D	3.0 L OM603.912 Diesel I6	01.1985–07.1993	131,647	
124.131	E 300 Diesel	3.0 L OM606.910 Diesel I6	07.1993–08.1995	23,166	
124.133	300 D Turbo	3.0 L OM603.960 Turbo Diesel I6	04.1986–07.1993	38,908	export model to NA until 08.1987
124.133	E 300 Turbodiesel	3.0 L OM603.960 Turbo Diesel I6	07.1993–06.1995	38,908	
AWD models, W124 sedan
124.226	260 E 4Matic	2.6 L M103.943 I6	04.1987–06.1991	1,943	
124.230	300 E 4Matic	3.0 L M103.985 I6	04.1987–07.1993	14,202	
124.230	E 300 4Matic	3.0 L M103.985 I6	07.1993–04.1995	14,202	
124.330	300 D 4Matic	3.0 L OM603.913 I6	03.1987–06.1991	1,485	
124.333	300 D Turbo 4Matic	3.0 L OM603.963 I6	03.1988–07.1993	2,136	
124.333	E 300 Turbodiesel 4matic	3.0 L OM603.963 I6	07.1993–03.1995	2,136	
C124 Coupé
124.040	200 CE	2.0 L M111.940 I4	09.1992–07.1993	7,848	export model for Italy, Greece and Portugal until 12.1994
124.040	E 200	2.0 L M111.940 I4	07.1993–03.1996	7,848	export model for Italy, Greece and Portugal until 12.1994
124.041	200 CE	2.0 L M102.963 I4	06.1990–12.1992	5,921	export model for Italy only
124.042	220 CE	2.2 L M111.960 I4	06.1992–07.1993	12,337	
124.042	E 220	2.2 L M111.960 I4	07.1993–03.1996	12,337	
124.043	230 CE	2.3 L M102.982 I4	04.1987–09.1992	33,675	
124.050	300 CE	3.0 L M103.983 I6	04.1987–10.1992	43,486	
124.051	300 CE-24	3.0 L M104.980 I6	09.1989–11.1992	24,463	
124.051	300 CE 3.4 AMG	3.3 L M104.980 I6	09.1989–11.1992	24,463	Converted from 300CE-24
124.052	320 CE	3.2 L M104.992 I6	09.1992–07.1993	13,768	sold as 300 CE in USA for 1993 MY
124.052	E 320	3.2 L M104.992 I6	03.1993–03.1996	13,768	
124.052	E 36 AMG	3.6 L M104.9936 I6	09.1993-05.1996	13,768	Converted from E 320
A124 Cabriolet
124.060	E 200	2.0 L M111.940 I4	07.1993–07.1997	6,922	export model for Italy, Greece and Portugal until 03.1994
124.061	300 CE-24	3.0 L M104.980 I6	03.1992–07.1993	6,343	
124.062	E 220	2.2 L M111.960 I4	06.1993–07.1997	8,458	
124.066	320 CE	3.2 L M104.992 I6	09.1992–07.1993	12,229	Export model to Japan, UK, USA and Ireland; sold as 300 CE in USA for 1993 MY
124.066	E 320	3.2 L M104.992 I6	07.1993–06.1997	12,229	
124.066	E 36 AMG	3.6 L M104.9936 I6	07.1993–06.1997	12,229	Converted from E 320
Petrol engine models, S124 estate
124.079	200 TE	2.0 L M111.940 I4	09.1992–07.1993	15,279	
124.079	E 200	2.0 L M111.940 I4	07.1993–02.1996	15,279	
124.080	200 T	2.0 L M102.922 I4	11.1985–05.1990	7,467	
124.081	200 TE	2.0 L M102.963 I4	10.1988–10.1992	15,279	
124.082	220 TE	2.2 L M111.960 I4	09.1992–07.1993	20,057	
124.082	E 220	2.2 L M111.960 I4	07.1993–02.1996	20,057	
124.083	230 TE	2.3 L M102.982 I4	10.1985–10.1992	64,945	
124.088	280 TE	2.8 L M104.942 I6	09.1992–07.1993	12,177	
124.088	E 280	2.8 L M104.942 I6	07.1993–02.1996	12,177	
124.090	300 TE	3.0 L M103.983 I6	11.1985–10.1992	41,775	
124.091	300 TE-24	3.0 L M104.980 I6	09.1989–10.1992	6,282	
124.091	300 TE 3.4 AMG	3.3 L M104.980 I6	09.1989–10.1992	6,282	Converted from 300CE-24
124.092	320 TE	3.2 L M104.992 I6	07.1992–07.1993	18,368	sold as 300 TE in USA for 1993 MY
124.092	E 320	3.2 L M104.992 I6	07.1993–02.1996	18,368	
124.092	E 36 AMG	3.6 L M104.9936 I6	09.1993–05.1996	18,368	Converted from E 320
Diesel engine models, S124 estate
124.180	200 TD	2.0 L OM601.912 Diesel I4	10.1985–06.1991	7,373	
124.185	250 TD	2.5 L OM602.912 Diesel I5	10.1985–07.1993	43,628	
123.186	E 250 Diesel	2.5 L OM605.911 Diesel I5	07.1993–02.1996	15,625	
124.188	250 TD Turbo	2.5 L OM602.962 Turbo Diesel I5	06.1990–07.1993	4,745	export model for Italy only
124.188	E 250 Turbodiesel	2.5 L OM602.962 Turbo Diesel I5	07.1993–01.1996	4,745	export model for Italy only
124.190	300 TD	3.0 L OM603.912 Diesel I6	08.1986–07.1993	21,901	
124.191	E 300 Diesel	3.0 L OM606.910 Diesel I6	07.1993–02.1996	9,071	
124.193	300 TD Turbo	3.0 L OM603.960 Turbo Diesel I6	06.1986–07.1993	14,844	export model to NA until 08.1987
124.193	E 300 Turbodiesel	3.0 L OM603.960 Turbo Diesel I6	07.1993–02.1996	14,844	
AWD models, S124 estate
124.290	300 TE 4Matic	3.0 L M103.985 I6	04.1987–07.1993	12,094	
124.290	E 300 4Matic	3.0 L M103.985 I6	07.1993–04.1995	12,094	
124.393	300 TD Turbo 4Matic	3.0 L OM603.963 I6	08.1987–07.1993	2,317	
124.393	E 300 Turbodiesel 4Matic	3.0 L OM603.963 I6	07.1993–03.1995	2,317	

=== Engines ===
Engine	Type	Displacement (bore x stroke)	Fuel supply	Power	Torque	0–100 km/h (0-62 mph) (sec.)	Maximum speed	Fuel consumption (urban per 80/1268/EEC)	Notes
Gasoline									
M102.922	I4 SOHC	1997 cc (89.0 × 80.25 mm)	Stromberg 175 CDT	109 PS (80 kW) at 5200 rpm	170 N⋅m (125 lb⋅ft) at 2500 rpm	sedan: 12.6 / 13.1 estate: 13.6 / 14.0	sedan: 187 km/h (116 mph) / 185 km/h (115 mph) estate: 175 km/h (109 mph) / 170 km/h (106 mph)	sedan: 11.2 L/100 km (21.0 mpg_{‑US})/ 11.0 L/100 km (21.4 mpg_{‑US}) estate: 12.2 L/100 km (19.3 mpg_{‑US})/ 11.9 L/100 km (19.8 mpg_{‑US})	ECE
M102.922	I4 SOHC	1997 cc (89.0 × 80.25 mm)	Pierburg 2 E-E	109 PS (80 kW) at 5500 rpm	165 N⋅m (122 lb⋅ft) at 3000 rpm	sedan: 12.6 / 13.1 estate: 13.6 / 14.0	sedan: 187 km/h (116 mph) / 185 km/h (115 mph) estate: 175 km/h (109 mph) / 170 km/h (106 mph)	sedan: 11.0 L/100 km (21.4 mpg_{‑US})/ 10.8 L/100 km (22 mpg_{‑US}) estate: 11.7 L/100 km (20.1 mpg_{‑US})/ 11.5 L/100 km (20.5 mpg_{‑US})	RÜF
M102.922	I4 SOHC	1997 cc (89.0 × 80.25 mm)	Pierburg 2 E-E	105 PS (77 kW) at 5500 rpm	160 N⋅m (118 lb⋅ft) at 3000 rpm	sedan: 13.0 / 13.5 estate: 13.6 / 14.0	sedan: 185 km/h (115 mph) / 180 km/h (112 mph) estate: 173 km/h (107 mph) / 168 km/h (104 mph)	sedan: 11.4 L/100 km (20.6 mpg_{‑US})/ 11.2 L/100 km (21.0 mpg_{‑US}) estate: 12.2 L/100 km (19.3 mpg_{‑US})/ 12.0 L/100 km (19.6 mpg_{‑US})	KAT
M102.922	I4 SOHC	1996 cc (89.0 × 80.2 mm)	Pierburg 2 E-E	105 PS (77 kW) at 5500 rpm	158 N⋅m (117 lb⋅ft) at 3000 rpm	sedan: 13.0 / 13.5 estate: 13.6 / 14.0	sedan: 185 km/h (115 mph) / 180 km/h (112 mph) estate: 173 km/h (107 mph) / 168 km/h (104 mph)	sedan: 11.4 L/100 km (20.6 mpg_{‑US})/ 11.2 L/100 km (21.0 mpg_{‑US}) estate: 12.2 L/100 km (19.3 mpg_{‑US})/ 12.0 L/100 km (19.6 mpg_{‑US})	1989-
M102.963	I4 SOHC	1997 cc (89.0 × 80.25 mm)	Bosch KE-Jetronic	122 PS (90 kW) at 5100 rpm	178 N⋅m (131 lb⋅ft) at 3500 rpm	sedan: 11.4 / 11.8 estate: 12.4 / 12.5	sedan: 195 km/h (121 mph) / 190 km/h (118 mph) estate: 182 km/h (113 mph) / 177 km/h (110 mph)	sedan: 11.0 L/100 km (21.4 mpg_{‑US})/ 10.9 L/100 km (21.6 mpg_{‑US}) estate: 11.7 L/100 km (20.1 mpg_{‑US})/ 11.6 L/100 km (20.3 mpg_{‑US})	RÜF
M102.963	I4 SOHC	1997 cc (89.0 × 80.25 mm)	Bosch KE-Jetronic	118 PS (87 kW) at 5200 rpm	172 N⋅m (127 lb⋅ft) at 3500 rpm	sedan: 12.0 / 12.3 coupé: 12.5 / 12.8 estate: 12.9 / 13.1	sedan & coupé: 193 km/h (120 mph) / 188 km/h (117 mph) estate: 180 km/h (112 mph) / 175 km/h (109 mph)	sedan: 11.4 L/100 km (20.6 mpg_{‑US})/ 11.3 L/100 km (20.8 mpg_{‑US}) coupé: 11.7 L/100 km (20.1 mpg_{‑US})/ 11.4 L/100 km (20.6 mpg_{‑US}) estate: 12.2 L/100 km (19.3 mpg_{‑US})/ 12.0 L/100 km (19.6 mpg_{‑US})	KAT
M102.963	I4 SOHC	1996 cc (89.0 × 80.2 mm)	Bosch KE-Jetronic	118 PS (87 kW) at 5200 rpm	172 N⋅m (127 lb⋅ft) at 3500 rpm	sedan: 12.0 / 12.3 coupé: 12.5 / 12.8 estate: 12.9 / 13.1	sedan & coupé: 193 km/h (120 mph) / 188 km/h (117 mph) estate: 180 km/h (112 mph) / 175 km/h (109 mph)	sedan: 11.4 L/100 km (20.6 mpg_{‑US})/ 11.3 L/100 km (20.8 mpg_{‑US}) coupé: 11.7 L/100 km (20.1 mpg_{‑US})/ 11.4 L/100 km (20.6 mpg_{‑US}) estate: 12.2 L/100 km (19.3 mpg_{‑US})/ 12.0 L/100 km (19.6 mpg_{‑US})	1989-
M102.982	I4 SOHC	2299 cc (95.5 × 80.25 mm)	Bosch KE-Jetronic	136 PS (100 kW) at 5100 rpm	205 N⋅m (151 lb⋅ft) at 3500 rpm	sedan: 10.4 estate: 10.9 / 10.4	sedan: 203 km/h (126 mph) / 198 km/h (123 mph) estate: 190 km/h (118 mph) / 185 km/h (115 mph)	sedan: 11.1 L/100 km (21.2 mpg_{‑US})/ 10.9 L/100 km (21.6 mpg_{‑US}) estate: 11.8 L/100 km (19.9 mpg_{‑US})/ 11.6 L/100 km (20.3 mpg_{‑US})	ECE
M102.982	I4 SOHC	2299 cc (95.5 × 80.25 mm)	Bosch KE-Jetronic	136 PS (100 kW) at 5100 rpm	205 N⋅m (151 lb⋅ft) at 3500 rpm	sedan & coupé: 10.6 estate: 11.4 / 10.6	sedan & coupé: 200 km/h (124 mph) / 195 km/h (121 mph) estate: 188 km/h (117 mph) / 183 km/h (114 mph)	sedan: 11.7 L/100 km (20.1 mpg_{‑US})/ 11.4 L/100 km (20.6 mpg_{‑US}) coupé: 11.4 L/100 km (20.6 mpg_{‑US}) estate: 12.2 L/100 km (19.3 mpg_{‑US})/ 12.0 L/100 km (19.6 mpg_{‑US})	RÜF
M102.982	I4 SOHC	2299 cc (95.5 × 80.25 mm)	Bosch KE-Jetronic	132 PS (97 kW) at 5100 rpm	198 N⋅m (146 lb⋅ft) at 3500 rpm	sedan & coupé: 11.1 / 11.2 estate: 11.8 / 11.5	sedan & coupé: 200 km/h (124 mph) / 195 km/h (121 mph) estate: 188 km/h (117 mph) / 183 km/h (114 mph)	sedan: 11.7 L/100 km (20.1 mpg_{‑US})/ 11.4 L/100 km (20.6 mpg_{‑US}) coupé: 11.4 L/100 km (20.6 mpg_{‑US}) estate: 12.5 L/100 km (18.8 mpg_{‑US})/ 12.0 L/100 km (19.6 mpg_{‑US})	KAT
M102.982	I4 SOHC	2298 cc (95.5 × 80.2 mm)	Bosch KE-Jetronic	132 PS (97 kW) at 5100 rpm	198 N⋅m (146 lb⋅ft) at 3500 rpm	sedan & coupé: 11.1 / 11.2 estate: 11.8 / 11.5	sedan & coupé: 200 km/h (124 mph) / 195 km/h (121 mph) estate: 188 km/h (117 mph) / 183 km/h (114 mph)	sedan: 11.7 L/100 km (20.1 mpg_{‑US})/ 11.4 L/100 km (20.6 mpg_{‑US}) coupé: 11.4 L/100 km (20.6 mpg_{‑US}) estate: 12.5 L/100 km (18.8 mpg_{‑US})/ 12.0 L/100 km (19.6 mpg_{‑US})	1989-
M111.940	I4 DOHC	1998 cc (89.9 × 78.7 mm)	Siemens PMS	136 PS (100 kW) at 5500 rpm	190 N⋅m (140 lb⋅ft) at 4000 rpm	sedan & coupé: 11.5 / 12.0 cabriolet: 13.3 / 13.9 estate: 11.6 / 12.1	sedan, coupé & cabrio: 200 km/h (124 mph) / 195 km/h (121 mph) estate: 188 km/h (117 mph) / 183 km/h (114 mph)	sedan: 11.3 L/100 km (20.8 mpg_{‑US})/ 11.4 L/100 km (20.6 mpg_{‑US}) coupé: 11.6 L/100 km (20.3 mpg_{‑US}) 11.4 L/100 km (20.6 mpg_{‑US}) cabriolet & estate: 11.9 L/100 km (19.8 mpg_{‑US})/ 11.7 L/100 km (20.1 mpg_{‑US})	
M111.960	I4 DOHC	2199 cc (89.9 × 86.6 mm)	Bosch HFM	150 PS (110 kW) at 5500 rpm	210 N⋅m (155 lb⋅ft) at 4000 rpm	sedan & coupé: 10.6 cabriolet: 11.9 / 11.5 estate: 10.8 / 11.1	sedan, coupé & cabrio: 210 km/h (130 mph) / 205 km/h (127 mph) estate: 198 km/h (123 mph) / 193 km/h (120 mph)	sedan: 11.4 L/100 km (20.6 mpg_{‑US})/ 11.2 L/100 km (21.0 mpg_{‑US}) coupé: 12.0 L/100 km (19.6 mpg_{‑US}) 11.2 L/100 km (21.0 mpg_{‑US}) cabriolet: 12.3 L/100 km (19.1 mpg_{‑US})/ 11.5 L/100 km (20.5 mpg_{‑US}) estate: 12.2 L/100 km (19.3 mpg_{‑US})/ 11.6 L/100 km (20.3 mpg_{‑US})	
M103.940	I6 SOHC	2599 cc (82.9 × 80.25 mm)	Bosch KE-Jetronic	170 PS (125 kW) at 5800 rpm	230 N⋅m (170 lb⋅ft) at 4500 rpm	8.7 / 9.5	218 km/h (135 mph) / 213 km/h (132 mph)	12.4 L/100 km (19.0 mpg_{‑US})/ 12.1 L/100 km (19.4 mpg_{‑US})	ECE
M103.940	I6 SOHC	2599 cc (82.9 × 80.25 mm)	Bosch KE-Jetronic	166 PS (122 kW) at 5800 rpm	228 N⋅m (168 lb⋅ft) at 4600 rpm	8.7 / 9.5	218 km/h (135 mph) / 213 km/h (132 mph)	12.4 L/100 km (19.0 mpg_{‑US})/ 12.1 L/100 km (19.4 mpg_{‑US})	RÜF
M103.940	I6 SOHC	2599 cc (82.9 × 80.25 mm)	Bosch KE-Jetronic	160 PS (118 kW) at 5800 rpm	220 N⋅m (162 lb⋅ft) at 4600 rpm	9.0 / 9.8	215 km/h (134 mph) / 210 km/h (130 mph)	12.9 L/100 km (18.2 mpg_{‑US})/ 12.6 L/100 km (18.7 mpg_{‑US})	KAT
M103.940	I6 SOHC	2597 cc (82.9 × 80.2 mm)	Bosch KE-Jetronic	160 PS (118 kW) at 5800 rpm	220 N⋅m (162 lb⋅ft) at 4600 rpm	9.8	215 km/h (134 mph) / 210 km/h (130 mph)	14.5 L/100 km (16.2 mpg_{‑US})	1989-
M103.985	I6 SOHC	2962 cc (88.5 × 80.25 mm)	Bosch KE-Jetronic	190 PS (140 kW) at 5600 rpm	260 N⋅m (192 lb⋅ft) at 4250 rpm	sedan: 7.9 / 8.2	sedan: 230 km/h (143 mph) / 225 km/h (140 mph)	sedan: 12.1 L/100 km (19.4 mpg_{‑US})/ 11.9 L/100 km (19.8 mpg_{‑US})	ECE
M103.985	I6 SOHC	2962 cc (88.5 × 80.25 mm)	Bosch KE-Jetronic	188 PS (138 kW) at 5700 rpm	260 N⋅m (192 lb⋅ft) at 4400 rpm	sedan & coupé: 7.9 / 8.3 estate: 8.2 / 8.8	sedan & coupé: 228 km/h (142 mph) / 223 km/h (139 mph) estate: 215 km/h (134 mph) / 210 km/h (130 mph)	sedan: 12.7 L/100 km (18.5 mpg_{‑US})/ 12.8 L/100 km (18.4 mpg_{‑US}) coupé: 13.0 L/100 km (18.1 mpg_{‑US})/ 12.8 L/100 km (18.4 mpg_{‑US}) estate: 13.8 L/100 km (17.0 mpg_{‑US})/ 13.5 L/100 km (17.4 mpg_{‑US})	RÜF
M103.985	I6 SOHC	2962 cc (88.5 × 80.25 mm)	Bosch KE-Jetronic	180 PS (132 kW) at 5700 rpm	255 N⋅m (188 lb⋅ft) at 4400 rpm	sedan & coupé: 8.1 / 8.5 estate: 8.4 / 9.0	sedan & coupé: 225 km/h (140 mph)/ 220 km/h (137 mph) estate: 212 km/h (132 mph) / 207 km/h (129 mph)	sedan: 13.2 L/100 km (17.8 mpg_{‑US})/ 13.3 L/100 km (17.7 mpg_{‑US}) coupé: 13.5 L/100 km (17.4 mpg_{‑US})/ 13.3 L/100 km (17.7 mpg_{‑US}) estate: 14.2 L/100 km (16.6 mpg_{‑US})/ 13.8 L/100 km (17.0 mpg_{‑US})	KAT
M103.985	I6 SOHC	2960 cc (88.5 × 80.2 mm)	Bosch KE-Jetronic	180 PS (132 kW) at 5700 rpm	255 N⋅m (188 lb⋅ft) at 4400 rpm	sedan: 8.2 / 8.5 coupé: 7.9 / 8.5 estate: 9.1	sedan & coupé: 225 km/h (140 mph)/ 220 km/h (137 mph) estate: 212 km/h (132 mph) / 207 km/h (129 mph)	sedan & coupé: 14.6 L/100 km (16.1 mpg_{‑US})/ 13.3 L/100 km (17.7 mpg_{‑US}) estate: 15.2 L/100 km (15.5 mpg_{‑US})/ 13.8 L/100 km (17.0 mpg_{‑US})	1989-
M104.980	I6 DOHC	2960 cc (88.5 × 80.2 mm)	Bosch KE-Jetronic	220 PS (162 kW) at 6400 rpm	265 N⋅m (195 lb⋅ft) at 4600 rpm	sedan & coupé: 8.0 / 7.8 cabrio: 9.0 / 8.8 estate: 8.2 / 8.3	sedan & coupé: 237 km/h (147 mph)/ 232 km/h (144 mph) cabriolet: 235 km/h (146 mph)/ 230 km/h (143 mph) estate: 222 km/h (138 mph)/ 217 km/h (135 mph)	sedan & coupé: 14.8 L/100 km (15.9 mpg_{‑US})/ 14.6 L/100 km (16.1 mpg_{‑US}) cabrio: 15.4 L/100 km (15.3 mpg_{‑US})/ 15.2 L/100 km (15.5 mpg_{‑US}) estate: 15.5 L/100 km (15.2 mpg_{‑US})/ 15.2 L/100 km (15.5 mpg_{‑US})	
M104.980	I6 DOHC	3314 cc (91.5 × 84 mm)	Bosch KE-Jetronic	268 PS (197 kW) at 6500 rpm	330 N⋅m (243 lb⋅ft) at 4600 rpm	sedan & coupé: 5.9 estate: 6.4	sedan & coupé: 250 km/h (155 mph) estate: 245 km/h (152 mph)	sedan & coupé: 17.6 L/100 km (13.4 mpg_{‑US}) estate: 18.3 L/100 km (12.9 mpg_{‑US})	AMG
M104.942	I6 DOHC	2799 cc (89.9 × 73.5 mm)	Bosch HFM	197 PS (145 kW) at 5500 rpm	270 N⋅m (199 lb⋅ft) at 3750 rpm	sedan: 9.1 / 8.8 estate: 9.4 / 9.2	sedan: 230 km/h (143 mph) / 225 km/h (140 mph) estate: 218 km/h (135 mph) / 213 km/h (132 mph)	sedan: 14.6 L/100 km (16.1 mpg_{‑US})/ 13.8 L/100 km (17.0 mpg_{‑US}) estate: 14.8 L/100 km (15.9 mpg_{‑US})/ 14.4 L/100 km (16.3 mpg_{‑US})	
M104.992	I6 DOHC	3199 cc (89.9 × 84.0 mm)	Bosch HFM	220 PS (162 kW) at 5500 rpm	310 N⋅m (229 lb⋅ft) at 3750 rpm	sedan & coupé: 7.9 / 8.3 cabrio: 9.2 / 8.5 estate: 8.6 / 8.2	sedan, coupé & cabrio: 235 km/h (146 mph)/ 230 km/h (143 mph) estate: 225 km/h (140 mph)/ 220 km/h (137 mph)	sedan & coupé: 14.7 L/100 km (16.0 mpg_{‑US})/ 14.6 L/100 km (16.1 mpg_{‑US}) cabrio: 15.4 L/100 km (15.3 mpg_{‑US})/ 15.1 L/100 km (15.6 mpg_{‑US}) estate: 15.1 L/100 km (15.6 mpg_{‑US})/ 14.6 L/100 km (16.1 mpg_{‑US})	
M104.9936	I6 DOHC	3604 cc (91 × 92.4 mm)	Bosch HFM	272 PS (200 kW) at 5750 rpm	385 N⋅m (284 lb⋅ft) at 3750-4500 rpm	coupé: 7.0 cabrio & estate: 7.2	250 km/h (155 mph)	coupé: 13.4 L/100 km (17.6 mpg_{‑US}) cabriolet: 13.8 L/100 km (17.0 mpg_{‑US}) cabriolet: 14.0 L/100 km (16.8 mpg_{‑US})	AMG
M119.975	V8 DOHC	4196 cc (92 × 78.9 mm)	Bosch LH-Jetronic	279 PS (205 kW) at 5700 rpm	400 N⋅m (295 lb⋅ft) at 3900 rpm	7.2	250 km/h (155 mph)	15.0 L/100 km (15.7 mpg_{‑US})	
M119.974	V8 DOHC	4973 cc (96.5 × 85 mm)	Bosch LH-Jetronic	326 PS (240 kW) at 5700 rpm	480 N⋅m (354 lb⋅ft) at 3900 rpm	6.1	250 km/h (155 mph)	17.5 L/100 km (13.4 mpg_{‑US})	
M119.974	V8 DOHC	4973 cc (96.5 × 85 mm)	Bosch LH-Jetronic	320 PS (235 kW) at 5600 rpm	470 N⋅m (347 lb⋅ft) at 3900 rpm	6.1	250 km/h (155 mph)	16.9 L/100 km (13.9 mpg_{‑US})	
M119 E60	V8 DOHC	5956 cc (100.00 × 94.8 mm)	Bosch LH-Jetronic	381 PS (280 kW) at 5500 rpm	580 N⋅m (428 lb⋅ft) at 3750 rpm	5.4	250 km/h (155 mph)	16.1 L/100 km (14.6 mpg_{‑US})	AMG
Diesel									
OM601.912	I4 SOHC	1997 cc (87.0 × 84 mm)	Bosch PES indirect	72 PS (53 kW) at 4600 rpm	123 N⋅m (91 lb⋅ft) at 2800 rpm	sedan: 18.5 / 20.4 estate: 21.7 / 23.0	sedan: 160 km/h (99 mph) / 155 km/h (96 mph) estate: 150 km/h (93 mph) / 145 km/h (90 mph)	sedan: 8.4 L/100 km (28 mpg_{‑US})/ 8.0 L/100 km (29 mpg_{‑US}) estate: 8.7 L/100 km (27 mpg_{‑US})/ 8.5 L/100 km (28 mpg_{‑US})	
OM601.912	I4 SOHC	1997 cc (87.0 × 84 mm)	Bosch PES indirect angled	75 PS (55 kW) at 4600 rpm	126 N⋅m (93 lb⋅ft) at 2700-3550 rpm	sedan: 18.5 / 20.4 estate: 21.7 / 23.0	sedan: 160 km/h (99 mph) / 155 km/h (96 mph) estate: 150 km/h (93 mph) / 145 km/h (90 mph)	sedan: 8.4 L/100 km (28 mpg_{‑US})/ 8.0 L/100 km (29 mpg_{‑US}) estate: 8.7 L/100 km (27 mpg_{‑US})/ 8.5 L/100 km (28 mpg_{‑US})	KAT
OM602.912	I5 SOHC	2497 cc (87.0 × 84 mm)	Bosch PES indirect	90 PS (66 kW) at 4600 rpm	154 N⋅m (114 lb⋅ft) at 2800 rpm	sedan: 16.5 / 17.0 estate: 17.6 / 18.8	sedan: 175 km/h (109 mph) / 170 km/h (106 mph) estate: 165 km/h (103 mph) / 160 km/h (99 mph)	sedan: 8.9 L/100 km (26 mpg_{‑US})/ 8.8 L/100 km (27 mpg_{‑US}) estate: 9.5 L/100 km (25 mpg_{‑US})/ 9.3 L/100 km (25 mpg_{‑US})	
OM602.912	I5 SOHC	2497 cc (87.0 × 84 mm)	Bosch PES indirect angled	94 PS (69 kW) at 4600 rpm	158 N⋅m (117 lb⋅ft) at 2600-3100 rpm	sedan: 16.5 / 17.0 estate: 17.6 / 18.8	sedan: 175 km/h (109 mph) / 170 km/h (106 mph) estate: 165 km/h (103 mph) / 160 km/h (99 mph)	sedan: 8.9 L/100 km (26 mpg_{‑US})/ 8.8 L/100 km (27 mpg_{‑US}) estate: 9.5 L/100 km (25 mpg_{‑US})/ 9.3 L/100 km (25 mpg_{‑US})	KAT
OM602.962	I5 SOHC Turbocharged	2497 cc (87.0 × 84 mm)	Bosch PES indirect	122 PS (90 kW) at 4600 rpm	225 N⋅m (166 lb⋅ft) at 2800 rpm	sedan: 12.3 estate: 12.9	sedan: 198 km/h (123 mph) / 195 km/h (121 mph) estate: 190 km/h (118 mph) / 185 km/h (115 mph)	sedan: 9.6 L/100 km (25 mpg_{‑US})/ 9.2 L/100 km (26 mpg_{‑US}) estate: 10.1 L/100 km (23 mpg_{‑US})/	
OM602.962	I5 SOHC Turbocharged	2497 cc (87.0 × 84 mm)	Bosch PES indirect angled	128 PS (94 kW) at 4600 rpm	231 N⋅m (170 lb⋅ft) at 2800 rpm	sedan: 12.3 estate: 12.9	sedan: 198 km/h (123 mph) / 195 km/h (121 mph) estate: 190 km/h (118 mph) / 185 km/h (115 mph)	sedan: 9.6 L/100 km (25 mpg_{‑US})/ 9.2 L/100 km (26 mpg_{‑US}) estate: 10.1 L/100 km (23 mpg_{‑US})/	KAT
OM603.912	I6 SOHC	2996 cc (87.0 × 84 mm)	Bosch PES indirect	109 PS (80 kW) at 4600 rpm	185 N⋅m (136 lb⋅ft) at 2800 rpm	sedan: 13.7 / 14.1 estate: 14.6 / 15.3	sedan: 190 km/h (118 mph) / 185 km/h (115 mph) estate: 180 km/h (112 mph) / 175 km/h (109 mph)	sedan: 9.8 L/100 km (24 mpg_{‑US})/ 9.3 L/100 km (25 mpg_{‑US}) estate: 9.9 L/100 km (24 mpg_{‑US})/ 9.4 L/100 km (25 mpg_{‑US})	
OM603.912	I6 SOHC	2996 cc (87.0 × 84 mm)	Bosch PES indirect angled	113 PS (83 kW) at 4600 rpm	191 N⋅m (141 lb⋅ft) at 2800-3050 rpm	sedan: 13.7 / 14.1 estate: 14.6 / 15.3	sedan: 190 km/h (118 mph) / 185 km/h (115 mph) estate: 180 km/h (112 mph) / 175 km/h (109 mph)	sedan: 9.8 L/100 km (24 mpg_{‑US})/ 9.3 L/100 km (25 mpg_{‑US}) estate: 9.9 L/100 km (24 mpg_{‑US})/ 9.4 L/100 km (25 mpg_{‑US})	KAT
OM603.960	I6 SOHC Turbocharged	2996 cc (87.0 × 84 mm)	Bosch PES indirect	143 PS (105 kW) at 4600 rpm	267 N⋅m (197 lb⋅ft) at 2800 rpm	10.9	sedan: 202 km/h (126 mph) estate: 195 km/h (121 mph)	sedan: 9.3 L/100 km (25 mpg_{‑US}) estate: 9.4 L/100 km (25 mpg_{‑US})	
OM603.960	I6 SOHC Turbocharged	2996 cc (87.0 × 84 mm)	Bosch PES indirect angled	147 PS (108 kW) at 4600 rpm	273 N⋅m (201 lb⋅ft) at 2800 rpm	10.9	sedan: 202 km/h (126 mph) estate: 195 km/h (121 mph)	sedan: 9.3 L/100 km (25 mpg_{‑US}) estate: 9.4 L/100 km (25 mpg_{‑US})	KAT
OM605.911	I5 DOHC	2497 cc (87.0 × 84 mm)	Bosch PES/M RSF indirect	113 PS (83 kW) at 5000 rpm	173 N⋅m (128 lb⋅ft) at 2000-4600 rpm	sedan: 15.6 / 16.0 estate: 16.3 / 17.0	sedan: 190 km/h (118 mph) / 187 km/h (116 mph) estate: 180 km/h (112 mph) / 177 km/h (110 mph)	sedan: 9.1 L/100 km (26 mpg_{‑US})/ 8.8 L/100 km (27 mpg_{‑US}) estate: 9.5 L/100 km (25 mpg_{‑US})/ 9.3 L/100 km (25 mpg_{‑US})	
OM606.910	I6 DOHC	2996 cc (87.0 × 84 mm)	Bosch PES/M RSF indirect	136 PS (100 kW) at 5000 rpm	210 N⋅m (155 lb⋅ft) at 2200-4600 rpm	sedan: 13.0 estate: 13.7	200 km/h (124 mph) / 197 km/h (122 mph)	sedan: 9.8 L/100 km (24 mpg_{‑US})/ 9.3 L/100 km (25 mpg_{‑US}) estate: 9.9 L/100 km (24 mpg_{‑US})/ 9.4 L/100 km (25 mpg_{‑US})	

== Build quality ==
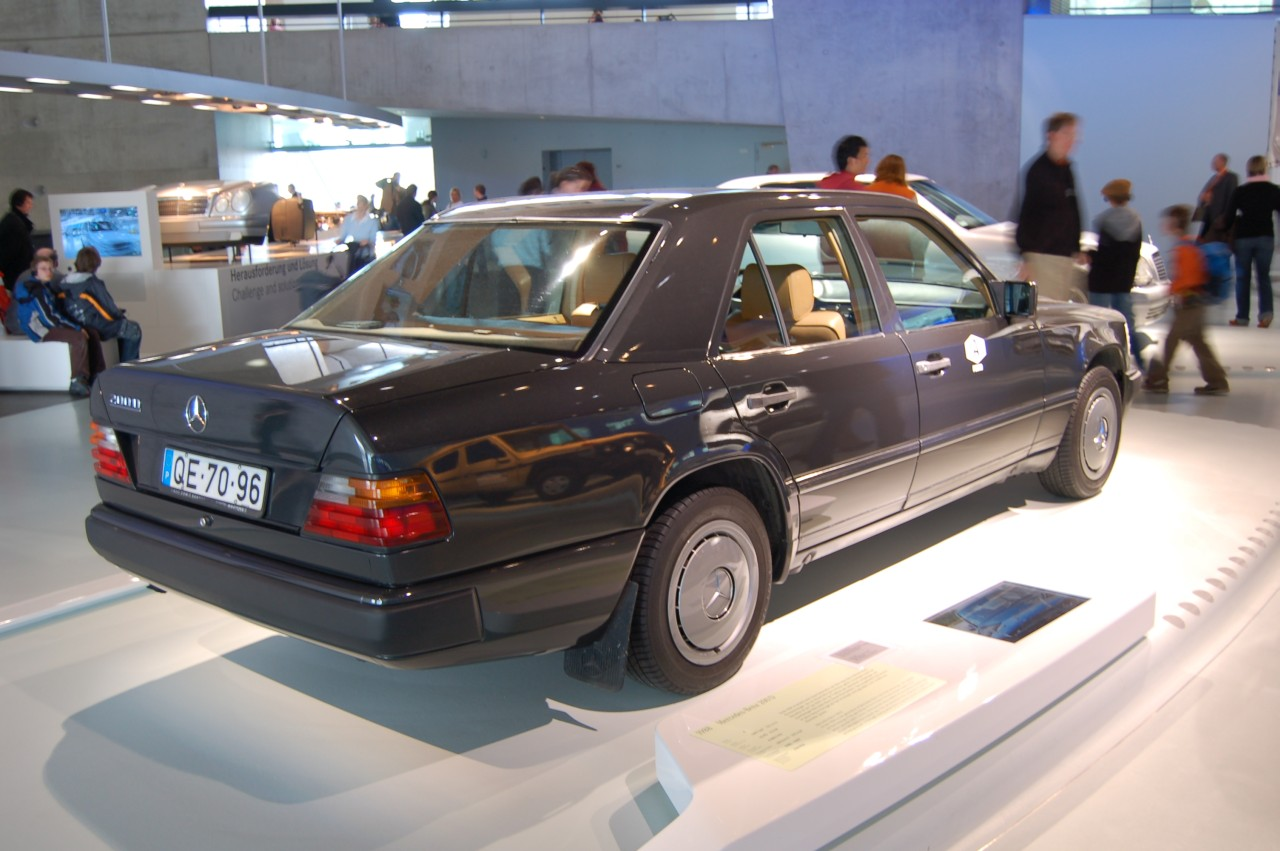
Million-mile taxi W124

The W124 gained a good reputation for reliability. In 1995 the diesel engined version topped the "upper middle class" category in a reliability survey of 4–6-year-old cars undertaken by the German Automobile Association (ADAC), with 11.8 recorded breakdowns per 1,000 vehicles for four-year-old cars and 21.6 for six-year-old ones: this compared with 14.6 breakdowns per 1,000 cars for four-year-old Audi 100s and 27.3 for six-year-old big Audis.
