= Mercedes-Benz OM612 engine =

Mercedes-Benz OM612 Engine
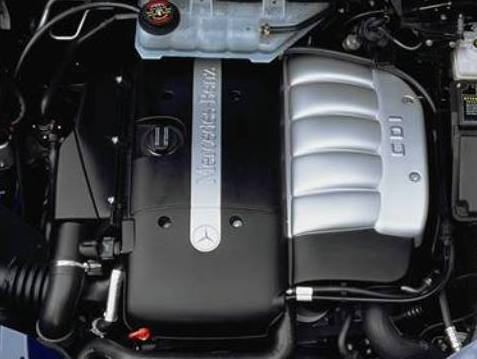

Overview
- Manufacturer: Daimler AG (Mercedes-Benz)
- Production: 1999–2013

Layout
- Configuration: Straight-5
- Displacement: 2.7 L; 163.8 cu in (2,685 cc); 3.0 L; 180.0 cu in (2,950 cc)
- Cylinder bore: 88 mm (3.46 in)
- Piston stroke: 88.3–97 mm (3.48–3.82 in)
- Valvetrain: DOHC 20 valves
- Compression ratio: 18:1

Combustion
- Turbocharger: Yes
- Fuel system: Bosch common rail direct injection
- Fuel type: Diesel
- Cooling system: Water-cooled

Output
- Power output: 115–170 kW (156–231 PS; 154–228 hp)
- Torque output: 330–540 N⋅m (243–398 lb⋅ft)

Chronology
- Predecessor: Mercedes-Benz OM605 engine
- Successor: Mercedes-Benz OM647 Engine

The Mercedes-Benz OM612 is a straight-5 diesel engine produced by Daimler AG (now Mercedes-Benz).

It was introduced in 1999 for the 2000 model year in a 170 PS (125 kW; 168 hp) version in the W210 E-Class, W211 E-Class, W163 ML-Class, W203 C-Class and W209 CLK-Class in 2000. Also used in the Austrian built Jeep WG Grand Cherokee (ENF in Jeep catalogues), equivalent to the petrol WJ. On SsangYong models it names D27DT (further DTP) engine or OM665.9xx engine and has another displacement. These models have an index of x270 XDI.

A detuned version with 156 PS (115 kW; 154 hp) was used in the W90x Sprinter from 2000 to 2006, and in some versions of the military G-Wagen.

The OM612 DE 30 LA is a 2950 cc version with 231 PS (170 kW; 228 hp), developed by Mercedes-AMG, was used in the C 30 CDI AMG versions of the W203 C-Class and CL203 C SportCoupé. This remains the only diesel-powered AMG vehicle to date, except for the second generation AMG MB100 van, powered by an AMG modified OM616 or OM617 engine.

The OM612 was a 5-cylinder version of the OM611. A six-cylinder OM613 was also produced.

== Technical specifications ==
Power	Torque	Applications
156 PS (115 kW; 154 hp) @ 3800 rpm	330 N⋅m (243 lb⋅ft) @ 1400–2400 rpm	2000 W90x Sprinter and W463 G 270 CDI
163–165 PS (120–121 kW; 161–163 hp) @ 4000–4200 rpm	342–370 N⋅m (252–273 lb⋅ft) @ 1600–2800 rpm	1999 W210 E-Class, 2000 W203 C-Class for Belgium, 2005-2014 (DJ) SsangYong Kyron, 2001-2012 Y200, Y300 SsangYong Rexton, 2004-2013 (AJ) SsangYong Rodius, 2003-2005 (WG/WJ) Jeep Grand Cherokee
170 PS (125 kW; 168 hp) @ 4200 rpm	400 N⋅m (295 lb⋅ft) @ 1600–2800 rpm	1999 W210 E-Class and 2000 W203 C-Class for others than Belgium
231 PS (170 kW; 228 hp) @ 3800 rpm	540 N⋅m (398 lb⋅ft) @ 2000 rpm	2002-2004 Mercedes-Benz C 30 CDI AMG; 2002-2004 Mercedes-Benz C 30 CDI AMG SportCoupé
