= 1996 ITC Nürburgring-2 round =

(Germany) 1996 ITC Nürburgring-2 round
Round details
- Round 8 of 13 rounds in the 1996 International Touring Car Championship
- Layout of the Nürburgring
- Location: Nürburgring, Nürburg, Germany
- Course: Permanent racing facility 4.556 km (2.831 mi)

International Touring Car Championship

Race 1
- Date: 1 September 1996
- Laps: 22

Pole position
Driver	(Italy) Alessandro Nannini	Martini Alfa Corse
- Time: 1:36.629

Podium
First	(Italy) Alessandro Nannini	Martini Alfa Corse
Second	(Germany) Bernd Schneider	D2 Mercedes-AMG
Third	(United Kingdom) Dario Franchitti	D2 Mercedes-AMG

Fastest lap
Driver	(Italy) Alessandro Nannini	Martini Alfa Corse
- Time: 1:39.085 (on lap 19)

Race 2
- Date: 1 September 1996
- Laps: 22

Podium
First	(Italy) Alessandro Nannini	Martini Alfa Corse
Second	(Germany) Bernd Schneider	D2 Mercedes-AMG
Third	(United Kingdom) Dario Franchitti	D2 Mercedes-AMG

Fastest lap
Driver	(Italy) Alessandro Nannini	Martini Alfa Corse
- Time: 1:38.067 (on lap 3)

The 1996 ITC Nürburgring-2 round was the eighth round of the 1996 International Touring Car Championship season. It took place on 1 September at the Nürburgring.

Alessandro Nannini won both races, driving an Alfa Romeo 155 V6 TI.

== Classification ==
=== Qualifying ===
Pos.	No.	Driver	Car	Team	Time	Grid
1	6	(Italy) Alessandro Nannini	Alfa Romeo 155 V6 TI	(Italy) Martini Alfa Corse	1:36.629	1
2	2	(United Kingdom) Dario Franchitti	Mercedes C-Class	(Germany) D2 Mercedes-AMG	1:36.830	2
3	1	(Germany) Bernd Schneider	Mercedes C-Class	(Germany) D2 Mercedes-AMG	1:36.930	3
4	14	(Italy) Giancarlo Fisichella	Alfa Romeo 155 V6 TI	(Italy) TV Spielfilm Alfa Corse	1:37.119	4
5	7	(Germany) Manuel Reuter	Opel Calibra V6 4x4	(Germany) Joest Racing Opel	1:37.344	5
6	5	(Italy) Nicola Larini	Alfa Romeo 155 V6 TI	(Italy) Martini Alfa Corse	1:37.759	6
7	24	(France) Yannick Dalmas	Opel Calibra V6 4x4	(Germany) Joest Racing Opel	1:37.915	7
8	43	(Finland) JJ Lehto	Opel Calibra V6 4x4	(Germany) Team Rosberg Opel	1:38.058	8
9	18	(Italy) Gabriele Tarquini	Alfa Romeo 155 V6 TI	(Italy) JAS Motorsport Alfa Romeo	1:38.284	9
10	11	(Germany) Jörg van Ommen	Mercedes C-Class	(Germany) UPS Mercedes-AMG	1:38.368	10
11	25	(Austria) Alexander Wurz	Opel Calibra V6 4x4	(Germany) Joest Racing Opel	1:38.528	11
12	17	(Germany) Klaus Ludwig	Opel Calibra V6 4x4	(Germany) Zakspeed Opel	1:38.564	12
13	10	(Germany) Michael Bartels	Alfa Romeo 155 V6 TI	(Italy) Jägermeister JAS Motorsport Alfa Romeo	1:38.628	13
14	3	(Brazil) Ricardo Zonta	Mercedes C-Class	(Germany) Warsteiner Mercedes-AMG	1:38.650	14
15	44	(Germany) Hans-Joachim Stuck	Opel Calibra V6 4x4	(Germany) Team Rosberg Opel	1:38.744	15
16	12	(Denmark) Kurt Thiim	Mercedes C-Class	(Germany) UPS Mercedes-AMG	1:38.832	16
17	9	(Italy) Stefano Modena	Alfa Romeo 155 V6 TI	(Italy) JAS Motorsport Alfa Romeo	1:39.094	17
18	8	(United Kingdom) Oliver Gavin	Opel Calibra V6 4x4	(Germany) Joest Racing Opel	1:39.131	18
19	4	(Germany) Bernd Mayländer	Mercedes C-Class	(Germany) Warsteiner Mercedes-AMG	1:39.184	19
20	15	(Germany) Christian Danner	Alfa Romeo 155 V6 TI	(Italy) TV Spielfilm Alfa Corse	1:39.309	20
21	19	(Denmark) Jason Watt	Alfa Romeo 155 V6 TI	(Italy) Bosch JAS Motorsport Alfa Romeo	1:39.396	21
22	16	(Germany) Uwe Alzen	Opel Calibra V6 4x4	(Germany) Zakspeed Opel	1:39.469	22
23	22	(Germany) Alexander Grau	Mercedes C-Class	(Germany) Persson Motorsport	1:40.047	23
24	23	(Germany) Volker Strycek	Opel Calibra V6 4x4	(Germany) Joest Racing Opel	1:40.484	24
25	21	(Germany) Ellen Lohr	Mercedes C-Class	(Germany) Persson Motorsport	1:40.818	25
26	13	(Italy) Gianni Giudici	Opel Calibra V6 4x4	(Italy) Giudici Motorsport	2:58.674	26

=== Race 1 ===
Pos.	No.	Driver	Car	Team	Laps	Time/Retired	Grid	Points
1	6	(Italy) Alessandro Nannini	Alfa Romeo 155 V6 TI	(Italy) Martini Alfa Corse	22	36:37.850	1	20
2	1	(Germany) Bernd Schneider	Mercedes C-Class	(Germany) D2 Mercedes-AMG	22	+0.357	3	15
3	2	(United Kingdom) Dario Franchitti	Mercedes C-Class	(Germany) D2 Mercedes-AMG	22	+2.013	2	12
4	7	(Germany) Manuel Reuter	Opel Calibra V6 4x4	(Germany) Joest Racing Opel	22	+2.201	5	10
5	14	(Italy) Giancarlo Fisichella	Alfa Romeo 155 V6 TI	(Italy) TV Spielfilm Alfa Corse	22	+9.739	4	8
6	5	(Italy) Nicola Larini	Alfa Romeo 155 V6 TI	(Italy) Martini Alfa Corse	22	+14.981	6	6
7	43	(Finland) JJ Lehto	Opel Calibra V6 4x4	(Germany) Team Rosberg Opel	22	+15.467	8	4
8	24	(France) Yannick Dalmas	Opel Calibra V6 4x4	(Germany) Joest Racing Opel	22	+17.608	7	3
9	11	(Germany) Jörg van Ommen	Mercedes C-Class	(Germany) UPS Mercedes-AMG	22	+26.425	10	2
10	12	(Denmark) Kurt Thiim	Mercedes C-Class	(Germany) UPS Mercedes-AMG	22	+27.321	16	1
11	4	(Germany) Bernd Mayländer	Mercedes C-Class	(Germany) Warsteiner Mercedes-AMG	22	+31.414	19	
12	16	(Germany) Uwe Alzen	Opel Calibra V6 4x4	(Germany) Zakspeed Opel	22	+31.924	22	
13	9	(Italy) Stefano Modena	Alfa Romeo 155 V6 TI	(Italy) JAS Motorsport Alfa Romeo	22	+40.675	17	
14	19	(Denmark) Jason Watt	Alfa Romeo 155 V6 TI	(Italy) Bosch JAS Motorsport Alfa Romeo	22	+48.165	21	
15	10	(Germany) Michael Bartels	Alfa Romeo 155 V6 TI	(Italy) Jägermeister JAS Motorsport Alfa Romeo	22	+50.497	13	
16	8	(United Kingdom) Oliver Gavin	Opel Calibra V6 4x4	(Germany) Joest Racing Opel	22	+51.033	18	
17	22	(Germany) Alexander Grau	Mercedes C-Class	(Germany) Persson Motorsport	22	+1:07.801	23	
18	15	(Germany) Christian Danner	Alfa Romeo 155 V6 TI	(Italy) TV Spielfilm Alfa Corse	22	+1:10.677	20	
19	23	(Germany) Volker Strycek	Opel Calibra V6 4x4	(Germany) Joest Racing Opel	22	+1:14.507	24	
20	21	(Germany) Ellen Lohr	Mercedes C-Class	(Germany) Persson Motorsport	22	+1:18.593	25	
21	13	(Italy) Gianni Giudici	Opel Calibra V6 4x4	(Italy) Giudici Motorsport	21	+1 lap	26	
22	44	(Germany) Hans-Joachim Stuck	Opel Calibra V6 4x4	(Germany) Team Rosberg Opel	20	Retired	15	
Ret	17	(Germany) Klaus Ludwig	Opel Calibra V6 4x4	(Germany) Zakspeed Opel	19	Retired	12	
Ret	3	(Brazil) Ricardo Zonta	Mercedes C-Class	(Germany) Warsteiner Mercedes-AMG	12	Retired	14	
Ret	18	(Italy) Gabriele Tarquini	Alfa Romeo 155 V6 TI	(Italy) JAS Motorsport Alfa Romeo	11	Retired	9	
Ret	25	(Austria) Alexander Wurz	Opel Calibra V6 4x4	(Germany) Joest Racing Opel	8	Retired	11	

=== Race 2 ===
Pos.	No.	Driver	Car	Team	Laps	Time/Retired	Grid	Points
1	6	(Italy) Alessandro Nannini	Alfa Romeo 155 V6 TI	(Italy) Martini Alfa Corse	22	36:22.420	1	20
2	1	(Germany) Bernd Schneider	Mercedes C-Class	(Germany) D2 Mercedes-AMG	22	+0.960	2	15
3	2	(United Kingdom) Dario Franchitti	Mercedes C-Class	(Germany) D2 Mercedes-AMG	22	+1.377	3	12
4	14	(Italy) Giancarlo Fisichella	Alfa Romeo 155 V6 TI	(Italy) TV Spielfilm Alfa Corse	22	+1.980	5	10
5	43	(Finland) JJ Lehto	Opel Calibra V6 4x4	(Germany) Team Rosberg Opel	22	+14.068	7	8
6	16	(Germany) Uwe Alzen	Opel Calibra V6 4x4	(Germany) Zakspeed Opel	22	+15.553	12	6
7	24	(France) Yannick Dalmas	Opel Calibra V6 4x4	(Germany) Joest Racing Opel	22	+18.062	8	4
8	11	(Germany) Jörg van Ommen	Mercedes C-Class	(Germany) UPS Mercedes-AMG	22	+18.501	9	3
9	4	(Germany) Bernd Mayländer	Mercedes C-Class	(Germany) Warsteiner Mercedes-AMG	22	+22.842	11	2
10	9	(Italy) Stefano Modena	Alfa Romeo 155 V6 TI	(Italy) JAS Motorsport Alfa Romeo	22	+23.475	13	1
11	17	(Germany) Klaus Ludwig	Opel Calibra V6 4x4	(Germany) Zakspeed Opel	22	+23.714	23	
12	44	(Germany) Hans-Joachim Stuck	Opel Calibra V6 4x4	(Germany) Team Rosberg Opel	22	+25.369	22	
13	3	(Brazil) Ricardo Zonta	Mercedes C-Class	(Germany) Warsteiner Mercedes-AMG	22	+35.753	24	
14	10	(Germany) Michael Bartels	Alfa Romeo 155 V6 TI	(Italy) Jägermeister JAS Motorsport Alfa Romeo	22	+35.983	15	
15	5	(Italy) Nicola Larini	Alfa Romeo 155 V6 TI	(Italy) Martini Alfa Corse	22	+45.134^{1}	6	
16	7	(Germany) Manuel Reuter	Opel Calibra V6 4x4	(Germany) Joest Racing Opel	22	+54.412	4	
17	18	(Italy) Gabriele Tarquini	Alfa Romeo 155 V6 TI	(Italy) JAS Motorsport Alfa Romeo	22	+55.161	25	
18	22	(Germany) Alexander Grau	Mercedes C-Class	(Germany) Persson Motorsport	22	+58.121	17	
19	23	(Germany) Volker Strycek	Opel Calibra V6 4x4	(Germany) Joest Racing Opel	22	+58.545	19	
20	15	(Germany) Christian Danner	Alfa Romeo 155 V6 TI	(Italy) TV Spielfilm Alfa Corse	22	+1:07.677	18	
21	21	(Germany) Ellen Lohr	Mercedes C-Class	(Germany) Persson Motorsport	22	+1:17.328	20	
22	13	(Italy) Gianni Giudici	Opel Calibra V6 4x4	(Italy) Giudici Motorsport	21	+1 lap	21	
Ret	12	(Denmark) Kurt Thiim	Mercedes C-Class	(Germany) UPS Mercedes-AMG	19	Retired	10	
Ret	19	(Denmark) Jason Watt	Alfa Romeo 155 V6 TI	(Italy) Bosch JAS Motorsport Alfa Romeo	10	Retired	14	
Ret	8	(United Kingdom) Oliver Gavin	Opel Calibra V6 4x4	(Germany) Joest Racing Opel	9	Retired	16	
DNS	25	(Austria) Alexander Wurz	Opel Calibra V6 4x4	(Germany) Joest Racing Opel		Did not start	26	

Notes:

- ^1 – Nicola Larini was given a 30-second penalty for causing a collision with Manuel Reuter.

== Standings after the event ==
Drivers' Championship standings

	Pos	Driver	Points
	1	(Germany) Manuel Reuter	159
	2	(Germany) Bernd Schneider	127
3	3	(United Kingdom) Dario Franchitti	105
	4	(Finland) JJ Lehto	104
3	5	(Italy) Alessandro Nannini	97

Manufacturers' Championship standings

	Pos	Driver	Points
	1	(Germany) Opel	242
1	2	(Italy) Alfa Romeo	186
1	3	(Germany) Mercedes	179

- Note: Only the top five positions are included for both sets of drivers' standings.
