= Mercedes-Benz OM604 engine =

Overview
- Manufacturer: Mercedes-Benz
- Production: 1993–1998

Layout
- Configuration: Naturally aspirated Straight-4
- Displacement: 2.0 L (1,997 cc); 2.2 L (2,155 cc)
- Cylinder bore: 89 mm (3.50 in); 87 mm (3.43 in)
- Piston stroke: 86.6 mm (3.41 in); 84 mm (3.31 in)
- Cylinder block material: Cast iron
- Cylinder head material: Aluminum
- Valvetrain: DOHC / 4 valves x cyl.
- Compression ratio: 22.0:1

Combustion
- Fuel system: Indirect injection
- Management: Lucas EPIC
- Fuel type: Diesel
- Oil system: Wet sump
- Cooling system: Water cooled

Output
- Power output: 55–70 kW (75–95 PS; 74–94 hp)
- Torque output: 135–150 N⋅m (100–111 lb⋅ft)

Chronology
- Predecessor: Mercedes-Benz OM601 engine
- Successor: Mercedes-Benz OM611 engine

The Mercedes-Benz OM604 is a 2.0 litres (1,997 cc) and 2.2 litres (2,155 cc) inline-four cylinder (R4/I4) double overhead camshaft (DOHC) diesel engine with indirect injection manufactured by Mercedes-Benz between 1993 and 1998. It replaced the single overhead camshaft (SOHC) OM601 engine. Unlike other Mercedes-Benz diesels at the time that used a Bosch inline injection pump, the OM604 used the Lucas electronically controlled rotary distributor injection pump (EVE), which is less reliable. The seals of the Lucas injection pumps become brittle over time and leak, however a seal kit is available.

It is related to the straight-5 2.5 litre OM605 and the straight-6 3.0 litre OM606 engines.

== Design ==
As per the OM601 the engine has a cast iron block and aluminum cylinder head. The block has 5 main caps, which are held by two bolts per cap. The head is a DOHC design with 4 valves per cylinder and split intake ports. Like the OM60, it has hydraulic bucket type lifters, thus requiring no periodical valve adjustment.

It has a double row timing chain that drives the injection pump and the camshafts. The sprocket is on the exhaust camshaft and both cams are connected by a gear drive, while the oil pump is driven by a separate single row chain.

Due to its nature of being naturally aspirated, the OM604 typically needs turbo conversion in order to justify serious tuning.

== Specifications ==
ID	Displacement	Bore x stroke	Max. power (DIN-rated)	Max. torque	Years	Applications
OM 604.910 EVE	2.2 L (2,155 cc)	89 mm × 86.6 mm (3.50 in × 3.41 in)	70 kW (95 PS; 94 hp) @ 5000 rpm	150 N⋅m (111 lb⋅ft) @ 3100 rpm	1993–1998	W202 C 220 D
OM 604.910 EVE	2.2 L (2,155 cc)	89 mm × 86.6 mm (3.50 in × 3.41 in)	55 kW (75 PS; 74 hp) @ 5000 rpm	150 N⋅m (111 lb⋅ft) @ 3100 rpm	1996–1998	W202 C 220 D taxis
OM 604.912 EVE	2.2 L (2,155 cc)	89 mm × 86.6 mm (3.50 in × 3.41 in)	70 kW (95 PS; 94 hp) @ 5000 rpm	150 N⋅m (111 lb⋅ft) @ 3100 rpm	1995–1998	W210 E 220 D
OM 604.912 EVE	2.2 L (2,155 cc)	89 mm × 86.6 mm (3.50 in × 3.41 in)	55 kW (75 PS; 74 hp) @ 5000 rpm	150 N⋅m (111 lb⋅ft) @ 3100 rpm	1996–1998	W210 E 220 D taxis
OM 604.915 EVE	2.0 L (1,997 cc)	87 mm × 84 mm (3.43 in × 3.31 in)	65 kW (88 PS; 87 hp) @ 5000 rpm	135 N⋅m (100 lb⋅ft) @ 2000 rpm	1996–1998	W202 C 200 D
OM 604.917 EVE	2.0 L (1,997 cc)	87 mm × 84 mm (3.43 in × 3.31 in)	65 kW (88 PS; 87 hp) @ 5000 rpm	135 N⋅m (100 lb⋅ft) @ 2000 rpm	1996–1998	W210 E 200 D

== SsangYong D20DT engine / OM664.95x ==
The Korean company Ssangyong has developed D20DT (created under license from Mercedes) series diesel engines based on the OM604 engine. Compared to the original Mercedes diesel, the Korean uses the Common Rail fuel injection system, turbocharging (unlike N/A OM604) and has slightly increased the engine capacity to 1,998 cc, compared to 1,997 cc in the OM604. In the Mercedes range, the engine has an index of OM664.950 / 951 and was installed on the Actyon, Actyon Sports and Kyron models in the mid-2000s.

ID	Displacement	Bore x stroke	Max. power (DIN-rated)	Max. torque	Years	Applications
D20DT / OM664.950	2.0 L (1,998 cc)	86.2 mm × 85.6 mm (3.39 in × 3.37 in)	104 kW (141 PS; 139 hp) @ 4000 rpm	310 N⋅m (229 lb⋅ft) @ 2700 (2750) rpm	2005–2012	(DJ) SsangYong Kyron M200 XDI
D20DT / OM664.951	2.0 L (1,998 cc)	86.2 mm × 85.6 mm (3.39 in × 3.37 in)	104 kW (141 PS; 139 hp) @ 4000 rpm	310 N⋅m (229 lb⋅ft) @ 2700 (2750) rpm	2005–2012	(CJ) SsangYong Actyon A200 XDI / Actyon Sports A200S XDI

== See also ==
- List of Mercedes-Benz engines
