= Mercedes-Benz OM646 engine =

Mercedes-Benz OM646
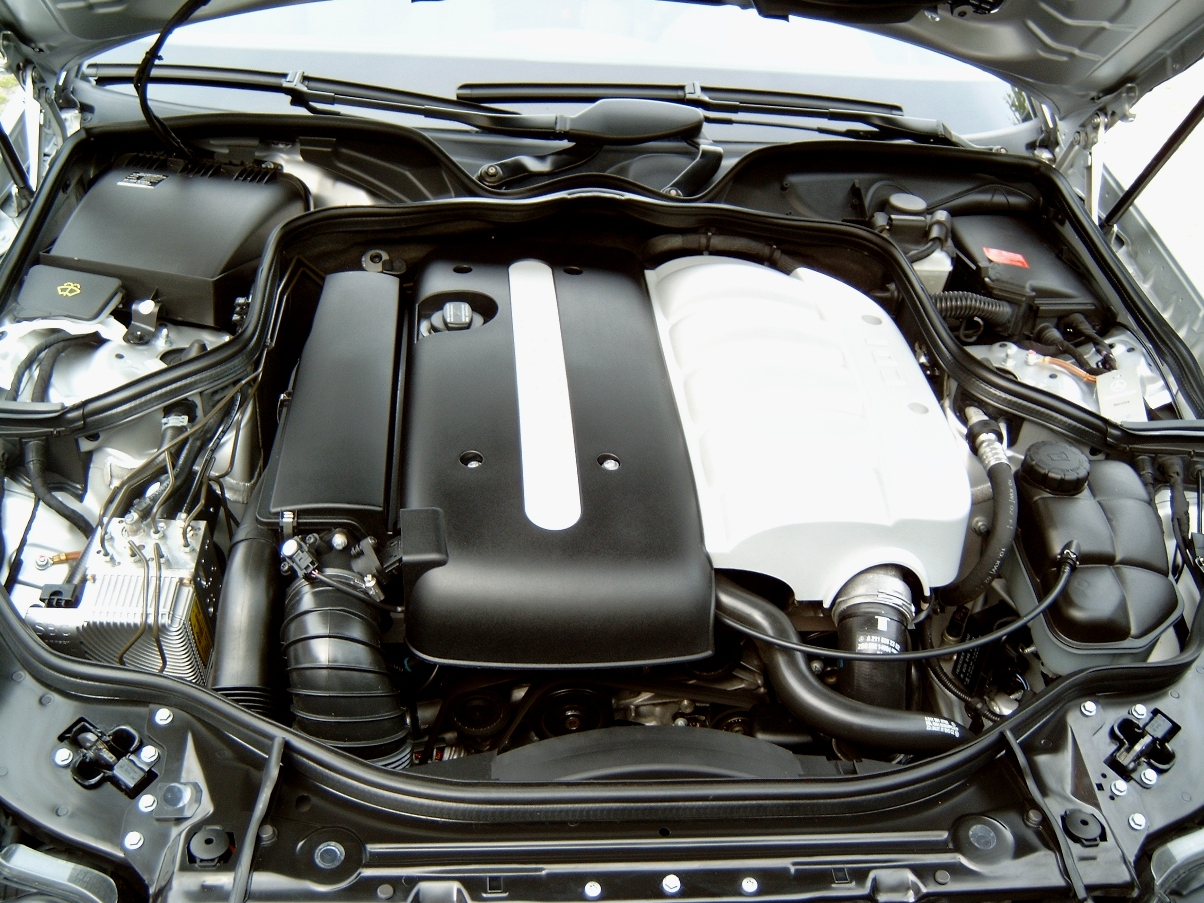

Overview
- Manufacturer: Mercedes-Benz
- Production: 2002–2010

Layout
- Configuration: Inline-four engine
- Displacement: 2.1 L (2148 cc)
- Cylinder bore: 88 mm (3.46 in)
- Piston stroke: 88.3 mm (3.48 in)
- Cylinder block material: Cast iron
- Cylinder head material: Aluminium alloy
- Valvetrain: DOHC
- Compression ratio: 17.5:1 (DE22 LA EVO), 18.0:1

Combustion
- Turbocharger: Single
- Fuel system: Common rail
- Fuel type: Diesel
- Cooling system: Water cooled

Output
- Power output: 65–125 kW (88–170 PS; 87–168 hp)
- Torque output: 220–400 N⋅m (162–295 lb⋅ft)

Emissions
- Emissions target standard: Euro 4
- Emissions control systems: EGR, DPF

Chronology
- Predecessor: Mercedes-Benz OM611 engine
- Successor: Mercedes-Benz OM651 engine

The OM646 is a turbocharged inline-four engine produced between 2002 and 2010 by Mercedes-Benz.

== Design ==
The OM646 engine is sold under the 200 CDI and 220 CDI designation and features an electric fuel pump, exhaust gas recirculation, particulate filters, and Euro 4 emission standard compliance (from 2003). In 2006, the engine was updated under the EVO name and replaced the OM647 engine. It features a reduced compression ratio of 17.5:1, a new turbocharger, and ceramic glow plugs for improved engine starts.

== Models ==
Engine	Power	Torque	Years
OM646; DE22 LA R	65 kW (88 PS; 87 hp) @ 3,800 rpm	220 N⋅m (162 lb⋅ft) @ 1,400–2,500 rpm	2003–2010
OM646; DE22 LA R	70 kW (95 PS; 94 hp) @ 3,800 rpm	250 N⋅m (184 lb⋅ft) @ 1,400–2,600 rpm	2006–2010
OM646; DE22 LA R	80 kW (109 PS; 107 hp) @ 3,800 rpm	270 N⋅m (199 lb⋅ft) @ 1,600–2,600 rpm	2003–2010
OM646; DE22 LA R	85 kW (116 PS; 114 hp) @ 3,800 rpm	290 N⋅m (214 lb⋅ft) @ 1,600–2,600 rpm	2006–2010
OM646 DE22 LA R	90 kW (122 PS; 121 hp) @ 4,200 rpm	270 N⋅m (199 lb⋅ft) @ 1,400–2,800 rpm	2003–2010
OM646; DE22 LA	65 kW (88 PS; 87 hp) @ 3,800 rpm	220 N⋅m (162 lb⋅ft) @ 1,600–2,600 rpm	2006–2009
OM646; DE22 LA	80 kW (109 PS; 107 hp) @ 3,800 rpm	280 N⋅m (207 lb⋅ft) @ 1,600–2,400 rpm	2006–2009
OM646; DE22 LA	95 kW (129 PS; 127 hp) @ 3,800 rpm	305 N⋅m (225 lb⋅ft) @ 1,200–2,400 rpm	2006–2009
OM646; DE22 LA	105 kW (143 PS; 141 hp) @ 4,200 rpm	340 N⋅m (251 lb⋅ft) @ 2,000 rpm	2003–2004
OM646 DE22 LA	110 kW (150 PS; 148 hp) @ 3,800–4,200 rpm	330 N⋅m (243 lb⋅ft) @ 1,200–2,400 rpm	2003–2010
OM646; DE22 LA EVO R	100 kW (136 PS; 134 hp) @ 3,800 rpm	270 N⋅m (199 lb⋅ft) @ 1,600–3,000 rpm	2007–2009
OM646; DE22 LA EVO R	100 kW (136 PS; 134 hp) @ 3,800 rpm	340 N⋅m (251 lb⋅ft) @ 2,000 rpm	2006–2009
OM646; DE22 LA EVO	125 kW (170 PS; 168 hp) @ 3,800 rpm	400 N⋅m (295 lb⋅ft) @ 2,000 rpm	2006–2009

=== OM646 DE22 LA R ===
- 2003–2006 W211 E200 CDI
- 2003–2007 W203 C200 CDI
- 2003–2010 W639 Vito 109 CDI, 111 CDI, 2.0 CDI
- 2008–2010 CL203 CLC200 CDI
- 2003-2009 Chrysler PT Cruiser

=== OM646 DE22 LA ===
- 2002–2006 W211 E220 CDI
- 2004–2007 W203 C220 CDI
- 2003–2010 W639 Vito 115 CDI, 2.2 CDI
- 2005–2010 C209 CLK220 CDI
- 2006–2009 W906 Sprinter 209-516 CDI
- 2008–2010 CL203 CLC220 CDI
- 2010–2013 Vito (Chinese market; known as OM646 980)
- 2003–2009 Chrysler PT Cruiser

=== OM646 DE 22 LA EVO R ===
- 2006–2009 W211 E200 CDI
- 2007–2009 W204 C200 CDI

=== OM646 DE 22 LA EVO ===
- 2006–2009 W211 E220 CDI
- 2007–2009 W204 C220 CDI
