= Mercedes-Benz M104 engine =

Straight-6 cylinder engine from 1989

Mercedes-Benz M104
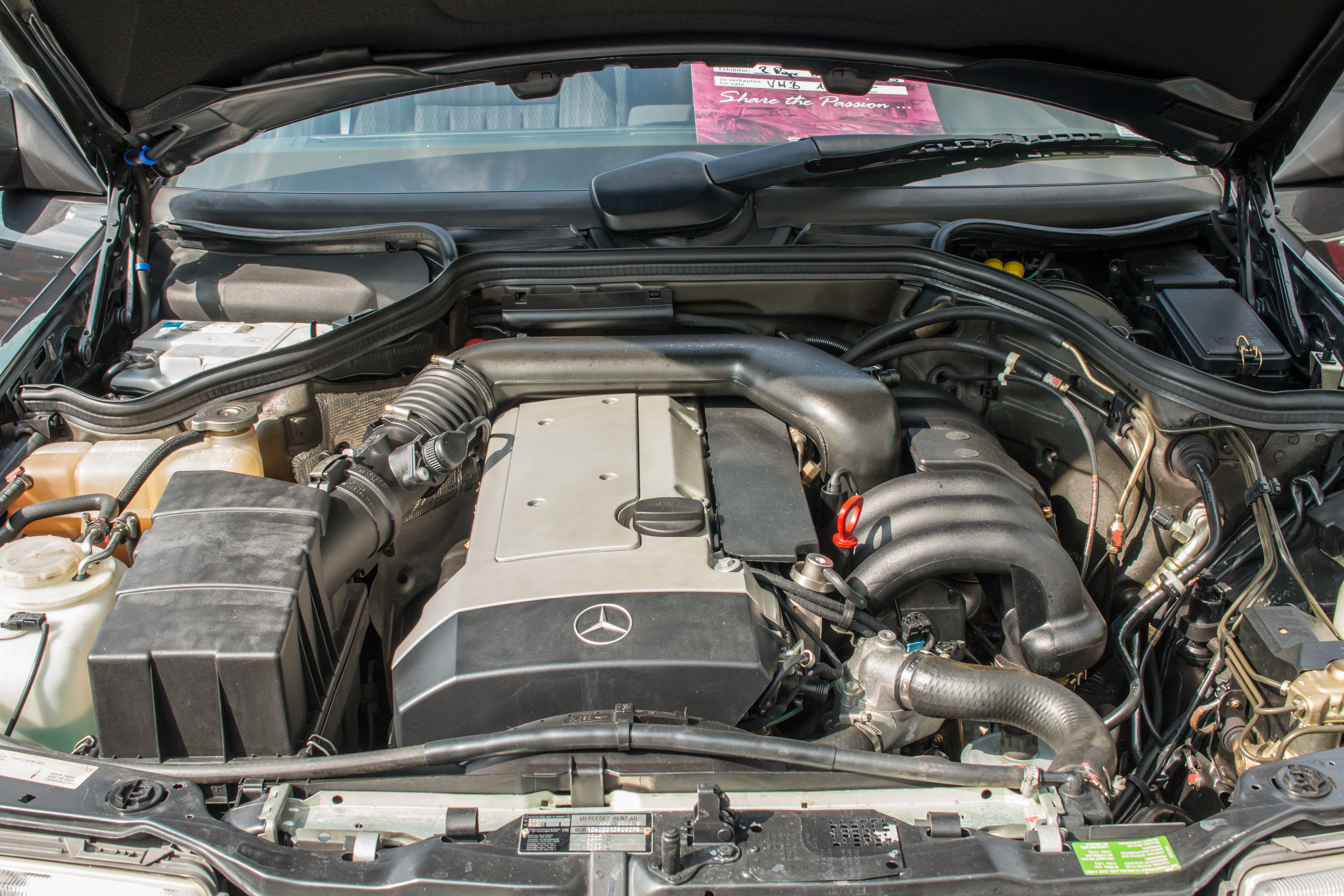

Overview
- Manufacturer: Mercedes-Benz AG
- Production: 1989–1998

Layout
- Configuration: Straight-6 (except M 104 E 28 (M104.900, refer VW VR6)
- Displacement: M 104 E 28: 2.8 L; 170.8 cu in (2,799 cc); M 104 E 30: 3.0 L; 180.8 cu in (2,962 cc); M 104 E 32: 3.2 L; 195.2 cu in (3,199 cc)
- Cylinder block material: Cast iron
- Cylinder head material: Aluminium
- Valvetrain: DOHC 4 valves per cylinder with VVT
- Compression ratio: 9.2:1; 10:1; 10.5:1 (AMG models)

Combustion
- Fuel system: Bosch KE-Jetronic (KE-CIS) Bosch LH-Jetronic (LH-SFI) Bosch Motronic (HFM-SFI)
- Management: Electronic
- Fuel type: Gasoline
- Oil system: Wet sump
- Cooling system: Water cooled

Output
- Power output: 193–280 PS (142–206 kW; 190–276 hp) SAE
- Torque output: 265–385 N⋅m (195–284 lb⋅ft) at 4600/min M104.98X

Chronology
- Predecessor: M 103
- Successor: M 112

The Mercedes-Benz M 104 is an automobile straight-six engine produced from 1989 through 1998. It has a double overhead cam design with 4 valves per cylinder, and used a crossflow cylinder head. It replaced the M 103 and was replaced by the M 112 V6 starting in 1997. The bore pitch on all M 104 engines is 97 mm, the same as M 103 engines.

== Volkswagen 2.8 L VR6 M 104 E 28 (M104.900 only) ==
As Mercedes needed a compact 6-cylinder for their Vito, they agreed with Volkswagen to use their VR6 engine, which they then designated M104.900. An agreement was reached and the engines were sold semi-completed to Mercedes-Benz. This version is unrelated to other engines designated M 104. Only the engine cover and air cleaner housing is by Mercedes-Benz.

== 1989: 3.0 L M 104 E 30 ==
=== Expansion of the product line ===
This 3.0 L (2,962 cc) 24V was introduced as a sports car resp. top model completing the line-up of M 103 12V engines. The M 104 featured dual overhead camshafts and four valves per cylinder.

The 2,962 cc (180.8 cu in) M 104 featured KE-Jetronic fuel injection, cylinder specific ignition-timing, variable valve timing and under-piston cooling jets.

=== Specifications ===
- Engine power at 6400/min or 6300/min (300 SL-24): 217–228 hp (162–170 kW; 220–231 PS) (without catalytic converter). Version R 129 300 SL-24 has 170 kW (231 PS; 228 hp) 272 N⋅m (201 lb⋅ft) version of 3 L M 104 engine.
- Torque at 4600/min: 265 or 272 N⋅m (195 or 201 lb⋅ft) (with or without catalytic converter)
- Bore and stroke: 88.5 mm × 80.25 mm (3.484 in × 3.159 in)
- Compression ratio: 10:1

=== Applications ===
- 1989–1992 W 124 300 E-24
- 1989–1992 S 124 300 TE-24
- 1989–1992 C 124 300 CE-24
- 1992–1993 A 124 300 CE-24 convertible
- 1989–1993 R 129 300 SL-24
- 1989–1993 Isdera Spyder 036i 3.0-24V

== 1992: 2.8 L M 104 E 28 (non VR6) ==
=== Replacement of the single-cam engines ===
The 2.8 L; 170.8 cu in (2,799 cc) M 104 E 28 replaced the old single-cam M 103 engines. The W 124 280 E (1992–1993) get power of 145 kW (197 PS; 194 hp).

=== Specifications ===
- Engine power at 5500/min: 142 kW (193 PS; 190 hp) or 145–148 kW (197–201 PS; 194–198 hp) on SsangYong models
- Torque at 3750/min: 270 N⋅m (199 lb⋅ft) or 271–277 N⋅m (200–204 lb⋅ft) on SsangYong models
- Bore and stroke: 89.9 mm × 73.5 mm (3.539 in × 2.894 in)
- Lubrication system: pressure circulation
- Oil capacity: 7.0 L (1.8 US gal; 1.5 imp gal)
- Coolant capacity: 9.0 L (2.4 US gal; 2.0 imp gal)
- Camshaft drive: duplex roller chain
- Starter motor: 1.7 kW electrical motor
- Ignition system: ignition mapping control

=== Applications ===
- 1992–1995 W 124 280 E · E 280
- 1992–1998 W 140 300 SE 2.8 · S 280
- 1993–1997 W 202 C 280
- 1993–1998 R 129 SL 280
- 1995–1997 W 210 E 280
- 1997–2004 SsangYong Chairman H CM500S
- 2003–2006 Y200 SsangYong Rexton I RX 280

== 1992: 3.2 L M 104 E 32 ==
=== Replacement of the 3.0 L engine to reduce engine speed ===
The 3.2 L (3,199 cc) M 104 E 32 replaced the 3.0 L double-cam M 104 E 30.

For the 3,199 cc (195.2 cu in), the compression ratio is the same 10.0:1 on all W 210, R 129, and W 140 but it did differ from 9.2:1 to 10.0:1 on W 124 (M104.992).W 140 pre-facelift model 300 SE/SEL, W 140 facelift model S 320/L and R 129 SL 320 used more powerful version of 3.2 L M 104 engine which produced 170 kW (231 PS; 228 hp).

=== Specifications ===
- Engine power at 5500/min: 162 or 170 kW (220 or 231 PS; 217 or 228 hp)
- Torque at 3750/min: 310 or 315 N⋅m (229 or 232 lb⋅ft)
- Bore and stroke: 89.9 mm × 84 mm (3.539 in × 3.307 in)
- Compression ratio: 9.2:1 to 10.0:1
- Intake valves: 35 mm (1.38 in)
- Exhaust valves 31 mm (1.22 in)
- Starter motor: 1.7 kW electrical motor
- Ignition system: electronic ignition system

=== Applications ===
- Mercedes-Benz
  - 1991–1998 W 140 300 SE & V 140 300 SEL · S 320 & S 320 L
  - 1992–1995 W 124 320 E · E 320
  - 1992–1996 S 124 320 TE · E 320 T
  - 1992–1996 C 124 320 CE · E 320
  - 1992–1997 A 124 320 CE · E 320 convertible
  - 1993–1998 R 129 SL 320
  - 1994–1997 W 463 G 320
  - 1995–1997 W 210 E 320
- Roewe
  - 2011–2017 W5
  - 2008–2009 R95
- SsangYong
  - 1997–2017 Chairman
  - 1996–2006 Korando
  - 2007–2014 Kyron
  - 1993–1999 Musso
  - 2001–2006 Rexton Y200
  - 2004–2013 Rodius
- Heuliez
  - 1996 Intruder
- Status & Class
  - 1999 OPAC Contender XG

== AMG 3.4 (3.3 L) ==
=== Overview ===
There were 3.3 L conversions done to the 3.0 L M104.980 by AMG, during the early cooperation with Daimler Benz.

AMG developed a 3.3 L M 104 that was used principally in the 300 E AMG 3.4, AMG 3.4 CE and 300 TE 3.4 AMG (W 124) vehicles, produced between 1990 and 1992. A few of these engines were originally installed in the SL 3.4 AMG.

=== Specifications ===
- Engine power: 200 kW (272 PS; 268 hp) at 6500/min
- Torque: 330 N⋅m (243 lb⋅ft) at 4500/min
- Bore and stroke: 91.5 mm × 84 mm (3.602 in × 3.307 in)
- Lubrication system: pressure circulation
- Oil capacity: 7.5 L (2.0 US gal; 1.6 imp gal)
- Coolant capacity: 9.0 L (2.4 US gal; 2.0 imp gal)
- Starter motor: 1.7 kW electrical motor
- Ignition system: Bosch KE-Jetronic (CIS-E) injection

== AMG 3.6 L M 104 E 36 AMG ==
=== Overview ===
There were 3.6 L conversions done to both the M 103 and M 104 by Brabus, among others.

AMG developed a 3.6 L; 220.1 cu in (3,606 cc) M 104 that was used in the C 36 AMG (W 202) from M104.941, the E 36 AMG (W 124) from M104.992, the E 36 AMG (W 210), and the G 36 AMG (W 463) vehicles.

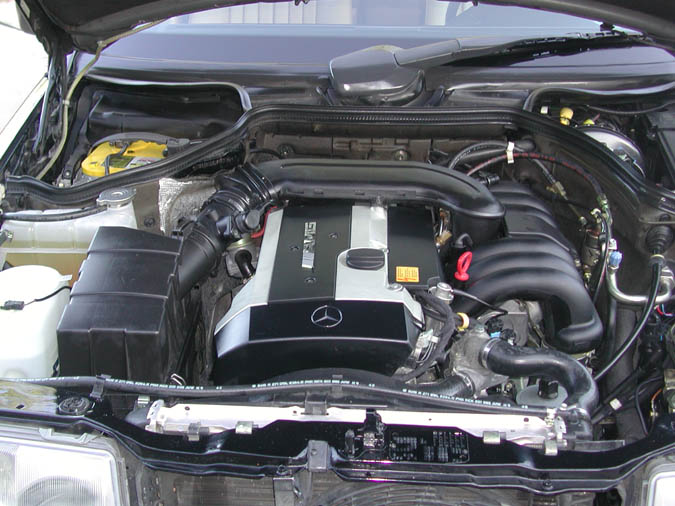
AMG 3.6 L M104 in a W124 E36T AMG

=== Performance ===
The AMG 3.6 M 104 was rated at 276 hp (206 kW; 280 PS) at 5,750/min and 284 lb⋅ft (385 N⋅m) of torque at 4,000/min using the HFM engine management system. Bore and stroke is 91 mm × 92.4 mm (3.583 in × 3.638 in) with a compression ratio of 10.5:1. AMG later conceded that since the engine was hand modified, power outputs could vary slightly from 276–287 hp (206–214 kW; 280–291 PS).

=== Modification ===
The boost in displacement was obtained by boring the 2.8 L M 104 block by 2.1 mm (0.083 in) and using a highly modified version of the crankshaft from the 3.5 L OM 603 to increase throw by 18.9 mm (0.744 in); this necessitated the use of new forged pistons with shorter skirts. A larger intake crossover pipe, free-flowing exhaust, a unique intake camshaft, minor changes to the cylinder head, and modifications to the HFM fuel computer also contribute to the increase in power.

=== Ssangyong ===
Ssangyong (South Korean brand) made a 3.6 L variant of the M 104 inline-six engine based on the 2.8 L model, producing 248 or 276 hp (185 or 206 kW; 251 or 280 PS) on earlier versions, for its Chairman model, a full-size luxury sedan. The Chinese Roewe R95L, based on the SsangYong Chairman, also uses a 3.6 L version of the M 104 engine.

=== Isdera ===
Last versions of the German sports car Isdera Spyder 036i after 1990 also use a 3.6 L AMG variant of the M 104, producing 268 or 282 hp (200 or 210 kW; 272 or 286 PS).

== Turbo conversions ==
Turbocharger kits were offered for both the M 103 and M 104 engines by Turbo Technics, Mosselman, Lotec, MAD Modify, Turbobandit and other tuners. These conversions typically raised engine output to between 300 and 800 PS (221 and 588 kW; 296 and 789 hp), depending on Boost Target.

During the 1990s UK customers were able to buy new vehicles equipped with a Turbo Technics conversion directly from Mercedes dealer Hughes of Beaconsfield (limited run of 75 conversions). Today turbocharger kits for M 103-M 104 engines are available from later tuners in Europe and Asia.
