= Mercedes-Benz OM606 engine =

Diesel engine

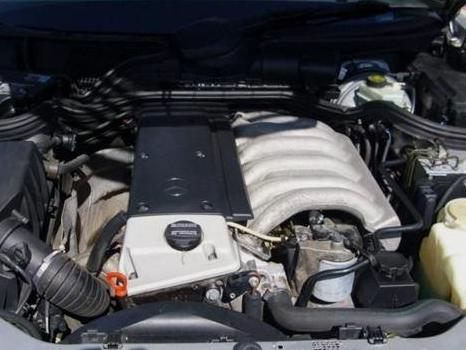

Overview
- Manufacturer: Mercedes-Benz
- Production: 1993–2001

Layout
- Configuration: Straight-6
- Displacement: 3.0 L (2,996 cc)
- Cylinder bore: 87 mm (3.43 in)
- Piston stroke: 84 mm (3.31 in)
- Cylinder block material: Cast iron
- Cylinder head material: Aluminum
- Valvetrain: DOHC 4 valves x cyl.
- Compression ratio: 22.0:1 (Turbo); 25.0:1 (N/A)

Combustion
- Turbocharger: No (.91x), Yes, intercooled (.96x)
- Fuel system: Indirect injection
- Management: Bosch
- Fuel type: Diesel
- Oil system: Wet sump
- Cooling system: Water cooled

Output
- Power output: 100–130 kW (136–177 PS; 134–174 hp)
- Torque output: 210–330 N⋅m (155–243 lb⋅ft)

Dimensions
- Dry weight: 210 kg (463 lb)

Chronology
- Predecessor: Mercedes-Benz OM603 engine
- Successor: Mercedes-Benz OM613 engine

The Mercedes-Benz OM606 is a 3.0 litres (2,996 cc) inline-six cylinder (R6/I6) double overhead camshaft (DOHC) diesel engine with indirect injection manufactured by Mercedes-Benz between 1993 and 2001. It replaced the single overhead camshaft (SOHC) OM603 engine.

It uses a Bosch electronically controlled inline injection pump (ERE) except in the W124 where it uses a Bosch mechanically governed inline injection pump (Bosch M pump with RSF governor).

It is related to the straight-4 2.0 and 2.2 litre OM604 and the straight-5 2.5 litre OM605 engine families of the same era.

== Design ==
As with the OM603 the engine has a cast iron block and aluminum cylinder head, the block has 7 main caps, they are held by two bolts per cap. The head is a DOHC design with 4 valves per cylinder and split intake ports. Also like the OM603, it has hydraulic bucket type lifters, thus requiring no periodical valve adjustment. A big difference when compared to its turbo predecessors is the intercooler.

It has a double row timing chain that drives the injection pump and the camshafts, the sprocket is on the exhaust camshaft and both cams are connected by a gear drive, while the oil pump is driven by a separate single row chain. Only the .962 engine installed on the W210 E300 TURBODIESEL had a MAF sensor.

The main differences between the naturally aspirated and the turbocharged versions are the cylinder head, injection pump, valves, camshafts, rods, intake and exhaust manifolds and some minor differences like oil feed and return holes for the turbo and different crankcase ventilation system, valve cover and plastic engine cover.

== Specifications ==
ID	DIN-rated max. motive power at rpm	Max. torque at rpm	Aspiration	Years	Applications
OM 606.910	100 kW (136 PS; 134 hp) @ 4600-5005 rpm	210 N⋅m (155 lb⋅ft) @ 2200-4600 rpm	Natural	1993–1996	W124 E 300 D
OM 606.912 ERE	100 kW (136 PS; 134 hp) @ 4600-5005 rpm	210 N⋅m (155 lb⋅ft) @ 2200-4600 rpm	Natural	1995–1997	W210 E 300 D
OM 606.961 ERE	130 kW (177 PS; 174 hp) @ 3800-4400 rpm	330 N⋅m (243 lb⋅ft) @ 1600-3600 rpm	Turbocharged intercooled	1996–1999	W140 S 300 Turbodiesel
OM 606.962 ERE	130 kW (177 PS; 174 hp) @ 3800-4400 rpm	330 N⋅m (243 lb⋅ft) @ 1600-3600 rpm	Turbocharged intercooled	1996–1999	W210 E 300 Turbodiesel
OM 606.964 ERE	130 kW (177 PS; 174 hp) @ 3800-4400 rpm	330 N⋅m (243 lb⋅ft) @ 1600-3600 rpm	Turbocharged intercooled	1996–2001	W463 G 300 Turbodiesel

== See also ==
- List of Mercedes-Benz engines
