= Mercedes-Benz OM647 engine =

Mercedes-Benz OM647

Overview
- Manufacturer: Mercedes-Benz
- Production: 2002–2006

Layout
- Configuration: Straight-5
- Displacement: 2.7 L (2,687 cc)
- Cylinder bore: 88 mm (3.46 in)
- Piston stroke: 88.3 mm (3.48 in)
- Cylinder block material: Cast-iron
- Cylinder head material: Aluminum
- Valvetrain: DOHC, 4 valves per cylinder
- Compression ratio: 18:1

Combustion
- Turbocharger: With intercooler
- Fuel system: Common rail direct injection
- Fuel type: Diesel
- Cooling system: Water-cooled

Output
- Power output: 177 hp (132 kW) @ 4200 rpm
- Torque output: 400 N⋅m (300 lb⋅ft) @ 1800 rpm

Chronology
- Predecessor: Mercedes-Benz OM612 engine

The Mercedes-Benz OM647 is a straight-5 diesel engine produced by Mercedes-Benz.

The engine utilizes a cast-iron cylinder block and an aluminum cylinder head. It is turbocharged and intercooled, and has four valves per cylinder and dual overhead camshafts.

A distinguishable aspect of the OM647 from its OM612 predecessor is its intake manifold, and the lack of a diesel fuel feed pump.

== See also ==
- List of Mercedes-Benz engines
