= Mercedes-Benz OM605 engine =

Mercedes-Benz OM605
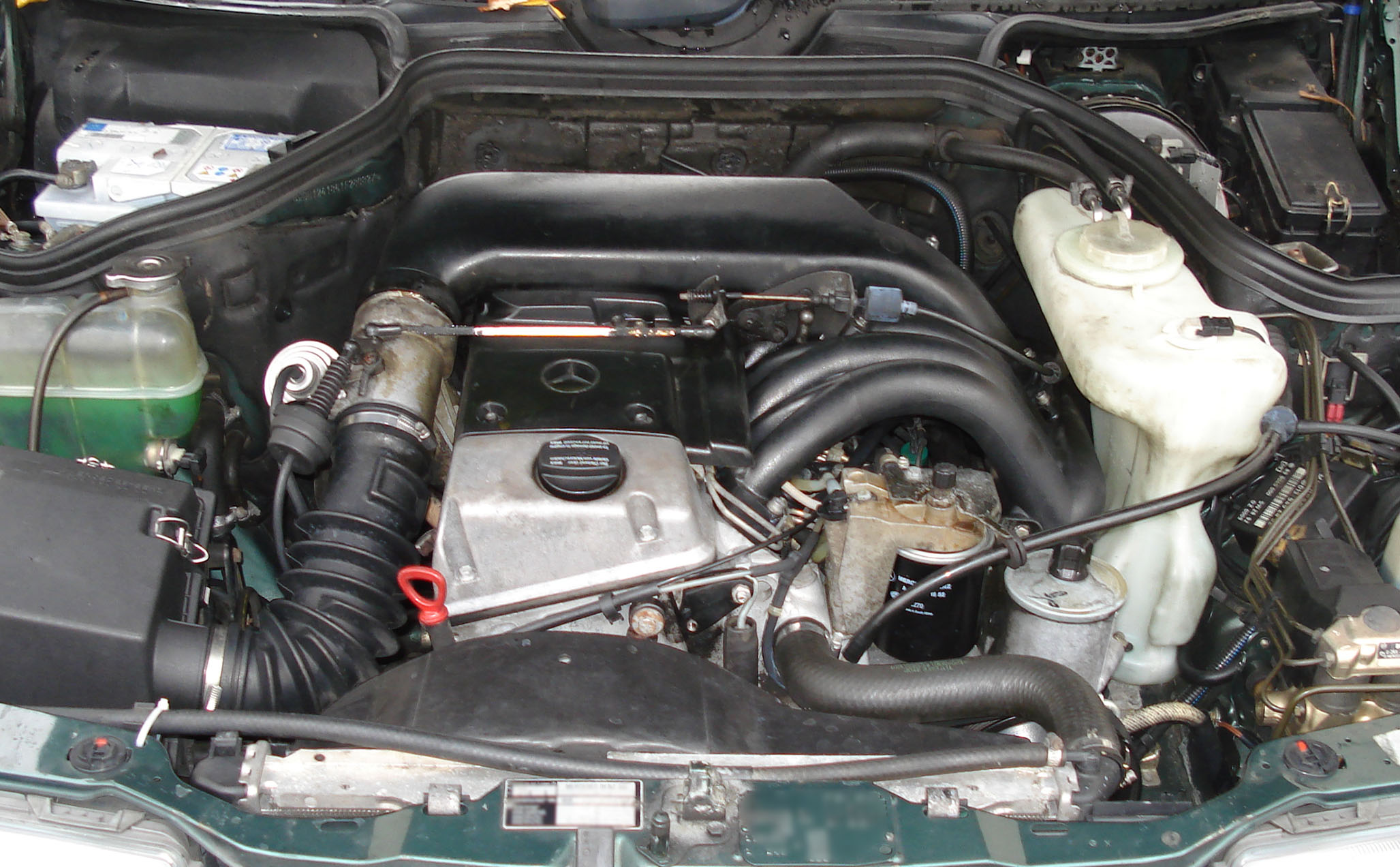

Overview
- Manufacturer: Mercedes-Benz
- Production: July 1993–2001

Layout
- Configuration: Straight-5
- Displacement: 2.5 L (2,497 cc)
- Cylinder bore: 87 mm (3.43 in)
- Piston stroke: 84 mm (3.31 in)
- Cylinder block material: Cast iron
- Cylinder head material: Aluminum
- Valvetrain: DOHC / 4 valves x cyl.
- Valvetrain drive system: Chain
- Compression ratio: 22.0:1

RPM range
- Idle speed: 650-750 (.911); 580-680 (ERE)
- Max. engine speed: 5200 RPM

Combustion
- Turbocharger: No (.91x); Yes, intercooled (.96x)
- Fuel system: Bosch in-line indirect injection M-type
- Management: RSF Governed (.911); Bosch EDC (ERE)
- Fuel type: Diesel
- Oil system: Wet sump
- Cooling system: Water-cooled

Output
- Power output: 83–110 kW (113–150 PS; 111–148 hp)
- Torque output: 170–280 N⋅m (125–207 lb⋅ft)

Emissions
- Emissions control systems: Catalytic converter Exhaust gas recirculation

Chronology
- Predecessor: Mercedes-Benz OM602 engine
- Successor: Mercedes-Benz OM612 engine

The Mercedes-Benz OM605 is a 2.5 L (2,497 cc) inline-five cylinder (R5/I5) double overhead camshaft (DOHC) diesel engine with indirect injection manufactured by Mercedes-Benz between 1993 and 2001. It replaced the single overhead camshaft (SOHC) OM602 engine.

It uses a Bosch electronically controlled inline injection pump (ERE) except in the W124 where it uses a Bosch mechanically governed inline injection pump (Bosch M pump with RSF governor).

It is related to the straight-4 2.0 and 2.2 litre OM604 and the straight-6 3.0 litre OM606 engines.

== Design ==
As per the OM602 the engine has a cast iron block and aluminum cylinder head, the block has 6 main caps, they are held by two bolts per cap. The head is a DOHC design with 4 valves per cylinder and split intake ports. As with the OM602 it has hydraulic bucket type lifters, thus eliminating periodic valve adjustment. Turbocharged engines were now intercooled, compared to their predecessors.

It has a double row timing chain that drives the injection pump and the camshafts, the sprocket is on the exhaust camshaft and both cams are connected by a gear drive, while the oil pump is driven by a separate single row chain.

== Specifications ==
ID	DIN-rated max. motive power at rpm	max. torque at rpm	aspiration	years	applications
OM 605.910 ERE	83 kW (113 PS; 111 hp) @5000 rpm	170 N⋅m (125 lb⋅ft) @2800 rpm	Natural	1993–1995	W202 C 250 D
OM 605.911	83 kW (113 PS; 111 hp) @5000 rpm	170 N⋅m (125 lb⋅ft) @2800 rpm	Natural	1993–1996	W124 E 250 D
OM 605.912 ERE	83 kW (113 PS; 111 hp) @5000 rpm	170 N⋅m (125 lb⋅ft) @2800 rpm	Natural	1996–1998	W210 E 250 D
OM 605.960 ERE	110 kW (150 PS; 148 hp) @4400 rpm	280 N⋅m (207 lb⋅ft) @1800 rpm	Turbocharger, intercooler	1995–2001	W202 C 250 Turbodiesel
OM 605.962 ERE	110 kW (150 PS; 148 hp) @4400 rpm	280 N⋅m (207 lb⋅ft) @1800 rpm	Turbocharger, intercooler	1997–1999	W210 E 250 Turbodiesel

== See also ==
- List of Mercedes-Benz engines
