= Mercedes-Benz OM611 engine =

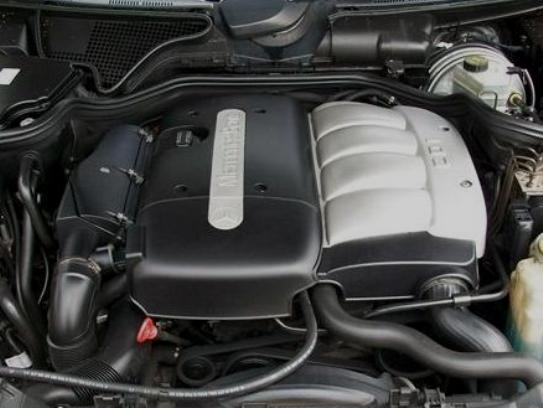

Overview
- Manufacturer: Mercedes-Benz, Force Motors
- Production: 1998–2006

Layout
- Configuration: Straight-4
- Displacement: 2.2 L (2148 cc or 2151 cc)
- Cylinder bore: 88 mm (3.5 in)
- Piston stroke: 88.3 mm (3.48 in); 88.4 mm (3.48 in)
- Valvetrain: DOHC, 4 valves per cylinder

Combustion
- Turbocharger: Yes
- Fuel system: Common rail direct injection
- Fuel type: Diesel
- Cooling system: Water cooled

Output
- Power output: 60–105 kW (82–143 PS; 80–141 hp)
- Torque output: 200–315 N⋅m (148–232 lb⋅ft)

Chronology
- Predecessor: Mercedes-Benz OM604 engine
- Successor: Mercedes-Benz OM646 engine

The Mercedes-Benz OM611 is a straight-4 diesel engine produced by Mercedes-Benz from 1998 to 2006.

In 1998 it replaced the naturally aspirated OM604 with indirect injection in the W202 C-Class and the W210 E-Class for the 1999 model year, in 102 PS (75 kW; 101 hp) and 125 PS (92 kW; 123 hp) powertrains.

In 1999 the displacement was reduced from 2.2 L; 131.3 cu in (2,151 cc) to 2.1 L; 131.1 cu in (2,148 cc) for the E-Class, and the engine were now available in 116 PS (85 kW; 114 hp) and 143 PS (105 kW; 141 hp) powertrains.

It was also introduced with the facelift of the W90x Sprinter in 2000 for the 2001 model year in 82 PS (60 kW; 81 hp), 109 PS (80 kW; 108 hp) and 129 PS (95 kW; 127 hp) powertrains, and in the W203 C-Class in 122 PS (90 kW; 120 hp) and 143 PS (105 kW; 141 hp) powertrains.

The W211 E-Class introduced in 2002 were not equipped with the OM611, but with the new OM646 engine.

Force Motors utilized the OM611 engine in two of their vehicles, namely the 2011 Force One and the 2017 Force Gurkha Xtreme.

== Technical specifications ==
Displacement	Bore	Stroke	Power	Torque	Applications
2.2 L; 131.3 cu in (2,151 cc)	88 mm 3.5 in	88.4 mm 3.48 in	102 PS (75 kW; 101 hp) @ 4200 rpm	235 N⋅m (173 lb⋅ft) @ 1500 rpm	1998 W202 C-Class; 1998 W210 E-Class
2.2 L; 131.3 cu in (2,151 cc)	88 mm 3.5 in	88.4 mm 3.48 in	125 PS (92 kW; 123 hp) @ 4200 rpm	300 N⋅m (220 lb⋅ft) @ 1800 rpm	1998 W202 C-Class; 1998 W210 E-Class
2.1 L; 131.1 cu in (2,148 cc)	88 mm 3.5 in	88.3 mm 3.48 in	82 PS (60 kW; 81 hp) @ 3800 rpm	200 N⋅m (150 lb⋅ft) @ 1400–2600 rpm	2000 W90x Sprinter
2.1 L; 131.1 cu in (2,148 cc)	88 mm 3.5 in	88.3 mm 3.48 in	109 PS (80 kW; 108 hp) @ 3800 rpm	270 N⋅m (200 lb⋅ft) @ 1400–2400 rpm	2000 W90x Sprinter
2.1 L; 131.1 cu in (2,148 cc)	88 mm 3.5 in	88.3 mm 3.48 in	116 PS (85 kW; 114 hp) @ 4200 rpm	250 N⋅m (180 lb⋅ft) @ 1400–2600 rpm	1999 W210 E-Class; 2000 W203 C-Class
2.1 L; 131.1 cu in (2,148 cc)	88 mm 3.5 in	88.3 mm 3.48 in	122 PS (90 kW; 120 hp) @ 3800 rpm	270 N⋅m (200 lb⋅ft) @ 1600–2400 rpm	2003 W203 C-Class
2.1 L; 131.1 cu in (2,148 cc)	88 mm 3.5 in	88.3 mm 3.48 in	129 PS (95 kW; 127 hp) @ 3800 rpm	300 N⋅m (220 lb⋅ft) @ 1600–2400 rpm	2000 W90x Sprinter; 2000 Eura Mobil Integra
2.1 L; 131.1 cu in (2,148 cc)	88 mm 3.5 in	88.3 mm 3.48 in	136 PS (100 kW; 134 hp) @ 4200 rpm	315 N⋅m (232 lb⋅ft) @ 1800–2600 rpm	1999 W210 E-Class for Belgium
2.1 L; 131.1 cu in (2,148 cc)	88 mm 3.5 in	88.3 mm 3.48 in	143 PS (105 kW; 141 hp) @ 4200 rpm	315 N⋅m (232 lb⋅ft) @ 1800–2600 rpm	1999 W210 E-Class; 2000 W203 C-Class; 2011 Force One; 2017 Force Gurkha Xtreme
