= Mercedes-Benz C-Class (W202) =

First generation of Mercedes-Benz C-Class

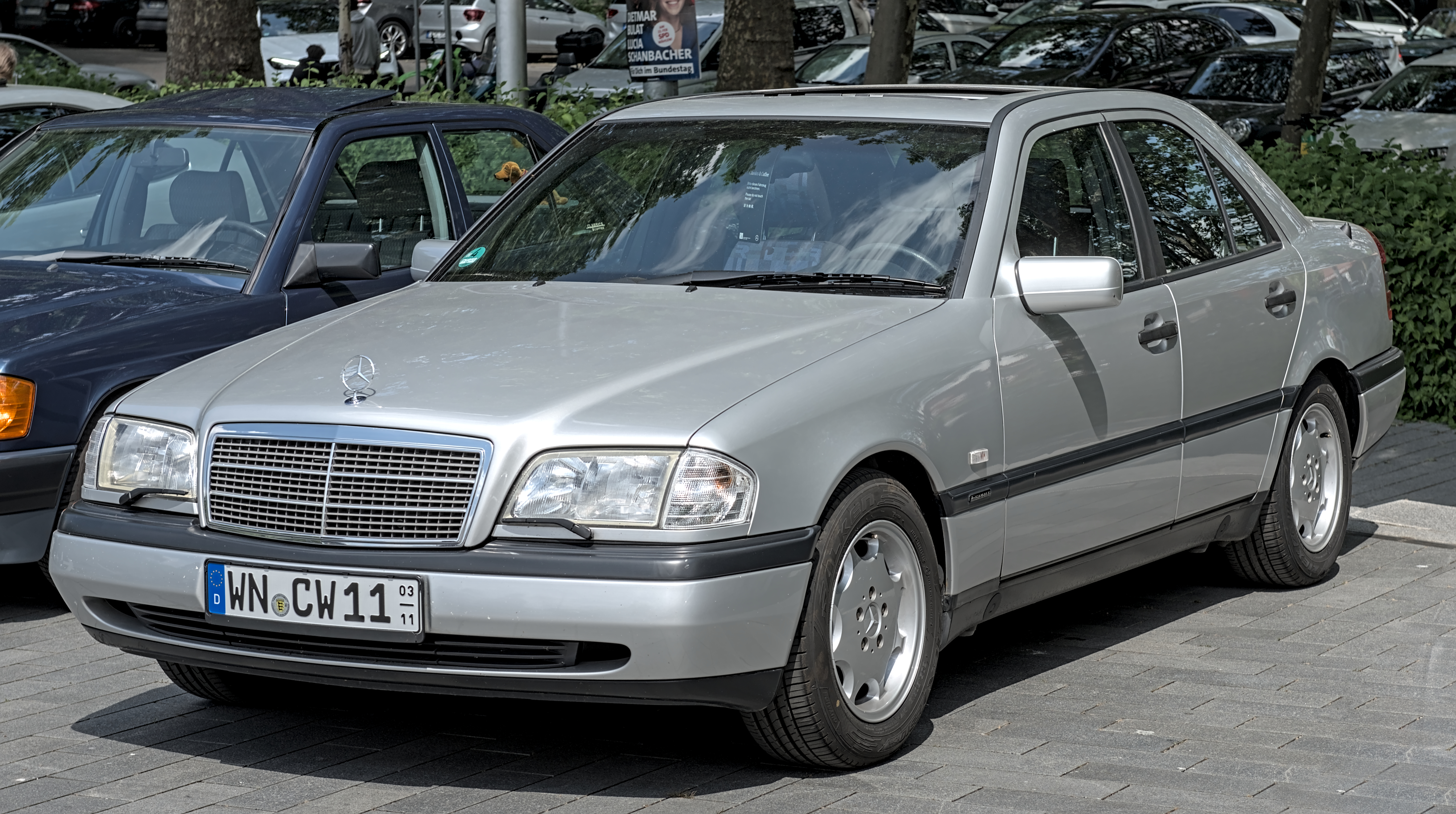

Overview
- Manufacturer: Daimler-Benz (1992–1998); DaimlerChrysler (1998–2001)
- Model code: W202 (Saloon); S202 (Wagon)
- Production: August 1992 – June 2000 (sedan); March 1995 – January 2001 (station wagon)
- Model years: 1994–2000
- Assembly: Germany: Bremen; Germany: Sindelfingen; South Africa: East London; Mexico: Santiago Tianguistenco; Mexico: Toluca; Indonesia: Bogor Regency; Vietnam: Ho Chi Minh City; Egypt: 6th October City (EGA); Thailand: Samut Prakan (TAAP)
- Designer: Olivier Boulay (1989); Murat Günak

Body and chassis
- Class: Compact executive car (D)
- Body style: 4-door sedan 5-door station wagon
- Layout: Front engine, rear-wheel drive
- Related: Mercedes-Benz CLK-Class (C208); Mercedes-Benz SLK-Class (R170)

Powertrain
- Engine: petrol: 1.8 L M111 I4 16v; 2.0 L M111 Kompressor supercharged I4 16v; 2.3 L M111 I4 16v; 2.3 L M111 Kompressor supercharged I4 16v; 2.8 L M104 I6 24v; 2.4–2.8 L M112 V6 18v; 3.6 L M104 AMG I6 24v; 4.3 L M113 AMG V8 24v; 5.4 L M113 AMG V8 24v; diesel: 2.0 L OM601 I4 SOHC 8v; 2.0–2.2 L OM604 TD I4 16v; 2.2 L OM611 CDI I4 16v; 2.5 L OM605 TD I5 20v
- Transmission: 5-speed manual; 6-speed manual; 4-speed 4G-Tronic automatic; 5-speed 5G-Tronic automatic

Dimensions
- Wheelbase: 2,670 mm (105.1 in)
- Length: 4,505 mm (177.4 in)
- Width: 1,720 mm (67.7 in)
- Height: 1,425 mm (56.1 in)

Chronology
- Predecessor: Mercedes-Benz 190 (W201)
- Successor: Mercedes-Benz C-Class (W203)

Mercedes-Benz W202 is the internal designation for a compact sedan/saloon manufactured and marketed by Mercedes-Benz between 1992 and 2001, as the first generation of the C-Class (W202), now in its fifth generation (W206). Replacing the 190 series/W201 in June 1993, the C-Class sedan was Mercedes' entry-level model until 1997, when the company launched the first generation A-Class (W168). Production reached 1,847,382 over model years 1994–2000.

== Background ==
Development started on a replacement to the 190 series in October 1986, with design work commencing in 1987 under Bruno Sacco. By 1988, the first full-scale models were made, narrowed to two design directions by December 1988. The design by Olivier Boulay was chosen in 1989 and the production design was frozen in January 1990, subsequently patented on 19 December 1990. Rough prototypes went into testing in 1989, with first production design prototypes commencing testing in 1990.

== Engines ==
The C-Class debuted with a complete lineup of multi-valve engines. The family of four-cylinder petrol units, called M111, debuted in the C 180 (1.8 L, 122 PS [90 kW; 120 hp]), C 200 (2.0 L, 136 PS [100 kW; 134 hp] and C 220 (2.2 L, 150 PS [110 kW; 148 hp], the only four-cylinder of the range sold in the U.S.). In 1997 the C 220 was replaced by the C 230, enlarged to 2.3 L displacement but with the same output, although with torque increased to 220 N⋅m (162 lb⋅ft). The C 280 was the high-end model of the class, with a four-valve-per-cylinder straight-six engine, capable of reaching 193 PS (142 kW; 190 hp).

Four-cylinder diesel models were equipped with the same OM601 engine of the 190, in the 2.0 L. Many of these diesel variants were sold as taxis, due to their low fuel consumption and strong reliability. There were also more powerful OM605 five-cylinder engines which were available in naturally aspirated (C 250 D) and turbocharged (C 250 TD) forms. The turbodiesel was introduced in 1995 and is one of the novelties in the engine range available from this year. The most important was a supercharged version of the M111 straight four, the C 230 Kompressor, using a Roots-type supercharger to generate 193 PS (142 kW; 190 hp) at 5300 rpm: Mercedes-Benz was once again utilizing supercharger technology after 50 years. Due to the tax law in Italy and Portugal, models in those countries featured a supercharged version of the smaller 2.0 L (C 200 Kompressor), which had a similar output of the C 230 Kompressor.

The 1997 diesel models featured the OM611, equipped with a common rail direct injection system (co-developed with Bosch). The new model was named C 220 CDI, and had an improved output, up by 30 PS (22 kW; 30 hp) compared with the C 220 Diesel, better fuel average and lower emissions. Also, the inline six engines were replaced by a family of V6, the M112. The new engines featured SOHC heads instead of the previous DOHC, three valves per cylinder instead of four, and twin sparkplugs. The four-cylinder C 230 was replaced by the C 240 (2.4 L V6 engine) and the straight-six C 280 changed over to a V6 of identical displacement. These changes reduced emissions and improved fuel consumption, without sacrificing power (the C 280 in fact had a slight, 4 PS [3 kW] increase with the change).

In the last four years of production, the W202 received a few changes in the choices of engine. In 1998, a less powerful version of the 2.2 L turbodiesel was added, called C 200 CDI, which replaced the C 220 Diesel. In May 2000 (after the sedan had already been discontinued, so only applying to the T-model), the C 200 Kompressor's output was cut to 163 PS (120 kW; 161 hp), the C 240 displacement was enlarged from 2.4 L to 2.6 L, but output remained at 170 PS (125 kW; 168 hp). The C 180 got a 2.0 L engine at this time as well.

Models	Production years	Engines	Power	Torque	Acceleration (0–100 km/h)	Top speed	Fuel consumption
Petrol engines
C 180	1993.03–1996.07	1,799 cc (109.8 cu in) DOHC 16V I4 (M111 E18)	90 kW (122 PS; 121 hp) at 5,500 rpm	170 N⋅m (125 lb⋅ft) at 4,200 rpm	12 seconds	193 km/h (120 mph)	8.5 L/100 km (28 mpg_{‑US})
C 180	1996.08–2000.06	1,799 cc (109.8 cu in) DOHC 16V I4 (M111 E18)	90 kW (122 PS; 121 hp) at 5,500 rpm	170 N⋅m (125 lb⋅ft) at 3,700-4,500 rpm	12 seconds	193 km/h (120 mph)	8.3 L/100 km (28 mpg_{‑US})
C 180	2000.06–2001.01	1,998 cc (121.9 cu in) DOHC 16V I4 (M111 E20 EVO)	95 kW (129 PS; 127 hp) at 5,300 rpm	190 N⋅m (140 lb⋅ft) at 4,000 rpm	T: 11.2 seconds	T: 190 km/h (118 mph)	T: 9.2 L/100 km (26 mpg_{‑US})
C 200	1993–1996	1,998 cc (121.9 cu in) DOHC 16V I4 (M111 E20)	100 kW (136 PS; 134 hp) at 5,500 rpm	190 N⋅m (140 lb⋅ft) at 4,000 rpm	11 seconds	203 km/h (126 mph)	8.6 L/100 km (27 mpg_{‑US})
C 200	1996–2000	1,998 cc (121.9 cu in) DOHC 16V I4 (M111 E20)	100 kW (136 PS; 134 hp) at 5,500 rpm	190 N⋅m (140 lb⋅ft) at 3,700-4,500 rpm	11 seconds	203 km/h (126 mph)	8.1 L/100 km (29 mpg_{‑US})
C 200 Kompressor (Note: Sold in selected markets including Greece, Italy, Portugal, Turkey, Bulgaria, Croatia, North Macedonia and Hungary)	1995–1996	1,998 cc (121.9 cu in) supercharged DOHC 16V I4 (M111 E20 ML)	132 kW (180 PS; 178 hp) at 5,300 rpm	260 N⋅m (192 lb⋅ft) at 2,500-4,800 rpm	8.8 seconds	225 km/h (140 mph)	10.6 L/100 km (22 mpg_{‑US})
C 200 Kompressor	1996–2000	1,998 cc (121.9 cu in) supercharged DOHC 16V I4 (M111 E20 ML)	141 kW (192 PS; 189 hp) at 5,300 rpm	270 N⋅m (199 lb⋅ft) at 2,500-4,800 rpm	8.4 seconds	227 km/h (141 mph)	10.6 L/100 km (22 mpg_{‑US})
C 200 Kompressor	2000.05–2001.01	1,998 cc (121.9 cu in) supercharged DOHC 16V I4 (M111 E20 ML EVO) (Note: German market only)	120 kW (163 PS; 161 hp) at 5,300 rpm	230 N⋅m (170 lb⋅ft) at 2,500-4,800 rpm	T: 9.3 seconds	T: 215 km/h (134 mph)	T: 9.4 L/100 km (25 mpg_{‑US})
C 220	1993–1996	2,199 cc (134.2 cu in) DOHC 16V I4 (M111 E22)	110 kW (150 PS; 148 hp) at 5,500 rpm	210 N⋅m (155 lb⋅ft) at 4,000 rpm	10.5 seconds	210 km/h (130 mph)	8.7 L/100 km (27 mpg_{‑US})
C 230	1996–1998	2,295 cc (140.0 cu in) DOHC 16V I4 (M111 E23)	110 kW (150 PS; 148 hp) at 5,400 rpm	220 N⋅m (162 lb⋅ft) at 3,700-4,500 rpm	10.5 seconds	210 km/h (130 mph)	9.4 L/100 km (25 mpg_{‑US})
C 230 Kompressor	1995–1996	2,295 cc (140.0 cu in) supercharged DOHC 16V I4 (M111 E23 ML)	142 kW (193 PS; 190 hp) at 5,300 rpm	280 N⋅m (207 lb⋅ft) at 2,500-4,800 rpm	8.4 seconds	230 km/h (143 mph)	9.9 L/100 km (24 mpg_{‑US})
C 230 Kompressor	1996–2000	2,295 cc (140.0 cu in) supercharged DOHC 16V I4 (M111 E23 ML)	142 kW (193 PS; 190 hp) at 5,300 rpm	280 N⋅m (207 lb⋅ft) at 2,500-4,800 rpm	8.4 seconds	230 km/h (143 mph)	9.8 L/100 km (24 mpg_{‑US})
C 240	1997.06–2000.05	2,398 cc (146.3 cu in) SOHC 18V V6 (M112 E24)	125 kW (170 PS; 168 hp) at 5,900 rpm	225 N⋅m (166 lb⋅ft) at 3,000-5,000 rpm	9.3 seconds	218 km/h (135 mph)	9.8 L/100 km (24 mpg_{‑US})
C 240	2000.06–2001.01	2,597 cc (158.5 cu in) SOHC 18V V6 (M112 E26)	125 kW (170 PS; 168 hp) at 5,500 rpm	240 N⋅m (177 lb⋅ft) at 4,500 rpm	T: 9.0 seconds	T: 217 km/h (135 mph)	T: 10.9 L/100 km (21.6 mpg_{‑US})
C 280	1993–1997	2,799 cc (170.8 cu in) DOHC 24V I6 (M104 E28)	142 kW (193 PS; 190 hp) at 5,500 rpm	270 N⋅m (199 lb⋅ft) at 3,750 rpm	8.5 seconds	230 km/h (143 mph)	10.6 L/100 km (22 mpg_{‑US})
C 280	1997–2000	2,799 cc (170.8 cu in) SOHC 18V V6 (M112 E28)	145 kW (197 PS; 194 hp) at 5,800 rpm	265 N⋅m (195 lb⋅ft) at 3,000 rpm	8.3 seconds	232 km/h (144 mph)	10.1 L/100 km (23 mpg_{‑US})
C 36 AMG	1993–1997	3,606 cc (220.1 cu in) DOHC 24V I6 (M104 E36)	206 kW (280 PS; 276 hp) at 5,750 rpm	385 N⋅m (284 lb⋅ft) at 4,000-4,750 rpm	5.8 seconds	250 km/h (155 mph)	10.7 L/100 km (22 mpg_{‑US})
C 43 AMG	1997–2000	4,266 cc (260.3 cu in) SOHC 24V V8 (M113 E43)	225 kW (306 PS; 302 hp) at 5,850 rpm	410 N⋅m (302 lb⋅ft) at 3,250-5,000 rpm	5.7 seconds	250 km/h (155 mph)	11.7 L/100 km (20.1 mpg_{‑US})
C 55 AMG	1998–2000	5,439 cc (331.9 cu in) SOHC 24V V8 (M113 E55)	255 kW (347 PS; 342 hp) at 5,500 rpm	510 N⋅m (376 lb⋅ft) at 3,000-4,300 rpm	5.5 seconds	250 km/h (155 mph)	11.9 L/100 km (19.8 mpg_{‑US})
Diesel engines
C 200 Diesel	1993–1995	1,997 cc (121.9 cu in) SOHC 8V I4 (OM601 D20)	55 kW (75 PS; 74 hp) at 4,600 rpm	130 N⋅m (96 lb⋅ft) at 2,000-3,600 rpm	19.6 seconds	160 km/h (99 mph)	6.6 L/100 km (36 mpg_{‑US})
C 200 Diesel	1996.04–1998.07	1,997 cc (121.9 cu in) DOHC 16V I4 (OM604 D20) (Note: Portuguese market only)	65 kW (88 PS; 87 hp) at 5,000 rpm	135 N⋅m (100 lb⋅ft) at 2,000-4,650 rpm	-	172 km/h (107 mph)	7.4 L/100 km (32 mpg_{‑US})
C 200 CDI	1998–1999	2,151 cc (131.3 cu in) turbocharged DOHC 16V I4 (OM611 DE22 LA red.)	75 kW (102 PS; 101 hp) at 4,200 rpm	235 N⋅m (173 lb⋅ft) at 1,500-2,600 rpm	13.1 seconds	185 km/h (115 mph)	6.1 L/100 km (39 mpg_{‑US})
C 200 CDI	1999–2000	2,148 cc (131.1 cu in) turbocharged DOHC 16V I4 (OM611 DE22 LA red.)	75 kW (102 PS; 101 hp) at 4,200 rpm	235 N⋅m (173 lb⋅ft) at 1,500-2,600 rpm	13.1 seconds	185 km/h (115 mph)	6.1 L/100 km (39 mpg_{‑US})
C 220 Diesel	1993–1999	2,155 cc (131.5 cu in) DOHC 16V I4 (OM604 D22)	70 kW (95 PS; 94 hp) at 5,000 rpm	150 N⋅m (111 lb⋅ft) at 3,100-4,500 rpm	16.3 seconds	175 km/h (109 mph)	6.9 L/100 km (34 mpg_{‑US})
C 220 CDI	1998–1999	2,151 cc (131.3 cu in) turbocharged DOHC 16V I4 (OM611 DE22 LA)	92 kW (125 PS; 123 hp) at 4,200 rpm	300 N⋅m (221 lb⋅ft) at 1,800-2,600 rpm	10.5 seconds	198 km/h (123 mph)	6.1 L/100 km (39 mpg_{‑US})
C 220 CDI	1999–2000	2,148 cc (131.1 cu in) turbocharged DOHC 16V I4 (OM611 DE22 LA)	92 kW (125 PS; 123 hp) at 4,200 rpm	300 N⋅m (221 lb⋅ft) at 1,800-2,600 rpm	10.5 seconds	198 km/h (123 mph)	6.1 L/100 km (39 mpg_{‑US})
C 250 Diesel	1993–1996	2,497 cc (152.4 cu in) DOHC 20V I5 (OM605 D25)	83 kW (113 PS; 111 hp) at 5,000 rpm	170 N⋅m (125 lb⋅ft) at 2,800-4,600 rpm	15 seconds	190 km/h (118 mph)	7.0 L/100 km (34 mpg_{‑US})
C 250 Turbodiesel	1995–2000	2,497 cc (152.4 cu in) turbocharged DOHC 20V I5 (OM605 D25)	110 kW (150 PS; 148 hp) at 4,400 rpm	280 N⋅m (207 lb⋅ft) at 1,800-3,600 rpm	10.2 seconds	203 km/h (126 mph)	7.3 L/100 km (32 mpg_{‑US})

== Transmissions ==
The original W202 came standard in Germany with a five-speed manual and four-speed automatic transmissions optional. In the United States, automatic transmission was standard, with manual available as a delete option (with few choosing to do so). The four-speed automatic was the 722.4 version of the 4G-TRONIC. In 1996, this old transmission—released in 1981—was replaced by a five-speed automatic, the 722.6 or 5G-TRONIC, which received a manual shift mode in 1999 (722.6). In 2000, with the T-Model only remaining on sale, the RWD C 240 was available with the optional six-speed G56 manual from the W203.

== Safety ==
At the launch the C-Class had a standard driver airbag, ABS and integrated side-impact protection; the front passenger airbag became standard from 1995 onwards, and from the same period Traction control (ETS in the 4-cylinder models, combined with limited-slip differential (ASD) or ASR in the 6 cylinders models) was available as extra cost. In 1997 ASR became standard in the C 280s equipped with the automatic transmission and in the C 36 AMG, as ETS in the 4-cylinder models, except for the C 180 and the C 220 Diesel.

With the 1997 restyling ASR became standard in all the models, except in the C 180 and C 220 Diesel. This last model continued to offer ETS available as extra cost. Moreover, front side airbags and Brake assist (BAS) came in the list of standard safety features. The two basic models finally joined ASR in 1998, and, in 1999, the W202 was the first compact sedan to offer ESP as standard in all the range.

=== Crash test ratings ===
Euro NCAP adult occupant:	2/5 stars
Euro NCAP pedestrian (pre-2002 rating):	2/4 stars

NHTSA crash test ratings (1997):
Frontal Driver:	4/5 stars
Frontal Passenger:	4/5 stars
Side Driver:	3/5 stars
Side Rear Passenger:	4/5 stars

== AMG models ==
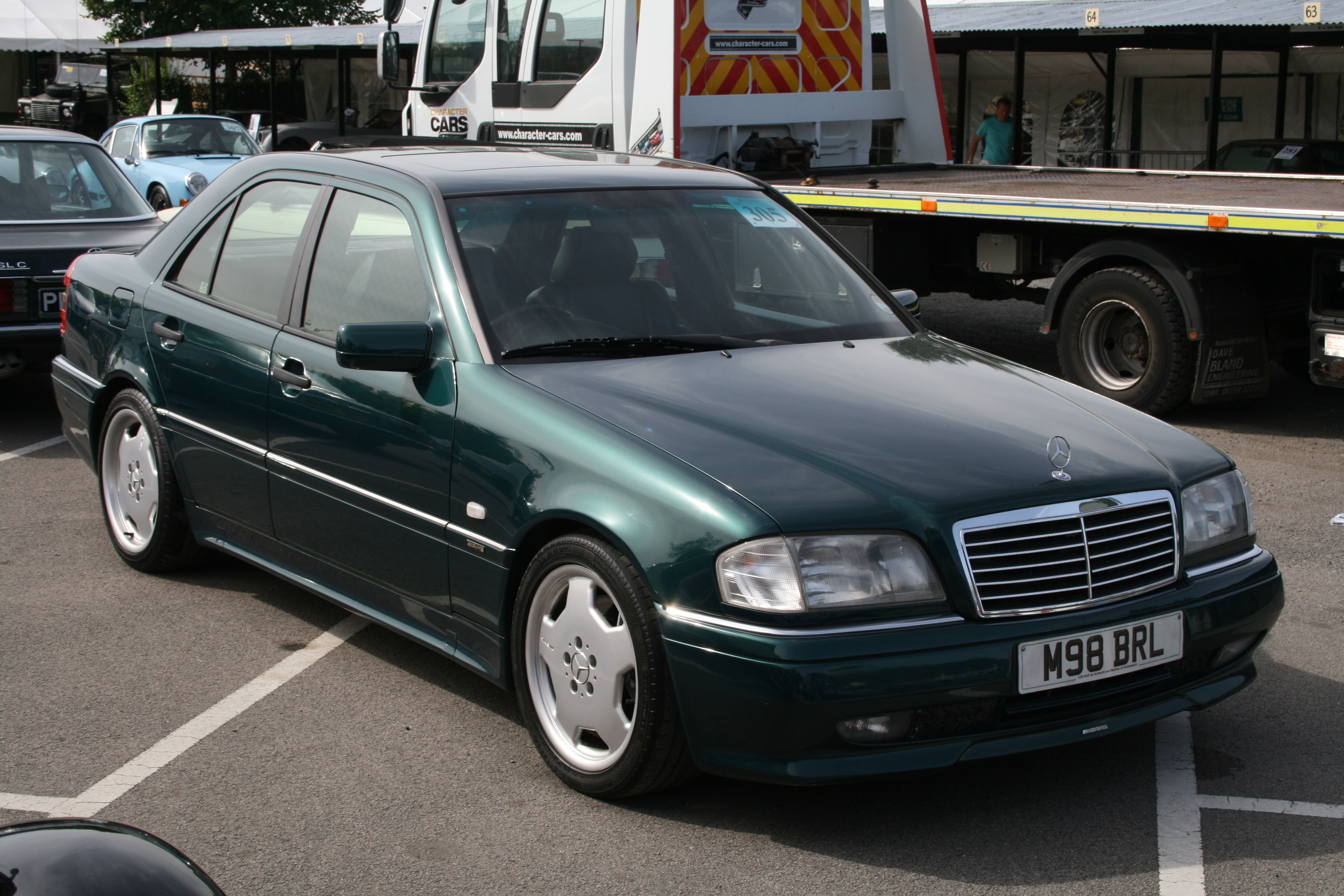
Mercedes-Benz C 36 AMG

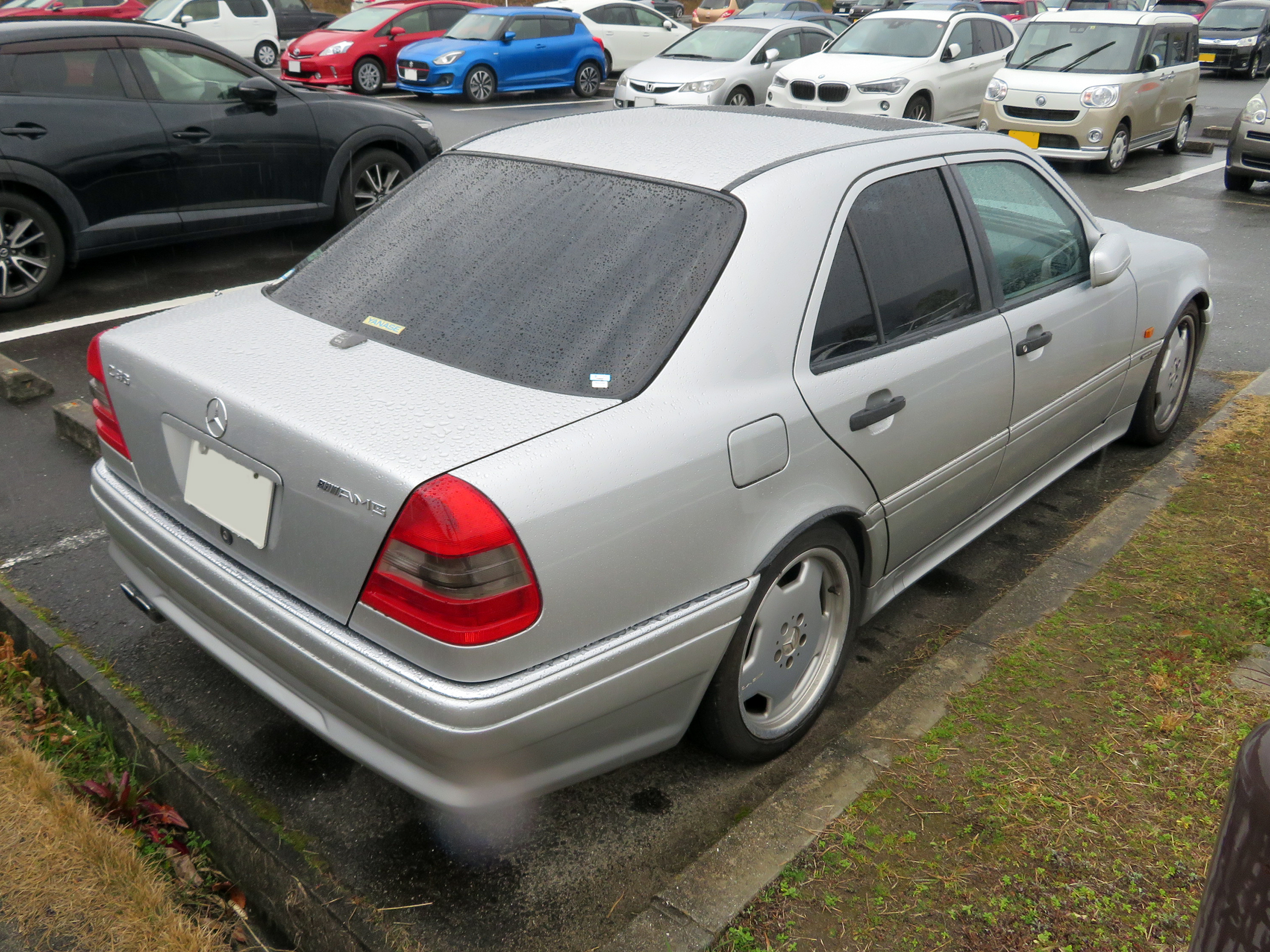
Mercedes-Benz C 36 AMG

=== C 36 AMG ===
In 1993, the C-Class received its first genuine performance model, the C 36 AMG, to counter the new six-cylinder BMW M3. Developed with AMG, the tuning house that had now become a subsidiary of Daimler-Benz, it had racing-tuned suspension (lowered by 25 mm (1 in)) and in the US, a four-speed automatic gearbox, followed by a standard five-speed automatic gearbox. The 3.6 L engine had a general output of 280 PS (206 kW; 276 hp) at 5750 rpm and 385 N⋅m (284 lb⋅ft) at 4000 rpm. AMG later conceded that since the engine was hand-assembled, power outputs could vary slightly from 276 hp (206 kW) to 287 hp (214 kW). The C36 AMG accelerates to 60 mph (97 km/h) from a stop in 5.8 seconds and top speed was electronically limited to 250 km/h (155 mph). Unlimited Top Speed was recorded at 272 km/h (169 mph). Only a total of 5200 C36 AMGs were produced.

=== C 43 AMG ===
In late 1997 (1998 model year) AMG released a new flagship for the C-Class, the C 43 AMG, powered by a 4.3 L V8, which could now achieve 310 PS (228 kW; 306 hp) at 5850 rpm, with a torque of 410 N⋅m (302 lb⋅ft) at 3250 rpm. Unlike the C36, which was in fact a "ready-to-sell" C280 disassembled for tuning at the AMG factory, the C43 was the first AMG car to be completely assembled at the Mercedes factory after the acquisition of AMG by Daimler-Benz in 1998. The C43 AMG can achieve a 0–100 km/h (0–62 mph) time in 5.7 seconds for the saloon version and 5.9 seconds for the estate. The C43 was the first C-Class to be equipped with a Mercedes-Benz V8 engine.

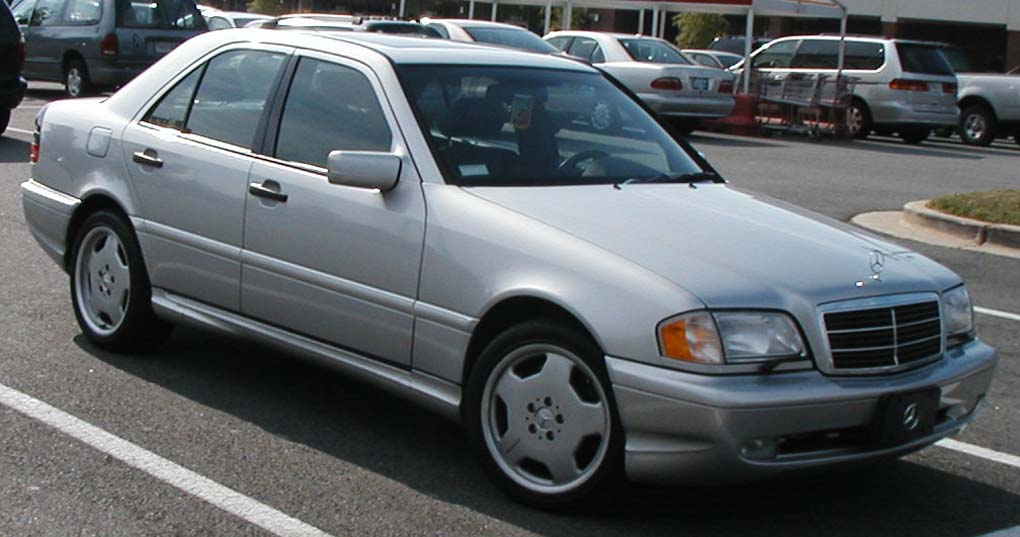
Mercedes-Benz C 43 AMG (US)

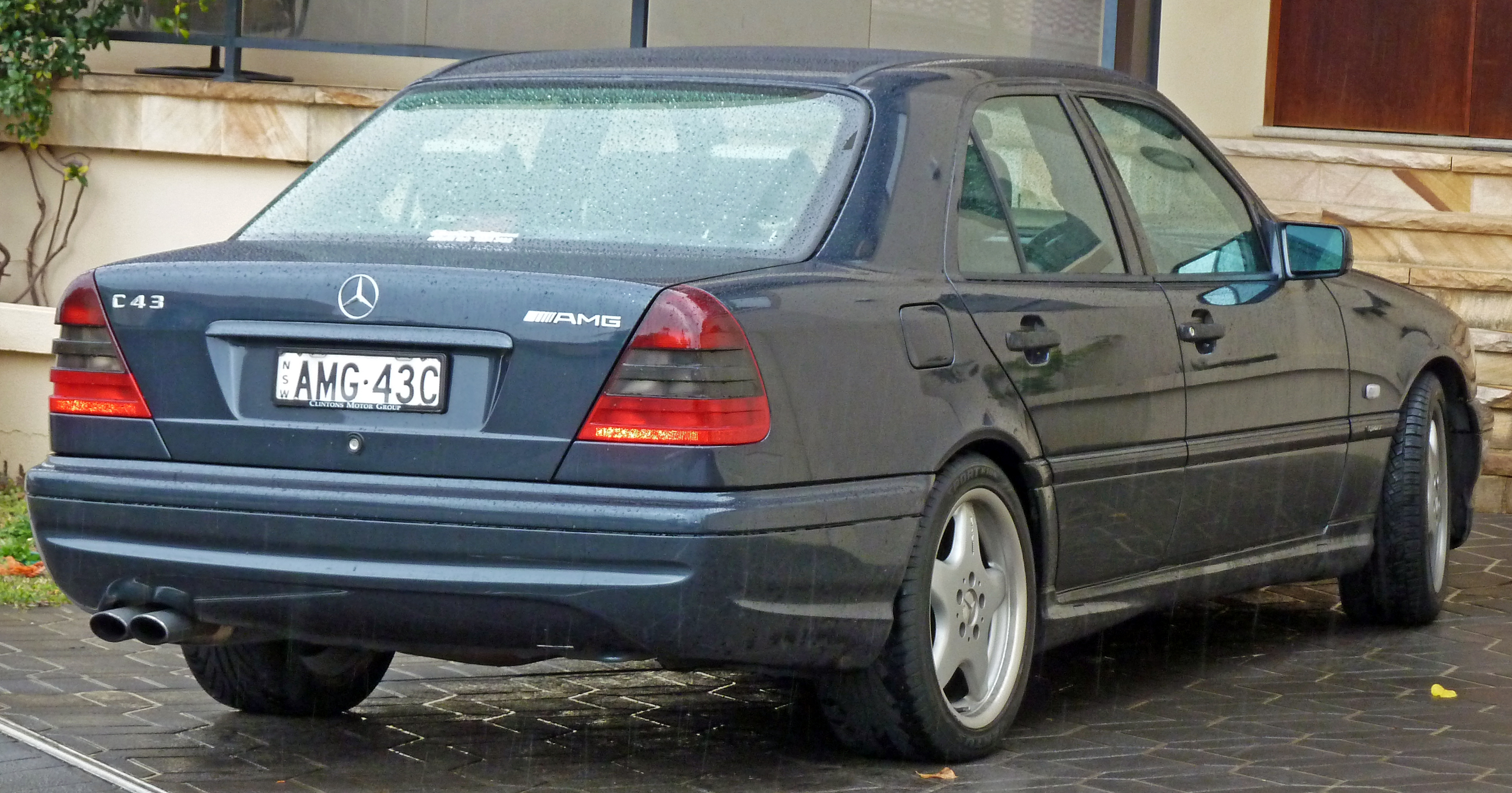
Mercedes-Benz C 43 AMG (Australia)

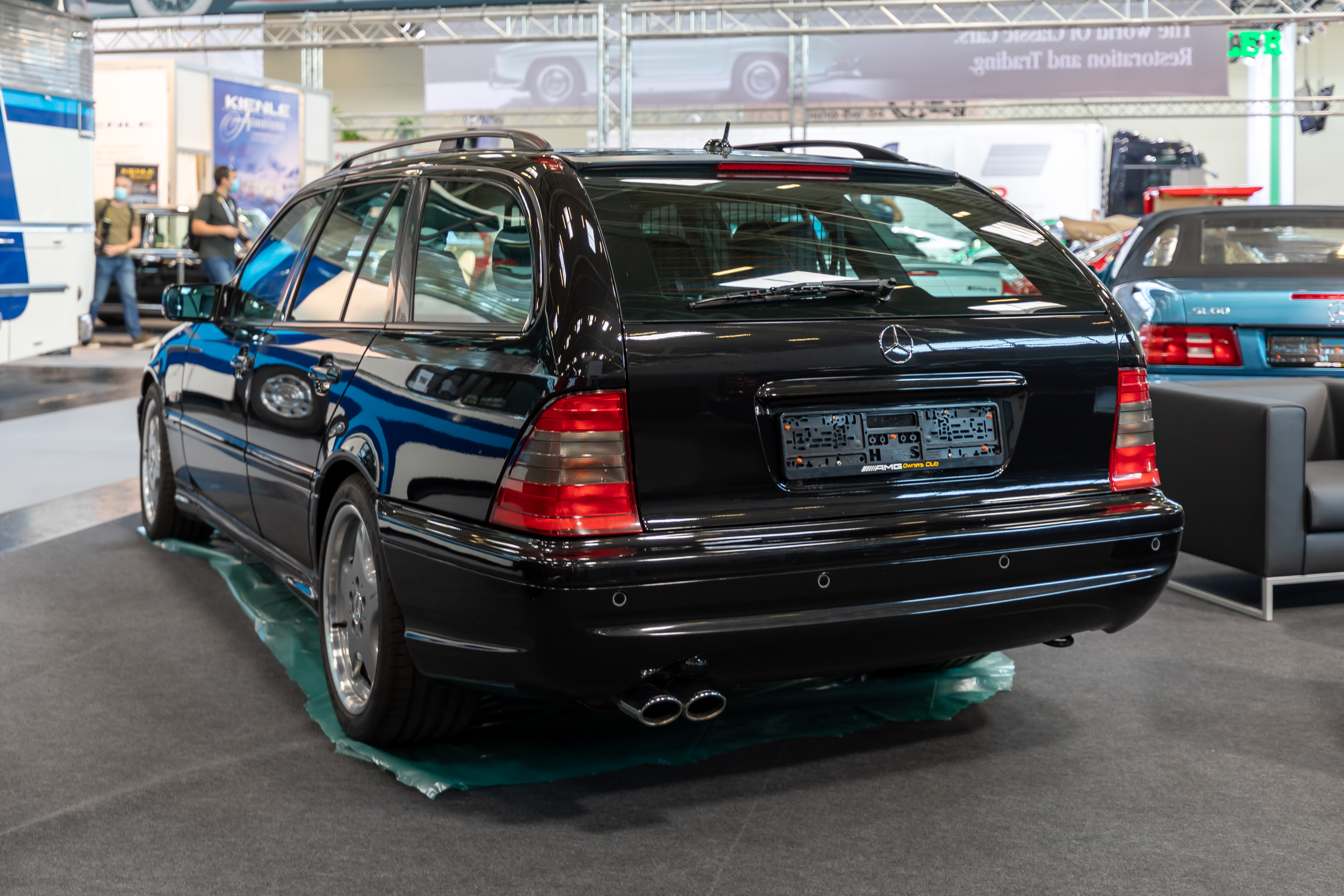
C 43 T AMG (Europe)

Two versions exist: a saloon (chassis W202.033) and estate also called the "T version" (chassis W202.093). The overall body of the C43 AMG estate version has many similarities with the C36 AMG, except for the front and rear bumpers as well as the side body, both of which were re-designed. The black engine cover with the chrome AMG and Mercedes-Benz star logos is also very typical from that period in this market segment.

Some differences have been reported between the 1998 and the 2000 version such as the ECU software on the 2000 version that seems to provide better gearbox performances and longer life to the gearbox. The 2000 model also gives the ability to power tilt the steering wheel and manually shift with a tiptronic shift gate for all W202s, and AMG stamped letters on the brake calipers (C43 only).

The car was manufactured for a little more than two years – from the end of 1997 to the spring of 2000 for a total of 4,200 units 20% of which are estates and 80% saloons, with only 25 C 43 vehicles of the 2000 model year imported to the US.

The C43 is powered by a tuned version of the 4.3-litre M113 V8 engine originally found on the W210 E 430 model. After modifications this engine delivers 306 PS (225 kW; 302 hp) at 5,850 rpm, up to 410 N⋅m (302 lb⋅ft) of torque at 3,250 rpm-5,000 rpm (taken at the crank) and up to 241 hp (180 kW) at 6,320 rpm measured at the wheels. According to Mercedes-Benz, the car can reach 155.5 mph (250.3 km/h), with electronic speed limitation and 168 mph (270 km/h) without. Transmission is an AMG-modified version of the five-speed automatic gearbox (722.6) found on 1998–2000 R129 SL 500. Main modifications were made in order to achieve a crisper and better adapted gearbox to higher-rpm upshifts. Also the braking system has been taken from the W210 E 55 AMG.

=== C 55 AMG ===
From 1998 a conversion option was available to outfit the C 43 AMG with a 5.4-litre M113 V8 engine producing 347 PS; 342 hp (255 kW) at 5500 rpm and 510 N⋅m (376 lbf⋅ft) at 4300 rpm. This would precede the series produced C 55 AMG which was introduced in 2005, based on the W203 platform and used a version of the same 5.4 litre M113 engine.

== US-spec models ==
W202s in North America included the C220 (later replaced by the C230), C280 (both I6 and V6) and the AMG variants. It was launched in the U.S. in November 1993, and unlike models in Europe, featured a third brake light, no specific trim levels, and side markers integrated into the front-turn signals. The U.S. models also did not have the hazard triangle, which is regularly located in the trunk in case of a road emergency.

The AMG variants rode about an inch higher than Euro spec models. The top speed was also electronically limited for non AMG variants to 130 mph (210 km/h) in the US due to tire speed restrictions. The C43 AMG was able to go 155 mph in the U.S. just like the Euro spec models.

== Facelift ==
In 1997, the C-Class was given a small midlife freshening, with new darker rear tail light lenses, new wheel rims as well as subtle interior trim changes, including on the door mouldings. The exterior radio antenna was no longer fender mounted and was integrated into the rear glass. The front and rear bumpers were also reshaped, colour-coded side skirts were also fitted. The revised C 200 and C 230 models were fitted with a supercharger and denoted on the trunk lid as a "Kompressor".

Pre-facelift

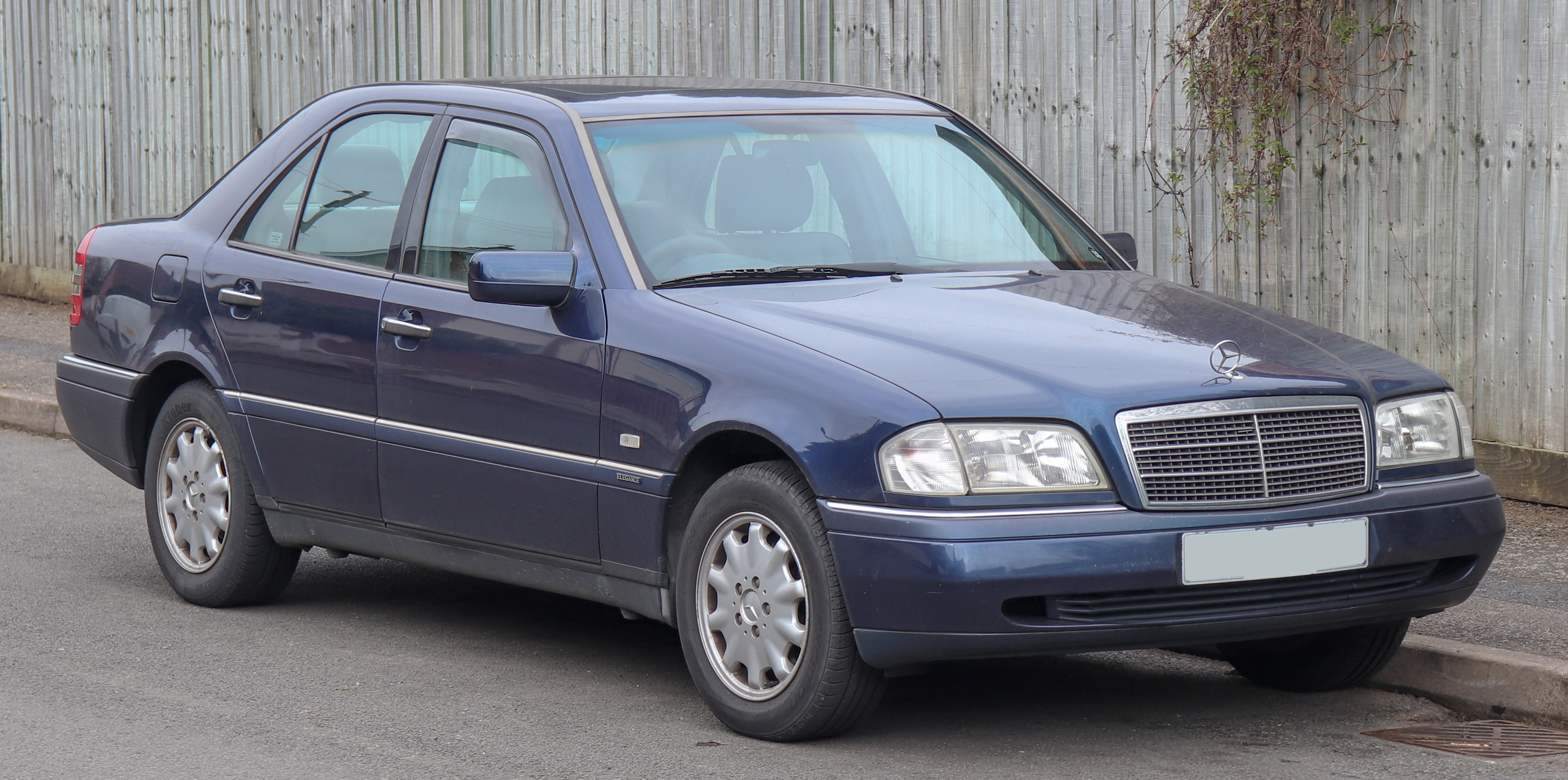
Pre-facelift front (sedan)

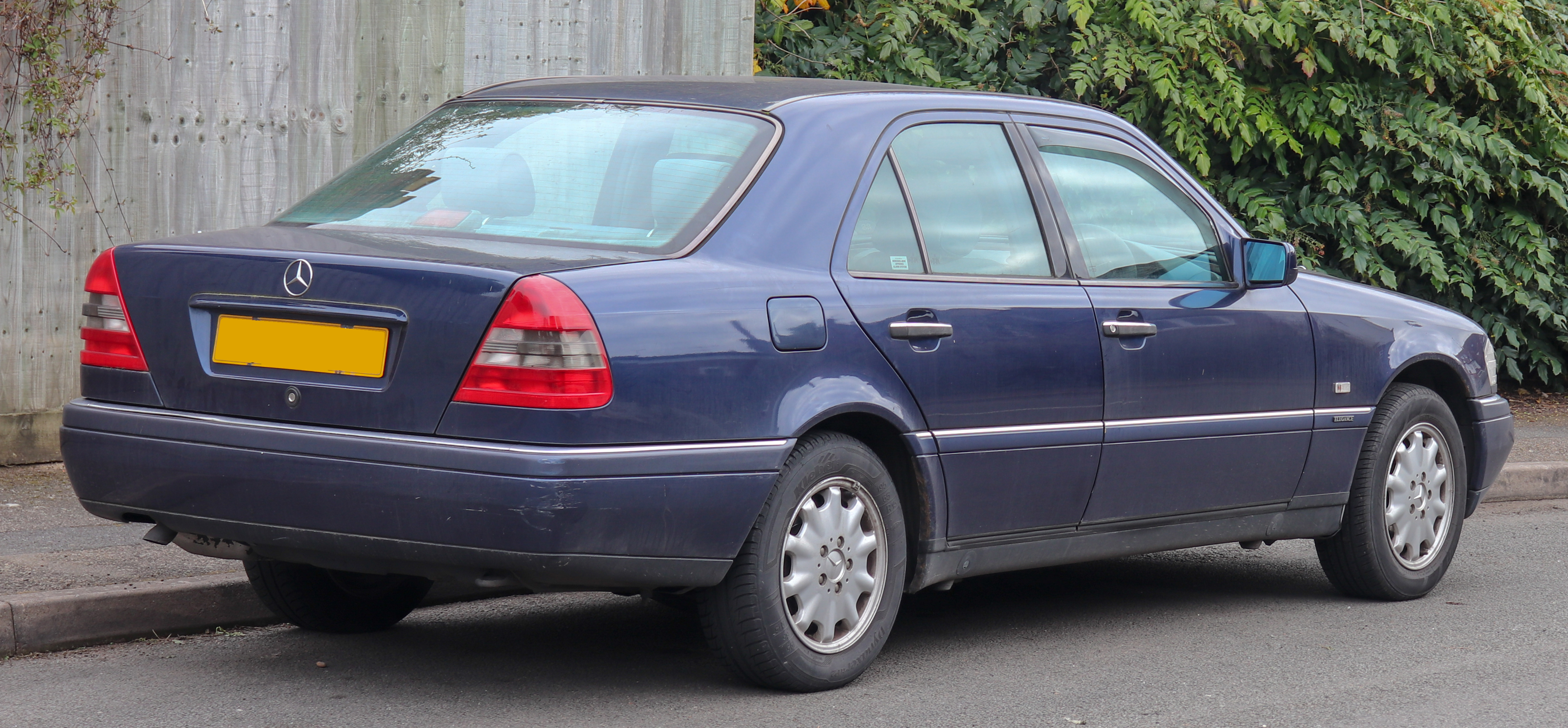
Pre-facelift rear (sedan)

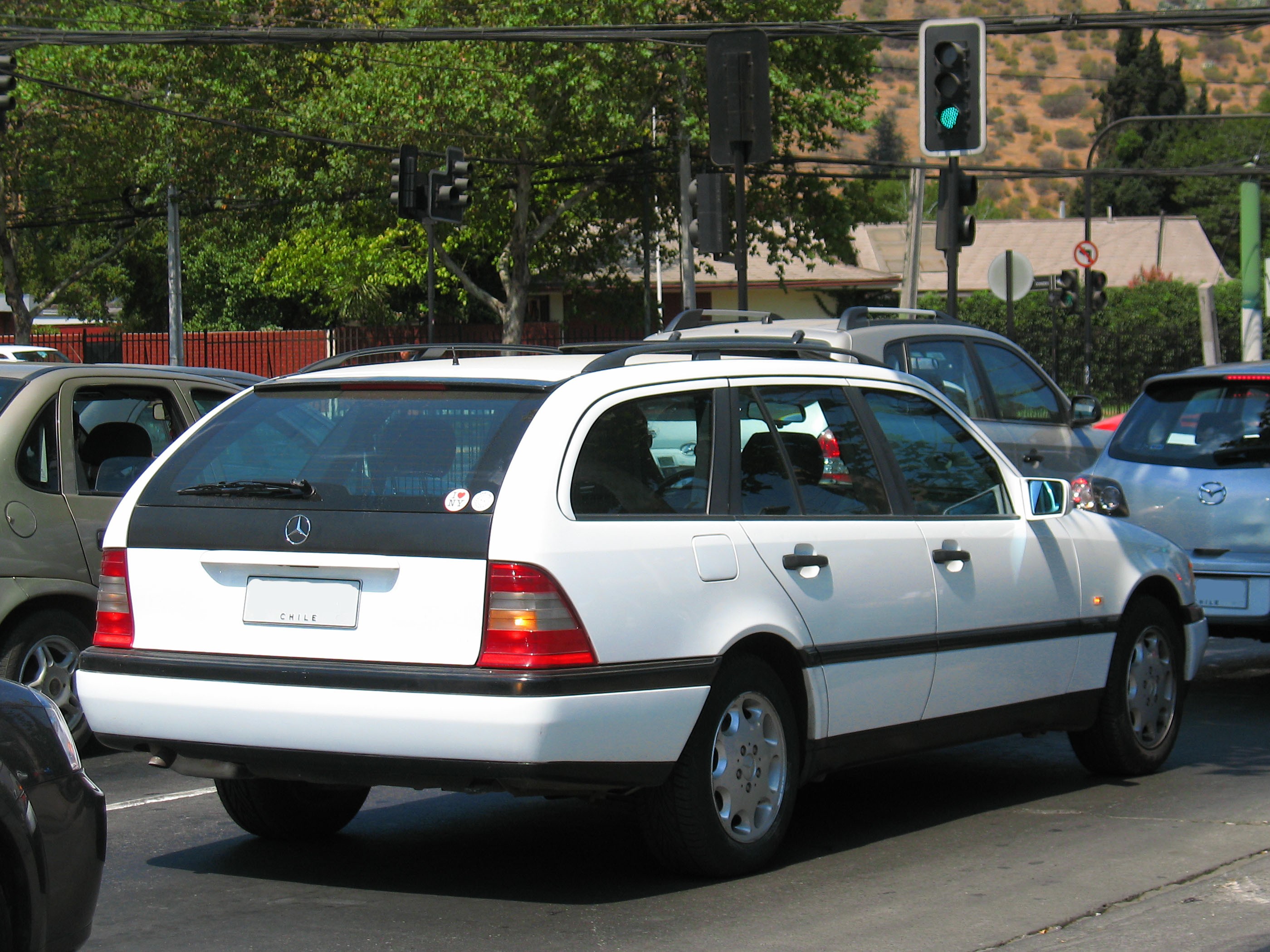
Pre-facelift station wagon

Facelift

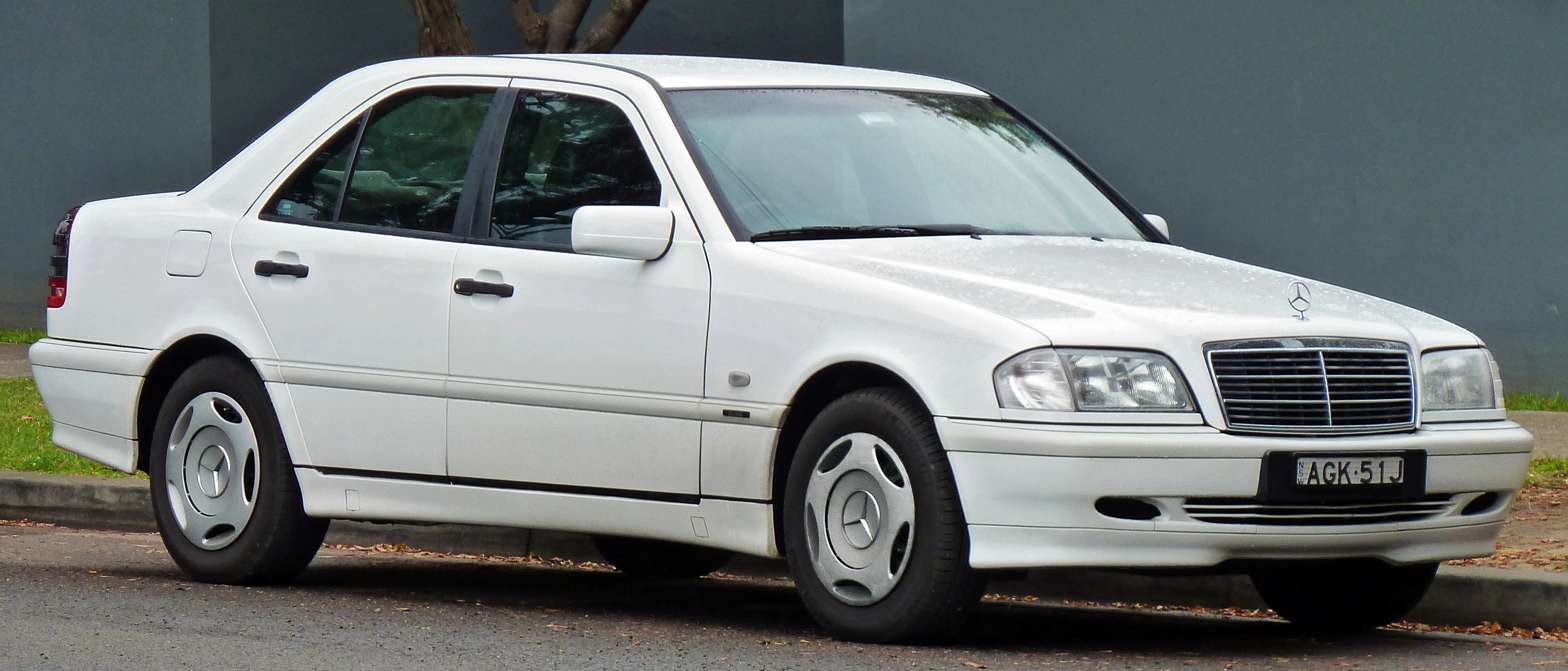
Facelift front (sedan)

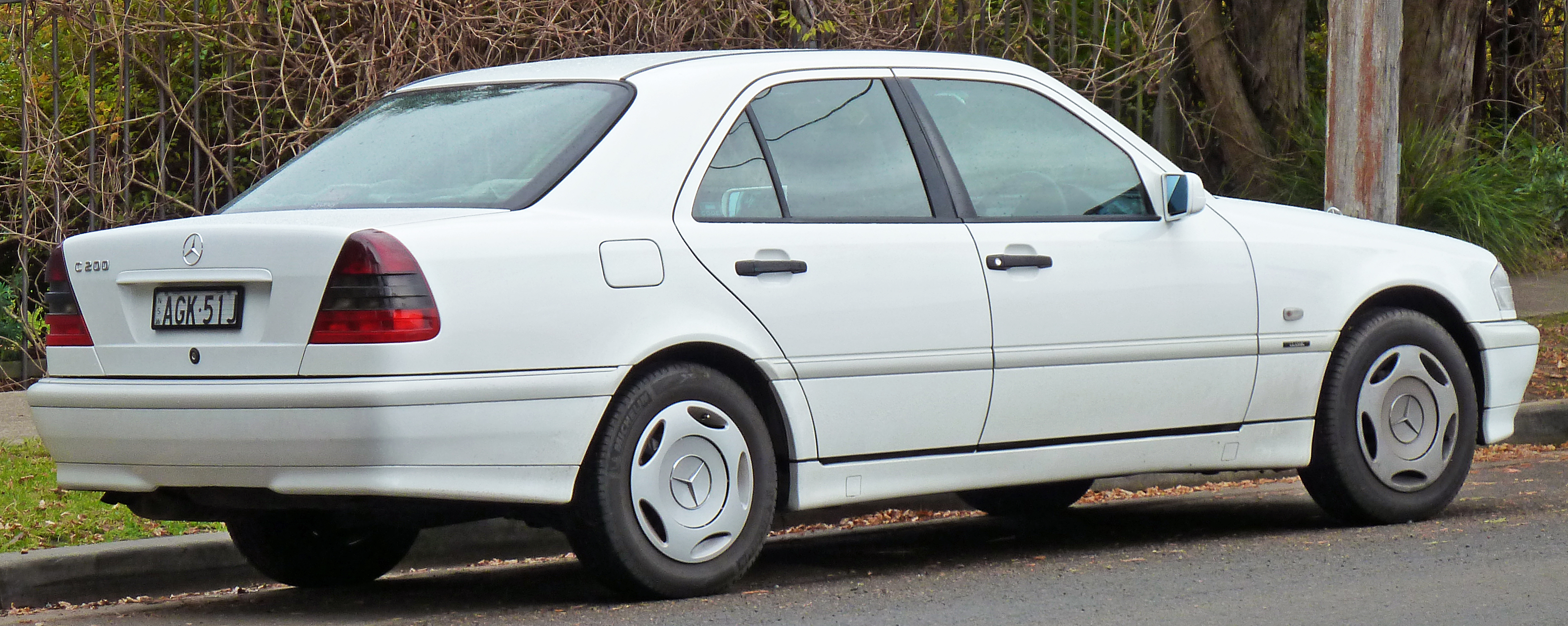
Facelift rear (sedan)

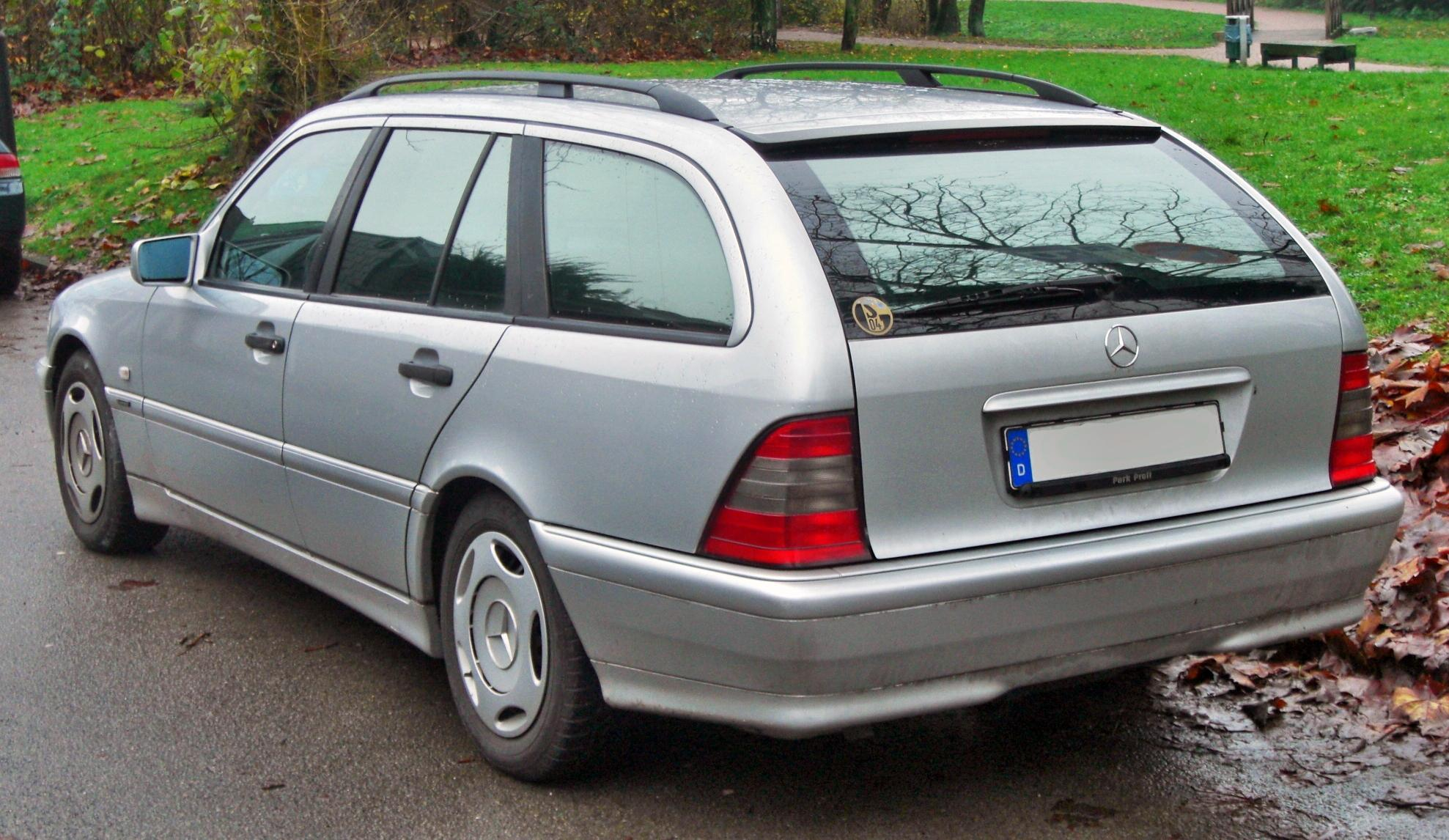
Facelift station wagon
