= SsangYong Kyron =

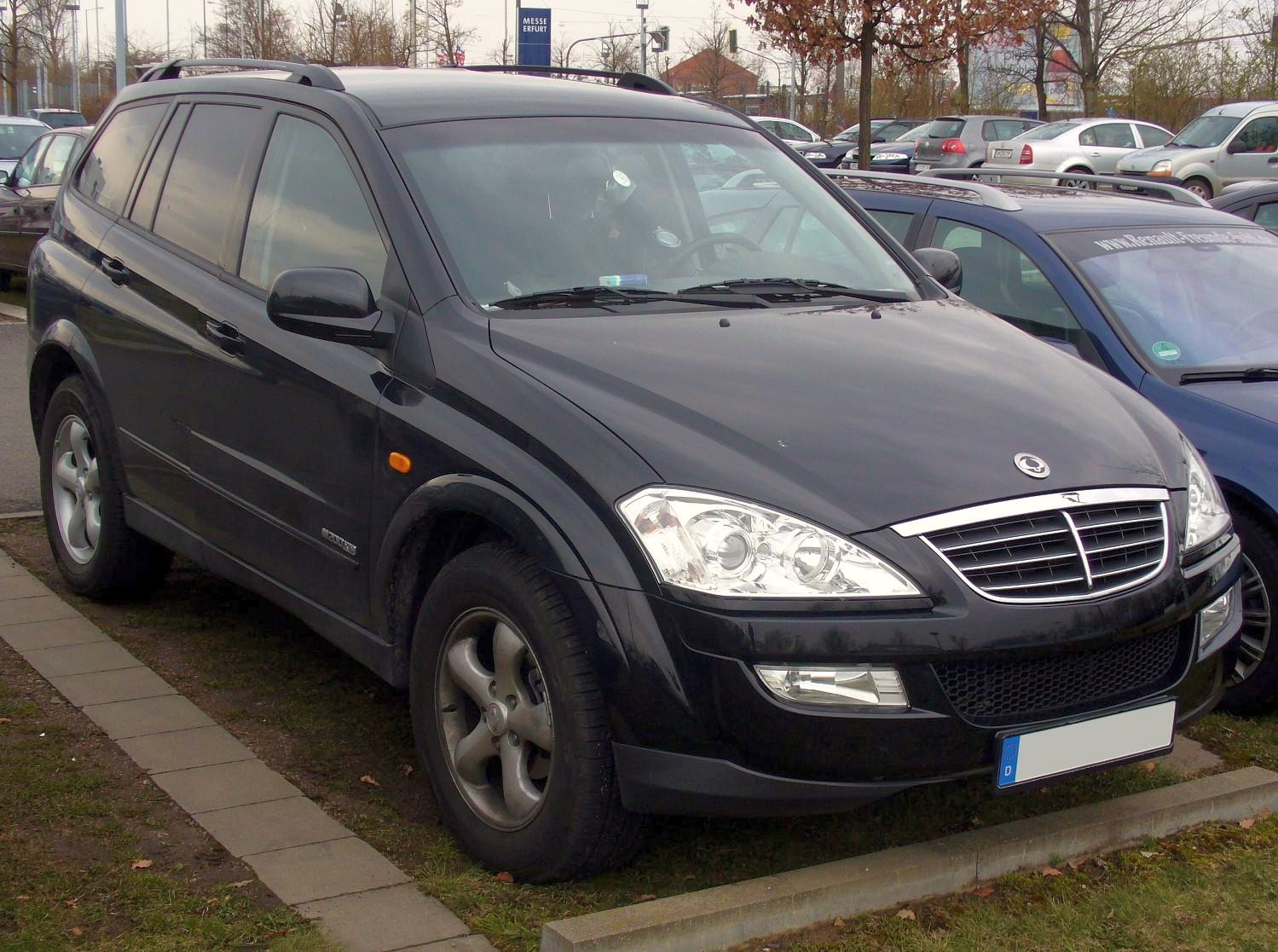
- Facelifted SsangYong Kyron

Overview
- Manufacturer: SsangYong Motor
- Production: 2005–2015
- Assembly: Pyeongtaek, South Korea (2005-2011); Naberezhnye Chelny, Russia (2006–2009); Vladivostok, Russia (2009–2015); Kremenchuk, Ukraine (2006-2015)(Kremenchuk Auto); Kostanai, Kazakhstan (2006-2015)

Body and chassis
- Class: Mid-size SUV
- Body style: 5-door SUV
- Layout: Front-engine, rear-wheel-drive; Front-engine, four-wheel-drive
- Related: Roewe W5

Powertrain
- Engine: 2.0 L e-XDI 200 D20DT/OM664 I4-T (diesel); 2.7 L XDi 270 I5-T (diesel); 2.3 L M111 I4 (petrol); 3.2 L RX 320 M104 I6 (petrol)
- Transmission: 5-speed 5G-Tronic (W722-6) automatic

Dimensions
- Wheelbase: 2,740 mm (107.9 in)
- Length: 4,660 mm (183.5 in)
- Width: 1,880 mm (74.0 in)
- Height: 1,755 mm (69.1 in)

Chronology
- Predecessor: SsangYong Musso SUV
- Successor: SsangYong Rexton; KGM Torres

The SsangYong Kyron is a mid-size SUV built by the SsangYong Motor Company. It had a Mercedes-Benz diesel engine and was designed by Ken Greenley. It received a facelift in 2007. The name of the car is an inaccurate portmanteau made combining the pronounced sound of the mathematical symbol chi (/ˈkaɪ/) and the word run, which is intended to mean "infinite run."

== Engines ==
The 270XDi diesel engine is available on the Kyron increasing the performance to 121–138 kW (162–185 hp)/340–350 N⋅m (250–260 lb⋅ft). Both the 200XDi and 270XDi uses the 3rd-generation Common Rail technology. The direct injection system slightly boosts the power and fuel efficiency. The new third generation ECU is operating on 32-bit platform rather than the 16-bit found on the previous 2 generations of common-rail technology. There is also 3.2 (G32D) engine available reaching up to 162 kW - 220 hp and 2.3 patrol engine avalaible with 112 kW (150 hp)/310 N⋅m (230 lb⋅ft). The transmission on all models is Mercedes-Benz 5G-Tronic model W722-6 5 speed.

A hybrid model was also due to be released using the same system as the C200 Eco.

== Motorsport ==
In the 2009 Dakar Rally, Isidre Esteve Pujol and team mate Eric Auge Medina came 71st in a Kyron 2.7DCI.

== Gallery ==
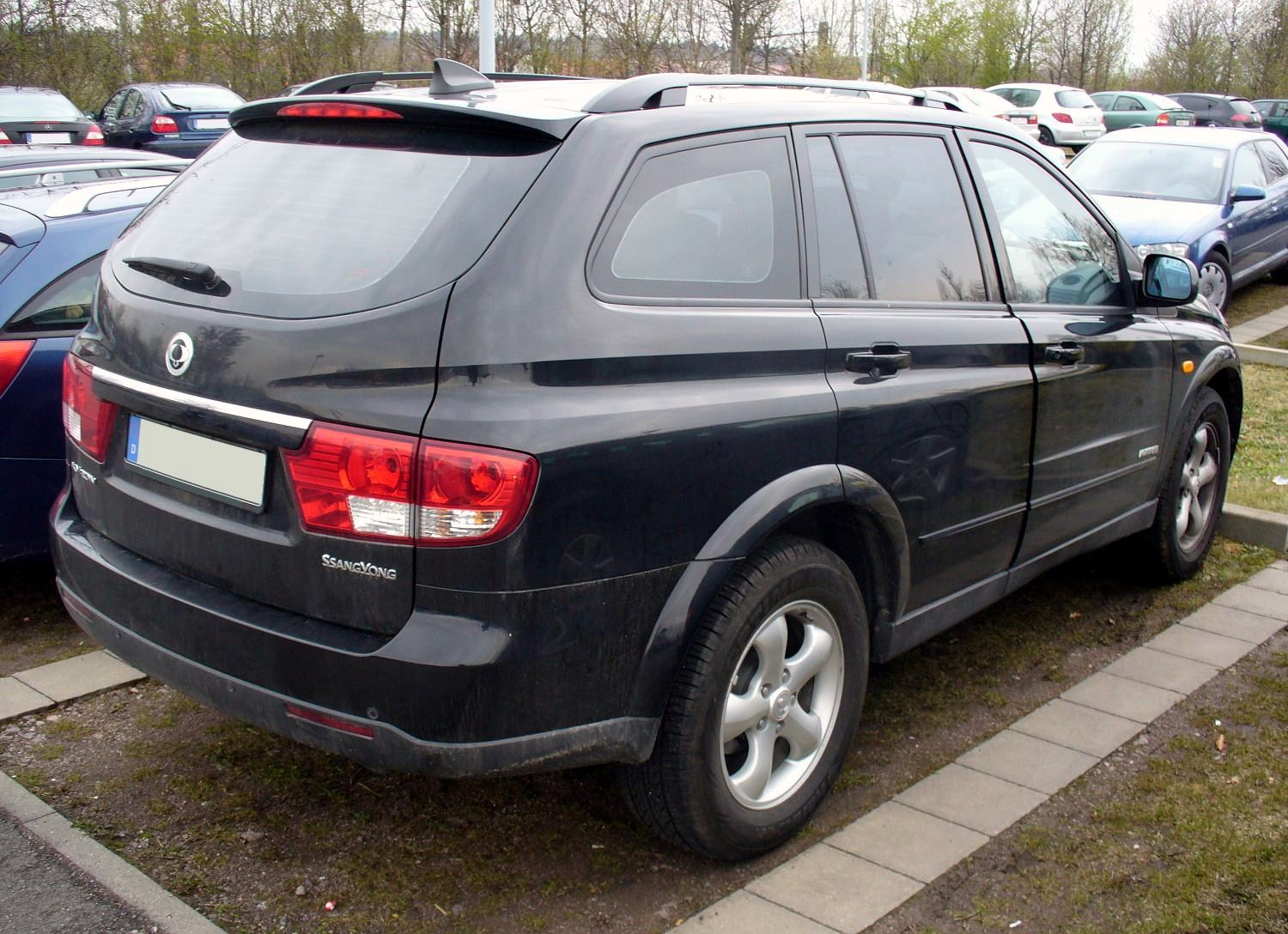
Kyron facelift

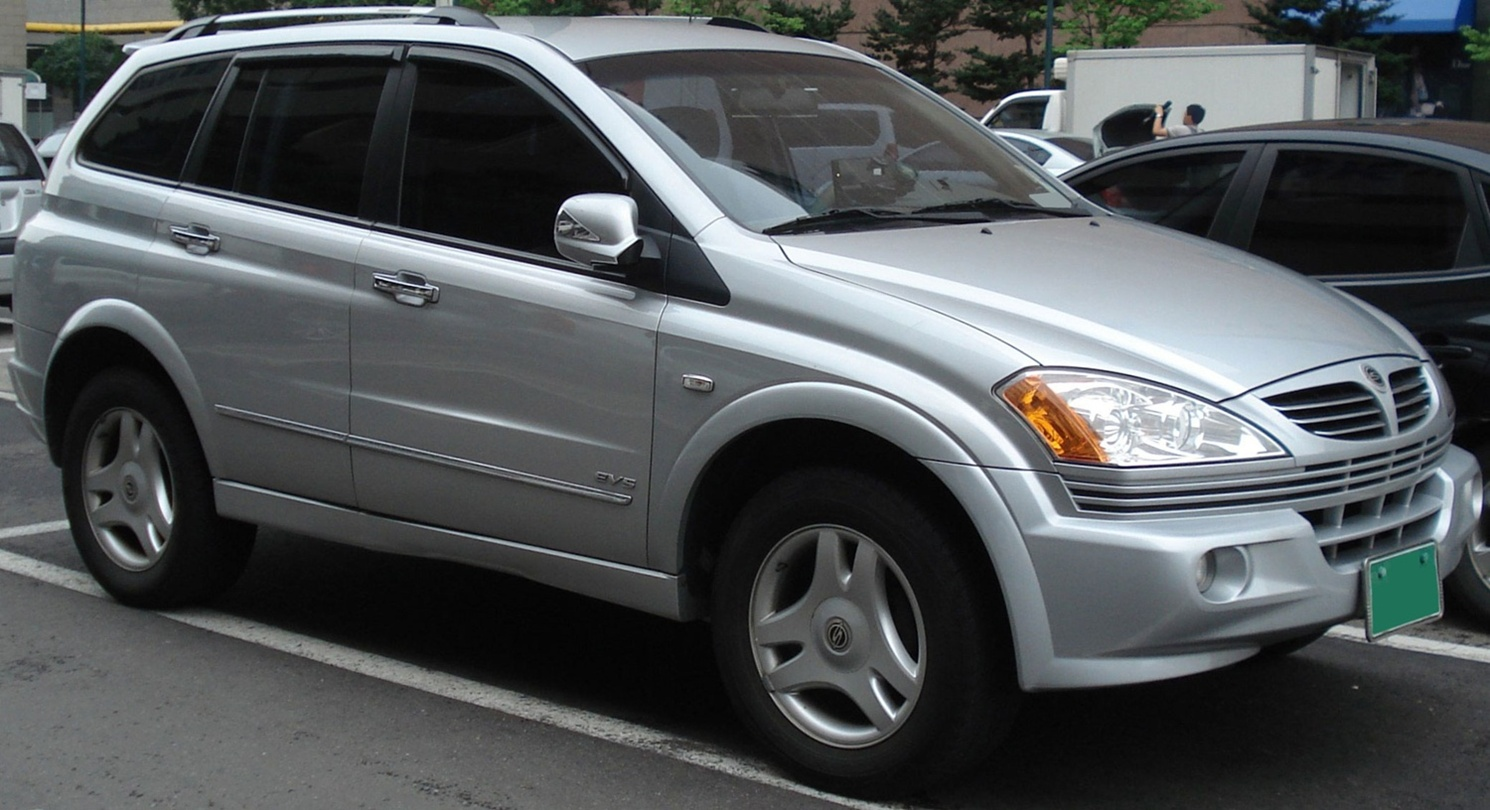
Kyron pre-facelift

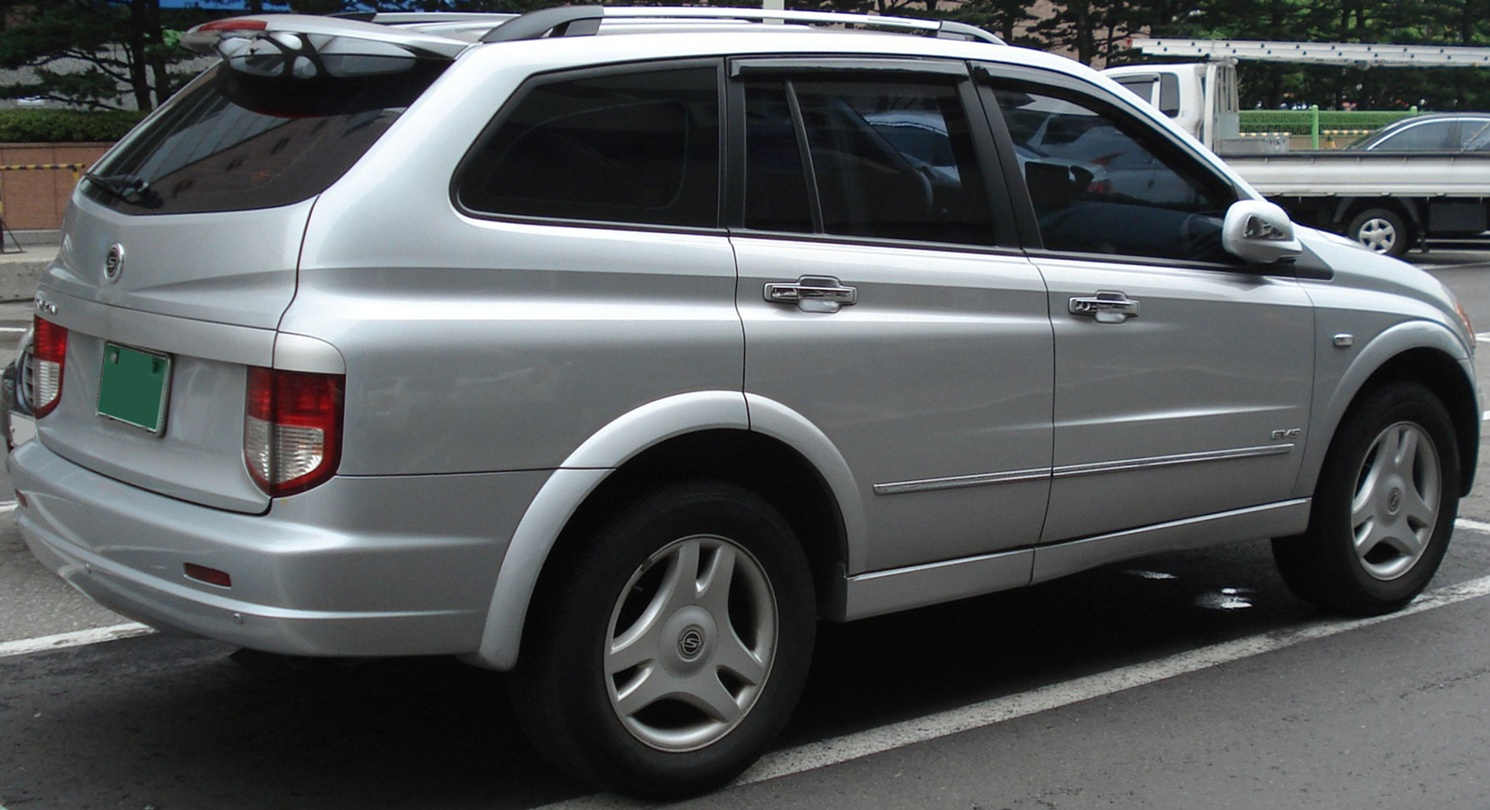
Kyron pre-facelift

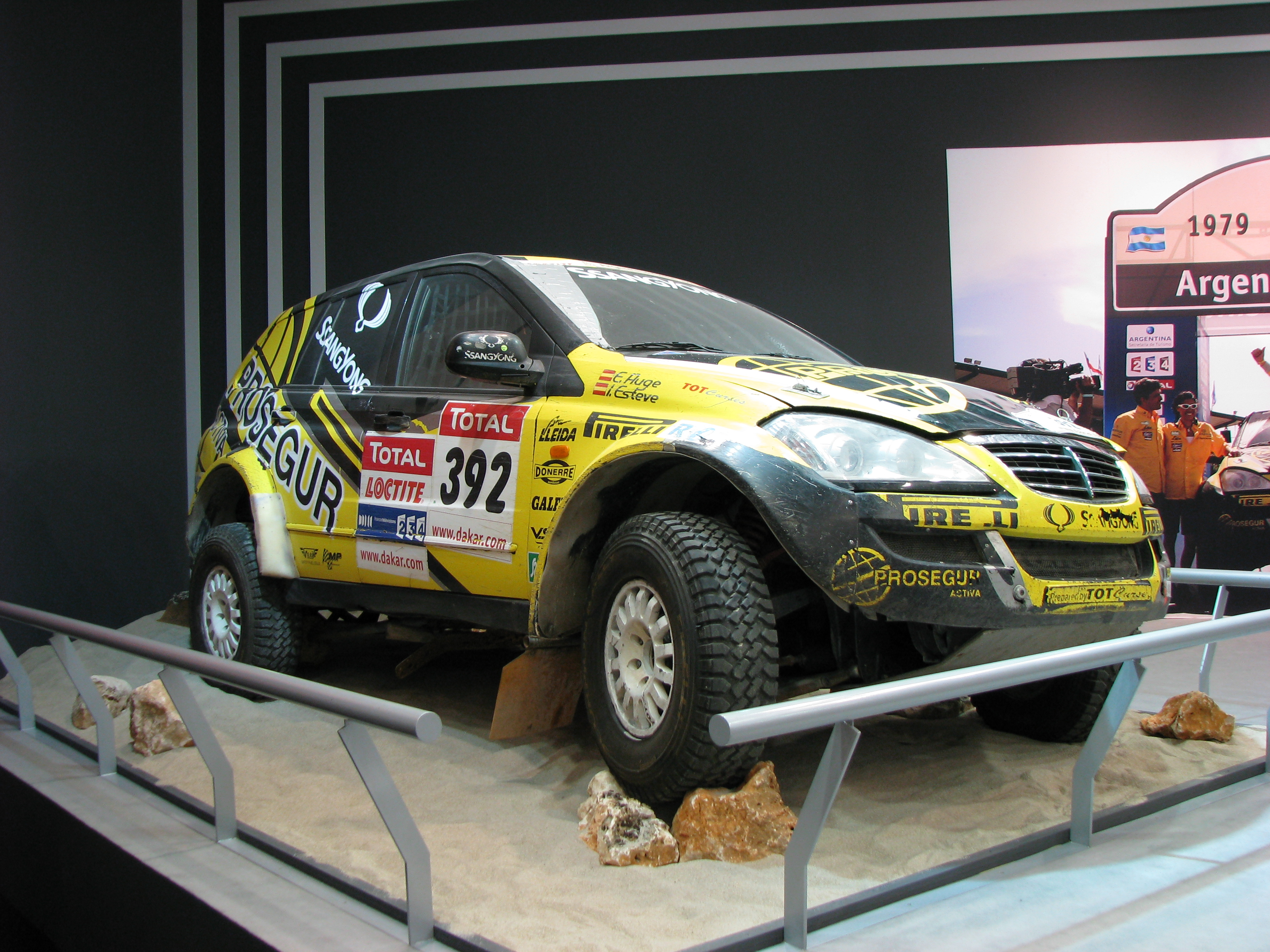
Isidre Esteve Pujol's Kyron Dakar Rally car

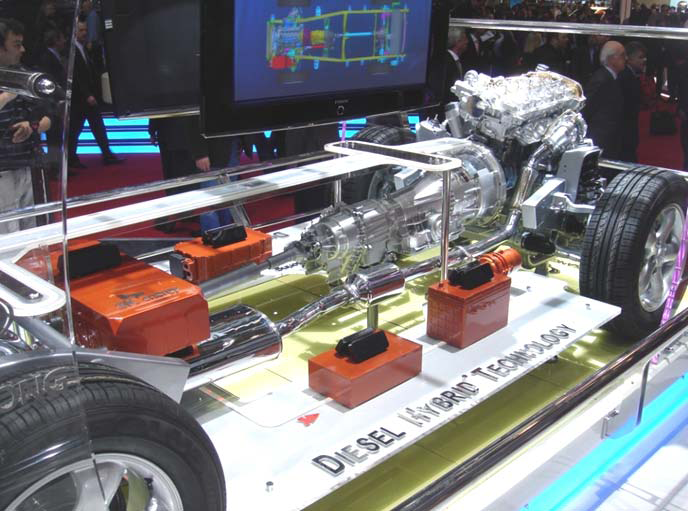
SsangYong hybrid system at the 2008 Geneva Motor Show
