= Mercedes-Benz S-Class (W220) =

Mercedes-Benz S (W220)
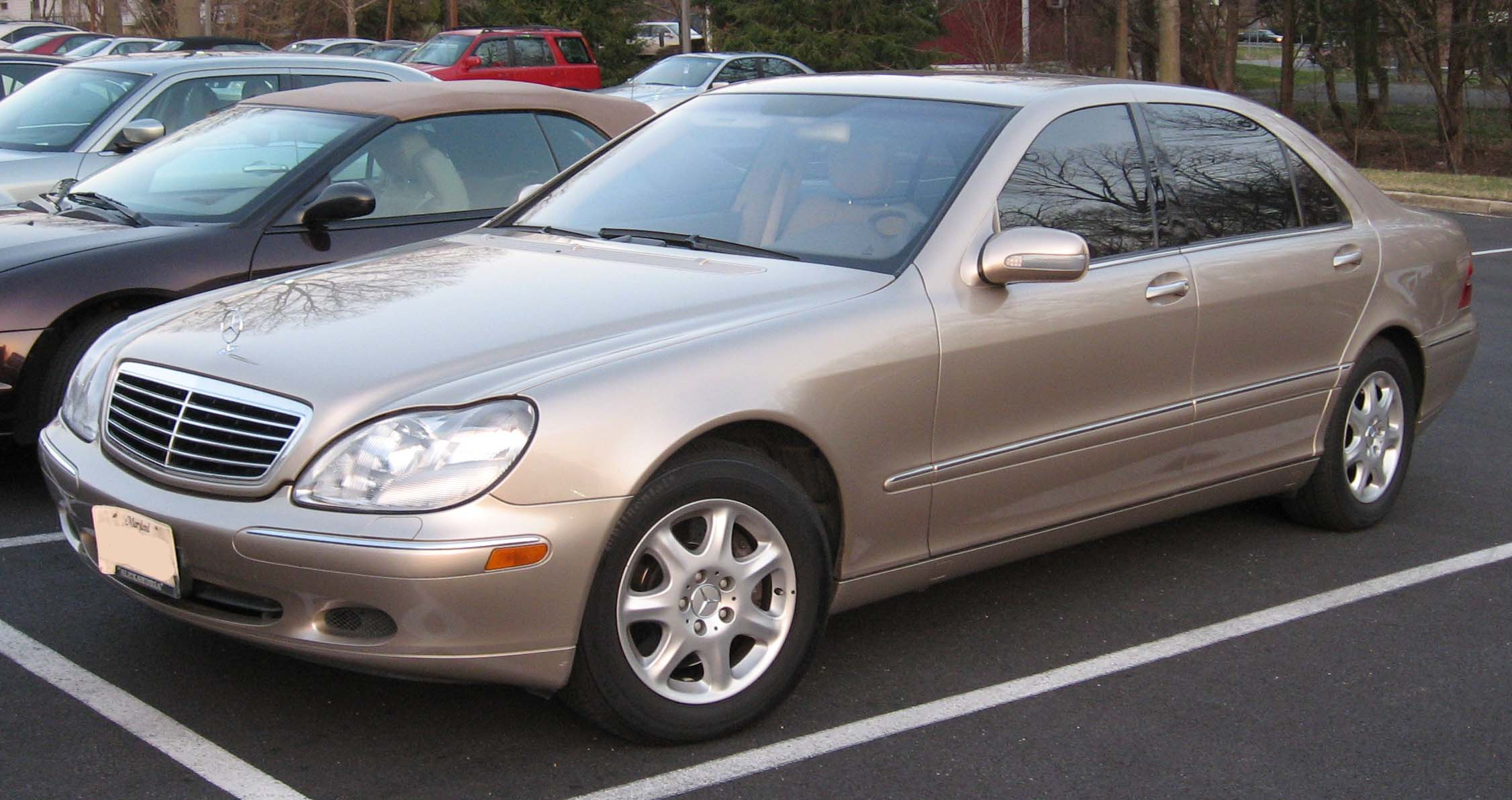

Overview
- Manufacturer: DaimlerChrysler
- Production: September 1998 – July 20, 2005
- Model years: 1999–2005; 2000–2006 (North America)
- Assembly: Germany: Sindelfingen; Mexico: Toluca; Indonesia: Bogor (DaimlerChrysler Indonesia)
- Designer: Steve Mattin, Bruno Sacco (1995)

Body and chassis
- Class: Full-size luxury car (F)
- Body style: 4-door saloon
- Layout: Front engine, rear-wheel drive / four-wheel drive
- Related: Mercedes-Benz CL-Class (C215)

Powertrain
- Engine: Petrol: 2.8–3.7 L M112 V6; 4.3–5.4 L M113 V8; 5.4 L M113 supercharged V8; 5.5–6.0 L M275 twin-turbo V12; 5.8–6.3 L M137 V12; Diesel: 3.2 L OM613 I6; 3.2 L OM648 I6; 4.0 L OM628 V8
- Transmission: 5-speed 5G-Tronic automatic; 7-speed 7G-Tronic automatic

Dimensions
- Wheelbase: 2,960 mm (116.5 in) (SWB); 3,085 mm (121.5 in) (LWB)
- Length: 5,038 mm (198.3 in) (SWB); 5,043 mm (198.5 in) (SWB, 2002–05); 5,158 mm (203.1 in) (LWB); 5,163 mm (203.3 in) (LWB, 2002–05)
- Width: 1,855 mm (73.0 in)
- Height: 1,444 mm (56.9 in)
- Curb weight: 1,770–3,385 kg (3,902–7,463 lb)

Chronology
- Predecessor: Mercedes-Benz S-Class (W140)
- Successor: Mercedes-Benz S-Class (W221)

The Mercedes-Benz W220 is a range of flagship saloons manufactured by Mercedes-Benz and marketed from 1998 to 2005 as the fourth generation Mercedes-Benz S-Class. Replacing the W140 S-Class after the 1998 model year, the W220 offered long and short wheelbase versions, performance and luxury options, available four-wheel drive, and a range of diesel as well as gas/petrol V6, V8, and V12 engines.

Compared to its predecessor, the W220 featured somewhat smaller exterior dimensions combined with greater interior volume, particularly in the long-wheelbase versions, and slightly less cargo volume.

Development began in 1992, with the final design, under the direction of Steve Mattin, approved in June 1995 and frozen in March 1996. The completed prototypes were presented in June 1998.

W220 pre-production (prototype) began in April 1997, with regular/standard production following in September 1998 (for the 1999 model year), and C215 coupé production in 1999. Production of the 220-series totalled 484,683 units, slightly more than the production totals from the W140.

Production ended in July 2005, when the W220 was replaced by the W221 S-Class and the C215 was replaced in 2006 by the C216 CL-Class.

== Styling ==
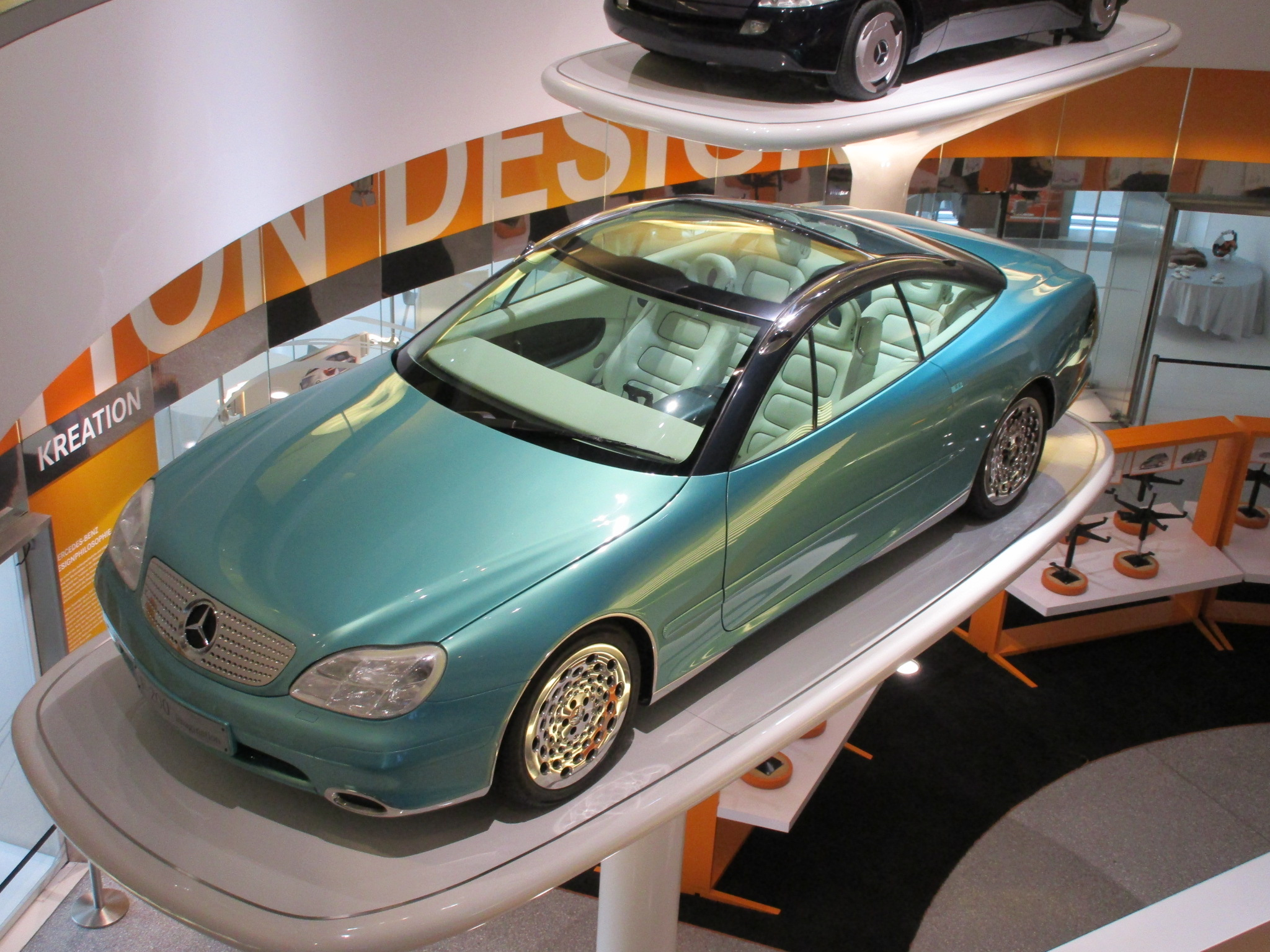
Mercedes-Benz F200 Imagination at the Mercedes-Benz Museum

Steve Mattin's design was the first sketch drawn in October 1992 and developed into 1:1 scale by late 1994. In June 1995, the Daimler-Benz AG board of management approved Mattin's final design at 38 months before production. By March 1996, W220 program engineers completed the design freeze, 29 months before production start in August 1998. The W220's exterior design language (especially the headlights) was previewed by the Mercedes-Benz F200 concept in late 1996. Being a Mercedes flagship vehicle worldwide, the S-Class largely popularized the theme.

A facelifted version of the S-Class was designed in late 2000 and introduced in September 2002, offering a more refined front-end with a larger, more upright grille, transparent headlamp housings with sealed-beam projectors, and revised taillights. Much of the rest of the exterior remained largely unchanged from first phase W220 models.

Inside, the update addressed several of the issues in the COMAND system and other interior features. Exterior updates included a more upright grille angle, new transparent housing for the headlamps (replacing the earlier translucent versions), and restyled lower air intakes on the front bumper.

The V12 powered models feature either a "V12" or "V12 biturbo" badge affixed to both front fenders of the car.

== Models ==
The top speed of most models was electronically limited to 250 km/h (155 mph), if it could be achieved. Some models, such as the S 280, could not reach this speed.

Chassis code	Years*	Model	Engine	Power at rpm	Torque at rpm	Fuel consumption	0–100 km/h (62 mph) (official)
W220.063	1998–2005	S 280	2.8L V6 M112 E28	150 kW (201 hp; 204 PS) at 5,700	270 N⋅m (199 lb⋅ft) at 3,000–5,000	11.1 L/100 km (25.4 mpg_{‑imp}; 21.2 mpg_{‑US})	9.7 seconds
W220.163	2002–2005	S 280 L	2.8L V6 M112 E28	150 kW (201 hp; 204 PS) at 5,700	270 N⋅m (199 lb⋅ft) at 3,000–5,000	11.1 L/100 km (25.4 mpg_{‑imp}; 21.2 mpg_{‑US})	9.7 seconds
W220.065	1998–2002	S 320	3.2L V6 M112 E32	165 kW (221 hp; 224 PS) at 5,600	315 N⋅m (232 lb⋅ft) at 3,000–4,800	11.5 L/100 km (24.6 mpg_{‑imp}; 20.5 mpg_{‑US})	8.2 seconds
W220.165	1998–2002	S 320 L	3.2L V6 M112 E32	165 kW (221 hp; 224 PS) at 5,600	315 N⋅m (232 lb⋅ft) at 3,000–4,800	11.5 L/100 km (24.6 mpg_{‑imp}; 20.5 mpg_{‑US})	8.2 seconds
W220.067	2002–2005	S 350	3.7L V6 M112 E37	180 kW (241 hp; 245 PS) at 5,700	350 N⋅m (258 lb⋅ft) at 3,000–4,500	11.1 L/100 km (25.4 mpg_{‑imp}; 21.2 mpg_{‑US})	7.6 seconds
W220.167	2002–2005	S 350 L	3.7L V6 M112 E37	180 kW (241 hp; 245 PS) at 5,700	350 N⋅m (258 lb⋅ft) at 3,000–4,500	11.1 L/100 km (25.4 mpg_{‑imp}; 21.2 mpg_{‑US})	7.6 seconds
W220.087	2003–2005	S 350 4Matic	3.7L V6 M112 E37	180 kW (241 hp; 245 PS) at 5,700	350 N⋅m (258 lb⋅ft) at 3,000–4,500	11.9 L/100 km (23.7 mpg_{‑imp}; 19.8 mpg_{‑US})	7.9 seconds
W220.187	2003–2005	S 350 L 4Matic	3.7L V6 M112 E37	180 kW (241 hp; 245 PS) at 5,700	350 N⋅m (258 lb⋅ft) at 3,000–4,500	11.9 L/100 km (23.7 mpg_{‑imp}; 19.8 mpg_{‑US})	7.9 seconds
W220.070	1998–2002	S 430	4.3L V8 M113 E43	205 kW (275 hp; 279 PS) at 5,750	400 N⋅m (295 lb⋅ft) at 3,000–4,400	12.3 L/100 km (23.0 mpg_{‑imp}; 19.1 mpg_{‑US})	7.3 seconds
W220.070	2002–2005	S 430	4.3L V8 M113 E43	205 kW (275 hp; 279 PS) at 5,750	400 N⋅m (295 lb⋅ft) at 3,000–4,400	11.5 L/100 km (24.6 mpg_{‑imp}; 20.5 mpg_{‑US})	7.3 seconds
W220.170	1998–2002	S 430 L	4.3L V8 M113 E43	205 kW (275 hp; 279 PS) at 5,750	400 N⋅m (295 lb⋅ft) at 3,000–4,400	12.3 L/100 km (23.0 mpg_{‑imp}; 19.1 mpg_{‑US})	7.3 seconds
W220.170	2002–2005	S 430 L	4.3L V8 M113 E43	205 kW (275 hp; 279 PS) at 5,750	400 N⋅m (295 lb⋅ft) at 3,000–4,400	11.5 L/100 km (24.6 mpg_{‑imp}; 20.5 mpg_{‑US})	7.3 seconds
W220.083	2002–2005	S 430 4Matic	4.3L V8 M113 E43	205 kW (275 hp; 279 PS) at 5,750	400 N⋅m (295 lb⋅ft) at 3,000–4,400	12.5 L/100 km (22.6 mpg_{‑imp}; 18.8 mpg_{‑US})	7.4 seconds
W220.183	2002–2005	S 430 L 4Matic	4.3L V8 M113 E43	205 kW (275 hp; 279 PS) at 5,750	400 N⋅m (295 lb⋅ft) at 3,000–4,400	12.5 L/100 km (22.6 mpg_{‑imp}; 18.8 mpg_{‑US})	7.4 seconds
W220.075	1998–2005	S 500	5.0L V8 M113 E50	225 kW (302 hp; 306 PS) at 5,600	460 N⋅m (339 lb⋅ft) at 2,700–4,250	12.9 L/100 km (21.9 mpg_{‑imp}; 18.2 mpg_{‑US})	6.5 seconds
W220.084	2002–2005	S 500 4Matic	5.0L V8 M113 E50	225 kW (302 hp; 306 PS) at 5,600	460 N⋅m (339 lb⋅ft) at 2,700–4,250	12.9 L/100 km (21.9 mpg_{‑imp}; 18.2 mpg_{‑US})	6.5 seconds
W220.175	1998–2005	S 500 L	5.0L V8 M113 E50	225 kW (302 hp; 306 PS) at 5,600	460 N⋅m (339 lb⋅ft) at 2,700–4,250	12.9 L/100 km (21.9 mpg_{‑imp}; 18.2 mpg_{‑US})	6.5 seconds
W220.184	2002–2005	S 500 L 4Matic	5.0L V8 M113 E50	225 kW (302 hp; 306 PS) at 5,600	460 N⋅m (339 lb⋅ft) at 2,700–4,250	12.9 L/100 km (21.9 mpg_{‑imp}; 18.2 mpg_{‑US})	6.5 seconds
W220.178	1998–2002	S 600 L	5.8L V12 M137	270 kW (362 hp; 367 PS) at 5,500	530 N⋅m (391 lb⋅ft) at 4,250	13.4 L/100 km (21.1 mpg_{‑imp}; 17.6 mpg_{‑US})	6.3 seconds
W220.176	2002–2005	S 600 L	5.5L twin-turbocharged V12 M275	368 kW; 500 PS (493 hp) at 5,000	800 N⋅m (590 lb⋅ft) at 1,800–3,500	14.8 L/100 km (19.1 mpg_{‑imp}; 15.9 mpg_{‑US})	4.8 seconds
W220.075 (220.073 from 08.2000 )	1999–2002	S 55 AMG	5.4L V8 M113 E55	265 kW (360 PS; 355 hp) at 5,500	530 N⋅m (391 lb⋅ft) at 3,150–4,500	13.4 L/100 km (21.1 mpg_{‑imp}; 17.6 mpg_{‑US})	6.0 seconds
W220.173	2000–2002	S 55 L AMG	5.4L V8 M113 E55	265 kW (360 PS; 355 hp) at 5,500	530 N⋅m (391 lb⋅ft) at 3,150–4,500	14.1 L/100 km (20.0 mpg_{‑imp}; 16.7 mpg_{‑US})	5.7 seconds
W220.074	2002–2005	S 55 AMG	5.4L supercharged V8 M113K	350 kW (476 PS; 469 hp) at 6,100	700 N⋅m (516 lb⋅ft) at 2,750–4,000	13.2 L/100 km (21.4 mpg_{‑imp}; 17.8 mpg_{‑US})	4.8 seconds
W220.174	2002–2005	S 55 L AMG	5.4L supercharged V8 M113K	350 kW (476 PS; 469 hp) at 6,100	700 N⋅m (516 lb⋅ft) at 2,750–4,000	13.2 L/100 km (21.4 mpg_{‑imp}; 17.8 mpg_{‑US})	4.8 seconds
W220.178	2001–2002	S 63 L AMG	6.3L V12 M137 E63	326 kW (443 PS; 437 hp) at 5,500	620 N⋅m (457 lb⋅ft) at 4,400	14.1 L/100 km (20.0 mpg_{‑imp}; 16.7 mpg_{‑US})	5.7 seconds
W220.179	2005–2005	S 65 L AMG	6.0L twin-turbocharged V12 M275 AMG	450 kW (612 PS; 604 hp) at 4,800–5,100	1,000 N⋅m (738 lb⋅ft) at 2,000–4,000	14.9 L/100 km (19.0 mpg_{‑imp}; 15.8 mpg_{‑US})	4.4 seconds
W220.026	1999–2002	S 320 CDI	3.2L common rail turbo diesel I6 OM613	145 kW (197 PS; 194 hp) at 4,200	470 N⋅m (347 lb⋅ft) at 1,800–2,600	8.0 L/100 km (35.3 mpg_{‑imp}; 29.4 mpg_{‑US})	8.8 seconds
W220.126	2001–2002	S 320 L CDI	3.2L common rail turbo diesel I6 OM613	145 kW (197 PS; 194 hp) at 4,200	470 N⋅m (347 lb⋅ft) at 1,800–2,600	8.0 L/100 km (35.3 mpg_{‑imp}; 29.4 mpg_{‑US})	8.8 seconds
W220.025	2002–2005	S 320 CDI	3.2L common rail turbo diesel I6 OM648	150 kW (204 PS; 201 hp) at 4,200	500 N⋅m (369 lb⋅ft) at 1,800–2,600	7.7 L/100 km (36.7 mpg_{‑imp}; 30.5 mpg_{‑US})	8.2 seconds
W220.125	2002–2005	S 320 L CDI	3.2L common rail turbo diesel I6 OM648	150 kW (204 PS; 201 hp) at 4,200	500 N⋅m (369 lb⋅ft) at 1,800–2,600	7.7 L/100 km (36.7 mpg_{‑imp}; 30.5 mpg_{‑US})	8.2 seconds
W220.028	2000–2005	S 400 CDI	4.0L common rail turbo diesel V8 OM628	184 kW (250 PS; 247 hp) at 4,000	560 N⋅m (413 lb⋅ft) at 1,800–2,600	9.6 L/100 km (29.4 mpg_{‑imp}; 24.5 mpg_{‑US})	7.8 seconds
W220.128	2000–2005	S 400 L CDI	4.0L common rail turbo diesel V8 OM628	184 kW (250 PS; 247 hp) at 4,000	560 N⋅m (413 lb⋅ft) at 1,800–2,600	9.6 L/100 km (29.4 mpg_{‑imp}; 24.5 mpg_{‑US})	7.8 seconds

*Production years, not model years

European sales (for all versions of S-Class):

Year	1999	2000	2001	2002	2003	2004	2005	2006	Total
Units sold	33,667	31,395	30,609	21,331	18,469	13,795	12,609	24,858	186,733

=== North American models ===
Approximate selection of US models. In the US, model years for the W220 were 2000, 2001, 2002, 2003, 2004, 2005, and 2006 (only some versions). Not all versions were available in all model years.

- S 350 (in the US this was available in 2006 only; had a 3.7L V6 and 5-speed automatic transmission)
- S 430
- S 500
- S 600 (naturally-aspirated or twin-turbocharged V12)
- S 55 AMG (naturally-aspirated or supercharged V8)
- S 65 AMG (twin-turbocharged V12)

Some models had options for Sport Package, Designo, and/or 4Matic.

The W220 S-Class was introduced to the US, its second largest market for the S-Class, in 1999 for the 2000 model year, replacing the W140. In 1999, Mercedes-Benz sold 189,437 and hoped to exceed that the next year.

Early reviews noted the cost options. One automotive magazine spent several thousands on options for their review of the 2001 S-Class, increasing from the base price from the mid US$70,000s to the $90,000s after delivery and taxes.

Other US models available at this time were the S430, S500, S55 (AMG model), and S600 (the V12). A four-wheel drive system became an option for 2003 for the S430 and S500 along with mid-life upgrades that targeted a range of interior and exterior features. In the last U.S. W220 model year, a V-6 was offered as the S350. Special interior, exterior colors and materials were marketed as "Designo" trim, including Espresso Edition and the Silver Edition for the twelve-cylinder S 600 with more leather over its surfaces. The W220 based S65 AMG was also offered in 2006, concurrently with the new W221.

== Specific versions ==
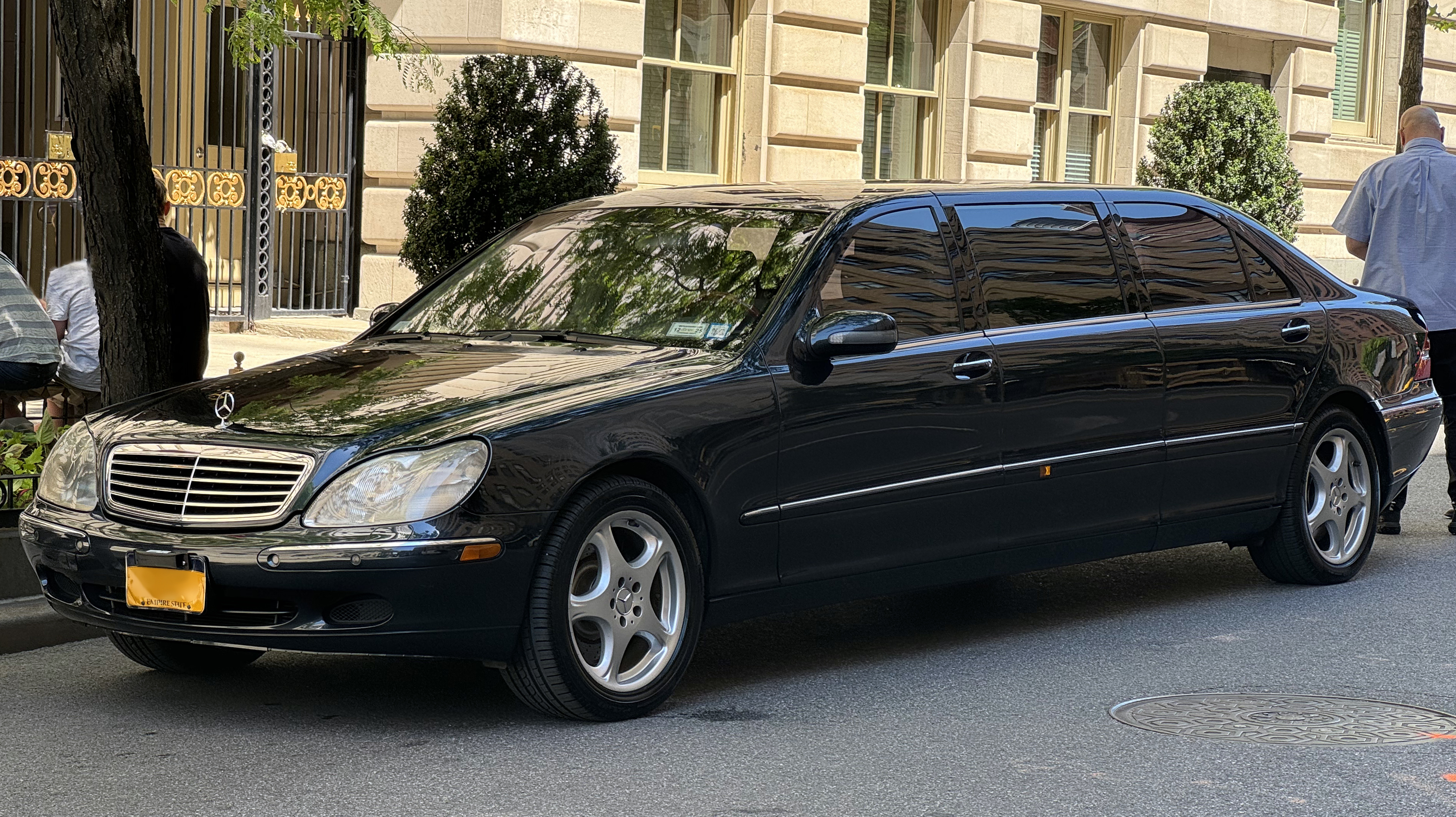
S 500 Pullman

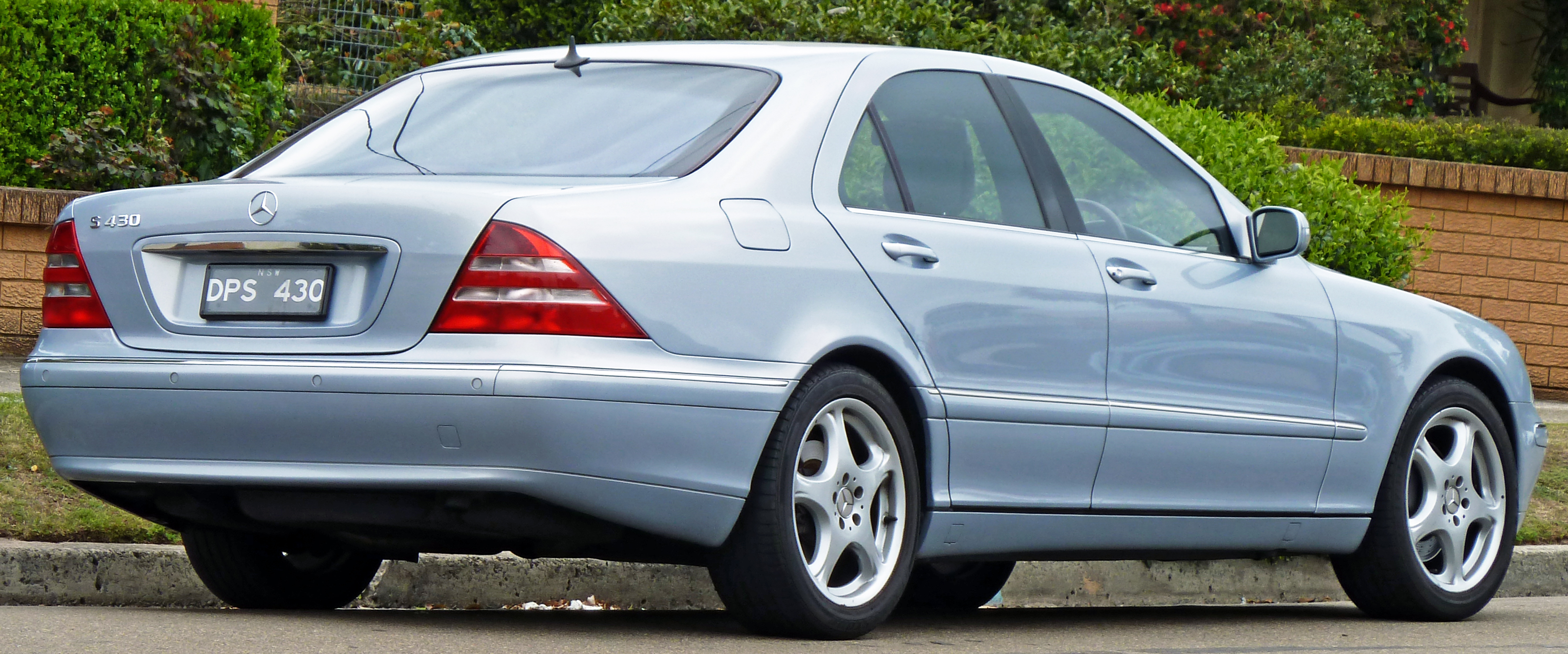
Pre-facelift Mercedes-Benz S 430 (Australia)

One of the most popular versions was the long-wheelbase S 500, with over 108,000 produced over the model run. On top of that, an additional over 13,000 all-wheel drive S 500 version were made and over 21,000 short-wheel base S 500 models. This works out to about 140,000 S 500 of all versions across all model years out of 484,683 of all W220 models over its production run. The W220's peak sales year was 2000, with 88,000 sold worldwide, but both 1999 and 2001 were close with well over 80,000 sold. Two unique models that had small runs were a factory produced 160 inch wheelbase "stretch limo" called a Pullman and a special security version called S-Guard.

The Pullman version was a Mercedes-Benz engineered version of the S-Class of this period (presented in 2000, going on sale in 2001), that went beyond the after market "stretch" to offer a host of advanced systems and enhanced comfort. One of those systems was the AMG Advanced Mobile Media System to support the concept of a mobile office from within the vehicle. Components of this system including 10.4 inch LCD monitors displaying data from a computer with mobile web access. The system could also support video display, both from a DVD player or tuner to pick up broadcast; with two screens, it could display both at the same time. An additional rechargeable battery allowed the system to powered independently for a half-hour with the engine off. The AMG developed media system could connect to the World Wide Web using HSCSD or GPRS at up to 43 kilobits per second.

The AMG Advanced Mobile Media System debuted in 1999 on the Mercedes-Benz S 55 AMG, which was noted for featuring a six-channel digital audio system. The system debuted on S-Class with 2001 Pullman model. AMG signed a cooperation agreement with Daimler-Benz starting 1990, producing special models of MB vehicles and became further integrated in this period starting in 1991 with the foundation of Mercedes-AMG GmbH various changes driven especially by the success of AMG models in MB lines and expansions at Affalterbach, Germany.

The S-Class Pullman was offered as the S 500 (V8) or S 600 (V12) and was jointly developed by Mercedes and AMG. The Pullman is 100 cm (39 in) longer than the regular S-Class, providing 70 cm (28 in) of space in the rear seat area. This also additional seating for up to seven-passengers, with two rear facing seats in between the front and back seats. In six-seat configuration the rear bench seat capable of three is replaced by two independent chairs. In addition to the AMG multi-media system, there is also a bar supporting the consumption of cooled beverages, small tables, and a barrier to the front of the vehicle that. Along with this barrier is an intercom from the rear seat to the driver area to support communication within the vehicle. Mechanically, the roof, exhaust, side-panels and chassis featured changes to support the additional length. A special feature for people working on the car, is that the side panels can be easily removed like doors.

=== S 55 AMG ===
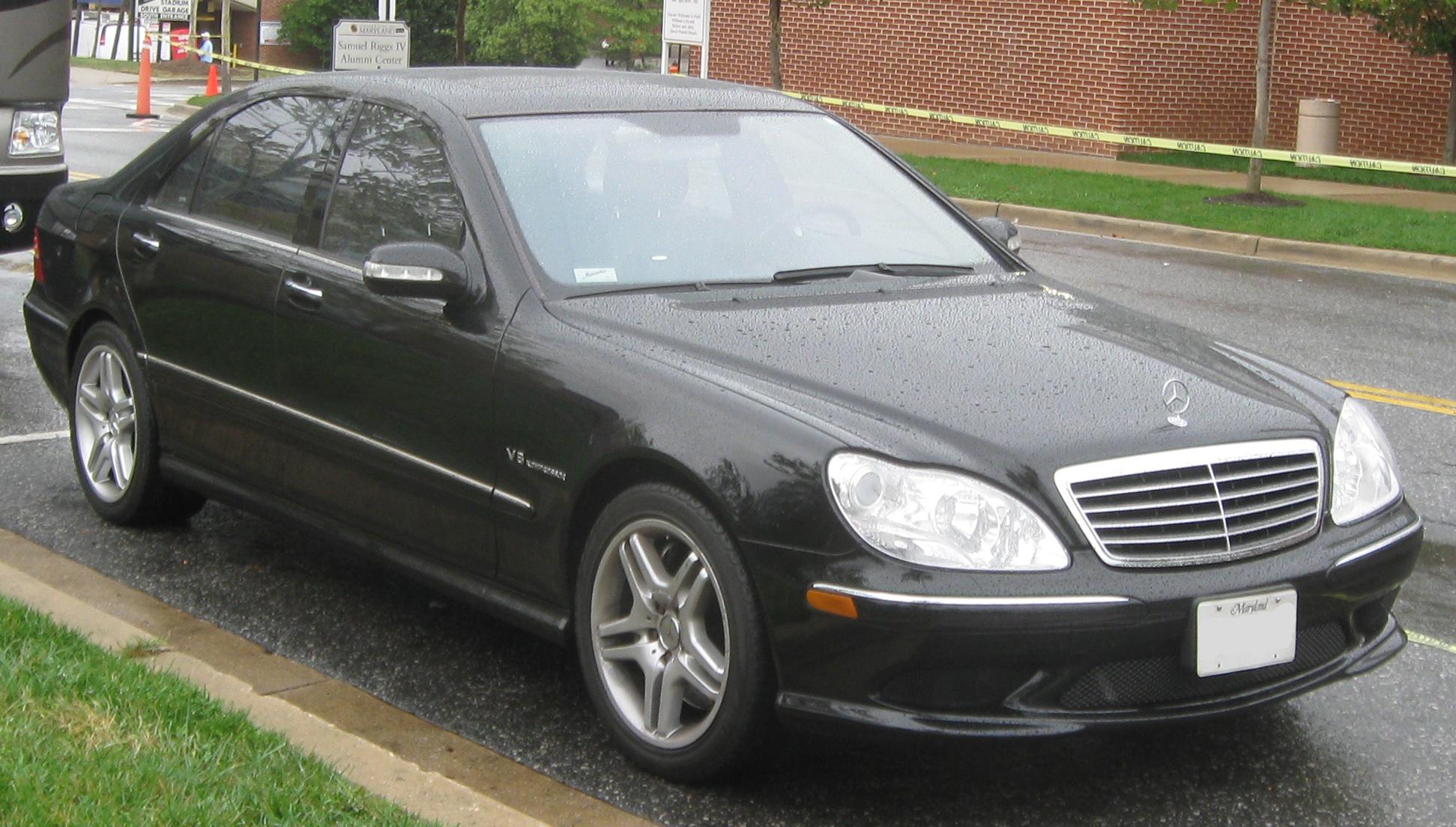
Mercedes-Benz S 55 AMG (US)

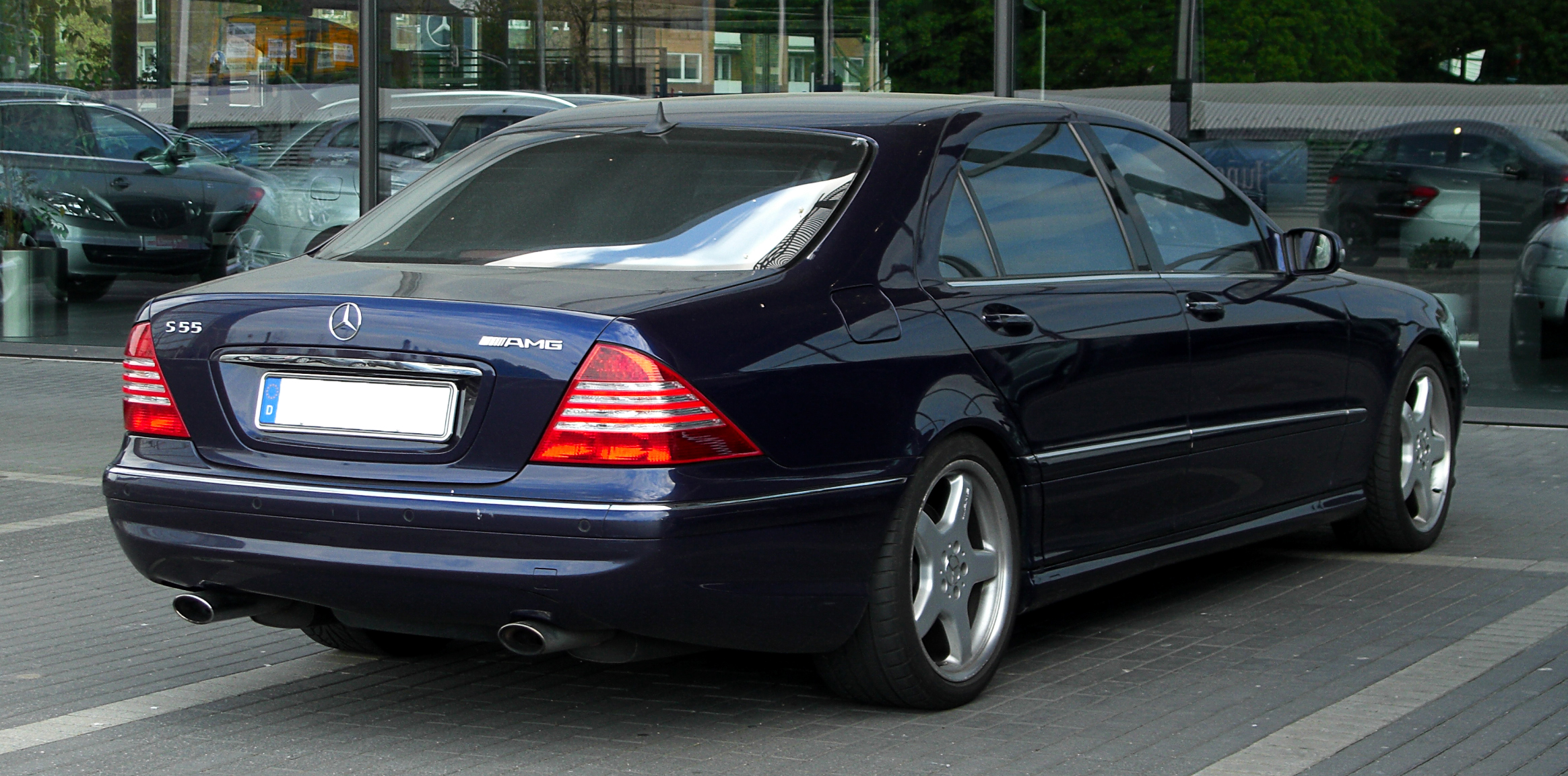
Mercedes-Benz S 55 AMG (Germany)

The S 55 AMG is a high performance version of the S-Class with a number of performance oriented modifications over the stock W220. The model name derives from displacement of the engine, an almost 5.5 litre V8. The early model had a naturally aspirated version of the engine with 355 hp (265 kW; 360 PS), and starting in 2003, it switched to a supercharged version with 493 hp (368 kW; 500 PS) and 516 lb⋅ft (700 N⋅m) of torque.

Other changes include enhanced brakes and wheels, with 14.2 inch brake discs at the front and 13 inch discs at the rear. The S 55 could also be equipped with Active Body Control, but this was not standard. The supercharged S 55 models had the Kompressor (Mercedes-Benz) badge on the side. For more about AMG models with this engine, see "55" 5.4 L V8 Kompressor.

Features added to the S 55 (US-spec):

- Active Body Control (ABC)
  - Automatic Level Control
  - Sport Mode
- 18-inch AMG alloy wheels with performance tires
- AMG body kit including a new AMG front spoiler and rocker panels
- 6-disk capacity CD player mounted in trunk
- Ventilated seats with automatic massage
- Bigger brakes

=== S 600 ===
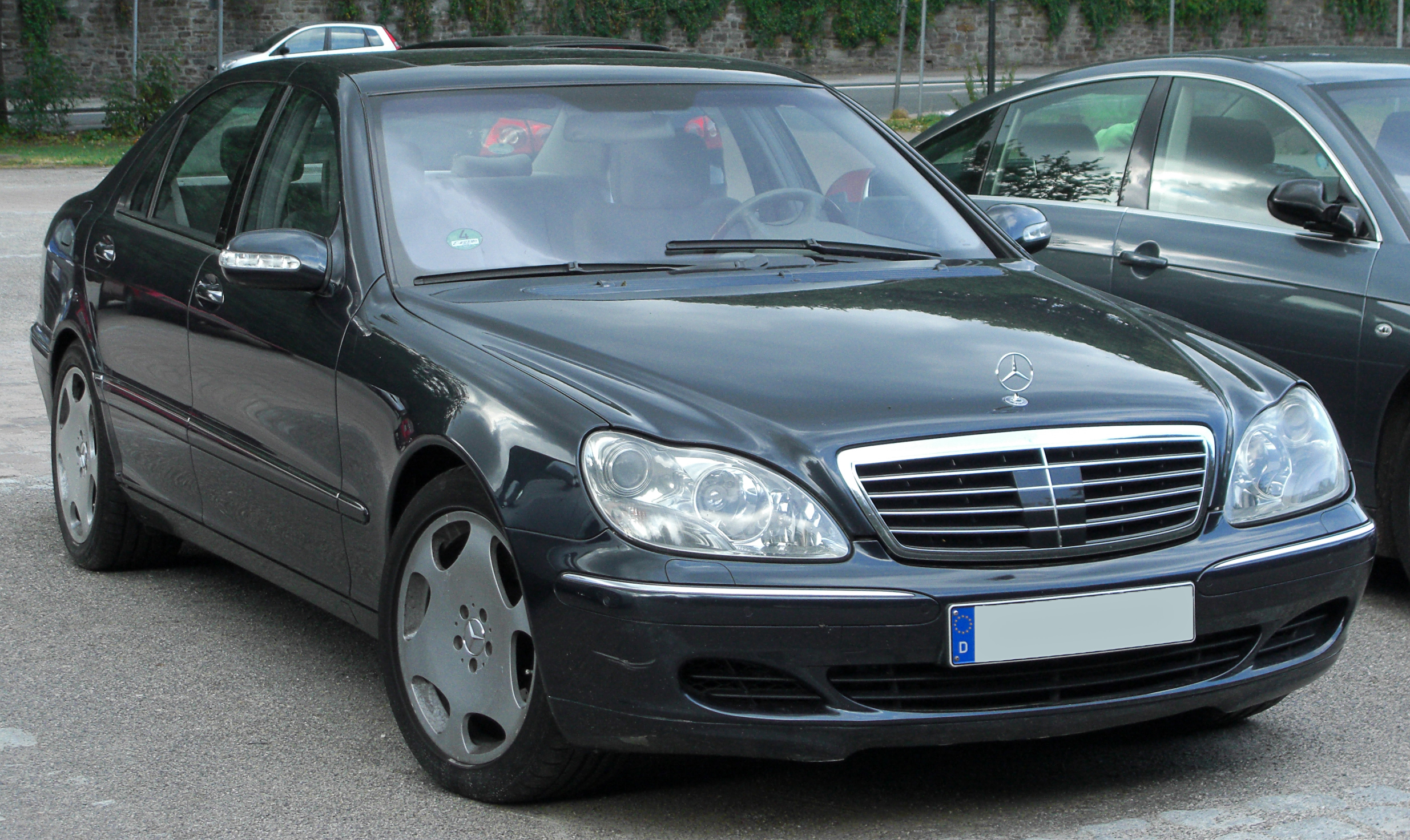

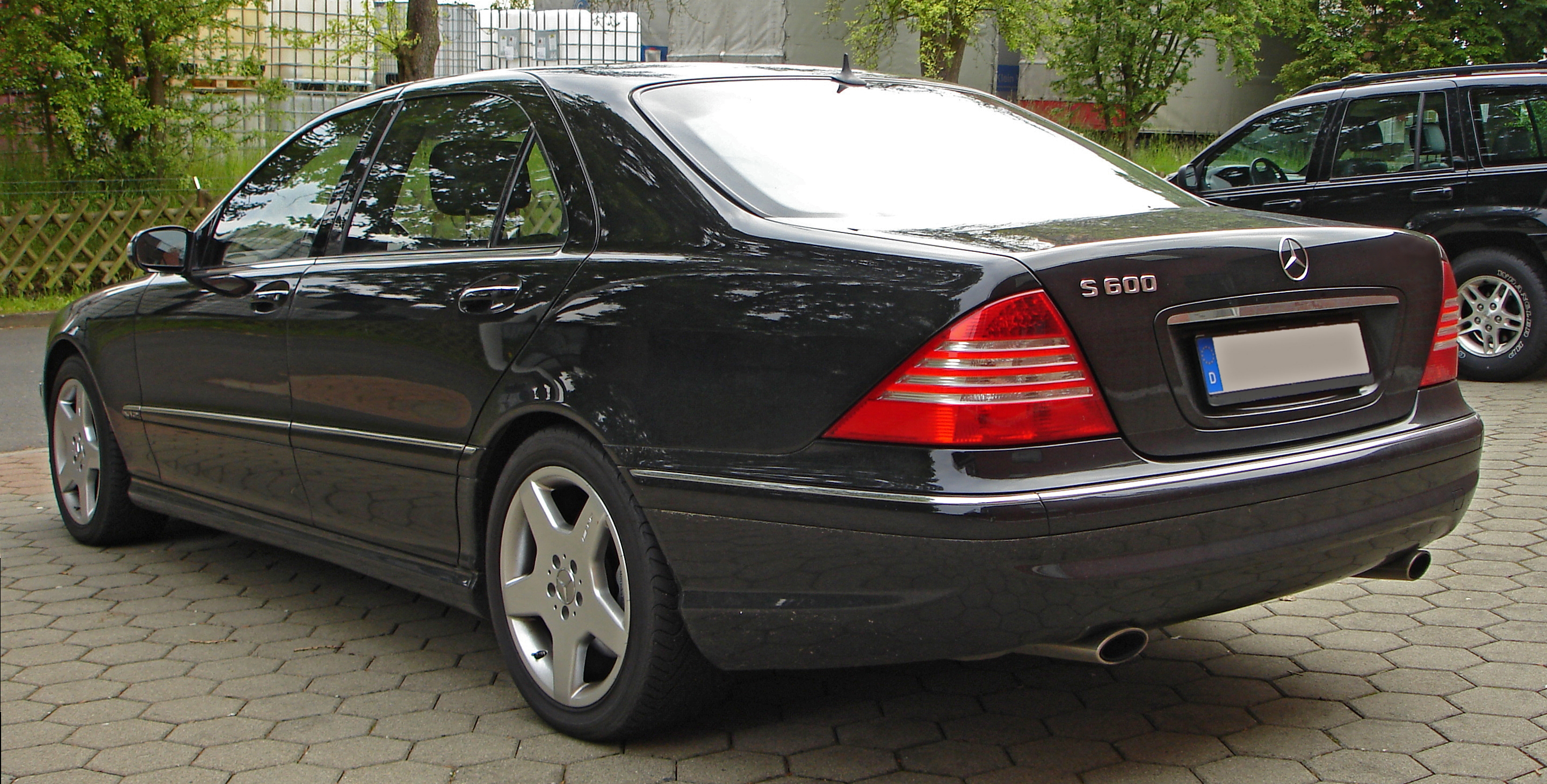
Mercedes-Benz S 600

The S 600 was the main 12-cylinder engine model of the W220. The 2003 S 600 could accelerate from 0-60 mph (97 km/h) in 4.3 seconds and 100 mph (161 km/h) in 9.7 seconds. According to Car and Driver, this meant it could keep up with a Ferrari 575M Maranello in a drag race, being 1/10 second faster than the Ferrari in a quarter mile test, with the S 600 achieving it in 12.5 seconds at 115 mph (185 km/h). It could stop from 70 mph (110 km/h) in 164 feet with the OEM tires in that same testing. The 2003 model was fitted with Michelin Pilot Sport tires with a Y rating. In the US, the 2001 S 600 had a 5.8 liter V-12 making 362 hp (270 kW; 367 PS) at 5500 rpm and up to 391 lb⋅ft (530 N⋅m) of torque at 4100 rpm. The 2003 model update had a 5.5 liter V-12 with twin turbochargers, producing 493 hp (368 kW; 500 PS) and 590 lb⋅ft (800 N⋅m) of torque.

The S 600 was also a model of the S-Class Pullman, an even longer wheelbase version that was 1 meter longer and supporting up to seven passengers and mobile office technology.

A limited run of S 600L facelift sedans were produced featuring the same suite of options as the S-Class Pullman coupled with AMG body styling and AMG alloy wheels.

Features included on the S 600 (US-spec):

- Stitched leather and increased leather trim
  - Leather dashboard
  - Leather tray
  - Leather console
  - Leather doors
- Wood shift knob
- Wood and leather trim on steering wheel
- Alcantara headliner
- Four seats with heat and power operation
- Four-zone climate control
- Parktronic System

=== S 63 AMG ===
For one month in 2001, AMG produced the S 63 AMG, which was sold in very limited numbers. The S 63 was powered by a naturally aspirated 6.3-liter V12 producing 444 PS (327 kW; 438 hp) and 620 N⋅m (457 lb⋅ft) of torque, allowing it to accelerate from 0-100 km/h (62 mph) in a claimed 5.7 seconds. It was only offered with a long wheelbase and with rear-wheel drive. A total of 70 cars, including at least one Pullman limousine, were sold exclusively through AMG in European and Asian markets.

=== S 65 AMG ===
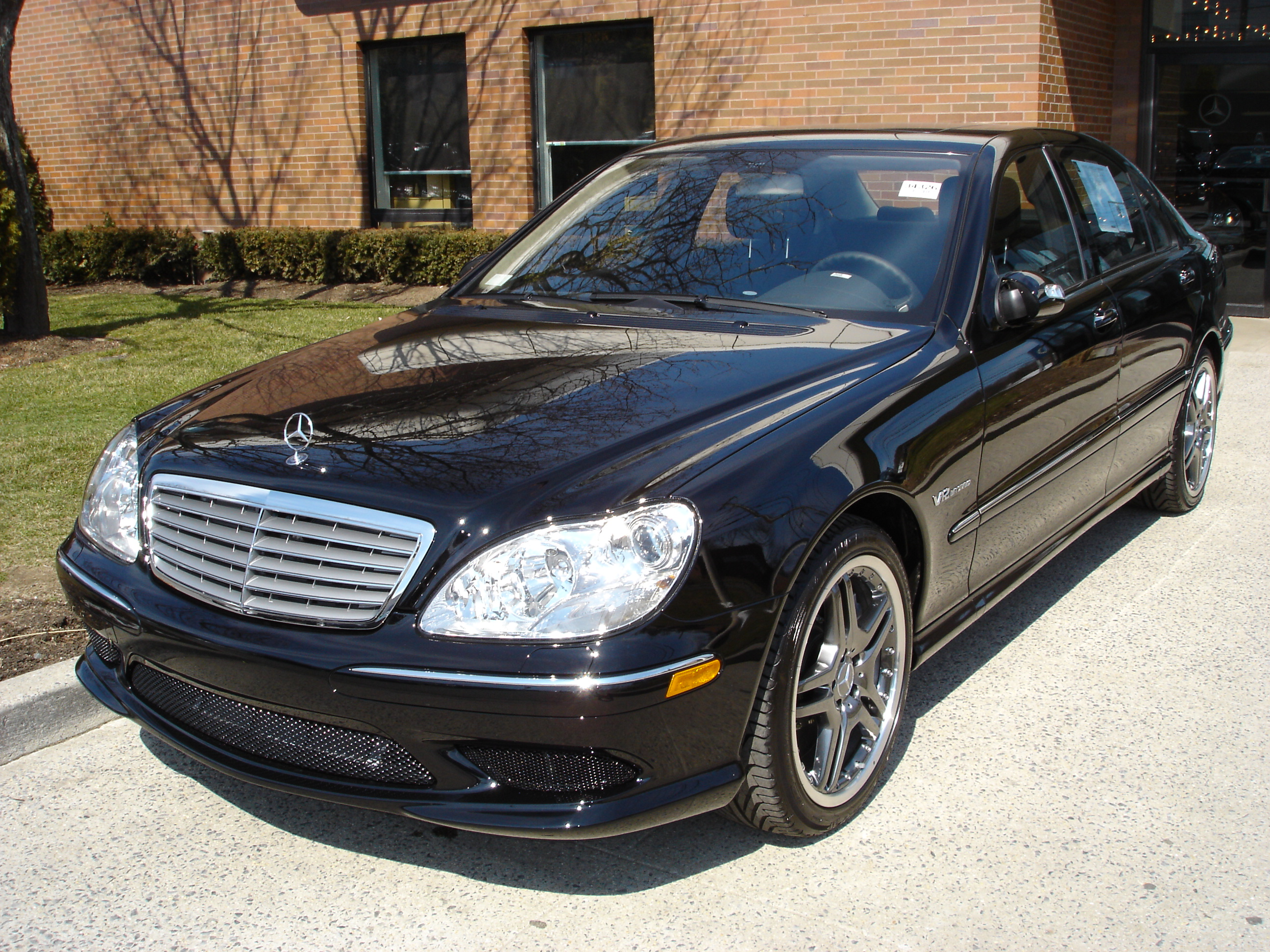

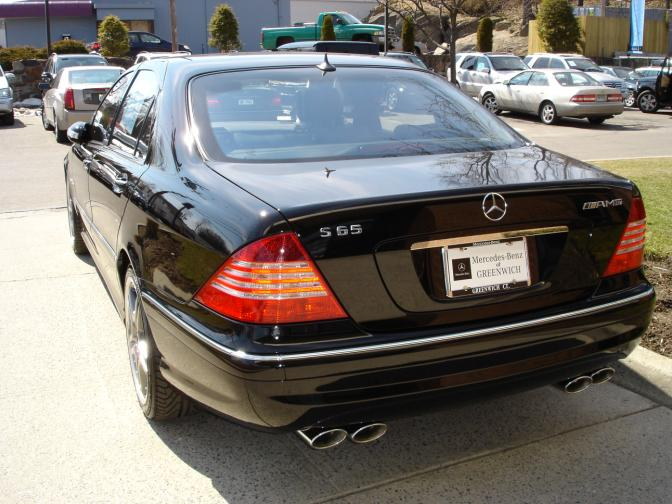
Mercedes-Benz S65 AMG

The S 65 is an AMG version of the S 600, with a twin-turbocharged V12 producing 450 kW (612 PS; 604 hp) and 1,000 N⋅m (738 lb⋅ft) of torque. According to AMG, the engine originally produced 1,200 N⋅m (885 lb⋅ft), but had to be electronically limited, likely because the drivetrain could not handle that much torque. The S 65 still used the 5G-Tronic 5-speed torque converter automatic transmission, instead of the newly introduced 7-speed 7G-Tronic, due to Mercedes having not yet developed a reinforced version of the 7G which could handle the torque of the S 65. The S 65 was only offered with a long wheelbase, and has a curb weight of 2,220 kg (4,894 lb). One reviewer noted that it excelled at being a gran turismo (grand tourer) and averaged about 17 miles per gallon despite its size and equally large power plant.

A popular aftermarket tuning kit was an ECU upgrade from Renntech, since increased engine output could be achieved with no mechanical upgrades to the car.

== Engines ==
The W220 was available with more engine options than the W126 or W140. The range started with a smaller 2.8L 201 hp (150 kW) V6 motor. Very popular was the 3.2L 224 hp (167 kW) V6, which was superseded by an enlarged 3.7L 245 hp (183 kW) V6 in the S 350. Despite their popularity, the 6-cylinder S-Class cars were not imported into countries such as the United States until model year 2006 with the S 350 (short wheelbase), where Daimler was then testing the market demand for a V6 S-Class.

The S 430, the only United States market S-Class available with both a short wheelbase ('03-'06) as well as a long wheelbase, was that region's most popular model and powered by a 4.3L 279 hp (208 kW) V8 that avoided the federal government's Gas Guzzler Tax of $1000. The S 500 was powered by a 5.0L 302 hp (225 kW) V8.

The S 55 AMG (2001–2002) was outfitted with a 5.4L 354 hp (264 kW) V8 motor while the later versions (2003–2006) sported the same motor, but supercharged to a rated 493 hp (368 kW). The S 600 (2001–02) was outfitted with a 5.8L 362 hp (270 kW) V12 engine while the later versions (2003–06) sported a twin-turbocharged (or Bi-Turbo) 493 hp (368 kW) 5.5L V12. Both S 55 AMG and S 600 have same engine output but target different clientele: the former more sporty and responsive while the latter more luxurious with a smoother ride.

S 65 AMG was introduced in 2005 with new enlarged 6-litre V12 engine developed specifically for Maybach 57S and 62S (as to amortise the cost of engine development). The twin turbocharged 6-litre V12 had output of 612 hp (456 kW) and 738 lb⋅ft (1,001 N⋅m) of torque. S 65 AMG became the most powerful S-Class ever built with incremental power increase for W222 S 65 AMG in 2017. Additionally, S 65 AMG was world's most powerful five-passenger four-door sedan until Dodge Charger SRT Hellcat with 707 hp (527 kW) was introduced in 2014.

The S 320 CDI was initially fitted with a 197 PS (145 kW) || 470 N⋅m (347 lb⋅ft) engine, which was upgraded in late 2002 to a 204 PS (150 kW) || 500 N⋅m (369 lb⋅ft) one. The S 400 CDI had 250 hp (186 kW) at first, but got 260 hp (194 kW) in 2003. The type designation S 400 CDI was changed in the W221 generation to S 420.

The W220 was the first generation of S-Class where automatic transmissions were standard on all models. At first, all cars had a 5-speed 5G-Tronic transmission; however, since 2003 (2004 in the United States), S 430 and S 500 were instead offered with the new 7-speed 7G-Tronic transmission.

== Transmissions ==
All model years used a 5-speed 5G-Tronic automatic transmission until the 7-speed 7G-Tronic automatic came out. In the U.S. market, the 7 speed was the standard transmission on RWD S 430 and S 500 models from 2004, and 4MATIC models kept the 5-speed. V12 models continued using the 5-speed as the 7-speed could not handle the amount of torque from the V12. The transmission had W and S modes that could be selected.

== Features ==
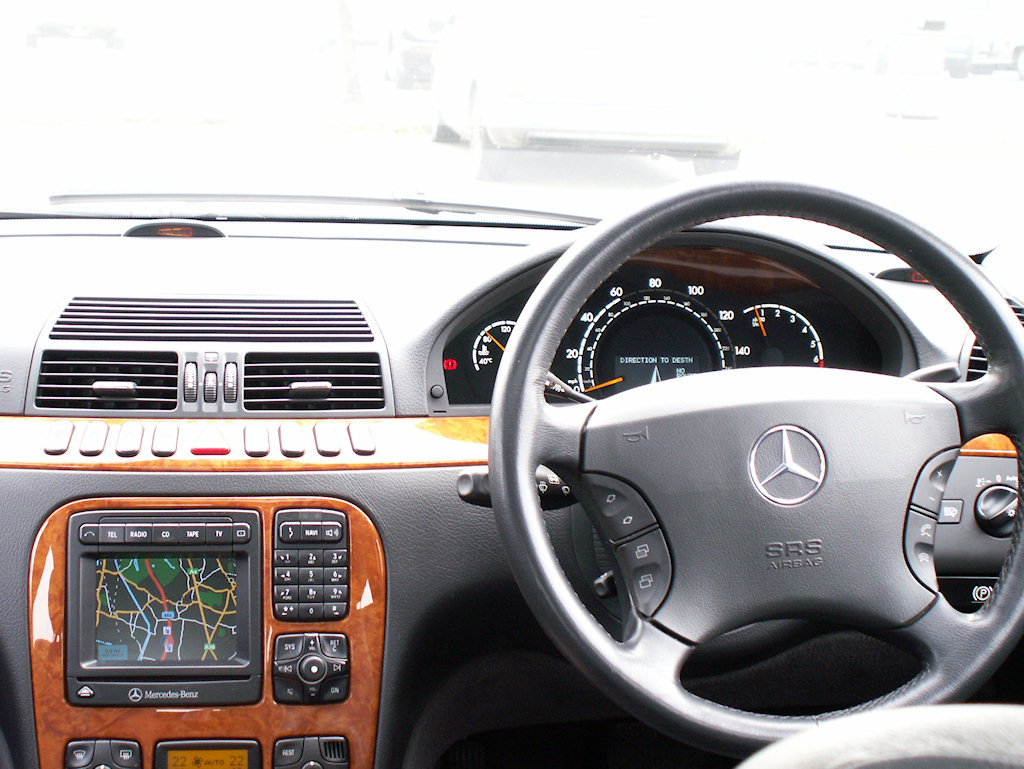
Interview showing the COMAND interface and screen (pre facelifted Interior)

As with each new S-Class, the W220 was considered technologically advanced at the time of its launch, bringing in new innovations such as Airmatic air suspension, Active Ventilated Seats (which used miniature fans in the seats to move air through perforations), keyless entry and ignition, Distronic: the first worldwide radar-assisted Autonomous cruise control system, and a cylinder deactivation system called Active Cylinder Control for the S 500 and S 600 models, which improves fuel consumption and reduces emissions. All were pioneering innovations at the time of the W220's conception. There are standard features to all models, standard features to certain models, and finally optional features. Sometimes what is standard changes on a model year or country of sale.

4Matic all wheel drive was introduced to the North American S-Class for 2003, for the S 430 and S 500 as a US$2180 option. This full-time system splits engine power 40/60 front/rear, with electronic traction control adjusting that mix to the wheels (or wheel) with the best traction in slippery conditions.

It was the first Mercedes with curtain airbags (previewed by the F200 concept in 1996).

=== Safety ===
Despite a wide range of safety technology, and being marketed for its safety, one Canadian website said W220 S-Class had not actually been tested by the Insurance Institute for Highway Safety, the National Highway Traffic Safety Administration, or Euro NCAP, or at least the information was not available. However, another website says that the W220 passed the legally prescribed EU front and side impact tests. Increased attention to side impacts was noted, and the car included a window air bag that inflates between the A and C pillars.

Passive safety features include various frames and bulkheads made out of aluminum and/or high-strength steel. Also the front and rear ends include aluminum crash boxes can be replaced as separate units to reduce the cost of repairs. Despite its price German insurance companies put it in the lower bracket because it was easier to repair.

- Pre-Safe, the integrated Mercedes-Benz collision avoidance and response system, debuted with the W220 S-Class facelift in late 2002.
- Electronic Stability Program (ESP) and Brake Assist were standard features for difficult driving conditions and emergency maneuvers.
- The W220 S-Class added standard front and rear side curtain airbags. In total, the W220 features 8 airbags: 2 frontal (driver and passenger), 4 side airbags (one in each door) and 2 window-airbags.
- LED brake lights were also standard issue on the W220. LED brake lights illuminate faster than conventional bulbs.

=== Comfort and convenience ===
Features varied depending on locality (e.g. North American version) and what options were equipped

- Distronic cruise control, which could maintain a set distance between the S-Class and any vehicle in front.
- Speedtronic adjustable speed limiter for not exceeding a set speed on roads with speed limits.
- Optional Keyless Go, a smart key entry and startup system.
- Rain-sensing windshield wipers.
- Light sensors to turn the headlights on and off automatically, depending on lighting circumstances. The instrument display and the COMAND screen's backlight and colour also adjust automatically depending on the ambient light situation.
- Parktronic visual and audible parking aid, with sensors in the front and rear bumpers. Also, the passenger side mirror can swivel down automatically when engaging reverse, to help see the curb.
- Automatically heated exterior mirrors.
- Fully automatic climate control system with pollen and charcoal filters and optional separate rear-seat climate controls. The system features a sensor that is able to detect the sun's position. This allows for individually variable system adjustments based where the sun's rays are most intense.
- COMAND system combines the controls for audio systems, the television, the navigation and the telephone. COMAND based cars offer higher quality audio compared to the Audio 10 system.
- Optional BOSE sound system.
- Summer Open/Close - Ability to open and close all four windows and the sunroof at the same time upon entry and/or exit from the vehicle.
- Self opening and closing trunk.
- Self-closing doors via pneumatic system.
- Electrically adjustable seats are standard. Optional were the memory function for the seats (standard in many countries on the larger engine models) and the multi-contour backrests with massage function.
- Easy entry/exit function.
- Auto-dimming interior and driver's side exterior rear view mirrors to prevent being dazzled by cars behind.
- Xenon headlamps (bi-xenons starting from late 2002 facelift. These provide HID xenon lighting for both low and high beams).
- Linguatronic voice recognition system which can be used to control the audio system, navigation system, and a cellular telephone through voice commands.

The Linguatronic voice control was introduced as an option in 1996 on the W140 S-Class. At that time it was primarily for controlling the car phone, and could understand 30 words. The second generation of this system was introduced in 2000. On the W220 this second generation system could understand more words and control more systems, such as the radio. In 2000, it could understand 300 words and control certain features on the phone, radio, CD player, and other systems. The second generation system needed 20 times the memory of the first generation system (from about half megabyte to twenty megabytes). The algorithms used in the system were developed at Ulm, Germany where what was then called DaimlerChrysler Research and Technology center was located in addition to other groups within the company. The system listens to the person's voice and records frequencies which are then analyzed by a computer and its software. The system looks for patterns called phonemes to understand what the person is saying, a process which it computes in milliseconds.

What system the voice command can control can depend on the model year. In 2000, it could control the car phone, the radio, and the CD player (if installed) but in 2002 the navigation system was also added to its domain. An original goal of the Linguatronic system was to allow essentially hands-free control of interior systems, especially the car phone by using spoken words. This means there is microphone (located in the W220 S-Class) that can listen to the person; one of the issues is hearing the person over background noises and echos. The Linguatronic system used digital pre-processing to support this task. The features is run from hardware in a separate box in the back of the car.

=== Suspension ===
The W220 was available either with air suspension, which is a semi-active/adaptive suspension, or hydropneumatic suspension, which is an active suspension, rather than the more common mechanical "springs and shocks" on most passenger vehicles. The car had an electronic stability control program and automatic slip control.

==== Airmatic ====
Airmatic, or AIRMATIC stands for Adaptive Intelligent Ride Control and was not just an air suspension, but also an electronic and software control system that actively adjusts the level of dampening. The Airmatic air system has an Adaptive Damping System (ADS) which adjusts the shock absorbers to difficult road conditions. This allows, for example, the car to automatically lower itself down at high speeds and keep the car balanced despite loads inside the car. The car can also be manually controlled to raise the car up if going, for example, over rough roads. Drivers can select a comfort or two sports suspension programmes, as well as increase the ride height (+25 mm) using switches on the dash. The increased ride height is automatically canceled after 5 minutes of 55 mph driving or manually through driver's input. The standard W220s have Airmatic. The Airmatic main components are an air-pump, airlines going to each wheel, and four air-struts. The air pump is located in the front diver side behind a splash guard near the wheel. Mercedes-Benz has also improved and changed the Airmatic pump over the course of time. The AIRMATIC struts are controlled by the N51 Air Suspension Control Unit (N51) and there is also a level sensor that tells the level. Airmatic allows a W220 to be lowered or raised by about 2 cm, for example, it lowers at high speeds for a lower center of gravity. The Airmatic system was supported by the ADS, active damping system.

The lower control arm in the previous S-Class was switched to a spring link and torque strut.

On the instrument cluster multi-function display, the AIRMATIC warning message says "AIRMATIC", "VISIT WORKSHOP!" with an graphic of a car with a little arrow pointing up when it may have issues.

==== Active Body Control ====
Some models had a hydropneumatic suspension system, Active Body Control or ABC. The ABC system on the 1998-2005 S-Class used hydropneumatic suspension struts.

The electronically controlled hydropneumatic Active Body Control (ABC) system is technically more advanced than Airmatic and keeps the car level even in fast corners, as well as providing a comfort and sports setting. Also, just like Airmatic equipped vehicles, the ride height can be raised by using a button (2 settings, compared with Airmatic's single setting), increasing ground clearance for driving on difficult terrain such as roads with deep ruts or snow. Prior to September 2002, only higher end models (e.g. S 600, which only was available with ABC) lowered themselves automatically at higher speeds by 15 mm in order to achieve greater stability (lower center of gravity) as well as better fuel efficiency through a slightly improved aerodynamic drag coefficient. As of September 2002, all models, regardless of engine and drivetrain type (ABC or Airmatic), were able to do so as well. Furthermore, at highway speeds, the suspension computer automatically engages sport mode (Airmatic - Sport mode 1 or 2 depending on the current speed), thus aiding safety by reducing body roll in sharp turns.

ABC was standard on the S 55 AMG (supercharged), S 600 (biturbo), and S 65 AMG (biturbo), while being an optional upgrade on other S-Class models. The ABC system consists of several key components including a high-pressure hydraulic pump, hydraulic struts with electronic sensors, pressure accumulators, a pulsation damper, valve blocks, and a hydraulic fluid reservoir with filter. The system operates at pressures exceeding 200 bar. Regular maintenance includes hydraulic fluid and filter replacement every two years or 20,000 km. Common failure points include deterioration of hydraulic lines after approximately 10 years, pump wear from low fluid levels, and pulsation damper failure — identifiable by a humming noise peaking at around 2,000 rpm.

=== Variation in features ===
There was a set of standard features, then differences between models other than just the engine, and then also various options that could be added to any given model.

The basic model had Calyptus wood (possibly Eucalyptus), the S 500 added burl walnut trim Walnut tree, the Designo Espresso edition had Elm wood trim, and the Designo Silver edition had Maple wood trim.

- Major features: 5G-Tronic transmission, Airmatic Air Suspension with Adaptive Damping System (ADS), Electronic Stability Program (ESP), Automatic Slip Control (ASR), Leather Upholstery, 14 Way Power Driver and Front Passenger Seats, each with 3 Position Memory, 4-way (tilt/telescoping) power steering column, Dual Zone Climate Control (for driver and front passenger) but also separate vents for rear passengers, Hand-polished Calyptus wood trim on dash, console, doors and shift gate, COMAND data system (integrates audio, phone, navigation control), Bose AM/FM stereo/weatherband radio, concealed autoreverse cassette player, and controls for CD changer and phone with a color-LCD in-dash screen, CD navigation system (integrated with COMAND), TeleAid telecommunications service, Pneumatic door and trunk closing assist (this does not close from fully open), headlamp high pressure washers, power retractable mirrors, Front and rear ventilated disc brakes
  - The S 500, besides switching the engine added Nappa leather, a heated front seat, walnut wood trim, and Xenon high beam lights.
  - The S 600's major change was the V-12, however it also included a range of other options, including an increased amount of leather on the interior, 4 heated and powered seats, four-zone (as opposed to two zone) climate control, parktronic (an object detection/warning feature) Many of these were offered as independent on options on other models also.
- Some major S-class options included Active Body Control, Keyless Go, Tire pressure monitoring system, and Electronic trunk closer, Designo and AMG packages, and various interior packages especially for seats and climate options

Examples of stock exterior paint colors/names offered included (in this case for the '06 S 65): Alabaster White, Almandine Black Metallic, Black, Black Opal Metallic, Bordeaux Red Metallic, Brilliant Silver Metallic, Capri Blue Metallic, Desert Silver Metallic, Everest Green Metallic, Flint Grey Metallic, Granite Grey Metallic, Horizon Blue Metallic, Midnight Blue, Obsidian Black, Pewter Metallic, Designo Graphite, Designo Mocha Black Metallic

=== Designo editions ===
The S-Class had two special design editions that were available for different drivetrains, it was trim and feature option set and the two choices were Designo Espresso and Designo Silver. Both included many interior trim items, like a wood shift knob, Alcantara headliner, and leather trim.

The Designo Espresso edition had Elm wood trim, and the Designo Silver edition had Maple wood trim. There were two Designo exterior paint options, designo Graphite and designo Mocha Black Metallic. The Espresso edition featured the Mocha paint, napa leather, and elm wood.

=== Integrated car phone systems ===
Phone systems offered during its model run include the Motorola Startac, carried over from W140 and offered in the first model year but replaced by the Mercedes-Benz/Motorola Timeport. Later, Mercedes-Benz offered the Motorola V60 as the car phone.

The "Timeport" phone with a voice control system was offered as an option on the Mercedes-Benz S-Class. The Timeport phone was similar to a Motorola Startac. In 2000, Mercedes and telecommunications and electronics company Motorola announced they would offer the Timeport cell phone system on all models in the year 2001. The Timeport cell-phone was a jointly developed and became available on all of Mercedes 2001 models (including the 2001 W220 S-Class) The Timeport phone was integrated with S-Class systems, major features included Voice-control and automatic mutein of the radio when accepting an incoming call (or tape or CD player). Another feature was that the directory of numbers in the phone could be downloaded to the car, and shown on the in-car display. Even though the phone was integrated as a system with car, it was portable handset that could be removed from the car. The cell-phone had an electro-luminescent Organic display with multiple colors available. The Mercedes-Benz Timeport phones were the only ones in the StarTac family to have the organic-luminescent display. (see also OLED) Another set of phones that the S-Class used were the Nokia 6150, Nokia 6210, Nokia 6310, and Nokia 6310i. These phones worked with S-Class equipped with D2B data communication system (another later system was the UHI).

As the years passed, various ways to connect different phones or systems to the COMAND or interface with existing cradles came to market, of varying ability and expense there is the issues of handling a connection to the system and then the software needed interface, and this task is affected by the model year and equipment options of any particular S-Class. One of the major advancements in this period was Bluetooth, and many modern updates are oriented towards this wireless data connection technology.

One option is the use a "puck" which plugs into the existing hardware, and engages the COMAND computer/software like an original device, but can talk to a modern device on the "other side" typically via Bluetooth. The advantage of using a puck in this style is it means the existing cradle and/or cabling has to be changed but still allows connecting with a variety of different devices, especially a wide-variety of "smart-phones" that became popular in the decade after the W220.

== Certificates and reports ==
In 2005, the S-Class was the first vehicle to receive a TÜV Institute environmental certificate from the German Commission on Technical Compliance for environmentally friendly components. The improved environmental efficiency of the W220 manufacture process was judged approvingly.

Edmunds gave the S-Class a 5 out of 5 reliability rating and MSN Autos assign an expert rating of 9.0 out of 10. By March 2011, Consumer Reports had changed its reliability ratings for the 2001 and 2002 S-Class as having improved to "average". Build quality was generally considered to be good. For instance, Forbes described the W220 S 500 as "built remarkably well." Early W220s were recalled for issues with the trunk spring and the hydraulic fuel line; there were no recalls for the 2005 or 2006 model years.

== Recalls ==
In 2006, nearly 24,000 (95%) S-Class sold in China between late 1998 and early 2005 were recalled due to a fuel tank defect. The recall was limited to the S-Class cars sold in China; S-Class models sold elsewhere were unaffected.

In 2006, a recall was initiated due to illumination failures in the instrument cluster of some W220s.

Examples of recalls in Australia include:

- 2000, a recall for the heater blower overheating issue
- 2004, for the V12 with ABC hydraulic line
- 2004, for a Blower fuse overheating in certain hot conditions
- 2007, an ABC hydraulic line could leak near hot engine components

Some other issues were noted with sensors or other components being potentially being damaged by water and/or heat. The model is also called the V220 (as opposed to W220).

== Maintenance/design features ==
One Canadian car site noted that older W220's can offer impressive features for the cost, provided that owners continue to maintain the vehicle. They noted a few key issues on later models including the air suspension and interior electronics. They also noted that over its production run Mercedes-Benz fixed many issues and there is also considerable variation in models depending how they were equipped.

=== Reed valve inside air/water duct: the Ventilation drain ===
One critical maintenance issue is the main ventilation drain (these are below the vents at the back of the hood/bonnet and below the windshield). If this drain becomes clogged such as from leaves or snow it can overflow, flooding the passenger compartment. When it overflows it can short out wiring in the car. There is an air and water vent on the right (passenger side) near the base of the windshield, under the hood, which among other features as a drain with a reed valve to allow water to drain out.

This issue was the subject of a Class-action lawsuit in the U.S. State of California.

The suit alleged that .. " alleging, among other things, that the reed valve in the air/water duct in 2001-2006 model year Mercedes-Benz S-Class (W220) and Mercedes-Benz CL-Class (W215) vehicles is susceptible to clogging by leaves, pine needles and other debris, which can cause water to accumulate in the air/water duct and to overflow into the passenger compartment, possibly resulting in damage to electrical and other components.."

—

In 2010, the United States Judge Howard Matz ruled on the settlement about this issue.

The air/water duct is drained by a reed valve, which if clogged can cause water to overflow into the passenger compartment. Other things that can cause water to enter an S-Class interior include the air conditioning condensation drain tubes.

The permanent solution to prevent water from flooding the interior is to simply to remove the reed valve in the cowling drain so the water can flow straight and through the drain.

== Aftermarket tuning ==
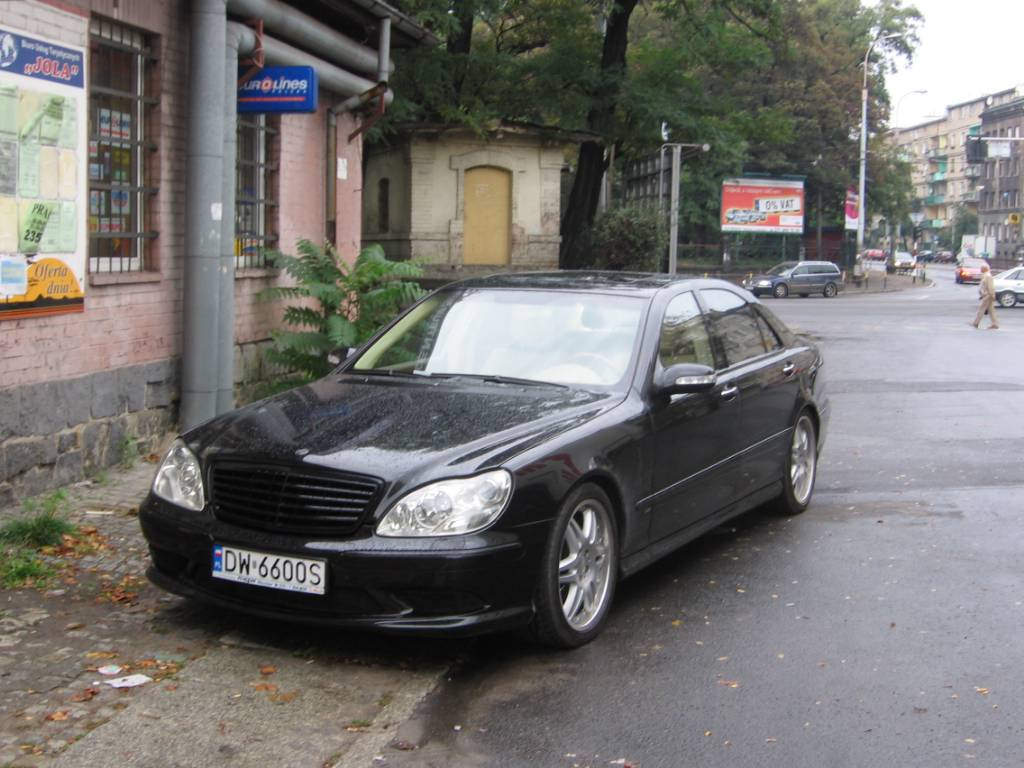
There were also aftermarket versions of the 1998-2006 S-Class (W220) by other companies, such as this one by the car tuner Brabus

Aftermarket tuning companies offered upgrades that increased the power of the naturally aspirated V-8 by up to 30 hp, and the turbocharged and supercharged versions by around 100-120 hp. On the M275 V-12 twin-turbo, an additional 200 hp could be achieved with extensive modifications going as far as improved heat management and modifications to the intercooler. Potential points of modification include intake, exhaust, fuel systems, transmissions, and the ECU.

An example of an aftermarket version of the S-Class was the 2001 Brabus S V12. This increased the displacement of the engine to 6.7 liters and the horsepower to 450. The changes also included interior luxury options like the BRABUS PC, enhanced leather trim options, and a 12-inch TFT (flat screen) display. The Brabus had a top speed of almost 190 mph and various other changes, including different tires and wheels (on the front 50.8 x 24.1 cm / 20.0 x 9.5 with 245/35ZR-20, and on the rear 50.8 x 24.1 cm / 20.0 x 9.5 also with 245/35ZR-20).

examples

- Kleemann S 60
  - Kleemann also produced a limited-slip differential for the W220 S-Class and some related models.
- Wald S-Class versions including the Black Bison version
- Brabus S-Class version
  - 2001 Brabus S V12
  - Brabus V-12 engine kit
  - See Brabus#Mercedes-Benz S-Class

== Related vehicles ==
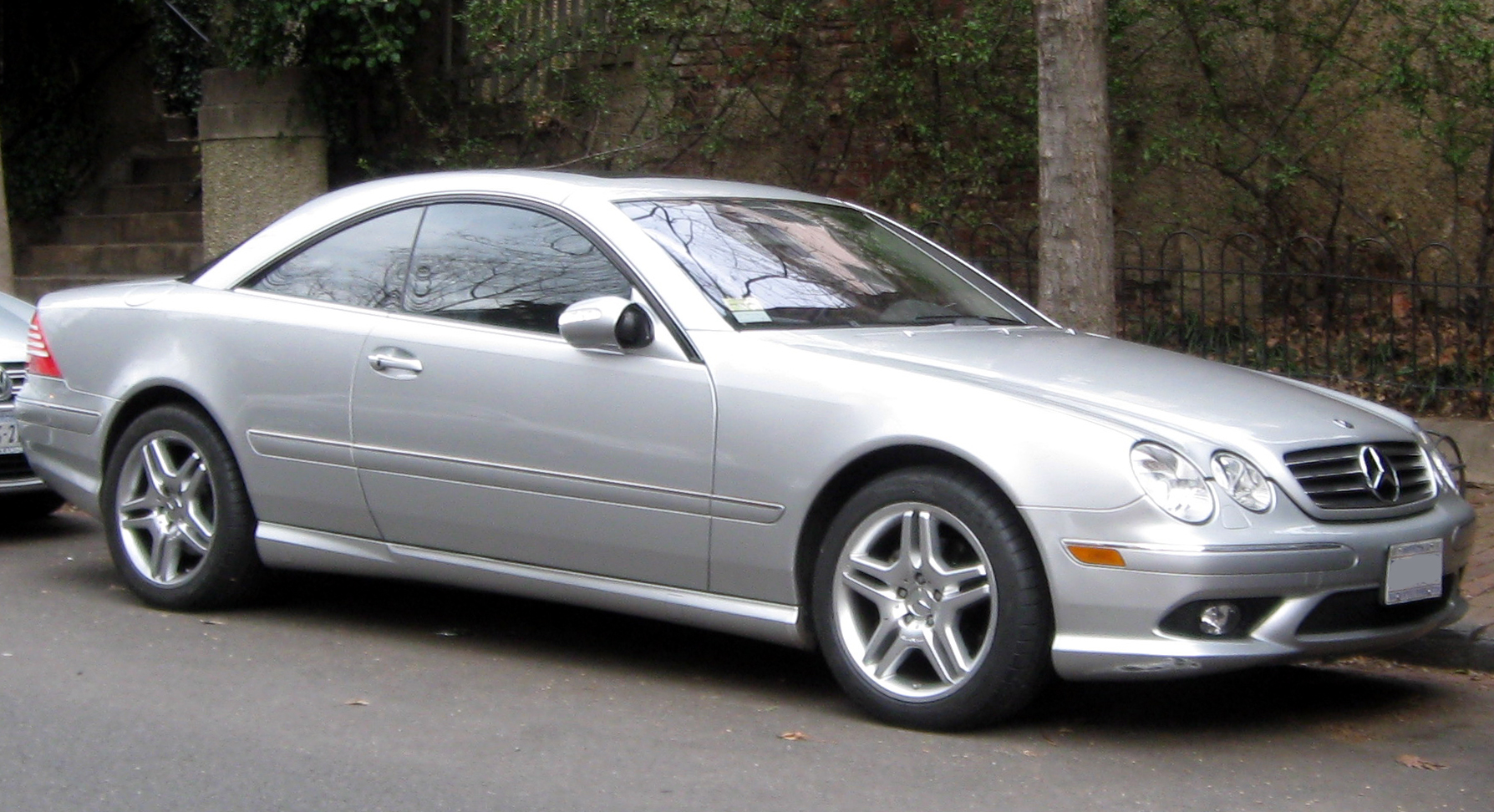
The Mercedes Benz CL Class (C215) from 1999 to 2006 was based on this S-Class chassis

- Mercedes-Benz CL-Class (C215) Shorter coupe version of W220 shared many components and features from the sedan, albeit a completely unique aluminium and composite body construction riding on an 8-inch shorter wheelbase, with ABC suspension as standard equipment. V8 and V12 engines with their respective model nomenclature were carried over to the a 2-door coupe, no diesel or V6 options were available.
- Chrysler LX platform (reused some W220 suspension components from 2005) (note: Chrysler was part of Daimler during much of this period (1998–2007), and there were many cross brand standardizations)

== See also ==
- Comand APS (Cockpit Management and Data system)
- Daimler-Chrysler
- List of Mercedes-Benz vehicles
- W220 S-Class Encyclopedia (A detailed encyclopedia on the vehicle systems, and repair guides)
