= Mercedes-Benz OM648 engine =

Mercedes-Benz OM648
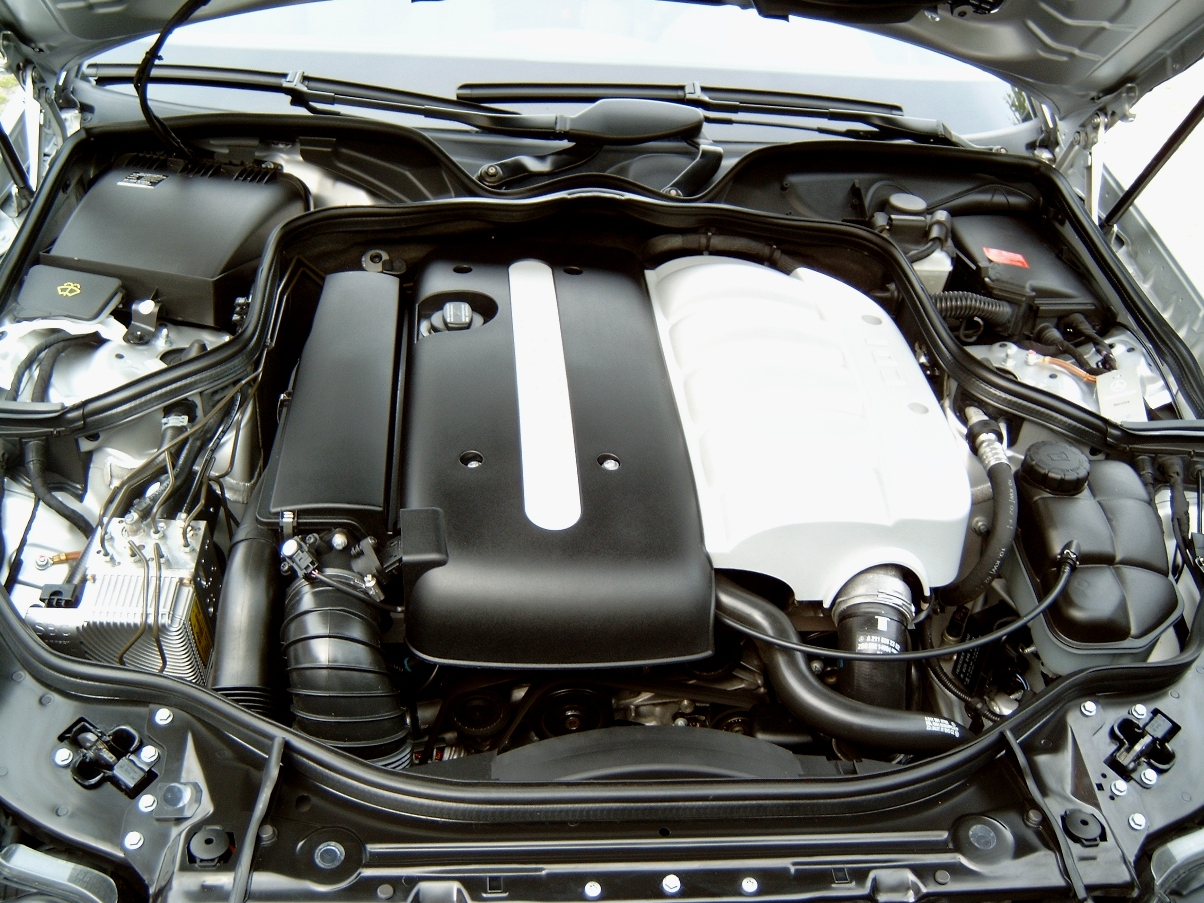

Overview
- Manufacturer: Mercedes-Benz
- Production: 2002-2006

Layout
- Configuration: Inline 6
- Displacement: 3.2 L (3,222 cc)
- Cylinder bore: 88 mm (3.46 in)
- Piston stroke: 88.3 mm (3.48 in)
- Cylinder block material: Cast iron
- Cylinder head material: Aluminum
- Valvetrain: DOHC 4 valves x cyl.

Combustion
- Turbocharger: Single variable nozzle
- Fuel system: common rail fuel injection
- Fuel type: Diesel
- Oil system: Wet sump
- Cooling system: Water cooled

Output
- Power output: 204 PS (150 kW; 201 hp)
- Specific power: 63.3 PS (46.6 kW; 62.4 hp) per litre
- Torque output: 500 N⋅m (369 lb⋅ft)

Chronology
- Predecessor: OM613
- Successor: OM642

The Mercedes-Benz OM648 engine is a 3.2 litre, straight-6 4 valves per cylinder, cast iron block diesel engine manufactured by the Mercedes-Benz division of Daimler AG as a replacement for the previous Mercedes-Benz inline-5 and -6 engines.

The engine features common rail fuel injection and a variable nozzle turbocharger. The injection system operates at 1,600 bar (23,000 psi).

Power output is 204 PS (150 kW; 201 hp) at 4200 rpm and 500 N⋅m (369 lb⋅ft) of torque from 1,800 to 2,600 rpm.

Mercedes claims this engine will propel the E320 CDI to 60 mph (97 km/h) in 6.6 seconds. All while managing 27 mpg_{‑US} (8.7 L/100 km; 32 mpg_{‑imp})+ city and 37 mpg_{‑US} (6.4 L/100 km; 44 mpg_{‑imp})+ Highway

Oil specification MB 229.31 or MB 228.31 is recommended and has a service interval of 13,000 miles (21,000 km) using the specified oil.

OM648 is the successor to the OM613.

== Technical specifications ==
Displacement	Bore x Stroke	Power	Torque	Applications
3.2 L; 196.6 cu in (3,222 cc)	88 mm × 88.3 mm (3.46 in × 3.48 in)	204 PS (150 kW; 201 hp) at 4200 rpm	500 N⋅m (370 lb⋅ft) at 1800 rpm	2002-2006 (?) E320 CDI and 2002-2005 S320 CDI
