= Mercedes-Benz OM613 engine =

Mercedes-Benz OM613
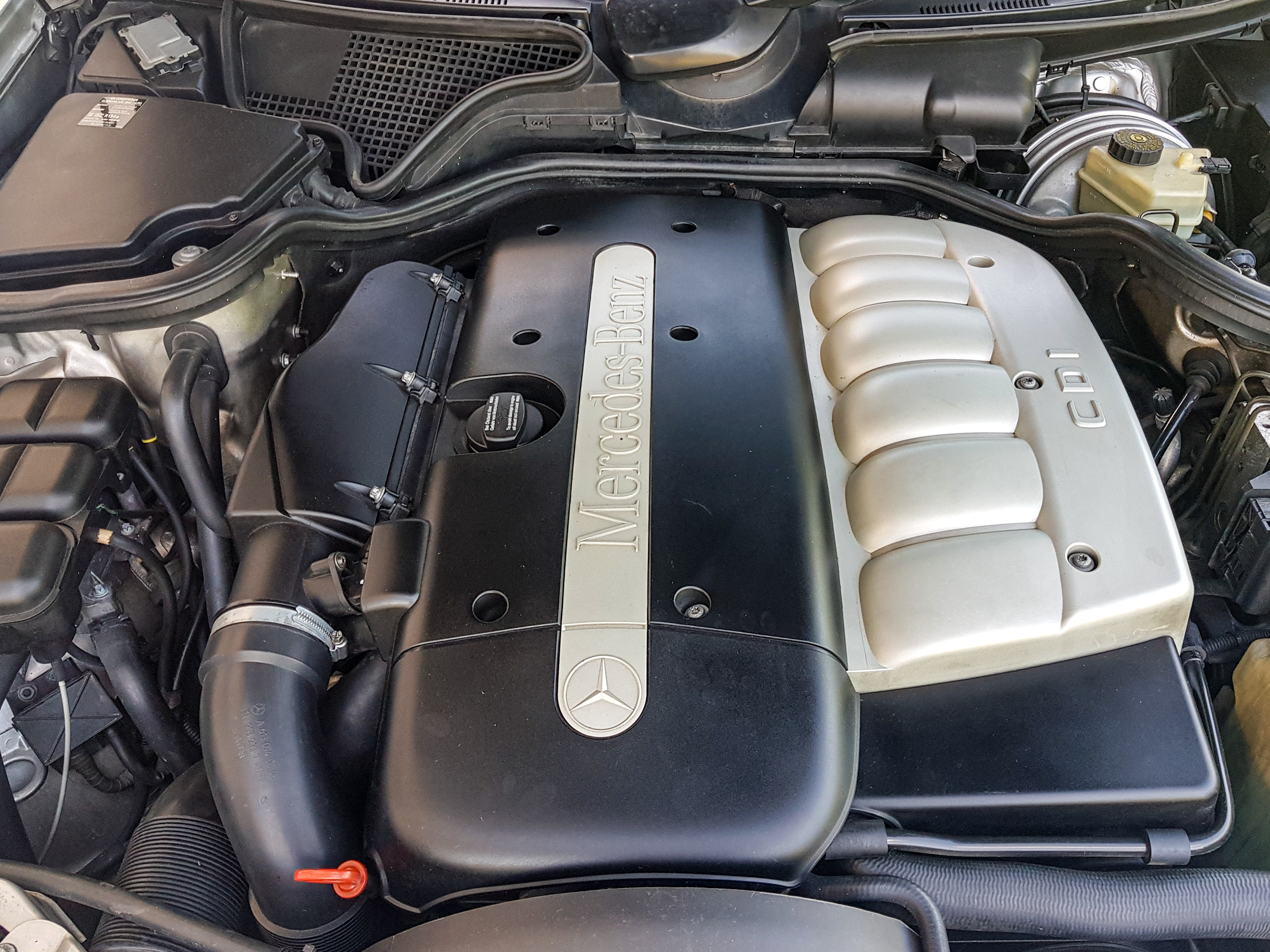

Overview
- Manufacturer: Mercedes-Benz
- Production: 1999–2003

Layout
- Configuration: Straight-six engine
- Displacement: 3.2 L; 196.6 cu in (3,222 cc)
- Cylinder bore: 88 mm (3.46 in)
- Piston stroke: 88.3 mm (3.48 in)
- Cylinder block material: Cast iron
- Valvetrain: DOHC
- Compression ratio: 18.0:1

Combustion
- Turbocharger: Single-turbo
- Fuel system: Common rail direct injection
- Fuel type: Diesel
- Cooling system: Water cooled

Output
- Power output: 145 kW (197 PS; 194 hp)
- Specific power: 45 kW (61.2 PS; 60.3 hp) per litre
- Torque output: 470 N⋅m (347 lb⋅ft)

Chronology
- Predecessor: Mercedes-Benz OM606 engine
- Successor: Mercedes-Benz OM648 engine

The OM613 is a turbocharged straight 6 diesel engine produced by Mercedes-Benz. It is the successor to the OM606 and was replaced by the OM648 engine in 2003.

== Design ==
The OM613 was developed alongside the four-cylinder OM611 and five-cylinder OM612 engines. The three engines have the same basic design and share components such as the pistons, fuel injectors, and glow plugs. The OM613 engine features 4 valves per cylinder, dual overhead camshafts, oxidation catalytic converter, and exhaust gas recirculation. Models with the engine are branded as '320 CDI'.

== Models ==
Engine	Power	Torque	Years
OM613 DE32 LA	145 kW (197 PS; 194 hp) @ 3,000-4,200 rpm	470 N⋅m (347 lb⋅ft) @ 1,800–2,600 rpm	1999–2003

=== OM613 DE32 LA ===
- 1999–2002 W210 E320 CDI
- 1999–2002 W220 S320 CDI
