= SsangYong Actyon =

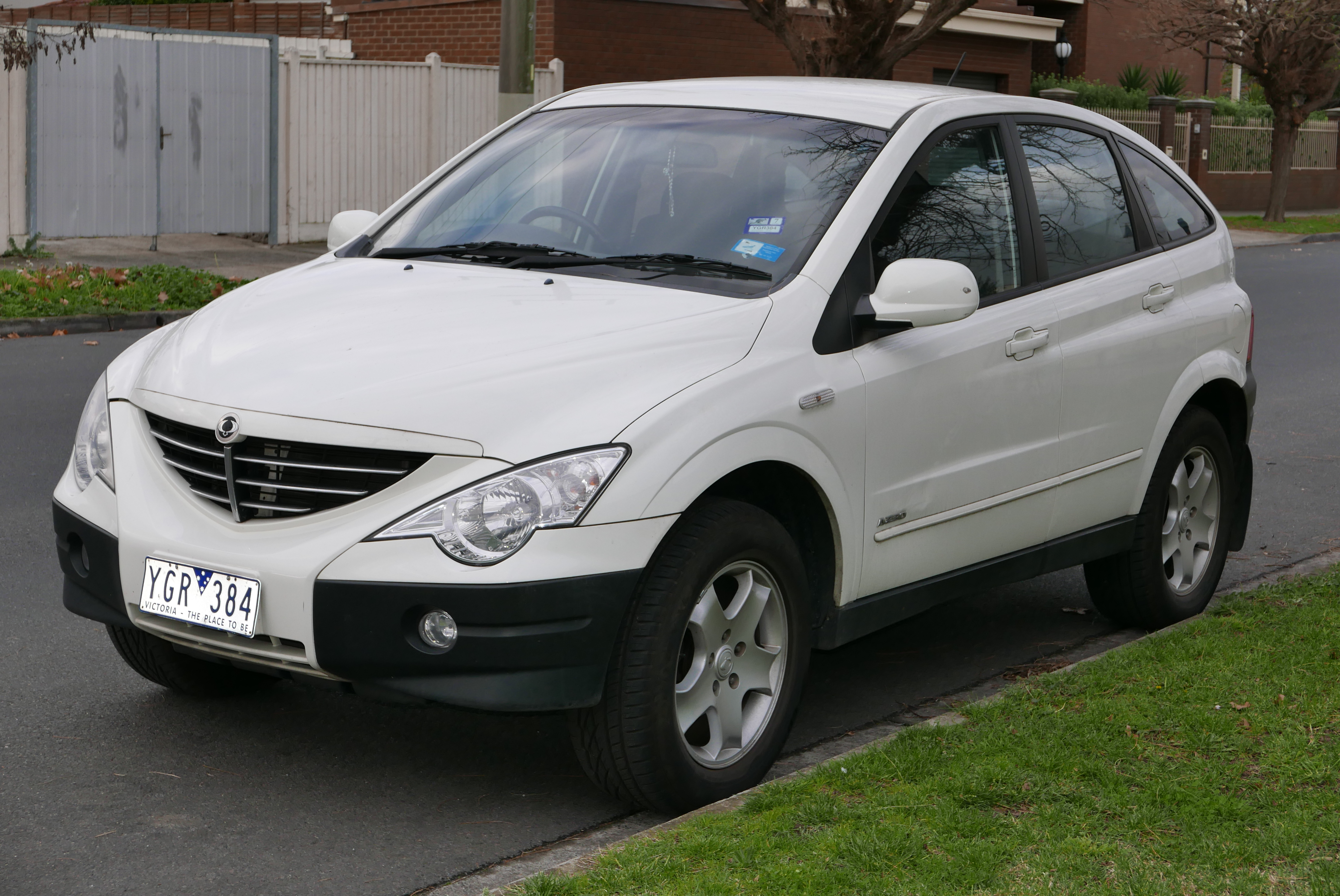

Overview
- Manufacturer: SsangYong Motor
- Also called: For Actyon SUV: SsangYong Korando (Ecuador, 2006–2011); SsangYong Nomad (Kazakhstan, 2014–2017); Phoenix SUV; For Actyon Sports: Phoenix SUT; SsangYong Korando Sports (South Korea, 2012-2018); SsangYong Musso (UK, 2016–2018); Daehan Actyon Sports (Laos)
- Production: 2005–2010 (Actyon); 2006–2018 (Actyon Sports)
- Assembly: South Korea: Pyeongtaek; Ukraine: Kremenchuk (Kremenchug Auto)

Body and chassis
- Class: Compact SUV (Actyon); Mid-size pickup truck (Actyon Sports)
- Body style: 5-door wagon (Actyon); 4-door pick-up (Actyon Sports)
- Layout: Front engine, rear-wheel drive / four-wheel drive

Dimensions
- Wheelbase: 2,740 mm (107.9 in) (Actyon); 3,060 mm (120.5 in) (Actyon Sports)
- Length: 4,455 mm (175.4 in) (Actyon); 4,965 mm (195.5 in) (Actyon Sports)
- Width: 1,880 mm (74.0 in) (Actyon); 1,900 mm (74.8 in) (Actyon Sports)
- Height: 1,735 mm (68.3 in) (Actyon); 1,755 mm (69.1 in) (Actyon Sports)

Chronology
- Predecessor: SsangYong Musso; SsangYong Korando (1996-2006); SsangYong Musso Sports
- Successor: SsangYong Korando (C200 series); SsangYong Musso (Q200 series); KGM Actyon

The SsangYong Actyon /ækˈtiːən/ (Korean: 쌍용 액티언) is a compact SUV built by the South Korean automobile manufacturer SsangYong Motor from 2005 to 2011 for the first generation, and 2012 to 2018 for the second. It was available either as an SUV (Actyon) or as a pick-up truck (Actyon Sports). They replaced the SsangYong Musso and Musso Sports. The name is an amalgam of the words "action" and "young". In 2024, SsangYong under the new name KG Mobility reused the Actyon nameplate for the KGM Actyon, an SUV based on the KGM Torres.

== Overview ==
Both are available 2WD or 4WD systems and a third generation common rail VGT turbo diesel engine, or a 2.3 litre overhead cam four cylinder petrol engine.

The vehicle also comes with a double wishbone front suspension and a five-link rear end in addition to ESP (Electronic Stability Program). Along with ESP, the Actyon also comes with hill descent control as standard (on some models).

The diesel engine sourced from Europe produces 104 kW (139 hp) of power at 4000 rpm and 310 N⋅m (229 lb⋅ft) of torque at 2700 rpm. The 2.3 litre petrol engine produces around 110 kW (148 hp) at 5500 rpm and 214 N⋅m (158 lb⋅ft) at 4500 rpm.

Other optional equipment includes keyless entry, dual airbags, speed sensitive central locking, engine immobilizer and alarm, electric windows, child safety door locks and tray liner. Initially offered with a four speed automatic, the Actyon was later upgraded with a six speed automatic transmission sourced from Australian company Drivetrain Systems International.

For a few years, there was no Australian importer for SsangYong so the supply contract for the automatic transmissions disappeared, and Drivetrain Systems International went into receivership, eventually being bought out by conglomerate Geely, where then all manufacturing was moved to China. After a number of issues with the six speed automatic transmissions, SsangYong reverted to a five speed automatic transmission for the automatic Actyon Sports.

Phoenix Motorcars in Ontario, California introduced the electrically powered Phoenix SUV and Phoenix SUT for fleet managers, both based on the chassis of the original Actyon and Actyon Sports. In June 2010, the Actyon received a facelift. In April 2018, Ssangyong declared the discontinuation of the Actyon after poor sales.

== Actyon Sports ==
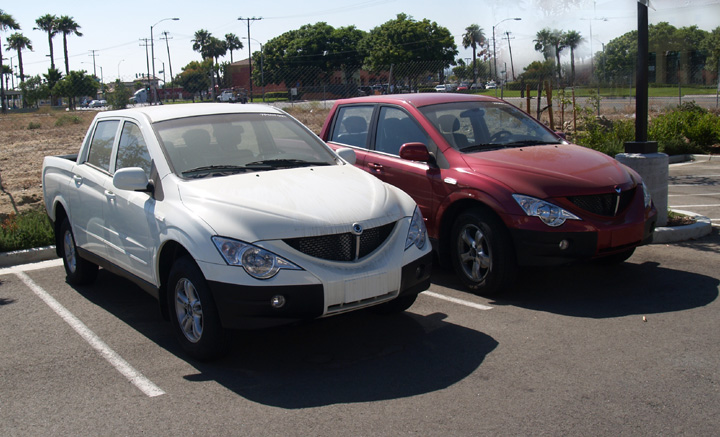
Phoenix SUT

A year into Actyon production, a mid-size pickup truck variant was announced, called the Actyon Sports. This variant outlasted its namesake, in production until 2018 with the release of the Musso Q200. Replacing the original Musso Sports, the Actyon Sports has a wider track, increased load capacity and a more fuel efficient European designed engine.

=== Safety ===
ANCAP test results Ssangyong Actyon Sports Ute (2010)
Test	Score
Overall	3 /5 stars
Frontal offset	7.01/16
Side impact	16/16
Pole	Not Assessed
Seat belt reminders	1/3
Whiplash protection	Pending
Pedestrian protection	Poor
Electronic stability control	Not Available

== Redesign ==
In 2012, SsangYong launched an updated version of the Actyon Sports pickup, which in the market of Korea is called Korando Sports, which is essentially a production version of the SUT–1 Concept Car, as seen in the 2011 Geneva Motor Show. They also launched a facelifted Actyon SUV called the SsangYong Nomad in 2014, but it was mainly sold in Kazakhstan until 2017.

== Motorsport ==
SsangYong New Zealand launched the Actyon Racing series in 2014. The series features a field of slightly modified Actyons with identical drivetrains, allowing driver ability to determine race outcomes. The racing Actyons are equipped with a 2.3-liter petrol engine by Mercedes-Benz, paired with a locally sourced four-speed sequential gearbox and an open differential. The suspension has been lowered to improve handling, and a full protective roll cage and harnesses have been installed.

== Gallery ==
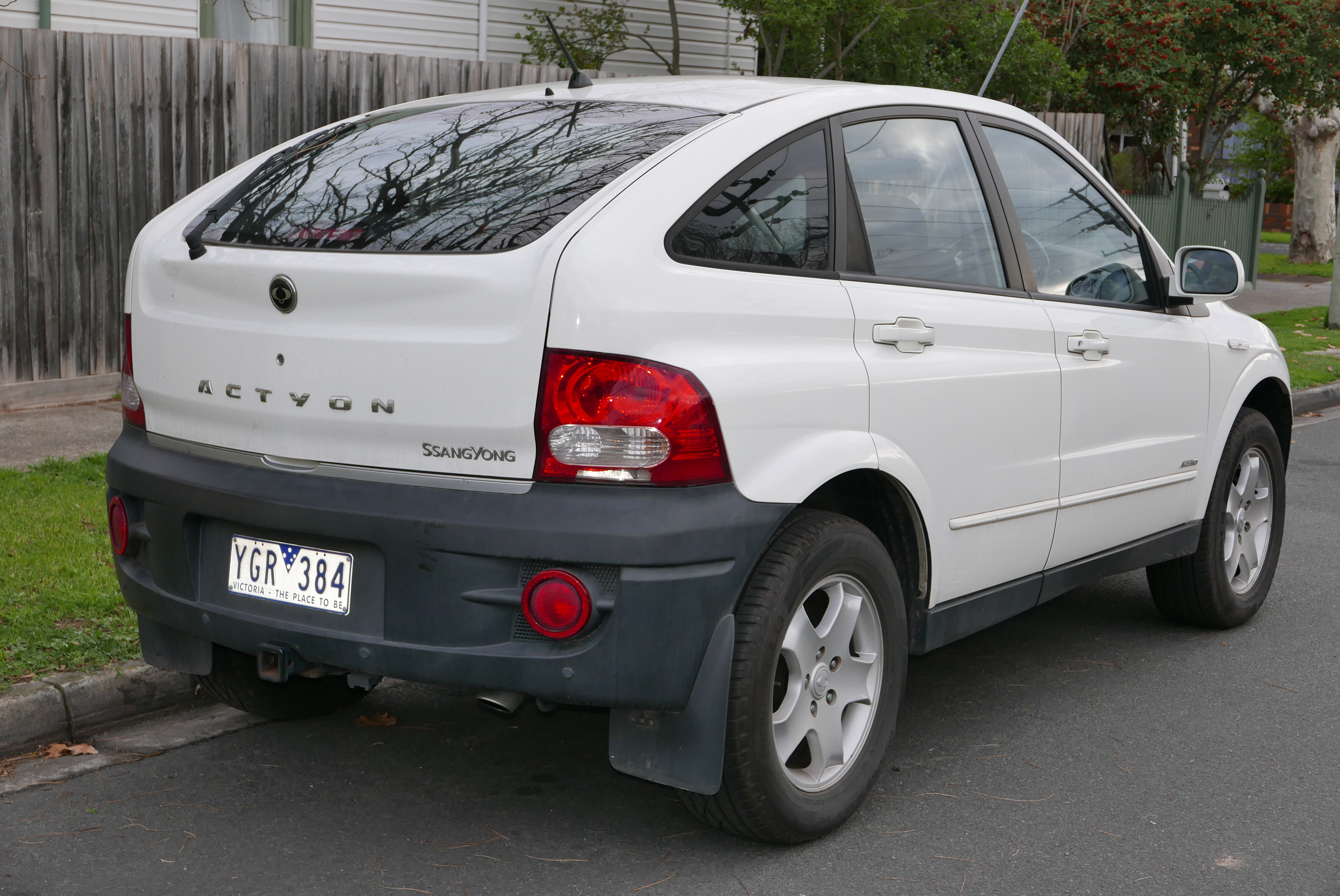
Pre-facelift Actyon

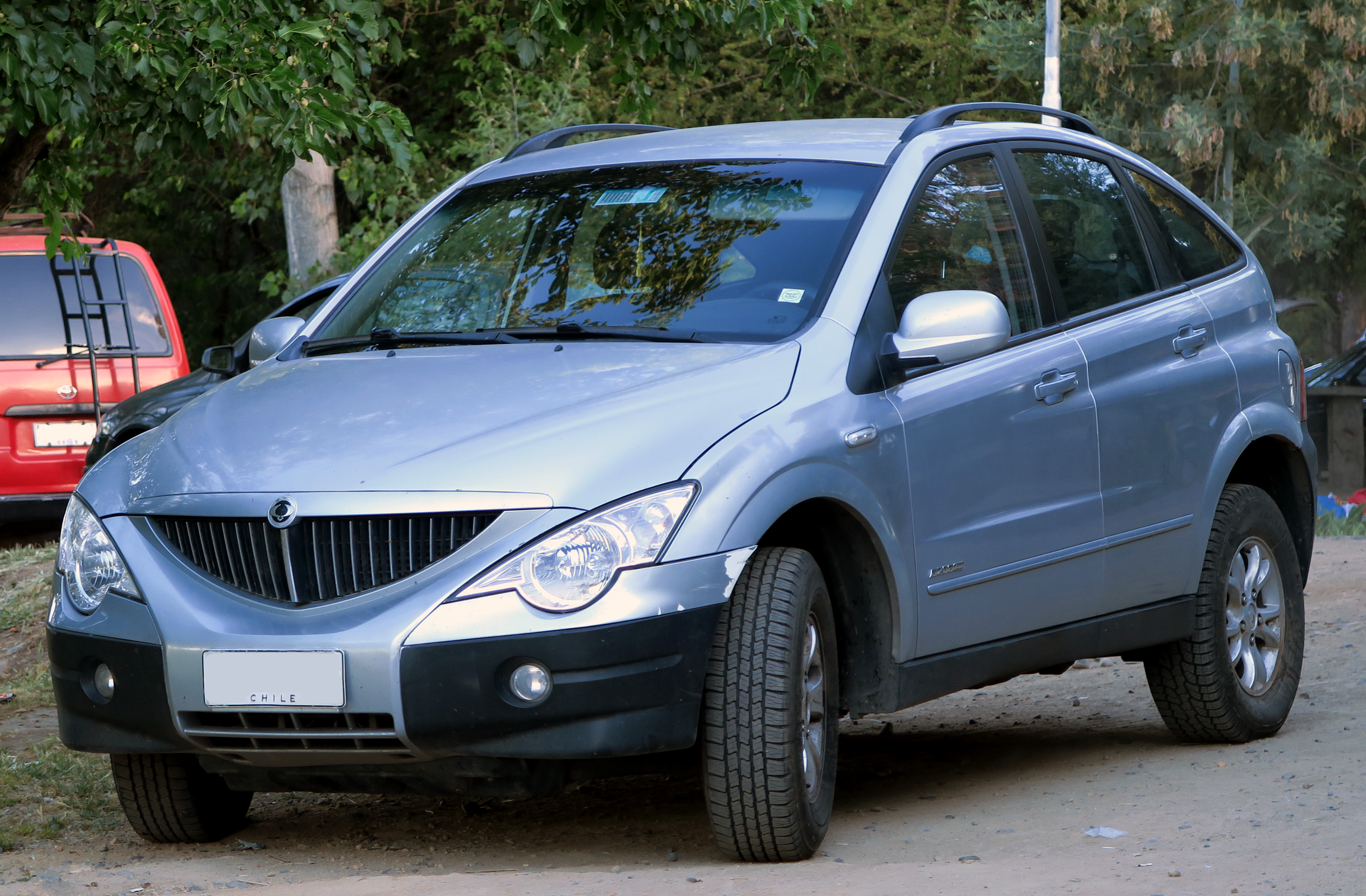
Pre-facelift Actyon

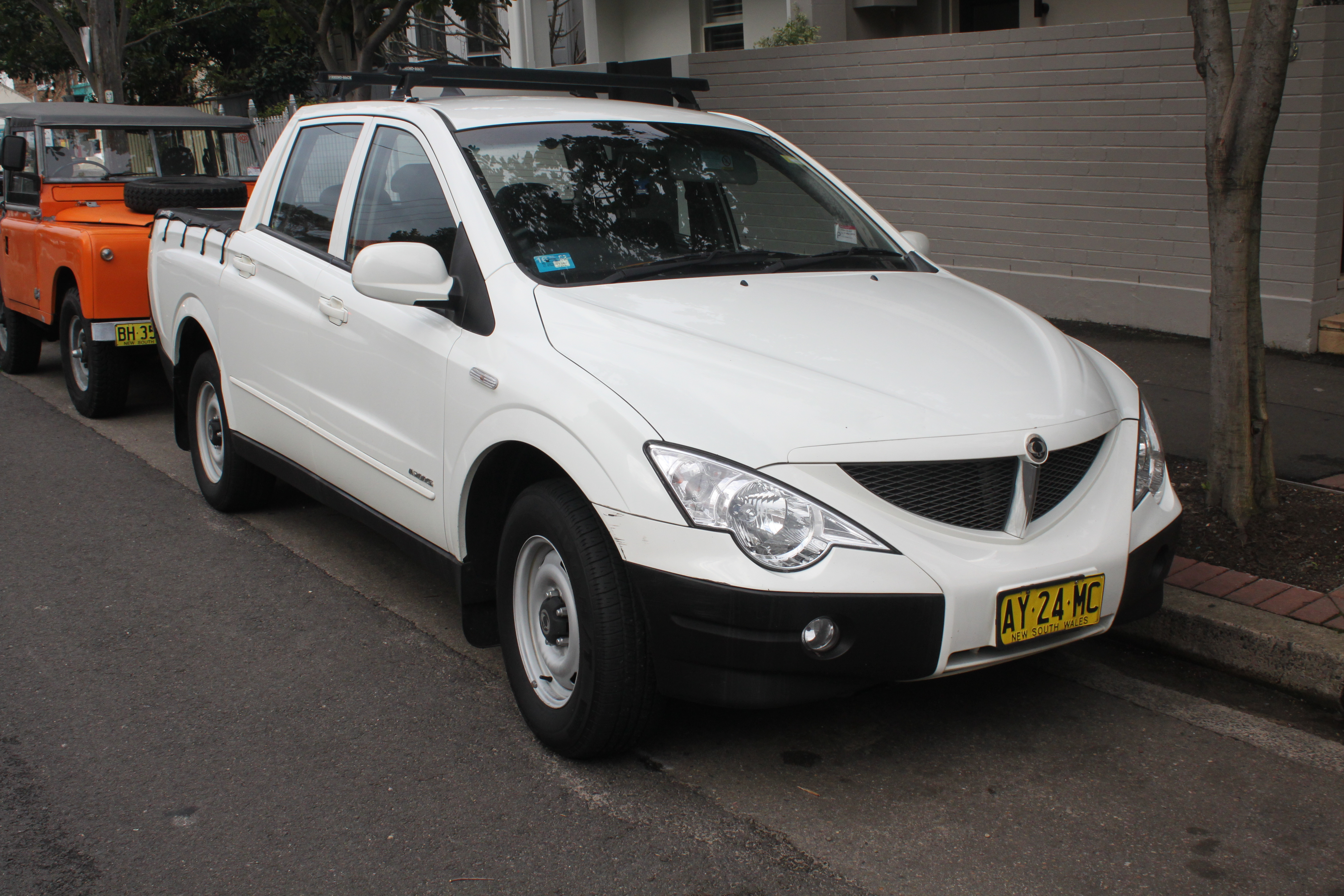
Pre-facelift Actyon Sports

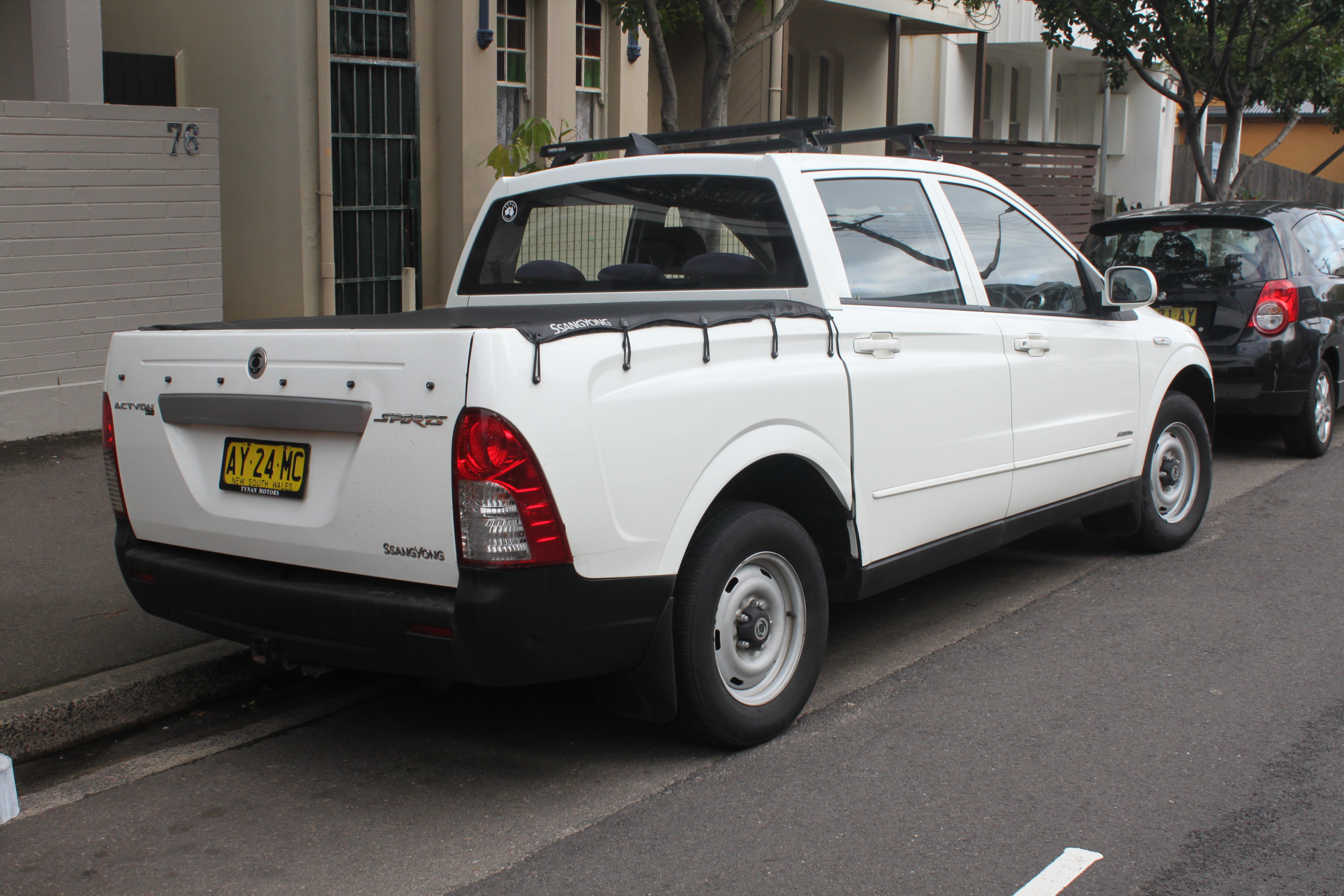
Pre-facelift Actyon Sports

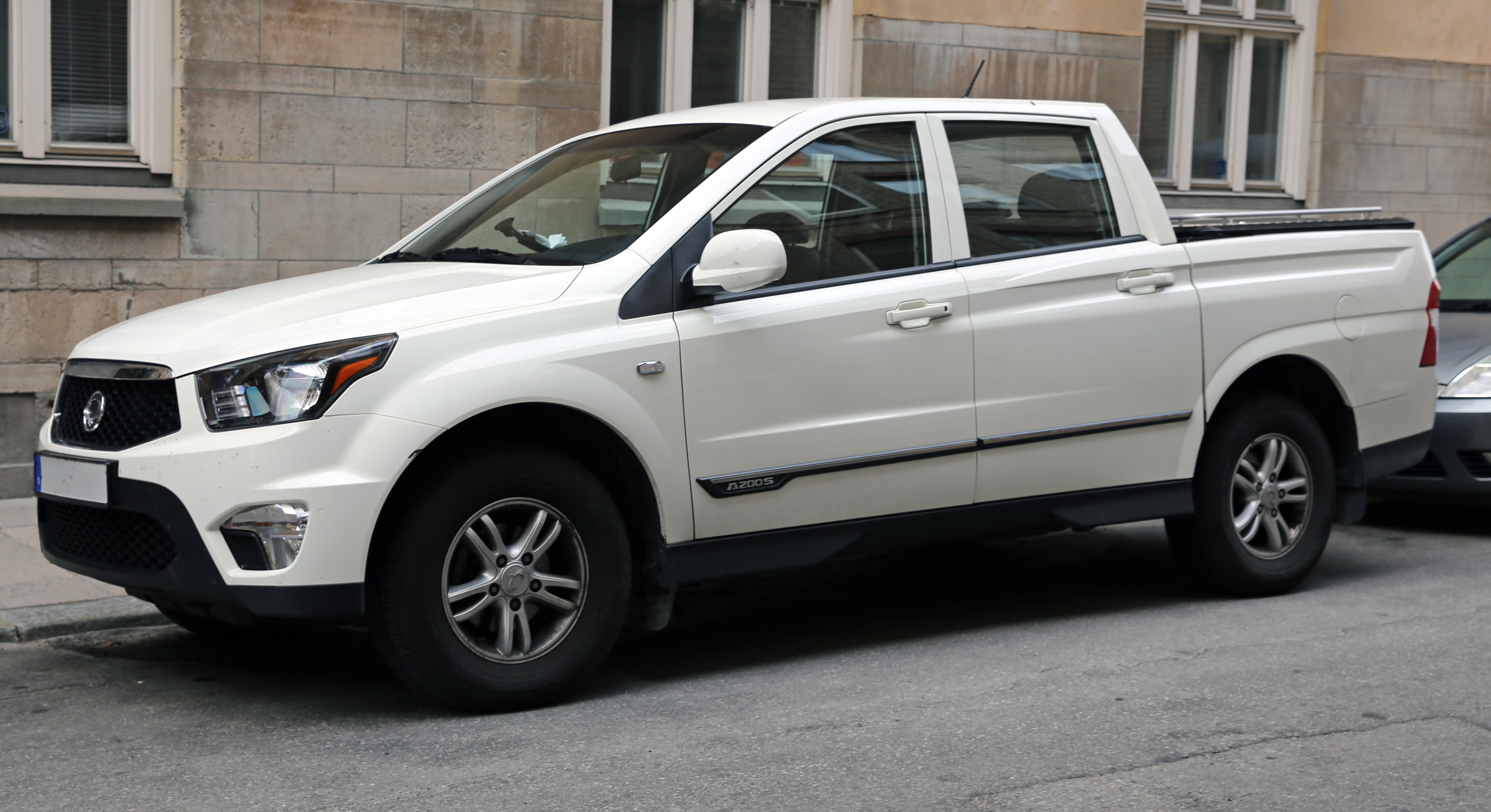
Facelifted Actyon Sports

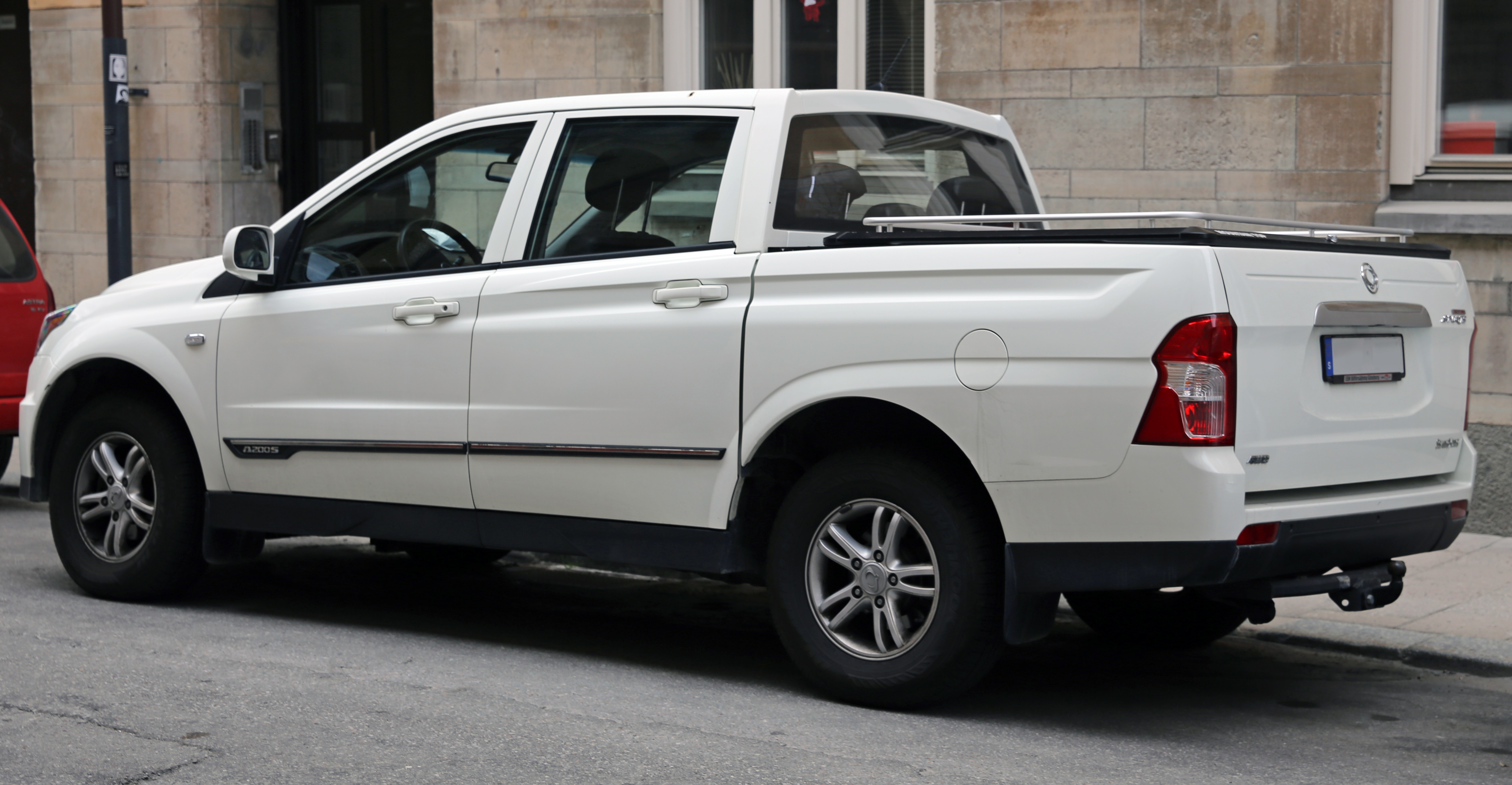
Facelifted Actyon Sports

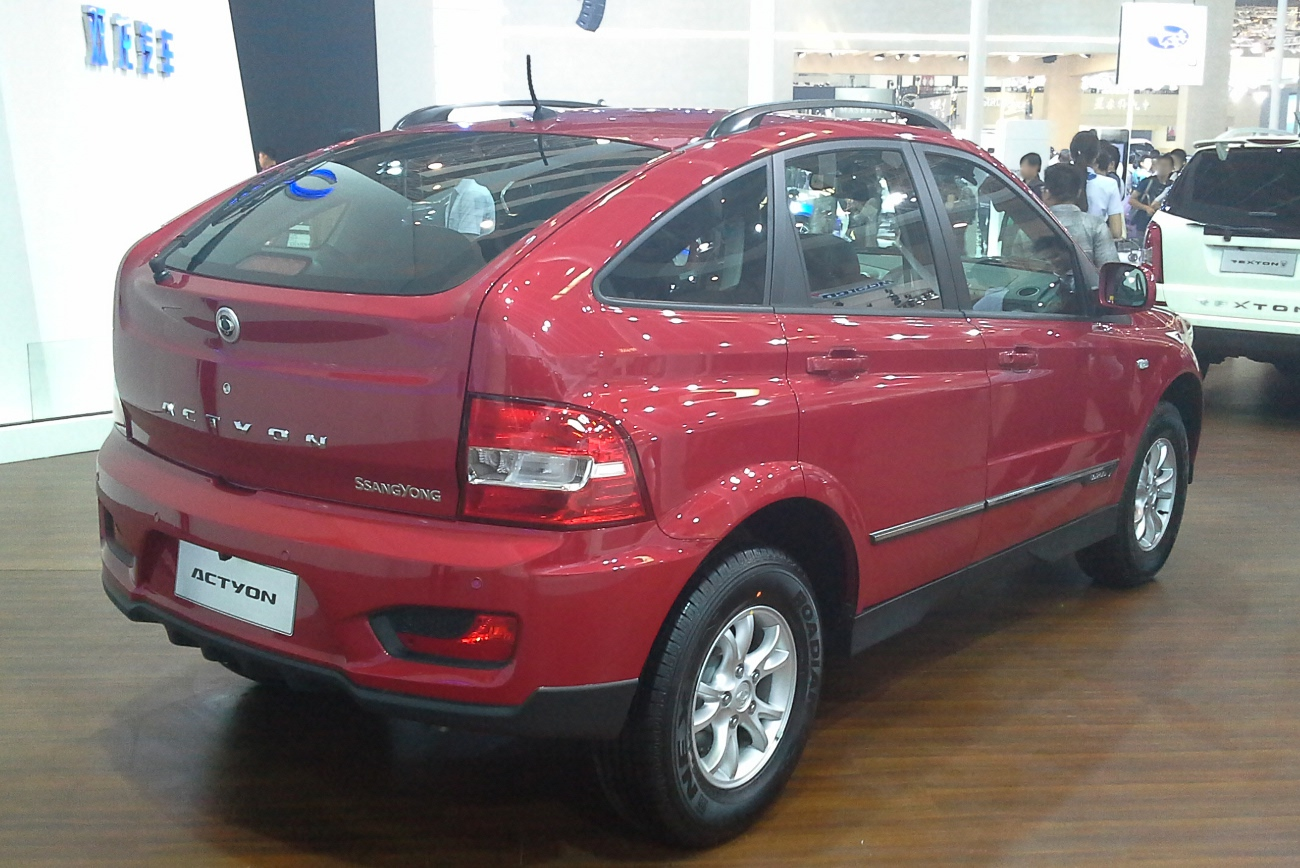
Facelifted Actyon

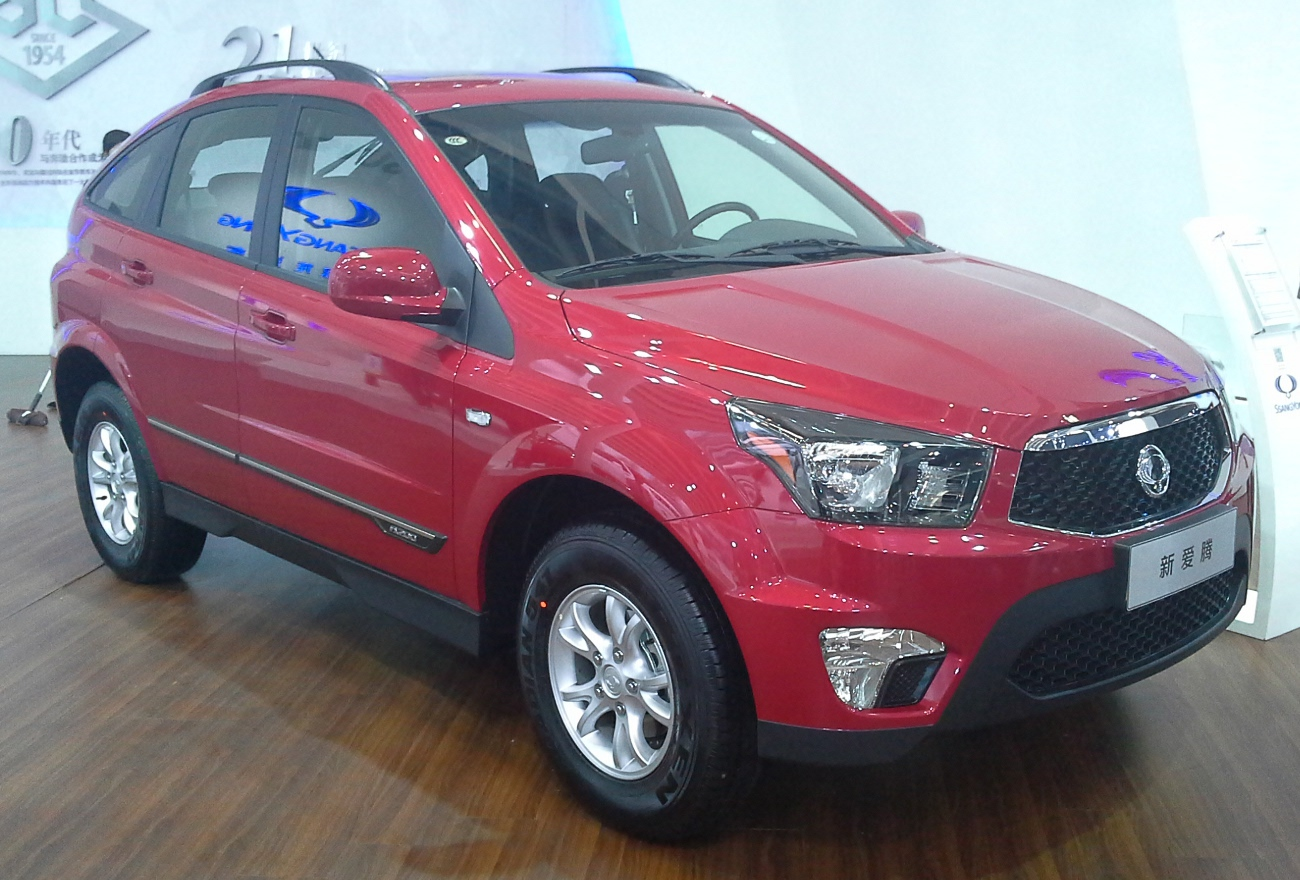
Facelifted Actyon
