= KG Mobility =

South Korean car manufacturer

KG Mobility Corporation
- Native name: 케이지모빌리티 주식회사 (Note: Also written as KG모빌리티 주식회사.)
- Formerly: Ha Dong-hwan Motor Company; Dong-A Motor Company; SsangYong Motor Company
- Type: Public
- Traded as: KRX: 003620
- Industry: Automotive
- Founded: 4 March 1953; 73 years ago
- Headquarters: Pyeongtaek, Gyeonggi Province, South Korea
- Area served: Worldwide (except Japan and North America)
- Key people: Hwang Ki-young and Park Jang-ho (Co-CEOs)
- Products: SUVs and commercial vehicles
- Production output: ▲116,099 (2023)
- Revenue: ▲ ₩3.74 trillion (2023)
- Operating income: ▲ ₩12.54 billion (2023)
- Net income: ▲ ₩8.92 billion (2023)
- Total assets: ▲ ₩2.64 trillion (2023)
- Total equity: ▼ ₩1.08 trillion (2023)
- Number of employees: 4,365 (2012)
- Parent: KG ETS (KG Group)
- Subsidiaries: KGM Commercial
- Website: kg-mobility.com

The KG Mobility Corporation (Korean: 케이지모빌리티 주식회사, lit. 'KG Mobility Stock Company'), abbreviated as KGM, is a South Korean automobile manufacturer. It traces its origins back to Dong-A Motor, a manufacturer established in 1954. The company was named SsangYong Motor Company in 1988, following its acquisition in 1986 by the SsangYong Group, a chaebol. Since then, SsangYong Motor has been acquired successively by Daewoo Motors, Chinese manufacturer SAIC Motor, and Indian manufacturer Mahindra & Mahindra. In 2022, the company was acquired by South Korean chaebol KG Group and adopted its present name in March 2023. In certain markets, including Australia and Turkey, the company continues to use "Ssangyong" or "KGM Ssangyong" branding.

The company's main focus is sport utility vehicles (SUVs) and crossover SUVs, and it is transitioning its focus to electric cars. The KGM Commercial manufactures commercial vehicles, including electric buses.

== History ==
=== Dong-A Motor (1954–1987) ===
SsangYong originally started out as two separate companies; Ha Dong-hwan Motor Workshop (established in 1954) and Dongbang Motor Co (established in 1962). In mid-1963, the two companies merged into Ha Dong-hwan Motor Co. (Korean: 하동환자동차공업주식회사). In 1964, Hadonghwan Motor Company started building jeeps for the US Army as well as trucks and buses. Beginning in 1976, Hadonghwan produced a variety of special purpose vehicles. After changing its name to Dong-A Motor (Korean: 동아자동차공업주식회사) in 1977 and taking control of Keohwa in 1984, it was taken over by SsangYong Business Group in 1986.

==== Gallery ====
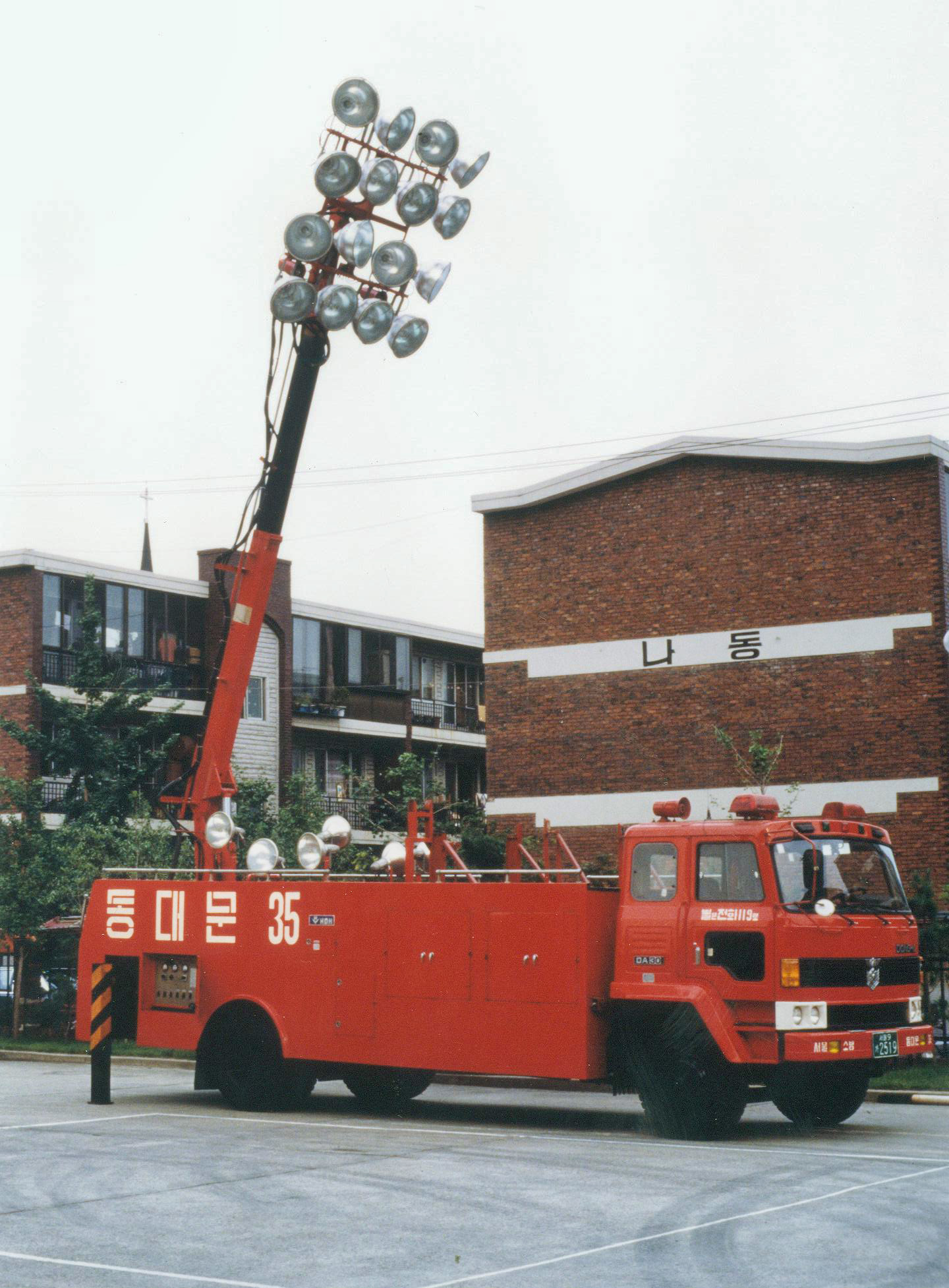
Dong-A DA 30 with Ha Dong-hwan body

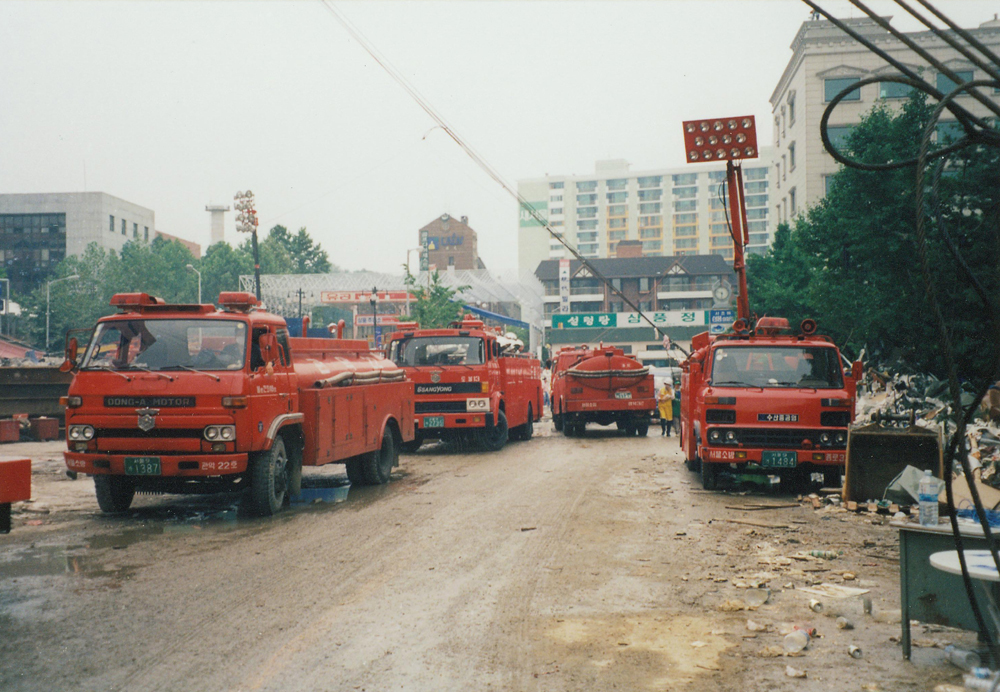
Firetrucks produced by SsangYong and its predecessor, Dong-A Motor

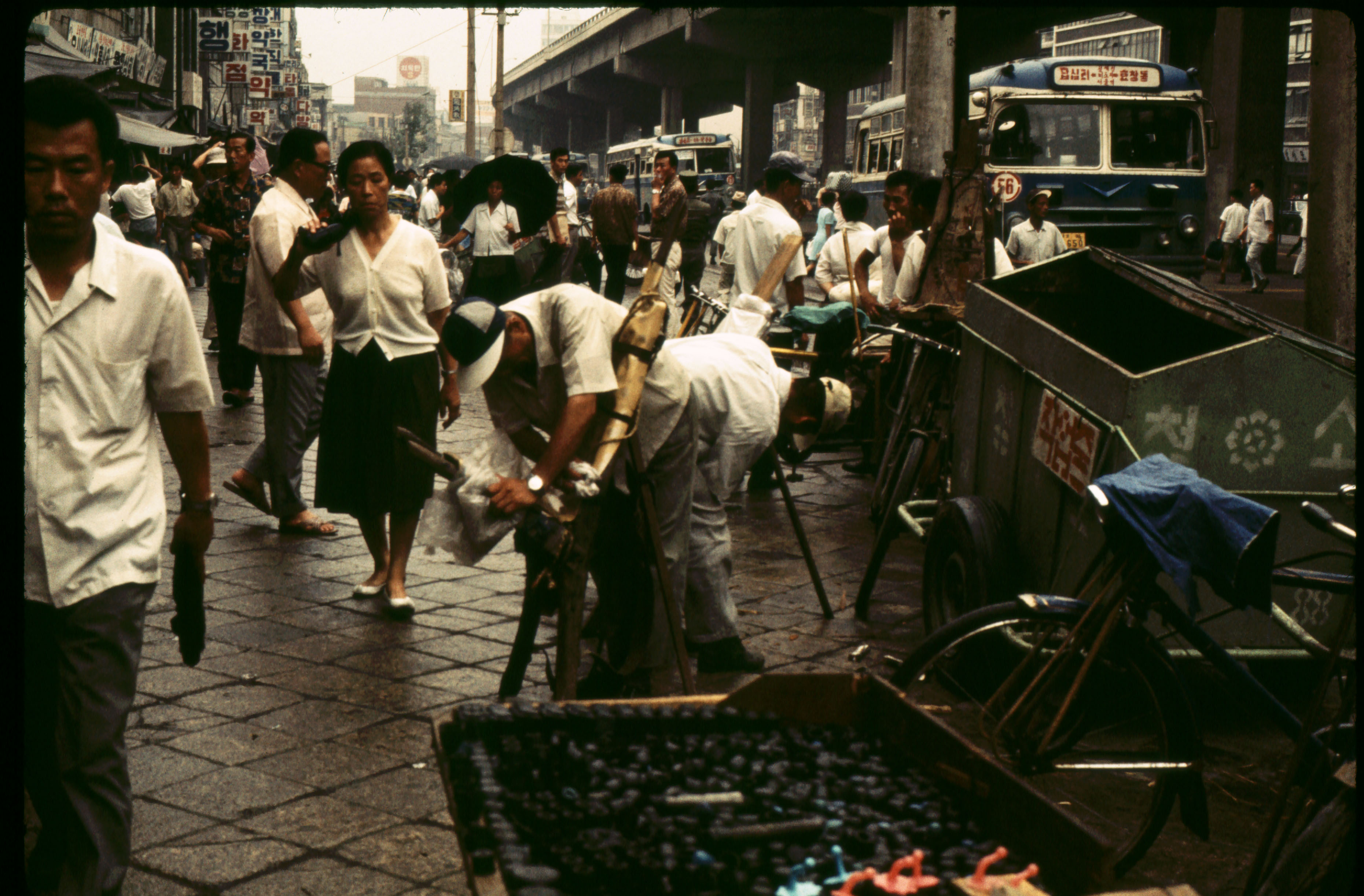
Ha Dong-hwan bus on the right

=== Keohwa (1981–1984) ===
Keohwa, Ltd. (Korean: 주식회사 거화; RR: Jusighoesa Geohwa) was a South Korean assembler of Jeeps under licence, mainly for export markets. Its predecessor was the Jeep assembly joint venture of Shinjin Motors and American Motor Corporation (AMC), established in 1974. It was spun off as an independent company in 1981, after AMC left the venture and retired the permission to use the Jeep trade mark. In 1983, Jeeps from Keohwa started to be named as "Korando". In 1984, Keohwa was acquired by the predecessor of SsangYong Motor, Dong-A Motor.

=== SsangYong Motor Company (1986–2023) ===
SsangYong logo

After Dong-A Motor was taken over by SsangYong Business Group, Dong-A Motor's name was changed to SsangYong Motor in 1988. In 1987, it acquired United Kingdom-based specialty car maker Panther Westwinds.

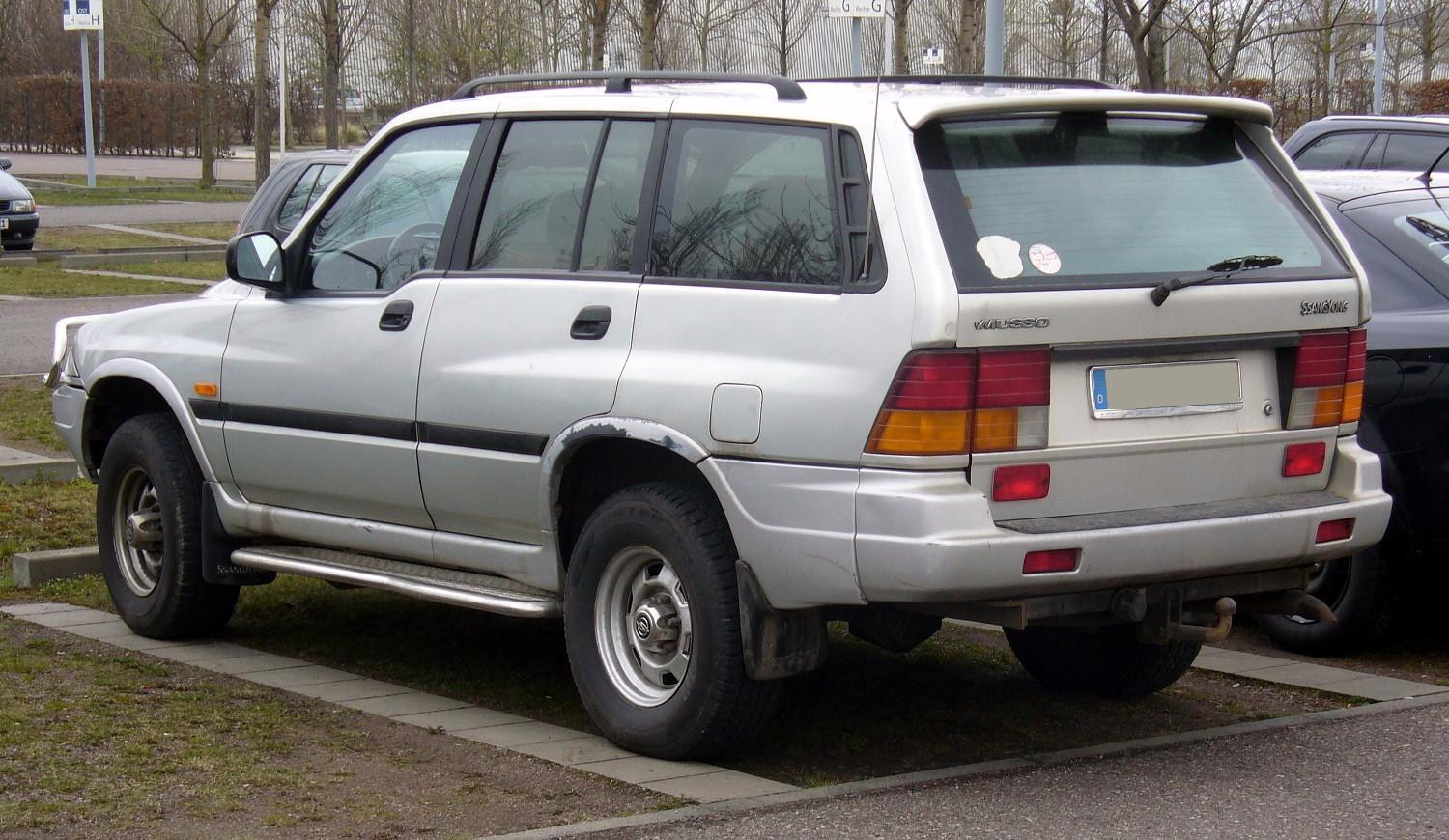
The Musso was a result of collaboration between SsangYong and Daimler-Benz

In 1991, SsangYong started a technology partnership with Daimler-Benz. The deal was for SsangYong to develop a sport utility vehicle (SUV) with Mercedes-Benz technology. This was supposedly to allow SsangYong to gain footholds in new markets without having to build their own infrastructure (utilizing existing Mercedes-Benz networks) while giving Mercedes a competitor in the then-booming SUV market. This resulted in the Musso, which was sold first by Mercedes-Benz and later by SsangYong.

SsangYong further benefited from this alliance, long after Daimler-Benz stopped selling the Musso, producing a badge engineered version of the Mercedes-Benz MB100, the Istana and using Daimler designs in many other models, including the second-generation Korando (engine and transmission), the Rexton (transmission), the Chairman H (chassis and transmission) and the Kyron (transmission).

==== Takeover by Daewoo Motors and SAIC ====
In 1997, Daewoo Motors, now GM Korea, bought a controlling stake from the SsangYong Group, only to sell it off again in 2000, because the conglomerate ran into deep financial troubles. In late 2004, the Chinese automobile manufacturer SAIC took a 51% stake of SsangYong Motor Company. In July – August 2006, workers went on strike for 7 weeks to protest SAIC's plans to lay off 554 employees. The strike cost SsangYong 380 billion Won and negotiations ended with workers accepting a wage freeze.

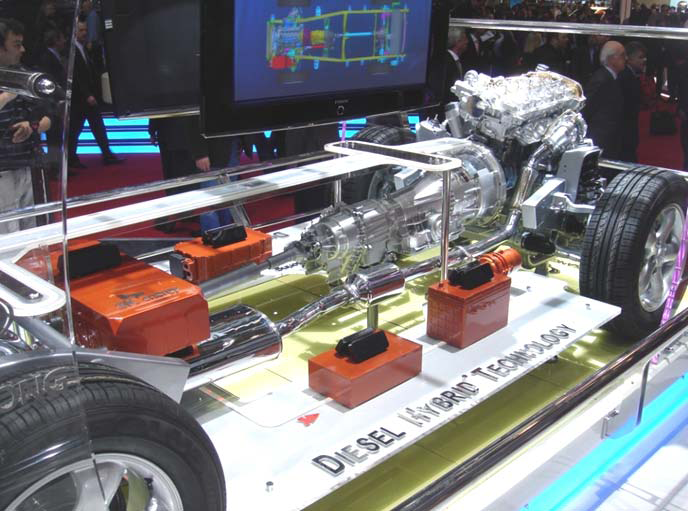
SsangYong's hybrid technology.

In January 2009, after recording a $75.42 million loss, the company was put into receivership. This may have been due to the global economic crisis and shrinking demand. In response to management's plan to cut 2,600 jobs, a third of the workforce, workers at Ssangyong's main factory stopped work and barricaded themselves inside in protest. One elderly worker died from a cerebral hemorrhage within the first 12 days. The strikes grew violent after water, food, electricity, and medicine were withheld from the strikers and police surrounded the building. Strikers threw Molotov cocktails at police while police used electroshock weapons and allegedly dropped corrosive chemicals on the strikers. On 14 August 2009, worker strikes finished at the SsangYong factory and production commenced again after 77 days of disruption. Company employees and analysts have also blamed SAIC for stealing technology related to hybrid vehicles from the company and failing to live up to its promise of continued investment. SAIC denied allegations of technology theft by the company's employees. However, SAIC was charged by the South Korean prosecutor's office for violating company regulations and the South Korean law when it ordered and carried out the transfer of SsangYong's proprietary technology developed with South Korean government funding over to SAIC researchers.

In 2010, Daewoo Motor Sales was dropped by General Motors. The long-time dealership partner then signed a deal with the SsangYong Motor Company to supply new vehicles to sell (specifically the Rodius, Chairman W and Chairman H), in return for the injection of ₩20,000,000,000 ($17.6 million) into the car maker still recovering from bankruptcy. The deal is non-exclusive, meaning SsangYong will also sell vehicles through private dealers.

==== Takeover by Mahindra Automotive ====
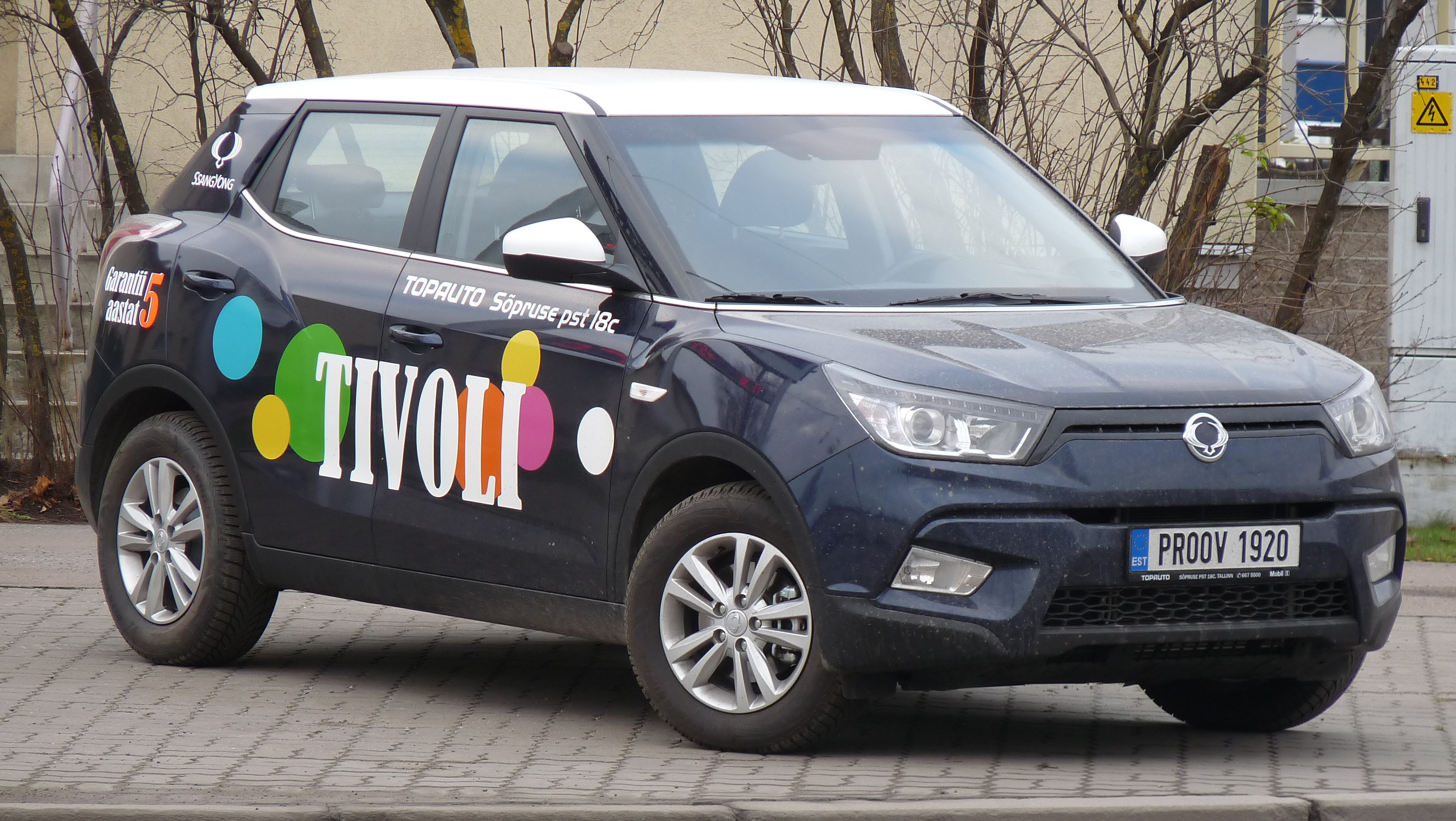
The Tivoli was SsangYong's first new model under Mahindra & Mahindra ownership

In April 2010, the company released a statement citing interest of three to four local and foreign companies in acquiring SsangYong Motor Company, resulting in shares rising by 15%. The companies were later revealed to be Mahindra & Mahindra, Ruia Group, SM Aluminum, Seoul Investments and French-owned Renault Samsung Motors of South Korea. In August 2010, Mahindra & Mahindra Limited was chosen as the preferred bidder for SsangYong. The acquisition was completed in February 2011 and cost Mahindra US$463.6 million.

In 2015, SsangYong and KB Capital established a joint venture as the financial affiliate of the former, with the name SY Auto Capital. SsangYong had a 51% stake of the venture and KB Capital a 49%. That year, the company launched the Tivoli, its first car after Mahindra acquisition. Within a year of Tivoli's launch, the company reported its first net profit in 9 years. In 2017, SsangYong sold 106,677 units in domestic sales and 37,008 units in exports, setting a record high in 14 years since 2003, when its annual domestic sales stood at 131,283 units. Out of this, the Tivoli alone contributed over 50,000 units of domestic sales for the company. Mahindra XUV300, which was later launched in 2019 is built on Tivoli's platform, sharing many parts including several metal sheets.

Mahindra also worked with its SsangYong subsidiary to introduce high performance electric vehicles in South Korea for mass-market sales. Mahindra and SsangYong increased their collaboration on engines and electric cars.

On 21 December 2020, SsangYong Motor filed for receivership after Mahindra cut funding to SsangYong due to its outstanding debt. Ssang Yong Motor spokesperson stated that the company owes a total of 315.3 billion won (US$285 million) in overdue debt to financial institutions.

==== Failed takeover by Edison Motors ====
In October 2021, it was reported that SsangYong was set to be acquired by electric bus and truck maker Edison Motors (not to be confused with Edison Motors of Canada) which would lead to SsangYong exiting receivership. Edison Motors planned to introduce SsangYong vehicles into the United States, Mexico, and Canada markets by the mid-2020s. Edison Motors also intended to phase-out production and new car sales of fossil fuel-powered SsangYong vehicles by 2030, in favor of producing and selling only electric-powered vehicles by the latter, if acquired. In January 2022, the South Korean courts "approved" Edison Motors' acquisition plan, although the company would be kept in receivership until the transaction were completed. In March 2022, SsangYong said the Edison Motors takeover was cancelled as the latter failed making acquisition payments for that month.

In December 2021, SsangYong signed an agreement with the Chinese BYD Auto to co-develop battery systems for its first electric car (called U100) which would be launched in 2023.

==== Takeover by the KG Group ====
In June 2022, the Seoul Bankruptcy Court opted for a consortium (KG Mobility) led by the KG Group as the final bidder to take over SsangYong Motor. The consortium planned to pay 900 billion won ($699.5 million) for SsangYong. In August 2022, South Korea's Free Trade Commission approved KG Group acquisition of a 61% majority stake in SsangYong through the consortium. The acquisition payments were completed later that month. In September 2022, the Seoul Bankruptcy Court agreed to SsangYong's receivership exit plan, including issuing new shares in order to pay the creditors. The KG Group was set to start the process to exit SsangYong's receivership in early October and finish the acquisition process on (or before) 14 October, the SsangYong sale deadline. There also were plans to rename SsangYong. After delays, the consortium started the receivership exit procedures on 31 October by requesting the receivership termination to the Seoul Bankruptcy Court. The Court approved the receivership exit on 11 November, finalising the consortium's acquisition.

In December 2022, SsangYong's chairman Kwak Jae-sun said it planned to remove the "SsangYong" name entirely in March 2023 by modifying the articles of association. The company was set to be renamed as "KG Mobility", adopting a new branding and using KG as its marque, to avoid the negative perception of the present name, bypassing its "painful image".

=== KG Mobility (2023–present) ===
The company adopted the name KG Mobility in March 2023. As the company was renamed, its financial affiliate, SY Auto Capital, was also renamed as KG Capital. In May 2023, KG Group's KG Inicis acquired the 49% KG Capital stake hold by KB Capital and 6% of KG Mobility's share, leaving the latter with a 45% and KG Inicis with a 55%.

The company is developing plans to use technology to gain competitivity on various market segments (especially electric) and enter less developed overseas markets with potential growth (such as Africa, Southeast Asia, South America, or the Middle East) to expand its sales base. In 2022, the company signed a knock-down kit (KD) assembly contract with the Saudi National Automotive Manufacturing Company. In January 2023, it signed another KD contract with NGT, a company from the United Arab Emirates. In March 2023, a third with Vietnamese Kim Long Motors.

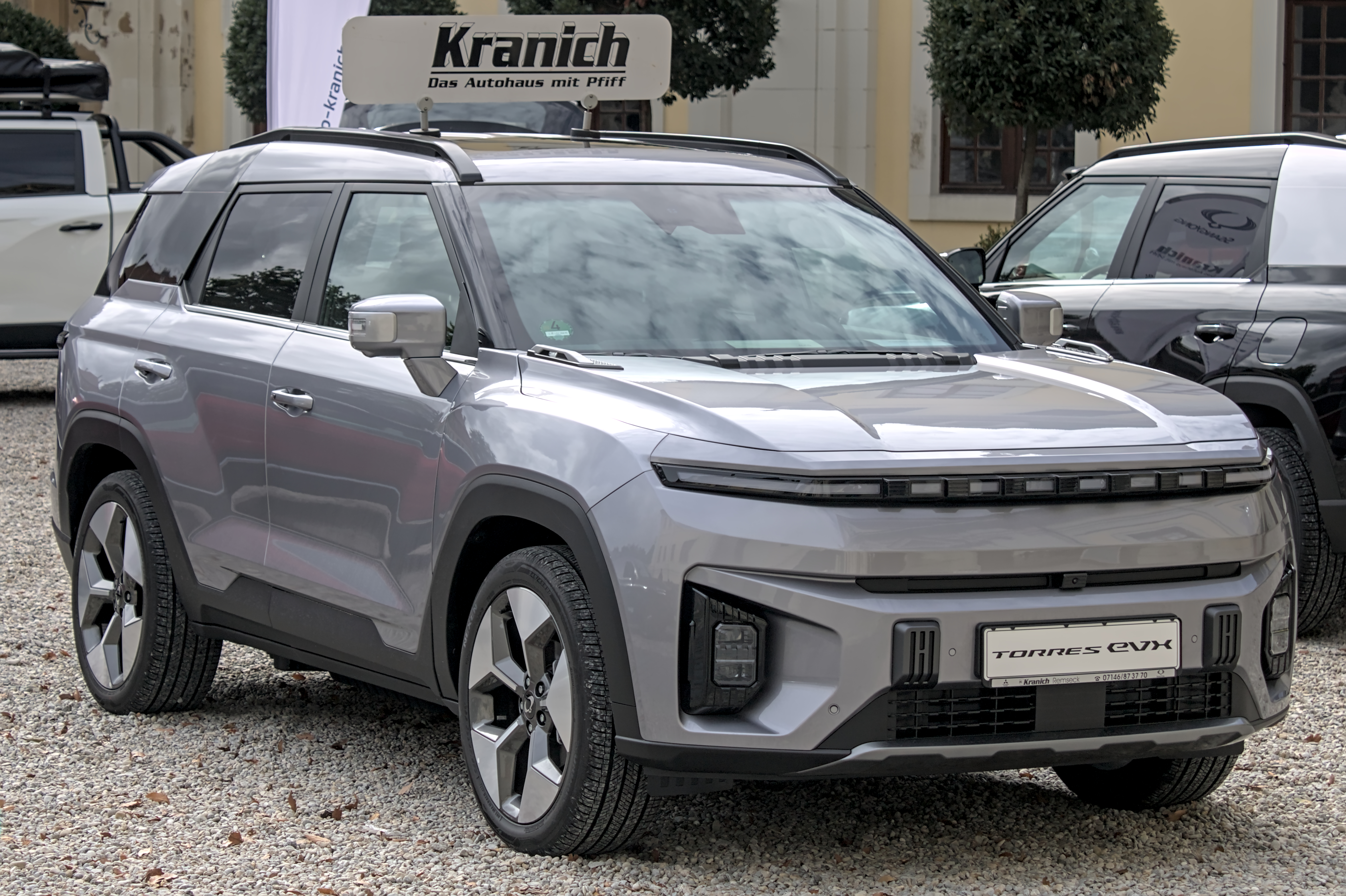
KGM Torres EVX electric car

In March 2023, KG Mobility launched a bid to acquire receivership-bound Edison Motors. In May, it was selected as the preferred bidder. In June, it was reported that SsangYong would be relaunched in Europe under the name KGM, with the cars continuing to wear SsangYong's dragon wing logo on the front. It is thought that the first KGM car in Europe will be a facelifted version of the SsangYong Tivoli, with their range of SUVs being rebranded soon after.

In April 2023, KG Mobility launched KG S&C, a vehicle parts and conversion division.

In November 2023, it was announced that the Korean Intellectual Property Office (KIPO) had rejected the application to register the brand name because it had already been registered in around 30 countries by Cihan Turan. This company is known as a trademark troll. This refers to the registration of brand names without the intention of actually using them, but only in order to exploit the rights and collect the corresponding payments. KG Mobility appealed against this decision and said it would continue to use the KGM name in overseas markets until further notice.

In June 2024, however, The Korea Times reported that KG Mobility was facing difficulties in obtaining the trademark rights for the three-letter abbreviation "KGM". The Turkish Patent and Trademark Office even refused the registration of KGM, because the Turkish government-run General Directorate of Highways, which is written as "Karayolları Genel Müdürlüğü" in Turkish, had been already using the same acronym. The registration of KG Mobility had also been rejected in the country due to Cihan Turan. Even in Korea, the trademark for KGM is also under KIPO's review, following an objection filed in 2023 by KTM, an Austrian motorcycle manufacturer, which claims consumers are likely to be confused by the two similar acronyms.

In August 2024, KG Mobility said it has established a sales subsidiary in Germany to strengthen its operations in the European market.

In October 2024, KG Mobility announced that it has signed a strategic partnership co-operation agreement with China's Chery Automobile.

In August 2026, KG Mobility announced plans to enter the local market with the Myanmar automaker SSS Group. They explained that through this expansion, they plan to extend their business to major countries such as Saudi Arabia and Vietnam.

== Corporate ==
=== Ownership ===
By April 2023, the controlling shareholder of KG Mobility was KG Mobility Holdings, a wholly owned subsidiary of KG ETS (a KG Group affiliate). In August 2023, KG Mobility Holdings was merged into KG ETS, making KG Mobility a direct subsidiary of the latter. KG ETS holds a 58.84% of KG Mobility and it cannot sell its stake to third parties until April 2026.

=== Facilities ===
==== Offices ====
- Head Office – The Head office located in Pyeongtaek, South Korea. R&D Centre, Design Centre, and other departments are located in the Pyeongtaek office
- Seoul Office – Department under Head office is located in Yeoksam-dong, Seoul

==== Factories ====
- Pyeongtaek Plant (South Korea) – Main factory. Produces a complete range.
- Changwon Plant (South Korea) – Engine and parts factory.

The present main (assembly) site is located in Pyeongtaek's Chilgoe neighbourhood and was built in 1979. The whole site (including surrounding land) covers 850,000 m^{2} (9,100,000 sq ft) and also includes the aforementioned headquarters and research and development buildings. In 2021, the company started the review process to move the factory elsewhere. In September 2023, it said it plans to sell the present site's land to finance the construction of a new factory in the Pyeongtaek city area, which is set to start in 2024. The new factory is set to have capacity to assemble up to 300,000 vehicles per year in a more integrated way (avoiding the production bottlenecks of the present, older style facility). The new factory would be fully operational by 2028.

== Leadership ==
- Ha Dong-hwan (1954–1979)
- Chung Ki-young (1979–1982)
- Kim Dong-ho (1982–1984)
- Jang Doo-seop (1984–1986)
- Choi Byung-hang (1986–1987)
- Son Myung-won (1987–1993 and 1995–1997)
- Kim Suk-Joon (1994–1995)
- Lee Jong-kyu (1997–1998)
- Park Dong-kyu (1998–1999)
- Choi Gye-yong (1999–2000)
- So Jing-wan (2000–2005)
- Choi Hyung-tak (2005–2009)
- Lee Yoo-il (2009–2015)
- Choi Johng-sik (2015–2019)
- Byung-tae Yea (2019–2021)
- Jeong Yong-won (2022–2024)
- Hwang Ki-young and Park Jang-ho (2024–present)

== Production models ==
Model			Current generation		Vehicle description
Image	Name	Introduction (cal. year)	Model code	Introduction	Vehicle description
SUV/crossover
	Actyon	2005	J120	2024	Mid-size Crossover based on the KGM Torres.
	Korando	1983	C300	2019	Compact crossover SUV, Formerly the SsangYong Korando.
	Korando e-Motion	2022	C300	2019	Battery electric crossover based on the Korando.
	Rexton	2001	Y400	2017	Mid-size crossover SUV, Formerly the SsangYong Rexton.
	Tivoli	2015	X100	2015	Subcompact crossover SUV, Formerly the SsangYong Tivoli.
	Tivoli XLV	2016	X100	2015	Extended version of the Tivoli, Formerly the SsangYong Tivoli XLV.
	Torres	2022	J100	2022	Mid-size crossover SUV, Formerly the SsangYong Torres.
	Torres EVX	2023	U100	2023	Battery electric crossover based on the Torres.
Pickup truck
	Musso Sports	2002	Q300	2026	Mid-size pickup truck, Formerly the SsangYong Musso Pick-up.
	Musso EV	2025	O100	2025	Battery electric Mid-size pickup truck.

== Former SsangYong model lineup ==
Name	Production	Notes	Image
SUVs
Actyon	2005–2016	Replaced the old Korando	
Kyron	2005–2015	SsangYong's first model under SAIC ownership, replaced by Torres	
Musso	1993–2006	Replaced by the Kyron	
Korando Family	1988–1998	Based on the Isuzu Trooper	
Pickup trucks
Musso Sports	2002–2006	Replaced by the Actyon Sports	
Actyon Sports	2006–2017	Replaced the Musso Sports; also known as Korando Sports from 2012	
Vans
Istana	1995–2003 (South Korea) 2003–2014 (China)	Badge Engineered variant of the Mercedes-Benz MB140	
Rodius/Stavic	2004–2019	Also known as Korando Turismo in South Korea.	
Luxury cars
Chairman W	2008–2017	Was sold alongside the Chairman H	
Chairman H	1997–2014	Based on the Mercedes-Benz E-Class (W210)	
Kallista	1991–1994	Rebadged Panther Kallista	
Trucks and buses
DA Truck		Based on Nissan Diesel Truck	
SY Truck	1993–1998	Based on Mercedes-Benz SK	
Transstar	1990–2002	Based on Mercedes-Benz buses	
