= Phoenix Motorcars =

California electric vehicle company

Phoenix Cars LLC

- Headquarters in Anaheim, CA
- Trade name: Phoenix Motorcars
- Type: Startup
- Industry: Automotive
- Founded: 2002
- Headquarters: Anaheim, California
- Area served: United States
- Key people: Xiaofeng "Denton" Peng (Chairman and CEO)
- Website: http://www.phoenixmotorcars.com

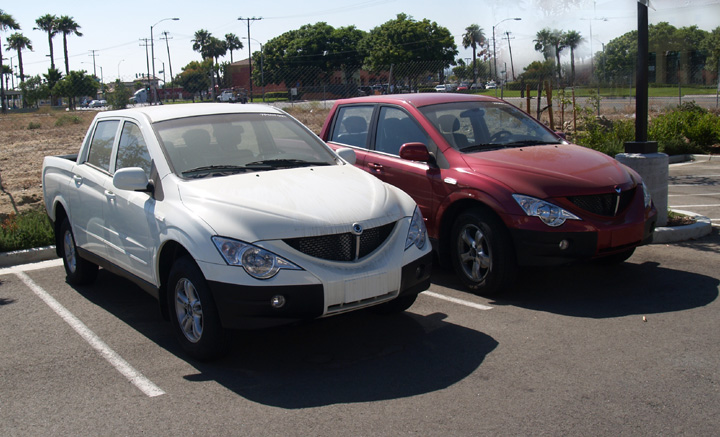
Phoenix SUT

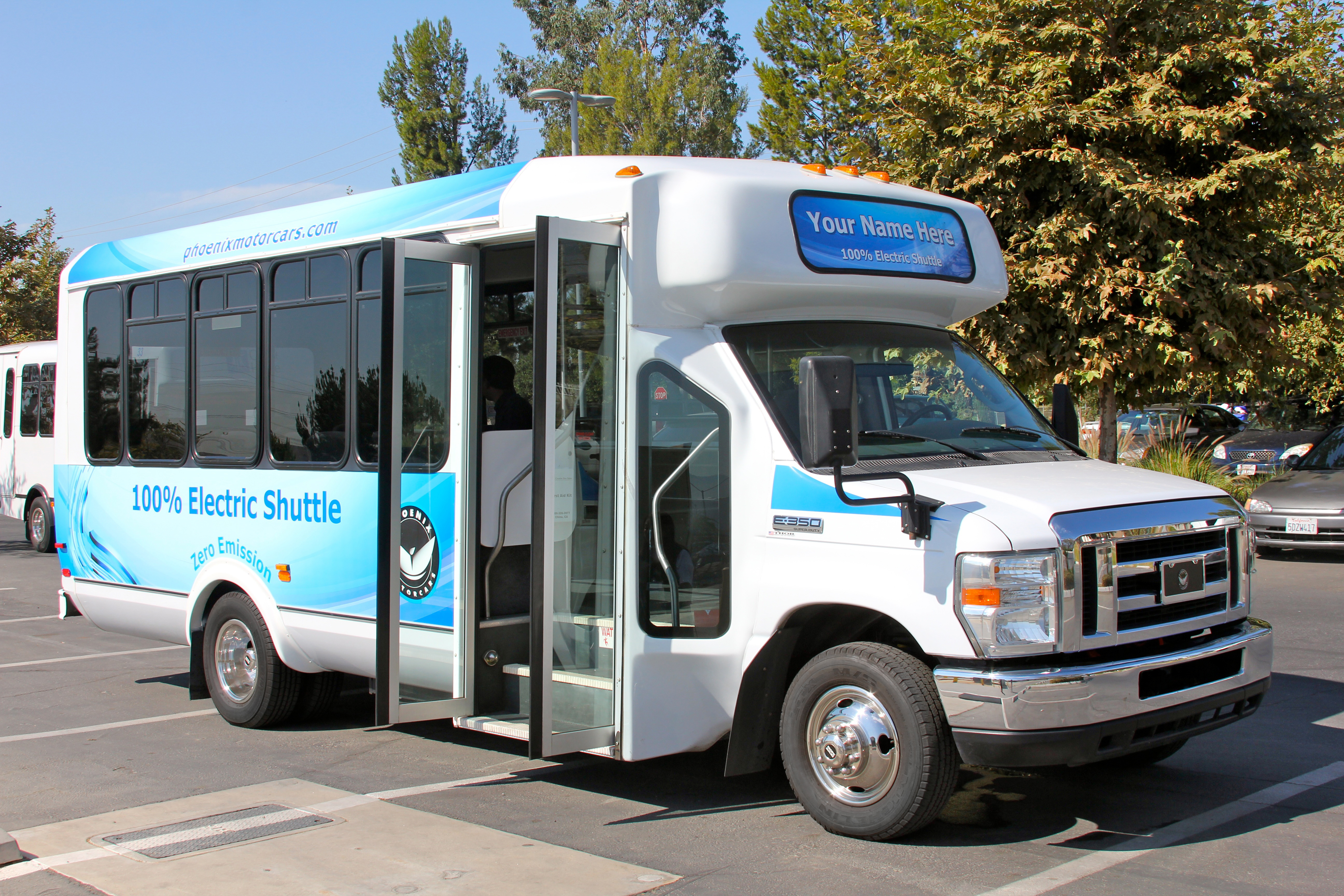
Phoenix Motorcars Shuttle-ZEUS Ontario, CA

Flatbed Truck charging at Phoenix Headquarters Ontario, CA

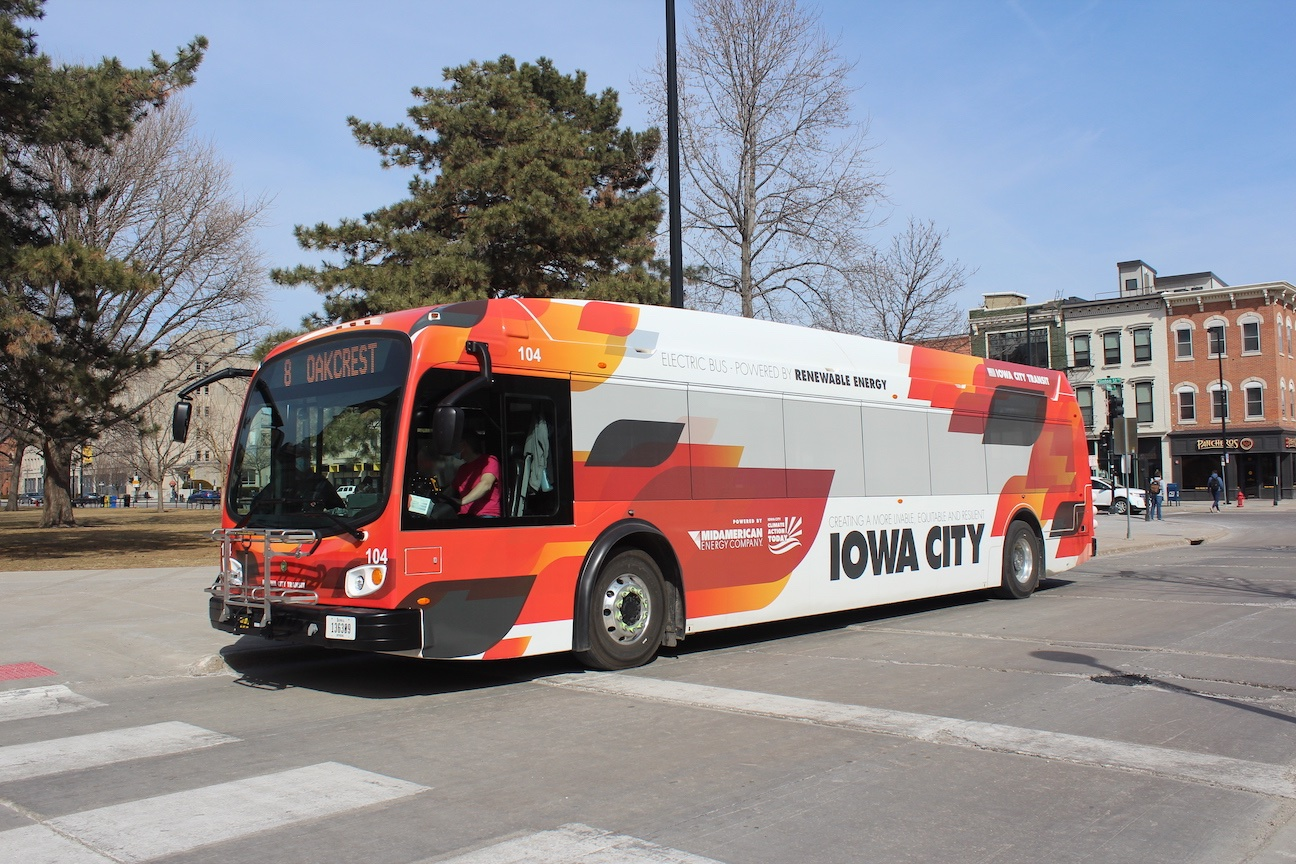
ZX5 bus

Phoenix Cars LLC, d.b.a. Phoenix Motorcars, is a developer of zero emission, all-electric vehicles (EV) based in Anaheim, California, United States, focused on the deployment of light- and medium-duty EVs into the fleet and transit markets. The company was founded in 2002 and became a wholly owned subsidiary of Al Yousuf LLC in 2009 and of EdisonFuture in 2020. Phoenix launched its all-electric 14-22 passenger shuttle bus with 100 mile range per charge in 2013. The bus is based on the versatile Ford E350/450 Series vehicle.

In November 2023, Phoenix acquired the electric transit bus division (see Proterra ZX5) and associated battery leases of bankrupt bus company Proterra for $10M; Volvo bought the battery business proper.

== Restructuring and financing ==
On March 19, 2008, Phoenix Motorcars announced that it had completed a financing and restructuring, with Dubai, United Arab Emirates-Al Yousuf LLC, and Arlington, Virginia-based AES Corporation, as new investors, the departure of the Phoenix Motorcars’ original founders and the appointment of a new board of directors.

In mid-2010, Al Yousuf LLC closed on a deal with AES Corporation that enabled Phoenix Motorcars to become a wholly owned subsidiary of Al Yousuf LLC. This led to another restructuring of Phoenix Motorcars in less than 2 years, with the company switching its focus to its 3rd generation drive system targeted for buses and trucks on the Ford E350/E450 cutaway chassis.

== Production ==
=== Zero Emission Utility Shuttle – ZEUS ===
Phoenix launched its third product in 2013, an all-electric 14-22 passenger shuttle bus with 100-mile range per charge.

This product achieved California Air Resources Board (CARB) certification in July, 2014 in the 10,001–14,000 pound GVWR range. Along with its 100-mile range per charge, the ZEUS shuttle is capable of rapid charging via CHAdeMO or SAE standards. As of 2020 they were working with a number of Southern California airports to replace shuttles with their Zeus model.

Phoenix Motor Inc. recently announced that the United States Patent and Trademark Office has issued a new U.S. utility patent covering cutting edge low-floor electric bus architecture and integrated battery system design.

=== Electric Flatbed Truck ===
Phoenix launched its electric Flatbed in 2015, which is also based on the Ford E350/450 Series, with 100 mile range per charge.

=== ZX5 electric bus ===
The ZX5 battery electric bus is built at the former Proterra plant in Greenville, South Carolina. Then, the National Highway Traffic Safety Administration issued a recall on September 5, 2024 for ZX5's produced from 2019-2022 on reports of smoke, software, and electrical related issues.
