= Proterra ZX5 =

American battery electric transit bus

ZX5 Transit Bus
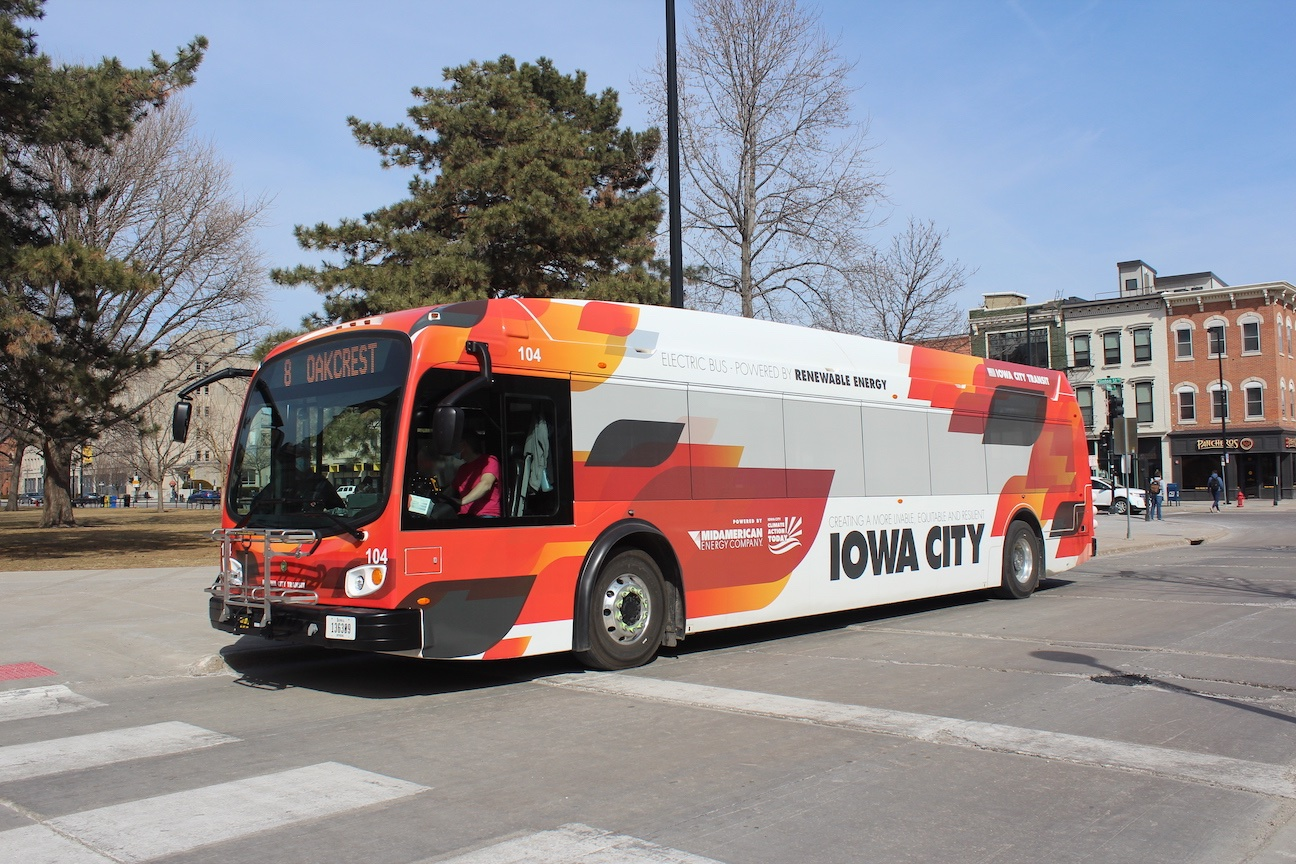

Overview
- Manufacturer: Phoenix Motorcars (Proterra until 2023)
- Production: 2020–present

Body and chassis
- Class: Transit bus
- Body style: Monocoque stressed skin
- Layout: Rear-motor, rear-wheel-drive

Powertrain
- Electric motor: 2×Parker Hannifin GVM310 (DuoPower); UQM Technologies HD250 (ProDrive); Eaton 4-speed (ProDrive2.0)
- Transmission: Eaton EEV-7202; Eaton 4-speed (ProDrive 2.0)
- Battery: 738 kWh
- Plug-in charging: 370 kW

Dimensions
- Wheelbase: 40': 296 in (7.5 m); 35': 243 in (6.2 m)
- Length: 40': 42 ft 6 in (12.95 m); 35': 36 ft 11 in (11.25 m)
- Width: 102 in (2.59 m)
- Height: 128 in (3.25 m)
- Curb weight: 40': 26,649 to 33,350 lb (12,088 to 15,127 kg); 35': 26,358 to 29,858 lb (11,956 to 13,543 kg)

Chronology
- Predecessor: Proterra Catalyst

The Proterra ZX5 is a battery-electric, low-floor transit bus, originally released by Proterra in 2020. Since late 2023, following the bankruptcy of Proterra, it has been manufactured by Phoenix Motorcars.

== History ==
On September 15, 2020, Proterra announced the ZX5 available in 35-and-40-foot (10.7 and 12.2 m) lengths as a replacement for the Proterra Catalyst. The Edmonton Transit System in Edmonton, Alberta was the launch customer for the 40-foot ZX5. In November 2020, Southern Teton Area Rapid Transit (START) in Jackson, Wyoming, showed eight ZX5 buses, the first launch of the model in the United States. The agency used Proterra's battery leasing program to minimize upfront purchase cost.

== Background ==
=== Design changes ===
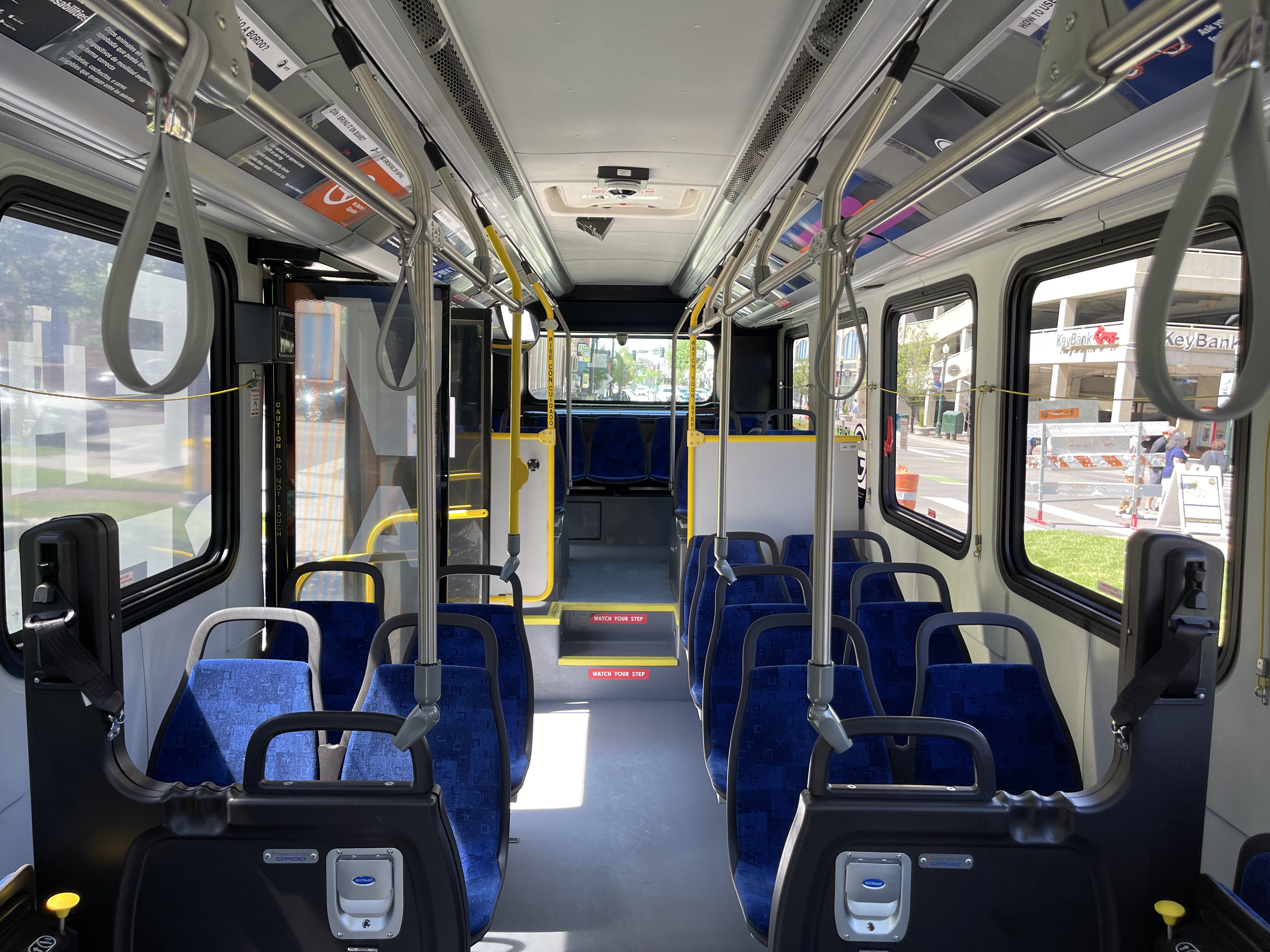
The interior of a Valley Regional Transit ZX5

The ZX5 is built using the same composite structure as the Catalyst, consisting of fiberglass with a balsa-core sandwich construction, with minor changes to the roof to accommodate a roof-mounted charging rail and battery. Inside the bus, the roof is 6 inches (150 millimetres) shorter than other buses to allow for the charging capabilities.

The ZX5 comes available in three different battery capacities:

- ZX5 (220 kWh): With a stated range of 232 and 240 miles (373 to 386 kilometres) of range.
- ZX5+ (440 kWh): With a stated range of 232 and 240 miles (373 to 386 kilometres) of range.
- ZX5 MAX (660 kWh): (Only available in 40 ft variant) With a stated range of up to 329 miles (529 kilometres) of range.

Each ZX5 battery capacity is offered with either two Parker Hannifin GVM310 electric motors (DuoPower), or a single UQM Technologies HD250 (ProDrive) motor.

DuoPower models use two independent 205 kW (275 hp) motors, with an energy consumption equivalent of 13.9 to 25.1 mpg-e (242 to 134 kW⋅h/100 mi), though the mileage depends on battery and body length.

ProDrive models use a single 250 kW (340 hp) motor with slightly lower equivalent efficiency, from 13.5 to 23.5 mpg‑e (250 to 143 kW⋅h/100 mi).

Curb weights range between 26,358 to 29,858 lb (11,956 to 13,543 kg) for the 35-foot models and between 26,649 to 33,350 lb (12,088 to 15,127 kg) for 40-foot models with ProDrive models being approximately 200 lb (91 kg) heavier than their DuoPower equivalents.

In 2022, Proterra introduced an updated ProDrive 2.0 which pairs the motor with a four-speed transmission from Eaton with electric shifting.

In August of 2023, Proterra declared bankruptcy. During this period, the bus manufacturing division of the company was purchased by Phoenix Motorcars, which now produces the ZX5.

=== Charging ===
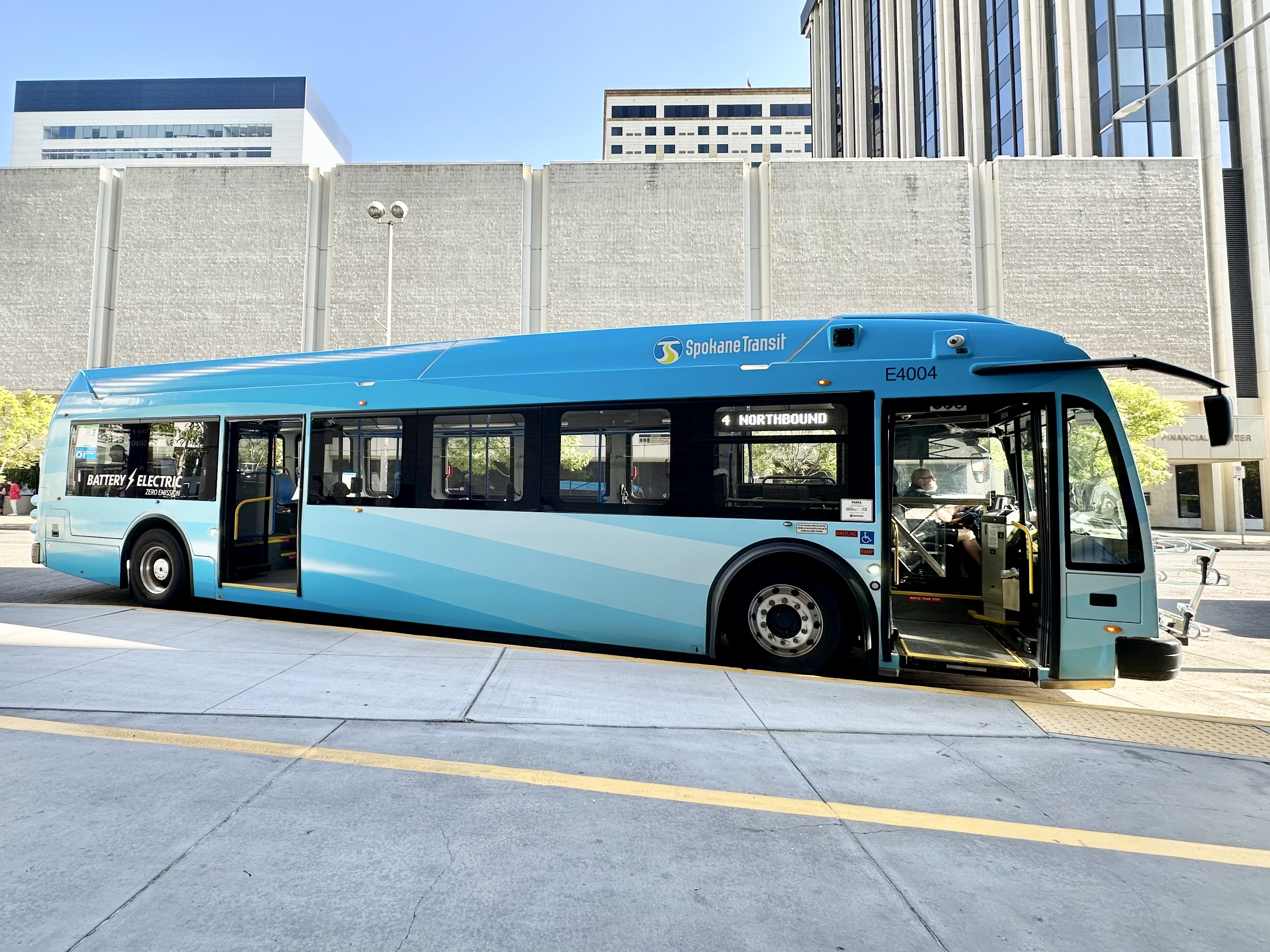
Spokane Transit Authority ZX5 right side profile

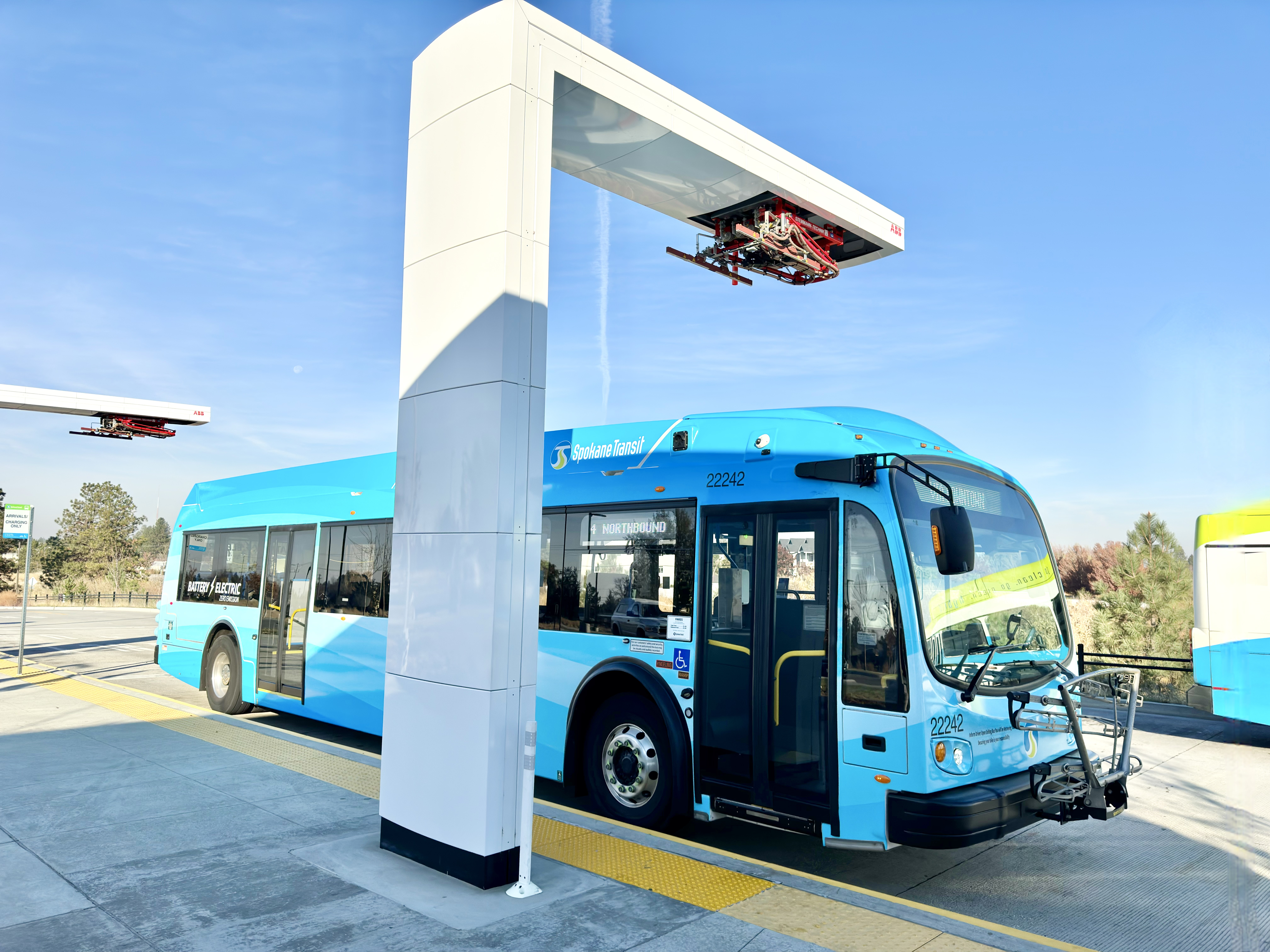
Spokane Transit Authority ZX5 preparing to charge via overhead SAE J3105 pantograph

The ZX5 is charged using the SAE J3105 (OppCharge) overhead charging protocol while stopped on a layover (opportunity charging), or with a plug-in J1772 CCS DC fast charger when parked in a storage yard.

With any battery option, the ZX5 may be fully charged in about 2.9 hours using the OppCharge system, which offers a maximum charging rate of 330 kW. With plug-in charging, the standard ZX5 takes around 2.9 hours to fully charge, while the ZX5 MAX takes around 4.7 hours to fully charge at a more limited rate of 132 kW. One CCS charge port is standard at the rear curbside corner and an additional CCS port can be added either at the front curbside or rear streetside corner.
