= KGM Actyon =

Mid-size crossover SUV

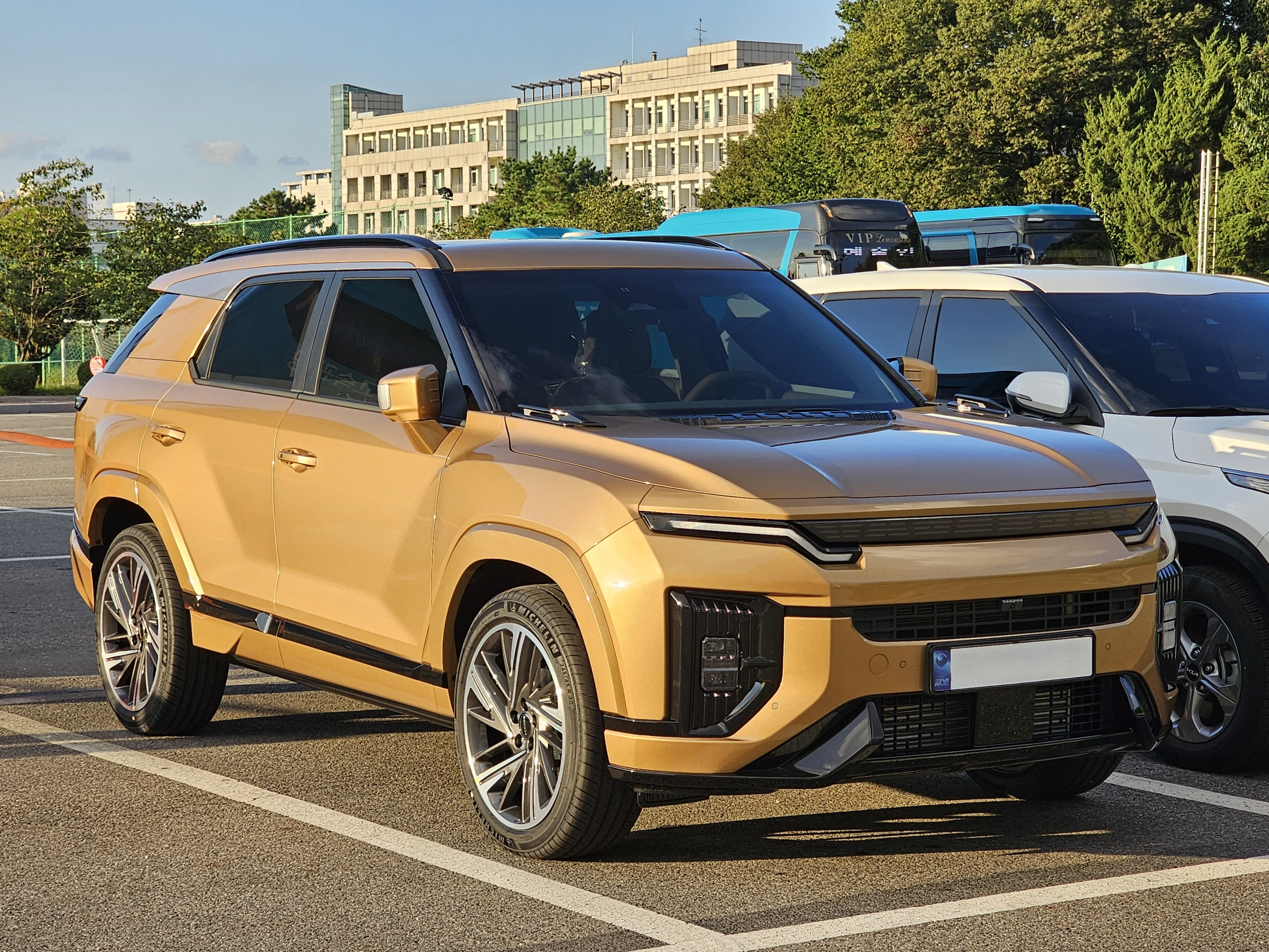

Overview
- Manufacturer: KGM
- Model code: J120
- Production: 2024–present
- Assembly: South Korea: Pyeongtaek, Gyeonggi

Body and chassis
- Class: Mid-size SUV
- Body style: 5-door coupe SUV
- Layout: Front-engine, front-wheel-drive; Front-engine, all-wheel-drive
- Related: KGM Torres

Powertrain
- Engine: Petrol: 1.5 L e-XGi150T T-GDI I4
- Power output: 170 PS (168 hp; 125 kW)
- Transmission: 6-speed automatic

Dimensions
- Wheelbase: 2,680 mm (105.5 in)
- Length: 4,740 mm (186.6 in)
- Width: 1,920 mm (75.6 in)
- Height: 1,680 mm (66.1 in)

Chronology
- Predecessor: SsangYong Actyon

The KGM Actyon (Korean: KGM 액티언) is a mid-size SUV produced by KG Mobility since 2024. Introduced in July 2024, the Actyon and Torres have the same platform, with some design alterations which makes it longer, wider, and lower than the Torres.

== Background ==
The vehicle inherits its name from the SsangYong Actyon, an amalgam of the words "action" and "young". The SsangYong Actyon is a coupe SUV that was released in 2005 and discontinued in 2010. Then, 14 years after the discontinuation, KGM introduced a new Actyon in 2024. It was built on Torres' platform.

== Design ==
The hood and bumper feature daytime running lights in the Geon-Gon-Gam-Ri pattern of Taegukgi. The rear end features an integrated skid plate bumper. The interior features a panoramic display that integrates a 12.3-inch cluster and a 12.3-inch infotainment system, and is tilted 8 degrees toward the driver.

== Markets ==
=== Australia ===
The Actyon was launched in Australia on 29 May 2025, it is available with two variants: K50 and K60.

=== Europe ===
The Actyon was launched in Poland on 29 January 2025.

=== South Korea ===
The number of pre-orders for the Actyon in the South Korean market is 16,000 units on the first day and 55,000 units on the last day.

=== Middle East ===
KGM Actyon gained early recognition by securing second place in the Upper-Mid Size SUV category of Egy Car Annual Poll 2025.

== Gallery ==
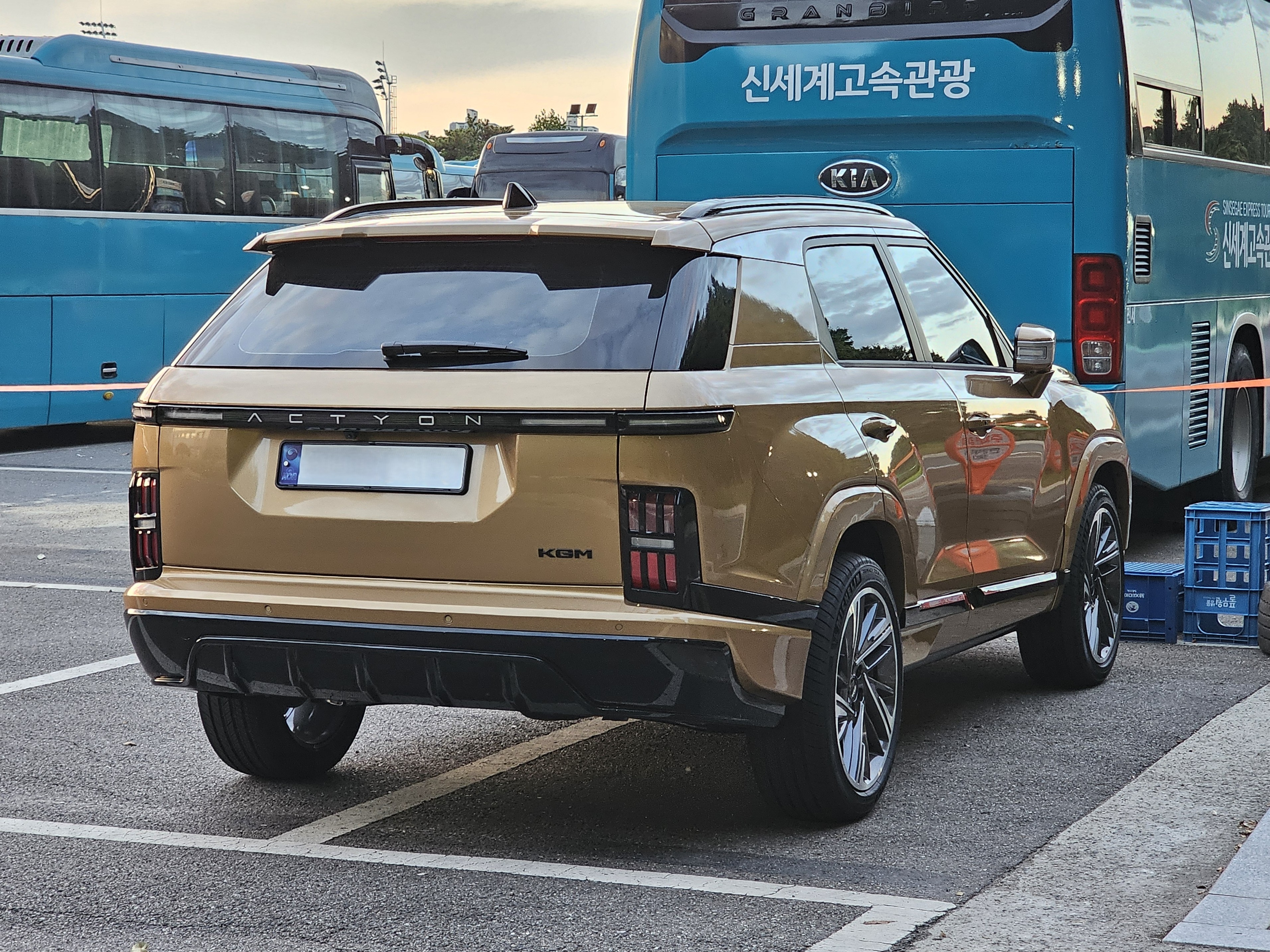
Rear view

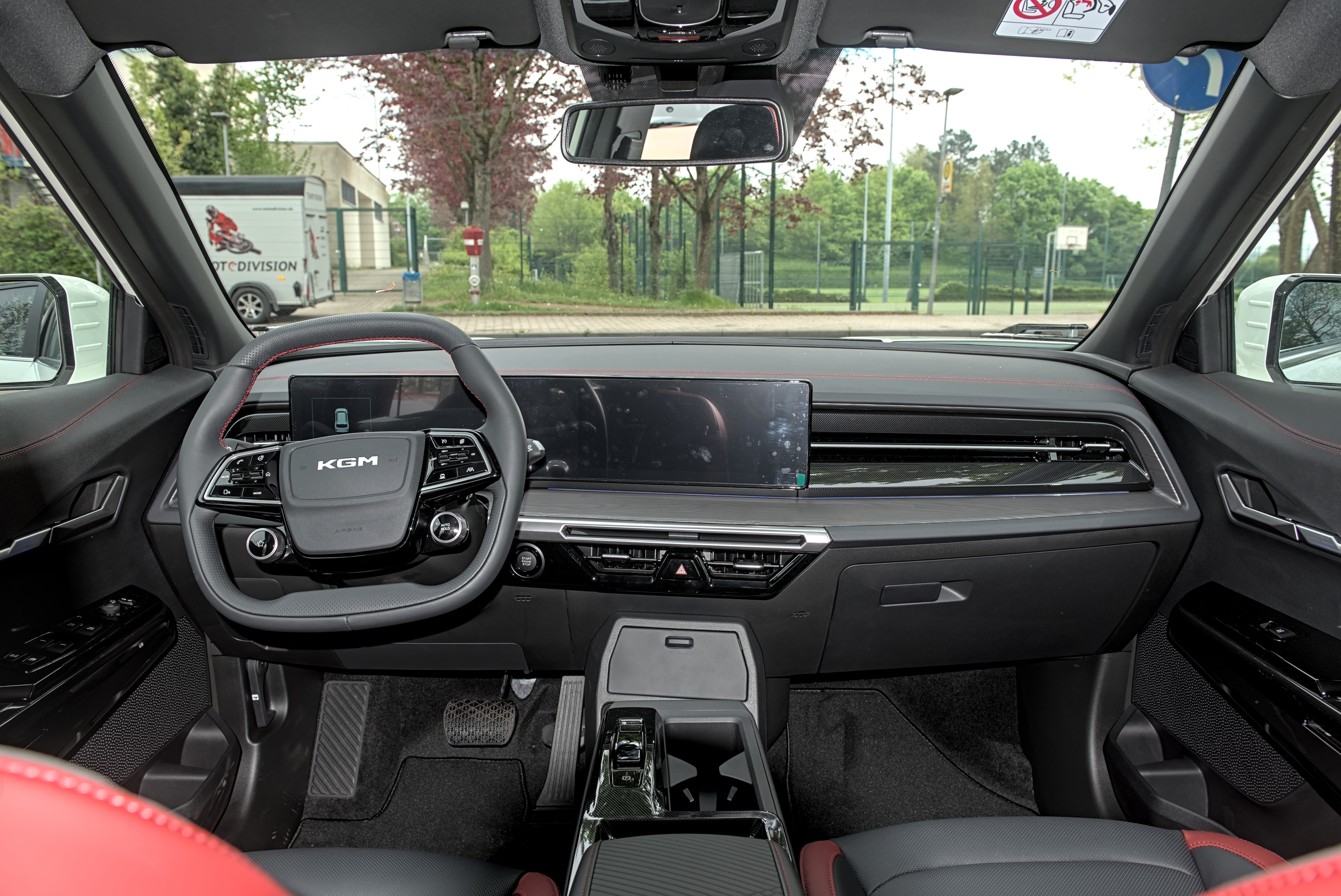
Interior
