= SsangYong Transstar =

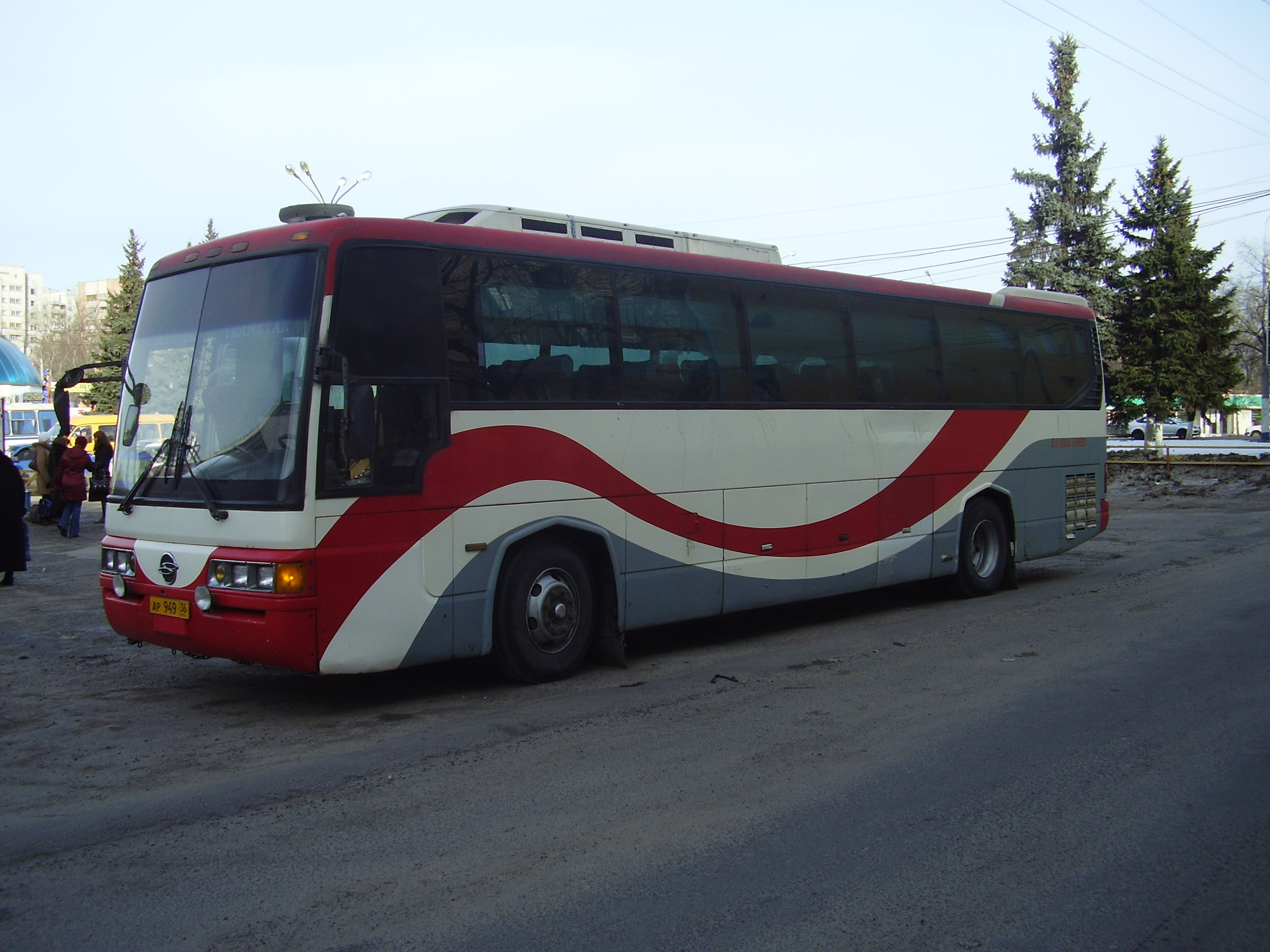
- SsangYong Transstar in Voronezh, Russia.

Overview
- Manufacturer: SsangYong Motor Company
- Production: 1994–1998

Body and chassis
- Class: Single-decker coach
- Doors: 1 door
- Floor type: Step entrance

Powertrain
- Capacity: 45+1 driver
- Transmission: Manual

Dimensions
- Length: 11960mm
- Width: 2490mm
- Height: 3450mm
- Curb weight: 12060kg

Chronology
- Predecessor: SsangYong Hyper Aero

The SsangYong Transstar (Korean: 쌍용 트랜스타) is a luxury coach made using components derived from Mercedes-Benz buses. It is available in three trim levels: luxury express bus, express bus and tourist express bus. The bus is very popular in South Korea and former Soviet nations. The name "Transstar" comes from the words "transportation" and "star".

== History ==
SsangYong started development on the Transstar in 1991. The development lasted for three years and had total cost of 20 billion won.
