= KGM Torres =

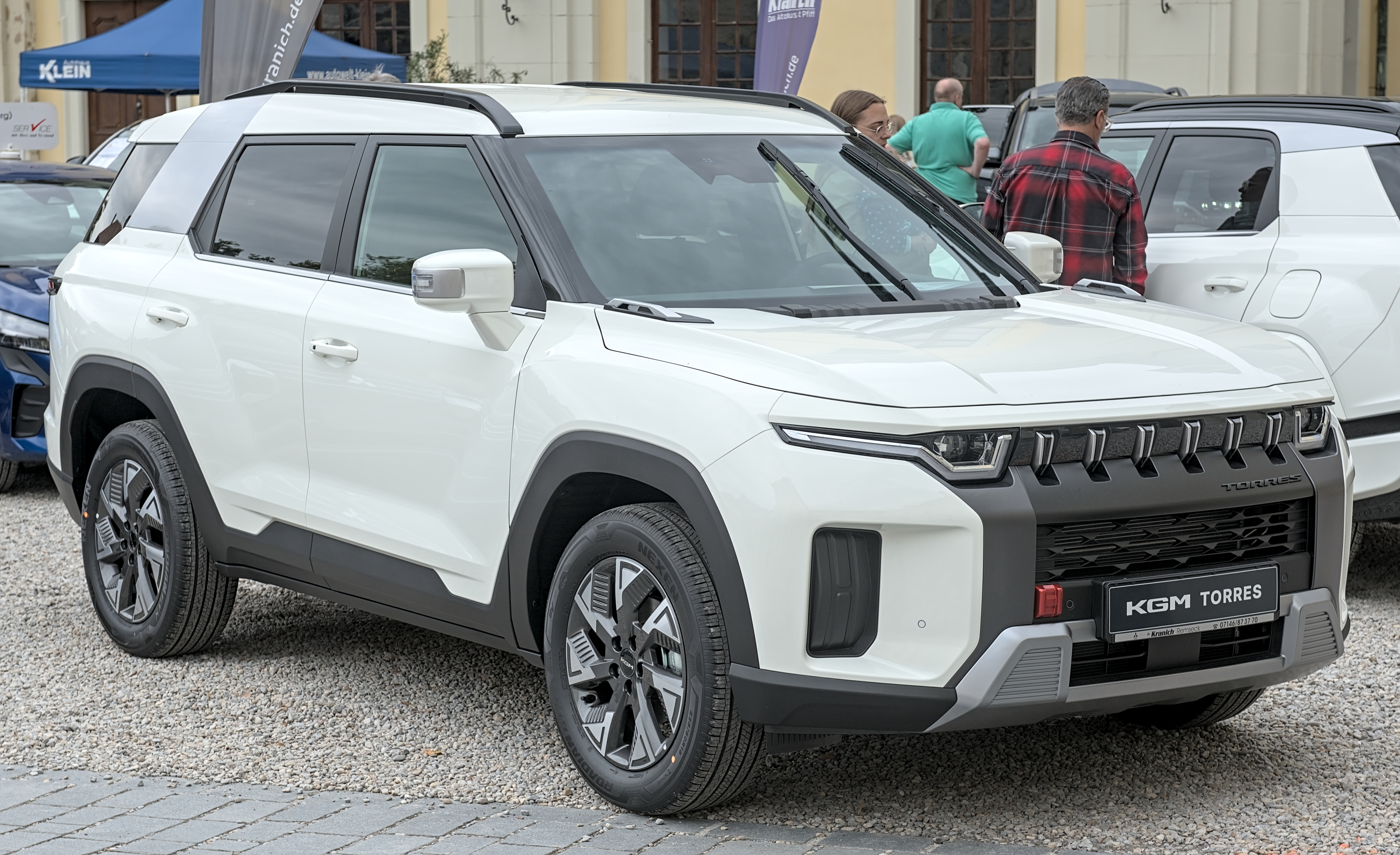

Overview
- Manufacturer: SsangYong Motor (2022–2023); KGM (2023–present)
- Model code: J100; U100 (EVX)
- Also called: SsangYong Torres (2022–2023); SsangYong Actyon Torres (Colombia)
- Production: 2022–present
- Assembly: South Korea: Pyeongtaek, Gyeonggi

Body and chassis
- Class: Mid-size SUV
- Body style: 5-door crossover SUV
- Layout: ICE; Front-engine, front-wheel-drive; Front-engine, all-wheel-drive; EV; Front-motor, front-wheel-drive
- Related: KGM Actyon

Powertrain
- Engine: Petrol: 1.5 L e-XGi150T T-GDI I4; Petrol hybrid: 1.5 L T-GDI I4
- Power output: 170 PS (168 hp; 125 kW); 204 PS (201 hp; 150 kW) (hybrid); 204 PS (201 hp; 150 kW) (EVX)
- Transmission: 6-speed automatic; e-DHT (hybrid)
- Battery: 1.83 kWh Li-NCM (hybrid); 73.4 kWh LFP FinDreams (EVX)
- Range: 500 km (310 mi) (WLTP)

Dimensions
- Wheelbase: 2,680 mm (105.5 in)
- Length: 4,700 mm (185.0 in); 4,715 mm (185.6 in) (EVX)
- Width: 1,890 mm (74.4 in)
- Height: 1,720 mm (67.7 in); 1,725 mm (67.9 in) (EVX)
- Curb weight: 1,520–1,610 kg (3,351.0–3,549.4 lb)

Chronology
- Predecessor: SsangYong Kyron

The KGM Torres (Korean: KGM 토레스, 쌍용 토레스), formerly known as SsangYong Torres, is a mid-size SUV produced by KG Mobility (previously SsangYong Motor) since 2022. Sharing the same platform with the Korando, the model is positioned between the Korando and Rexton and features a rugged off-road styling. It was released in June 2022, while a battery electric variant was released in 2023 with planned exports to Europe. It is the last model under the brand that was developed by Mahindra before SsangYong was sold to KG Group.

== First generation (J100; 2022) ==
The vehicle is named after the Torres del Paine National Park in the Chilean Patagonia, South America.

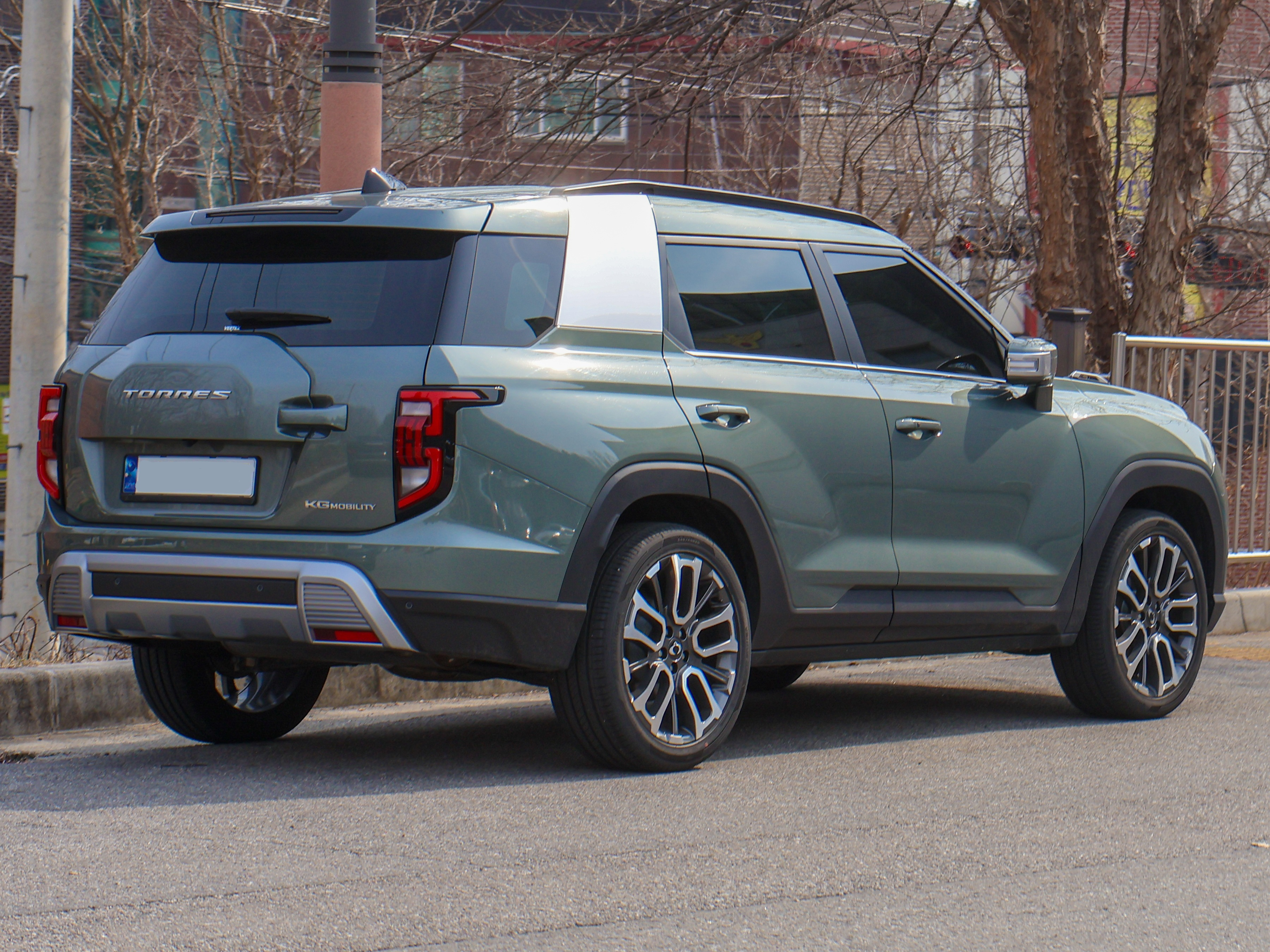
Rear view

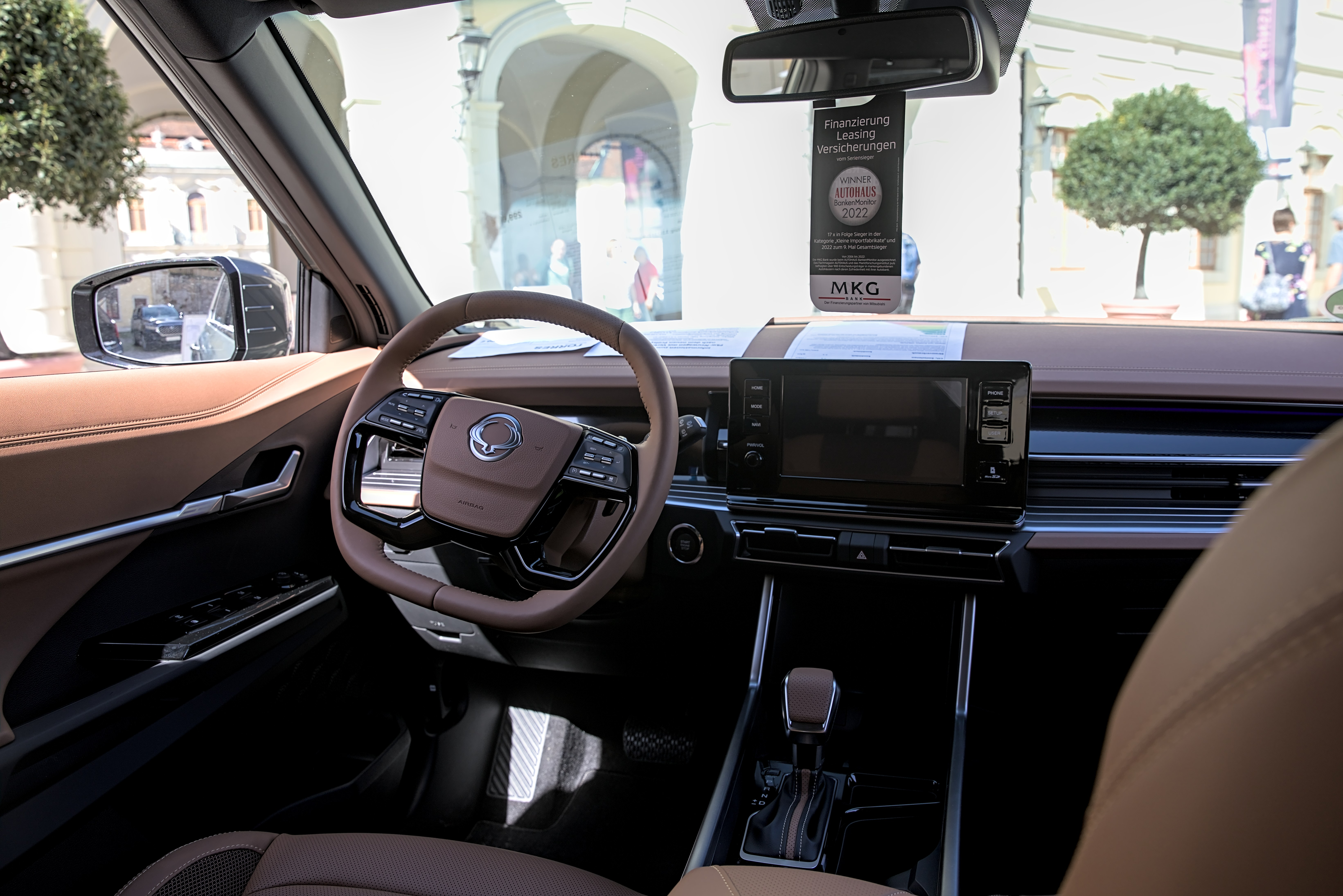
Interior

== Torres EVX (U100; 2023) ==
The Torres EVX (known in development as the U100 project) is the electric version of the Torres, which debuted on March 30 at the 2023 Seoul Motor Show alongside a large number of concepts and production models, being the first KG-branded vehicle after the general name change of SsangYong to KG Mobility.

The model looks different from its ICE-powered counterpart thanks to a redesigned front fascia, which is an evolution of the 'Powered by Toughness' design language specific to electric vehicles. The KG Torres EVX received a dedicated cockpit design with a floating panel of screens and the lack of connection between the armrest and the dashboard.

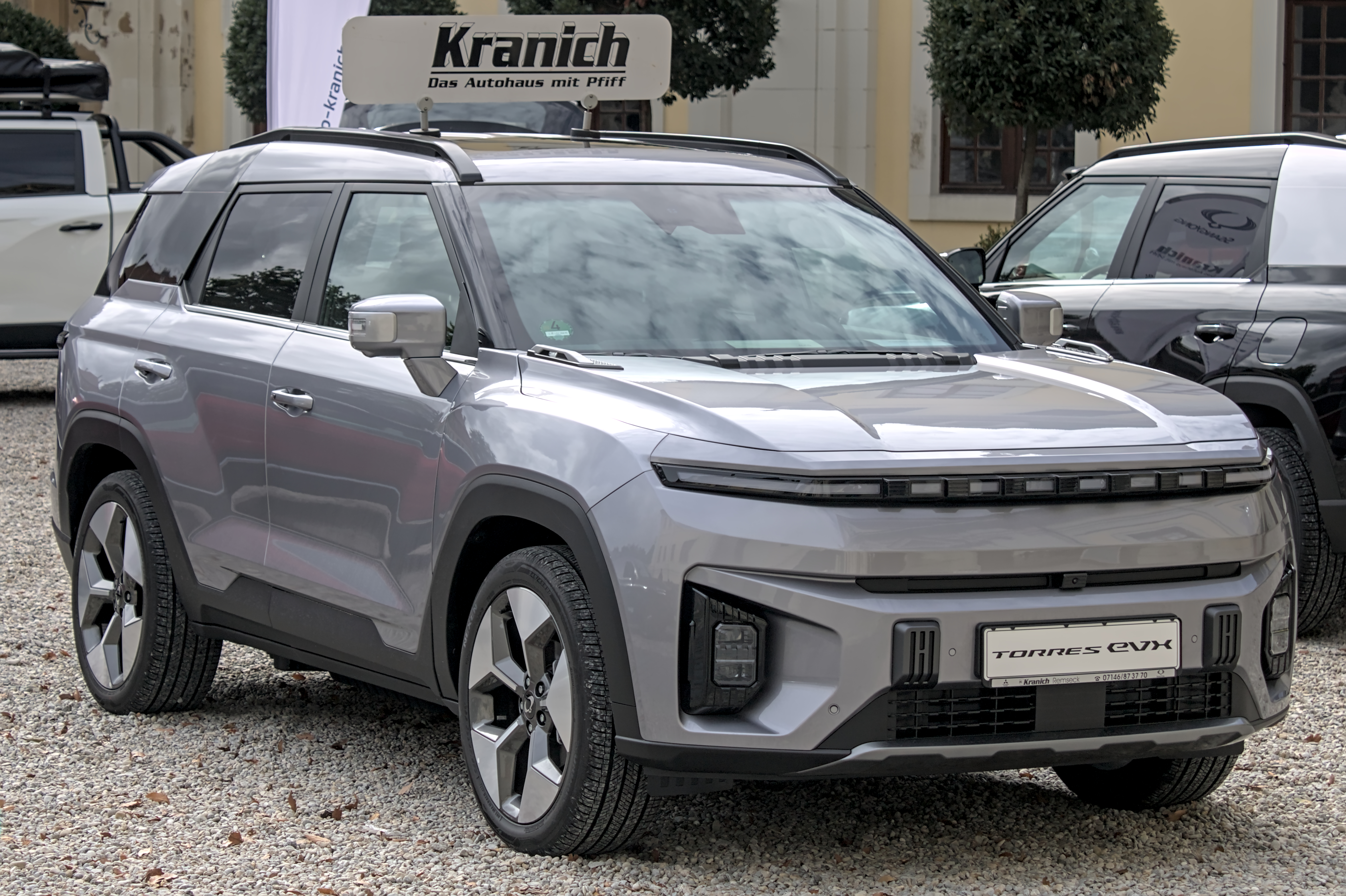
Front view

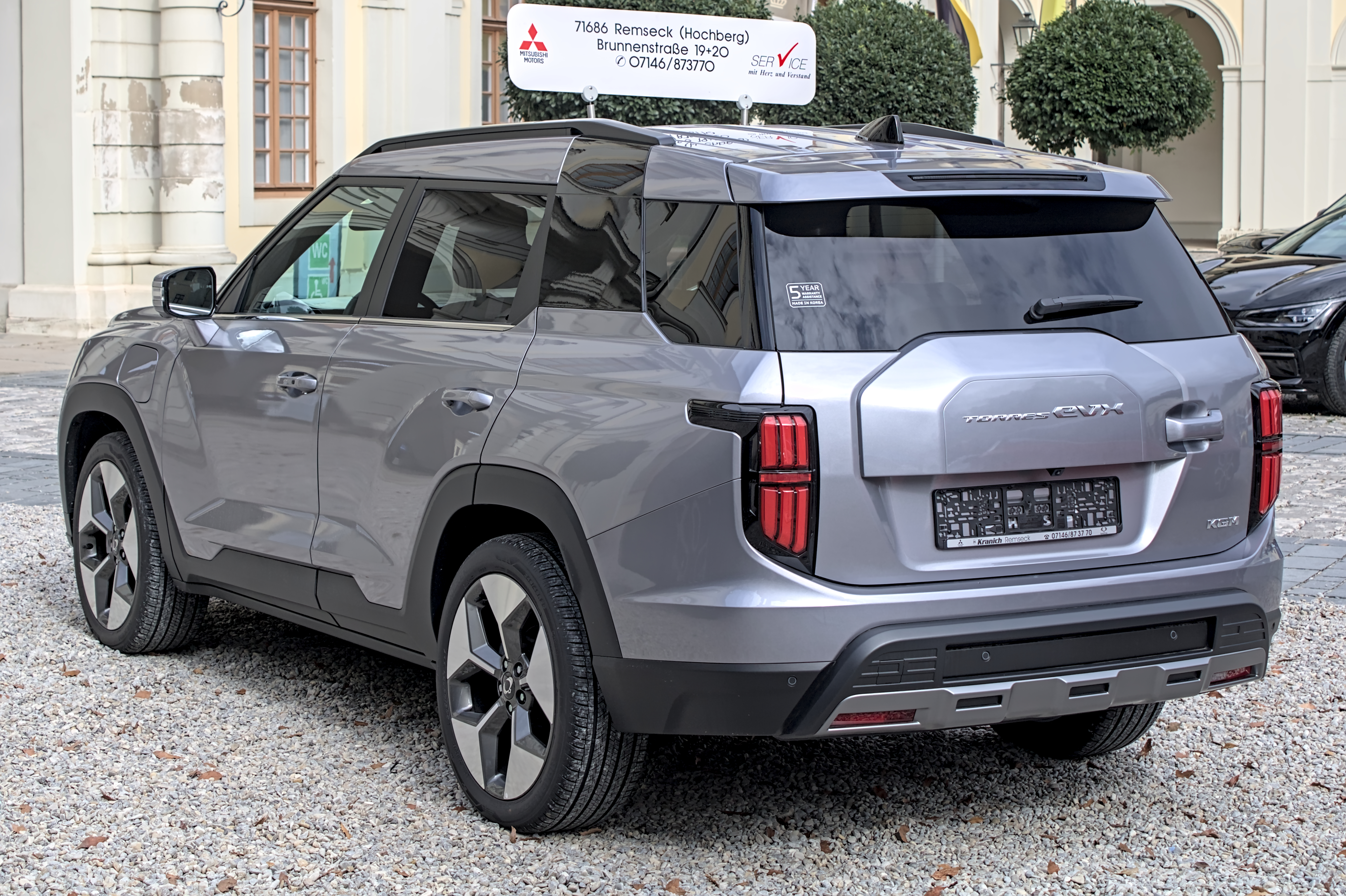
Rear view

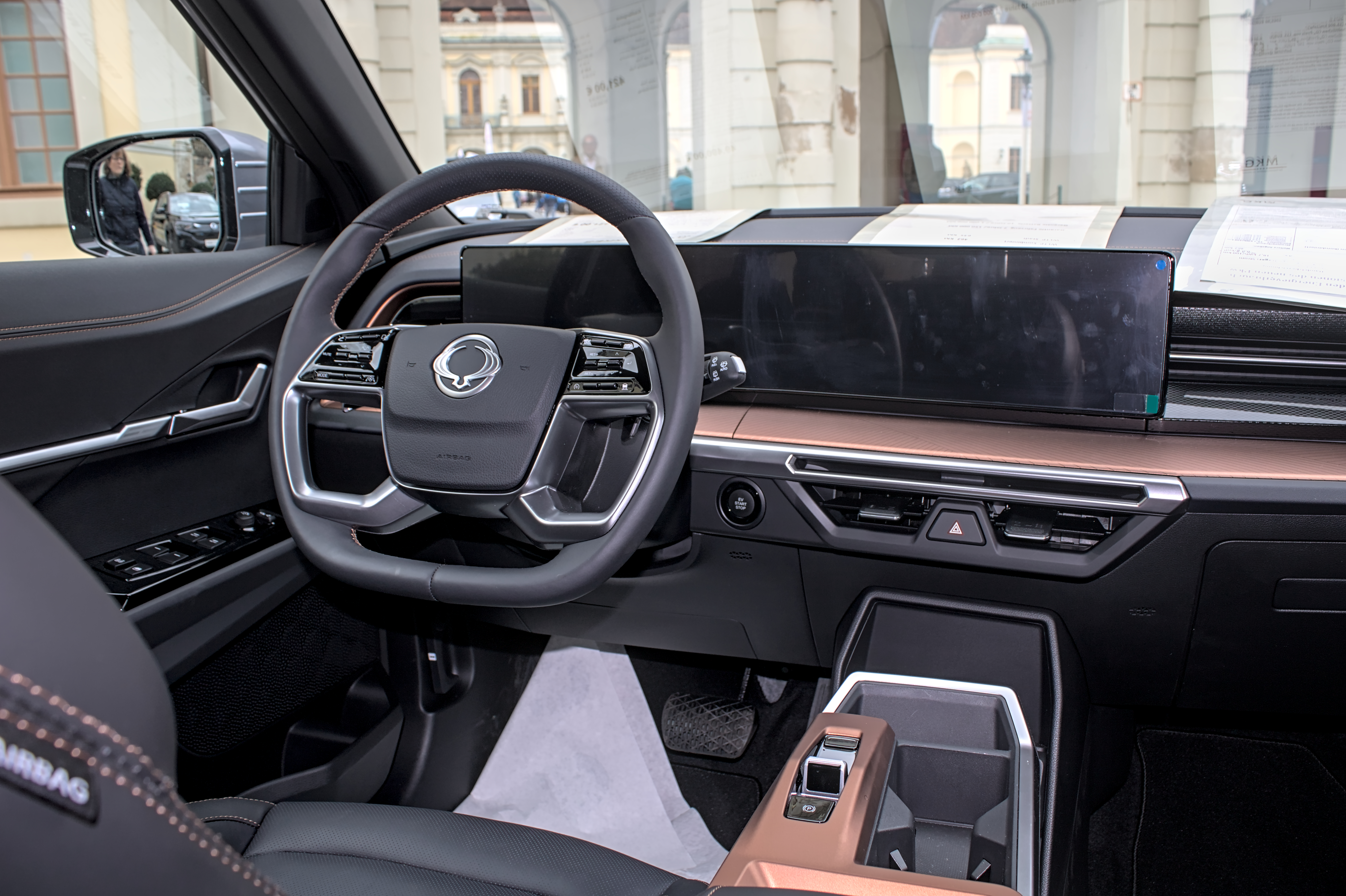
Interior

== Markets ==
=== Europe ===
The Torres was launched in Poland in July 2023. The EVX model was launched in Turkey in April 2023.

=== South Korea ===
The Torres was launched in South Korea in July 2022. A total of 48,259 units were sold from launch to June 2023.

== Sales ==
Year	South Korea		Worldwide		Turkey
Year	Torres	EVX	Torres	EVX	Turkey
2022	22,484	–	680	–	
2023	34,951	2,113	9,847	687	5,094
2024	13,170	6,112	10,960	7,808	8,401
