= KGM e-XDi engine =

The KGM e-XDi engine is a diesel engine family manufactured by KG Mobility.

== e-XDi 200 ==
The e-XDi 200 engine complies with Euro 5 emission standards. It delivers maximum torque at 1500 rpm and is designed for terrain with lots of uphill and downhill sections. Maximum output is 155 horsepower, and engine vibration is reduced by the shaft. It is optimized for various road driving environments such as slopes, curved roads, and mountainous roads by enhancing mid- and low-speed torque.

Applications

- SsangYong Korando Turismo
- SsangYong Korando
- SsangYong Korando/Actyon Sports
- SsangYong Rexton
- SsangYong Rodius

== e-XDi 220 ==
The e-XDi 220 engine has a maximum output of 178 hp and a maximum torque of 40.8 kg·m, and complies with Euro 6 exhaust gas standards.

Applications

- SsangYong Korando
- SsangYong Korando Turismo
- SsangYong Rexton
- SsangYong Musso
- SsangYong Korando/Actyon Sports
