= SsangYong Rodius =

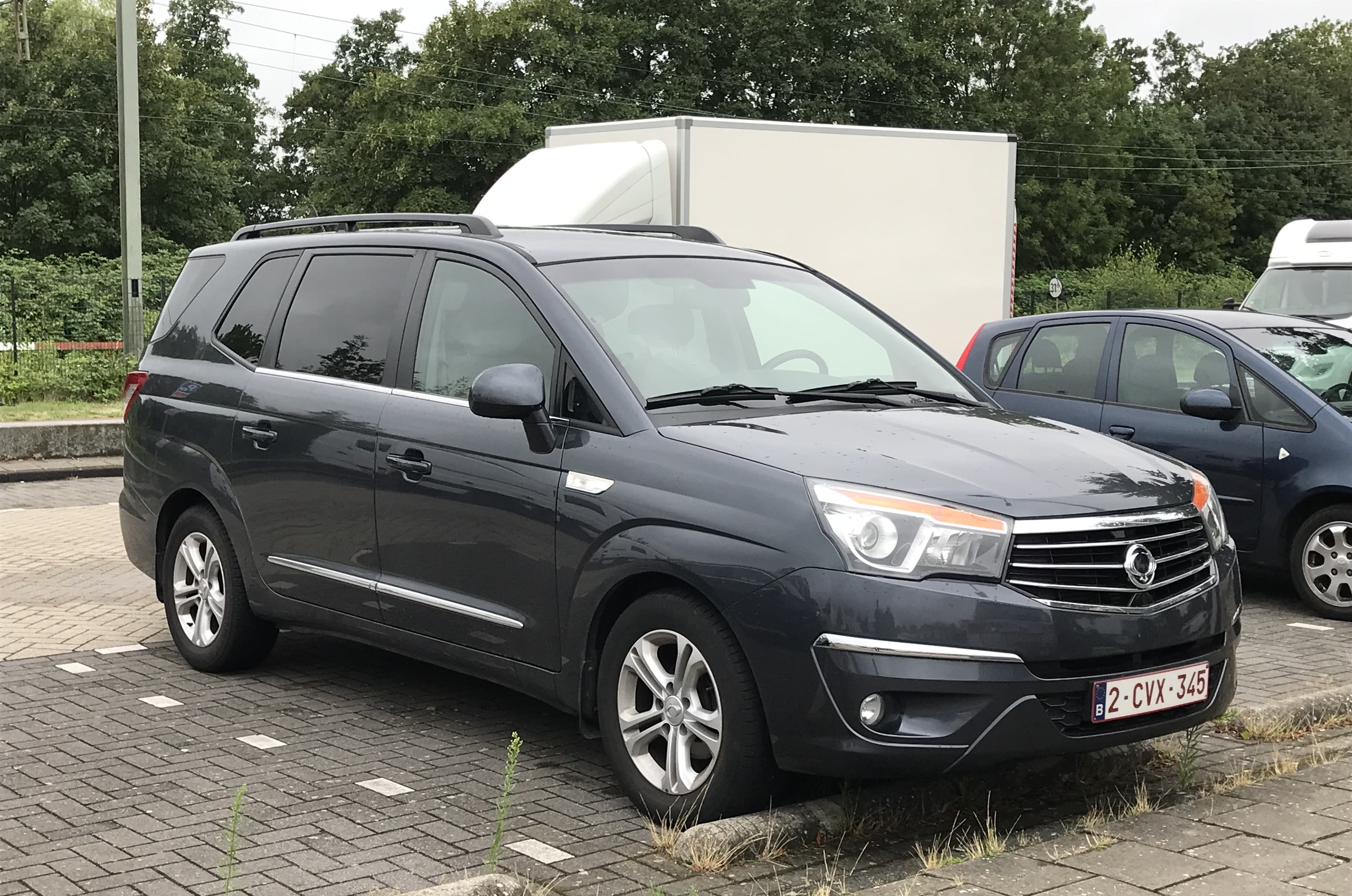

Overview
- Manufacturer: SsangYong Motor Company
- Model code: A100
- Production: 2004–2019
- Assembly: South Korea: Pyeongtaek, Gyeonggi Province

Body and chassis
- Class: Minivan
- Body style: 5-door MPV
- Layout: Front-engine, rear-wheel-drive Front-engine, four-wheel-drive

Chronology
- Predecessor: SsangYong Istana

The SsangYong Rodius (Korean: 쌍용 로디우스, sold in Australia, New Zealand, South America, Southeast Asia, and Africa as the Stavic) is an automobile released in late 2004 by the South Korean automaker SsangYong Motor Company. Rodius is an inaccurate portmanteau of the words road and Zeus, which is intended to mean "Lord of the Road." Considered a multi-purpose vehicle (MPV), it is available in 7, 9 and 11 seat configurations (3 or 4 rows), a 5-seater version is also available in Hong Kong. The seats can be folded to act as tables or folded further (double folded) to add extra cargo area. They can be turned around, encouraging conversation and can be slid forward and backward.

== First generation (2004–2013) ==
First generation
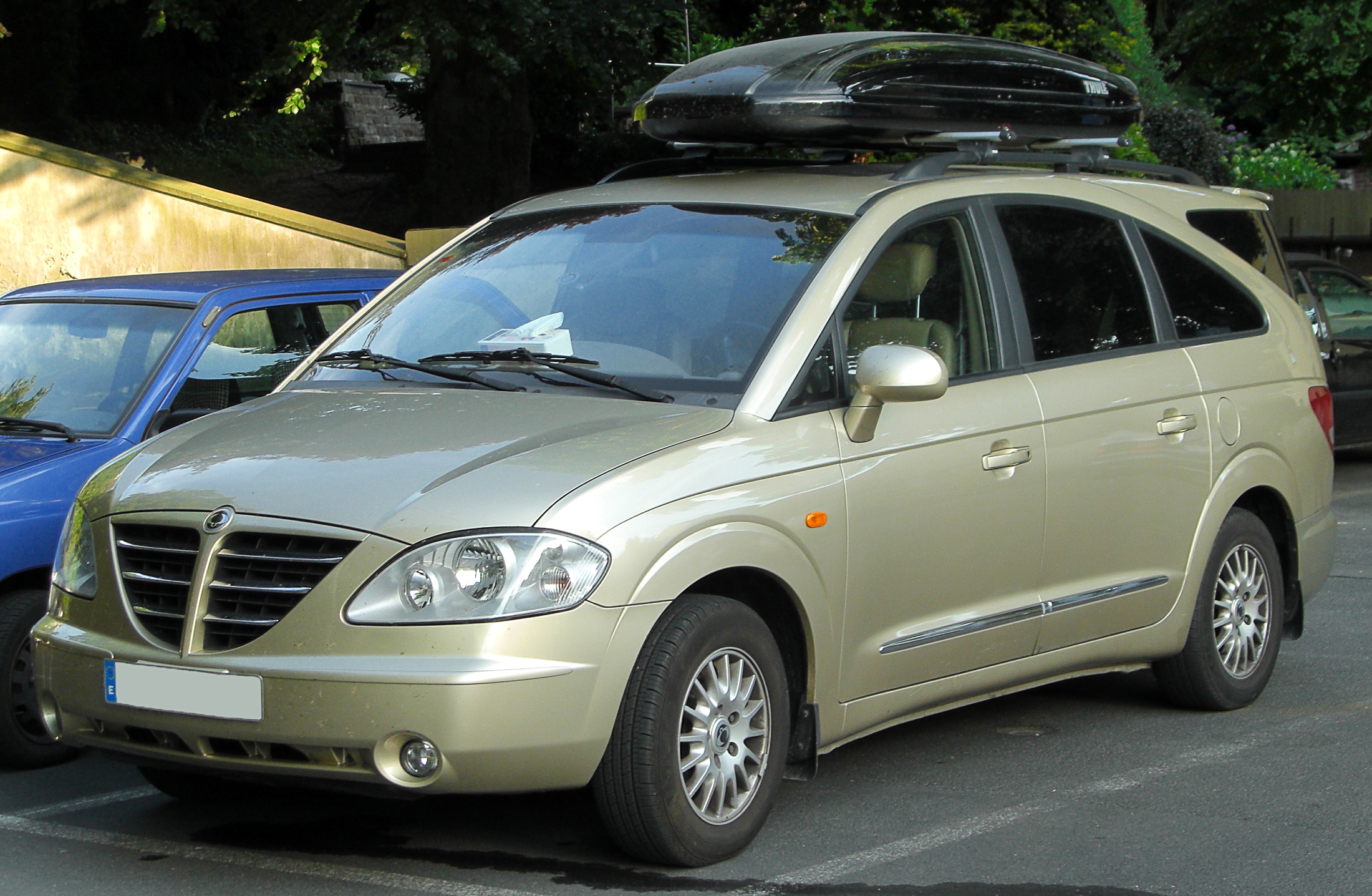
- First generation Rodius (pre-facelift)

Overview
- Also called: Micro Stavic (Sri Lanka); SsangYong Stavic (Southeast Asia); SsangYong Rodius Euro (2012); Daewoo Rodius
- Production: 2004–2012
- Designer: Ken Greenley

Powertrain
- Engine: 3.2 L M104 I6 (petrol); 2.7 L OM612 I5 (turbo diesel); 2.0 L e-XDi 200 I4 (turbo diesel)
- Transmission: 6-speed manual 5-speed automatic

Dimensions
- Wheelbase: 3,000 mm (118.1 in)
- Length: 5,125 mm (201.8 in)
- Width: 1,915 mm (75.4 in)
- Height: 1,821 mm (71.7 in)
- Curb weight: 2,300 kg (5,100 lb)

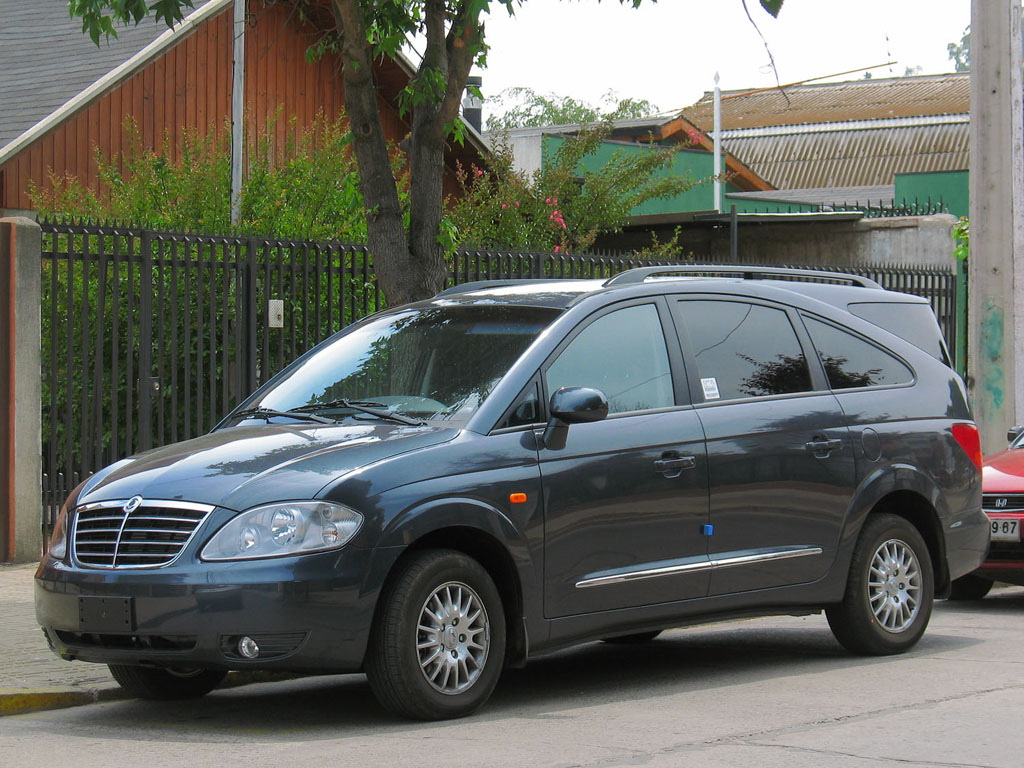
First generation Rodius (post-facelift)

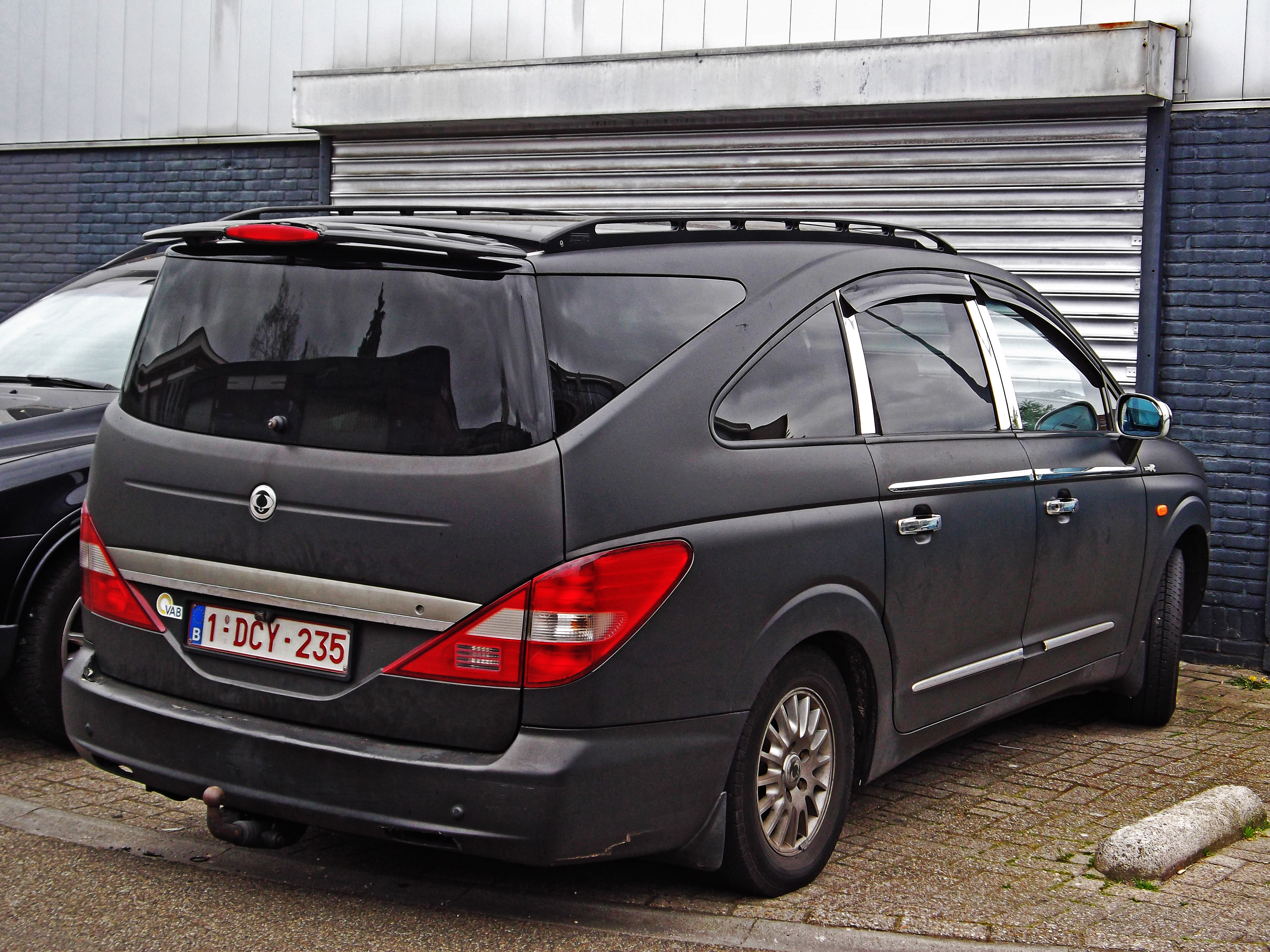
First generation Rodius rear

The engines are the Mercedes-Benz licensed 3.2 L 6-cylinder gasoline engine (162 kW (217 hp) & 309 N⋅m (228 lb⋅ft)) and the 2.7 L 5-cylinder common rail diesel engine (121 kW (162 hp) & 342 N⋅m (252 lb⋅ft)). The diesel engine was criticised as 'old-school' and 'dated', but praised for 'solid Mercedes underpinnings'.

The car was designed by Ken Greenley, former head of the automotive design course at the Royal College of Art in London. The design goal was to capture the essence of a luxury yacht.

In August 2008, the Rodius received a facelift which reduced criticism concerning its appearance, however the styling was still widely panned. Afterwards, because of poor popularity, the Rodius was discontinued in Europe without a direct successor on December 31, 2011. However, on July 2, 2012, the Rodius returned with the new name Rodius Euro which comes with the e-XDi200 diesel engine that produces 155PS of power, available with either a 6-speed MT or a 5G-Tronic automatic unit sourced from Mercedes-Benz. The manual transmission was often criticised by reviewers for a poor gearchange.

The car was criticised on release by many reviewers for poor build quality, handling, refinement, emissions, performance, safety, ride, and interior finish, but praised for its space, practicality, value for money, low price, number of seats, after-sales service, the availability of four-wheel-drive, Mercedes-Benz mechanicals, and generous warranty terms. Many were used as airport taxis due to the generous warranty and large space available, enabling the car to transport entire families while carrying luggage. In 2015 the first generation Rodius became one of the most popular vehicles on the Banger racing circuit due to its high centre of gravity and high strength in a collision, eventually leading to a ban from the sport in 2017, the second vehicle to be banned from Banger racing after the Chrysler Imperial in 2016.

=== Appearance and styling ===
In the mass media, the vehicle received some negative reviews of its aesthetics, with many describing it as the 'ugliest car ever'. The styling was described by contemporary reviewers and pundits as 'awkward-looking', 'curious', 'pot-bellied', 'abysmal', 'distinctive', 'challenging', 'hideous', 'controversial', 'oddball', 'outrageous', 'strange', 'weird', 'unusual', 'gopping', and an 'ocular insult' with a 'gormless face', 'barn-door' rear-end, 'shopping-trolley wheels', and 'grotesquely oversized front features'.

The styling was also notably condemned by Top Gear regarding the appearance of the standard wheel trims and 'gloopy front', saying that 'the whole rulebook on what is ugly has been rewritten'. As a follow-up, the car won the 2009 'WTF' award from Top Gear Magazine, which said that it 'looks like it got bottled in a pub brawl and stitched back together by a blind man'. Jeremy Clarkson described the car as an "unholy merger" of a coupe and a removal van, with 'wheels... the size of Smarties', while Richard Hammond criticised it as 'rather ugly'.

Due to its appearance, the car was quickly dubbed the 'Odious Rodius' by automotive journalists, some of which described the car as a 'surprised hippopotamus' that was 'so ugly it could frighten small children'. The car was voted by readers of the Daily Telegraph as the ugliest car on the road, taking 29% of the vote, commenting that 'even its own mother would call it ugly'. In Australia, the car was described by the Sydney Morning Herald as looking like 'a collapsing bus shelter', and by Wheels as 'having a face like a burnt thong'.

In response to this criticism, SsangYong denied that the car was ugly, and replied that the vehicle 'comes with a strong emotional component that will make it the focus of attention wherever it goes'.

In 2017, the British motoring television series Top Gear attempted to realise Greenley's design aspirations by combining a pre-facelift Rodius with a boat chassis to create a luxury yacht, which they named the SsangYacht. It was tested in Monaco harbour and reviewed by presenter Eddie Jordan for Boat International.

== Second generation (2012–2019) ==
Second generation
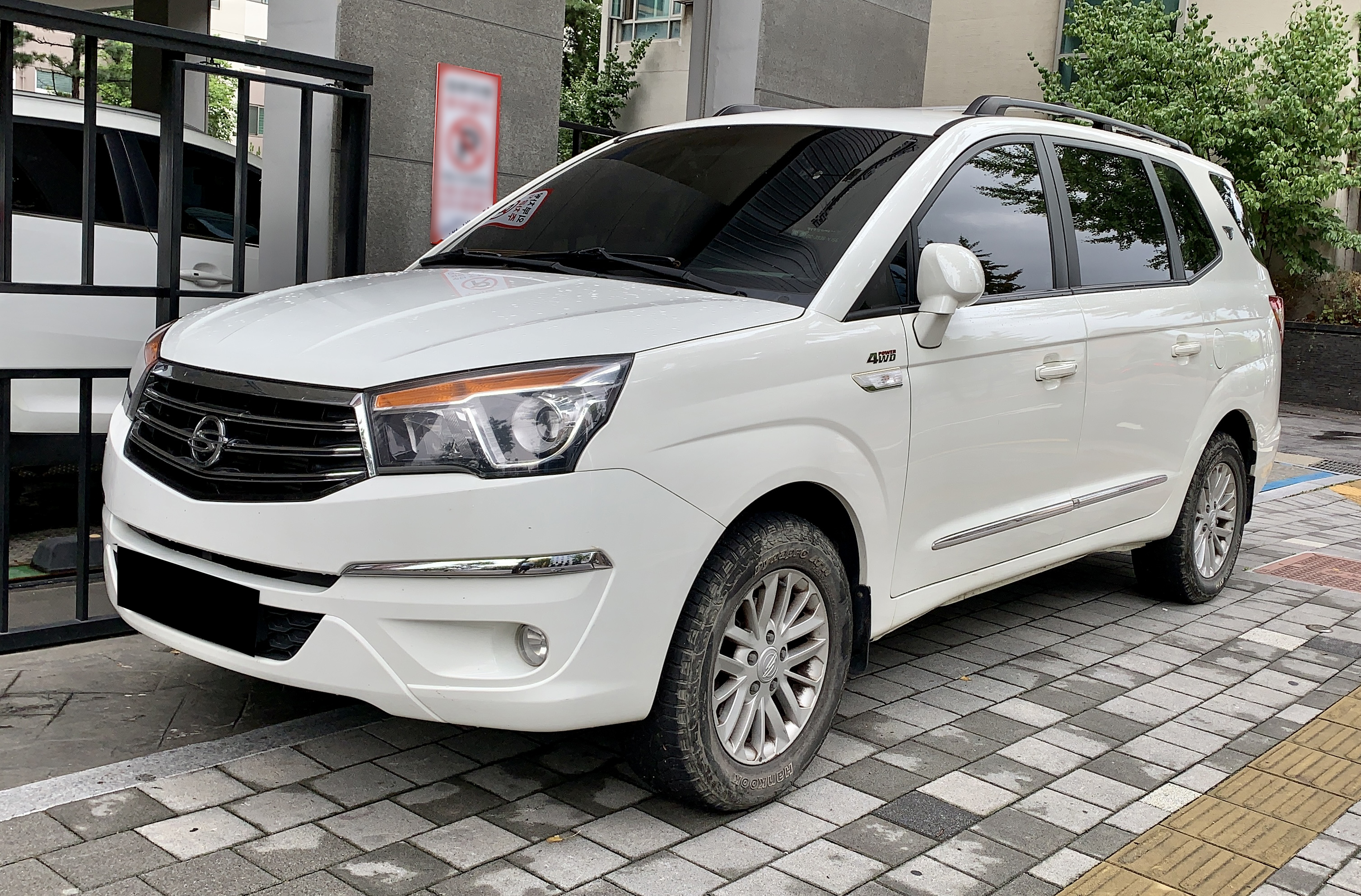

Overview
- Also called: SsangYong Turismo (United Kingdom); SsangYong Korando Turismo (South Korea); SsangYong Stavic (Southeast Asia); SsangYong Stavic Rodius (Algeria)
- Production: 2012–2019

Powertrain
- Engine: 2.0 L e-XDi 200 (155 Hp) I4 (turbo diesel); 2.2 L e-XDI 220 (178 Hp) I4 (turbo diesel)
- Transmission: 6-speed manual 5-speed NAG 5G-Tronic automatic 7-speed NAG 7G-Tronic automatic

Dimensions
- Wheelbase: 3,000 mm (118.1 in)
- Length: 5,130 mm (202.0 in)
- Width: 1,915 mm (75.4 in)
- Height: 1,850 mm (72.8 in)
- Curb weight: 2,411 kg (5,315 lb)

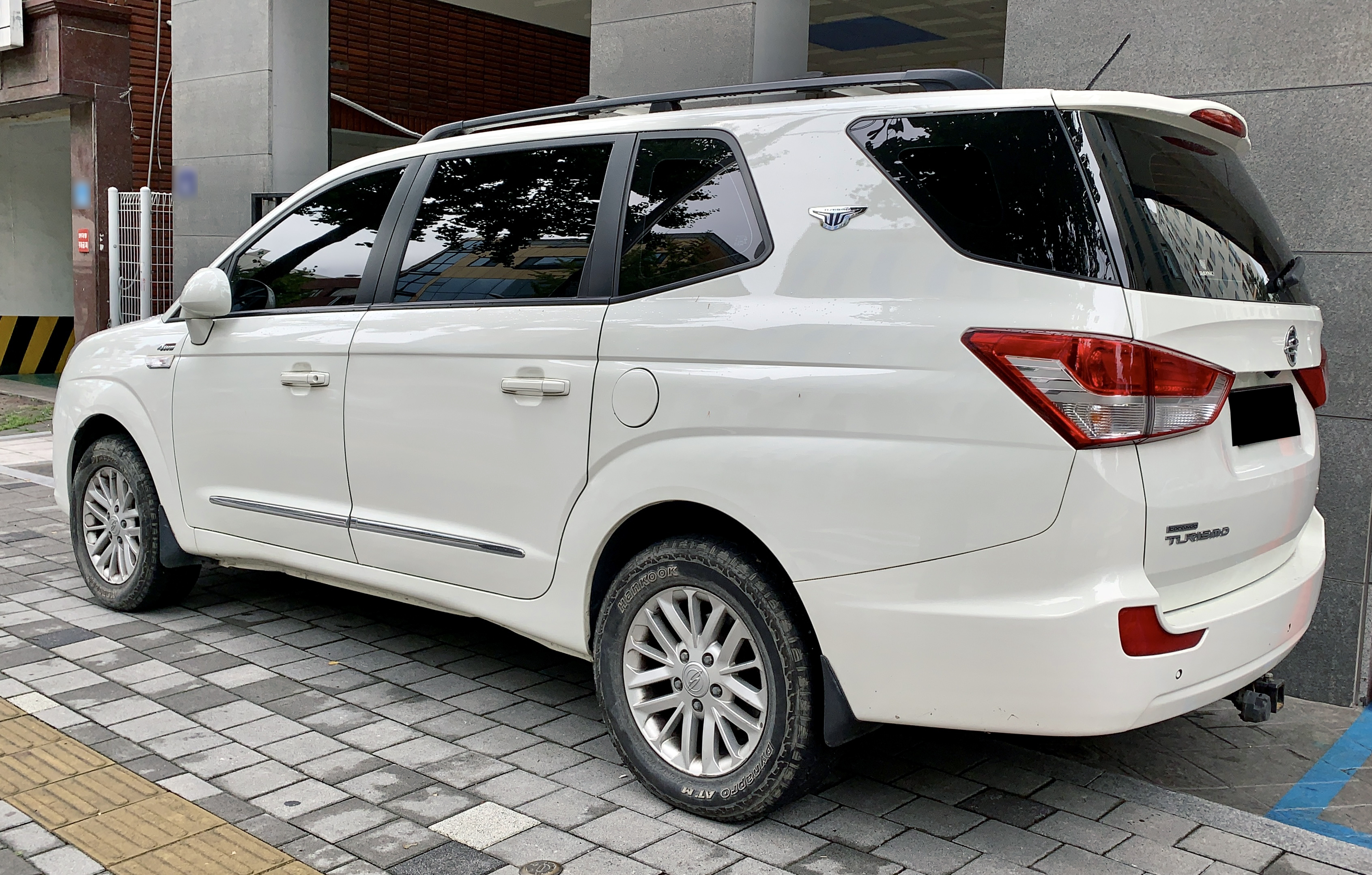
Second generation Turismo (Rodius) rear

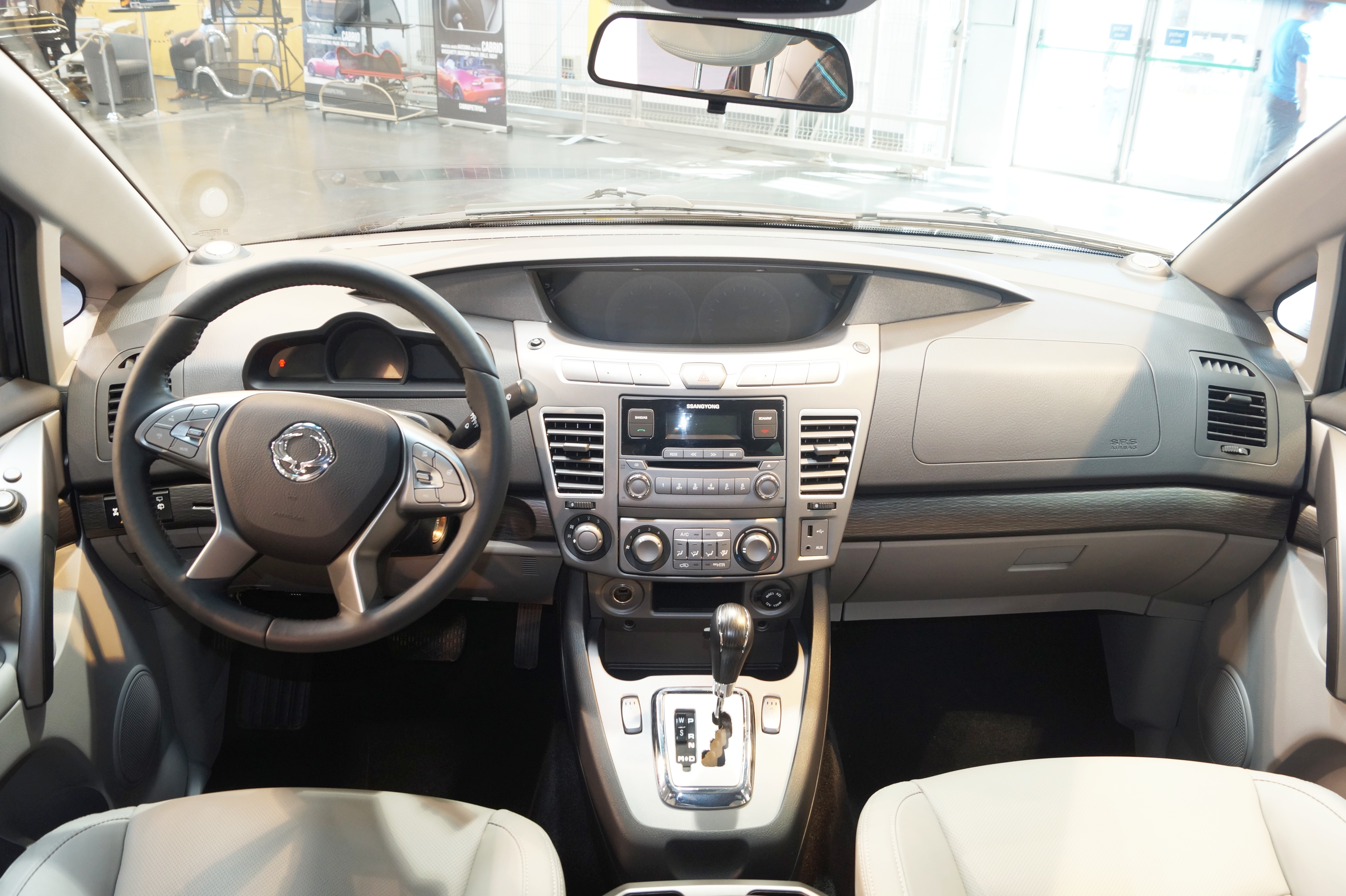
Second generation Rodius interior

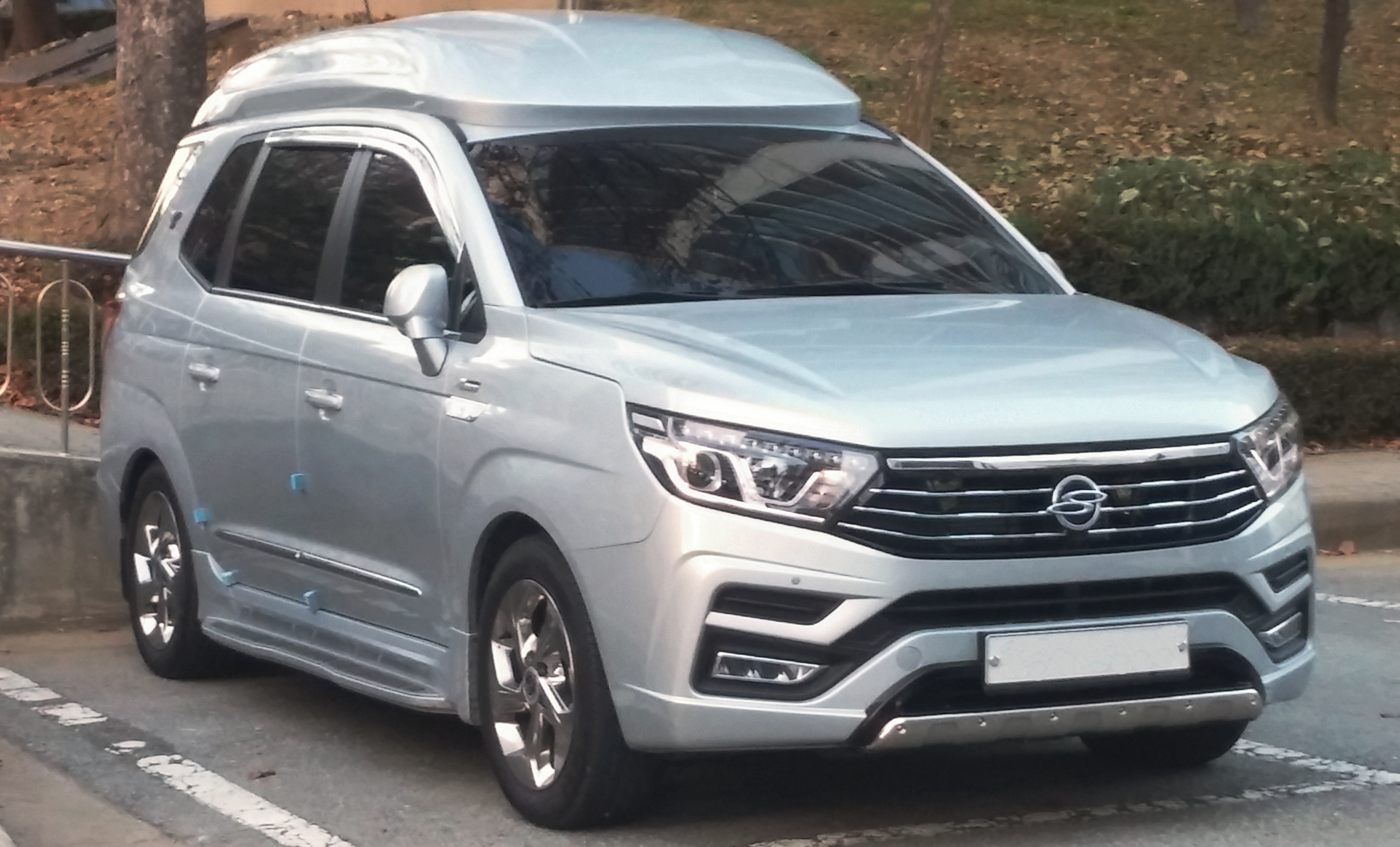
Second generation Rodius facelift

The second generation Rodius, called the Korando Turismo (Korean: 코란도 투리스모) in South Korea, was revealed on February 5, 2013 and was first shown at the 2013 Geneva Motor Show with sales commencing soon after. The new model comes in nine-, ten- or eleven-seat configurations (in addition to the standard 5 and 7 seat variants) and offers up to 3,240 liters of cargo volume. Powering the new Rodius/Korando Turismo is a 2.0-liter turbo diesel engine connected to either a 6-speed manual gearbox or a 5-speed Mercedes-Benz-sourced automatic transmission. The current 2016+ Turismo offers an updated 7-speed Mercedes-Benz e-Tronic gearbox with the same 6-speed manual available. The 2016+ Turismo also complies with Euro VI emissions standards. The car is based on the same platform as its predecessor.

This generation of the car is badged as the Turismo in the United Kingdom due to the particularly negative reception of the previous model in the UK regarding its styling.

In March 2014, the second generation Stavic was awarded “2014 Car of the Year – Best MPV Design” by Grand Prix, the most famous automotive magazine in Thailand, at the 35th Bangkok International Motor Show 2014. The styling was praised as a significant improvement on its predecessor.

In July 2018, the final facelifted version was launched with smaller headlights, a new front grille, a new front bumper, a resigned bonnet, a redesigned front fenders, a new steering wheel and new infotainment unit.

In 2019, SsangYong discontinued the Rodius/Stavic without any successor planned citing poor sales and implementation of the Euro 6D-Temp standards as both the 2.0L e-XDI 200 I4 and 2.2L e-XDI 220 I4 diesel engines offered on the Rodius are unable to be modified further to comply with the new emission regulations. The discontinuation of the Rodius/Stavic will allow SsangYong to now put its focus on crossovers, SUVs, and pickup trucks.

=== Safety ===
ANCAP test results Ssangyong Stavic (2013)
| Test | Score |
|---|---|
| Overall | 4 /5 stars |
| Frontal offset | 9.06/16 |
| Side impact | 15.49/16 |
| Pole | Not Assessed |
| Seat belt reminders | 0/3 |
| Whiplash protection | Not Assessed |
| Pedestrian protection | Poor |
| Electronic stability control | Standard |
