= Morattab =

Iranian SUV manufacturer

- Industry: Automotive
- Headquarters: Tehran, Iran
- Owner: Iranian government
- Parent: Industrial Development and Renovation Organization of Iran
- Website: https://morattab.com

Morattab or Morattab Company (Persian: شرکت مرتب) is an SUV manufacturer based in Tehran, Iran. Since 1962, the company has produced versions of the Series Land Rover under license in Iran.

After the 1979 Iranian revolution they built unlicensed clones that differ significantly from the final Series III built by Land Rover in the United Kingdom.

In 2003, they launched the production of the Ssangyong Musso.

== History ==
The Morattab Industrial Manufacturing Company was founded in 1957 – it was named: Sherkat Sahami Am Sanaati Towlidi Morattab (the Morattab Industrial Com.) – initially as an agent and distributor of commercial vehicles and trucks, before branching into the manufacture of Land-Rovers under licence from Rover of England in 1962.

The company was nationalised without compensation to its founders and rightful owners during the 1979 Iranian Revolution.

Following the 1979 Islamic Revolution, the Company ownership was transferred to the State, and IDRO (Industrial Development and Renovation Organization of Iran) took control of the company as the Government industrial arm, and as such, the Company underwent a change in the management (expropriation).

The Government, through Industrial Development and Renovation Organization of Iran (IDRO), was retaining a 33 percent share of the company until March 2000.
