= SsangYong Rexton =

Mid-size SUV manufactured by SsangYong Motor

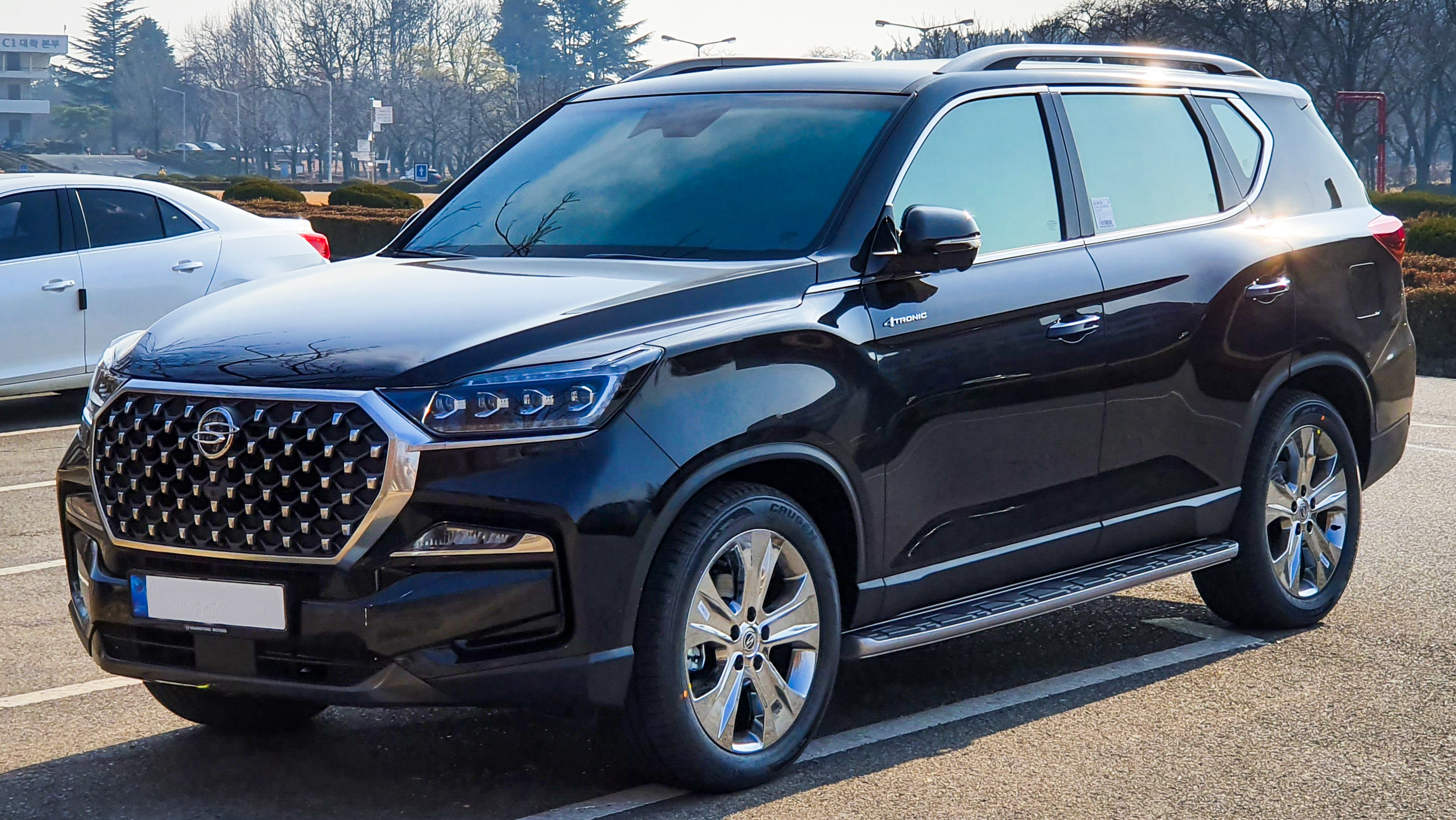

Overview
- Manufacturer: SsangYong Motor (2001–2023); KGM (2023–present)
- Also called: KGM Rexton (2023–present); KGM Ssangyong Rexton (2024–present)
- Production: 2001–present

Body and chassis
- Class: Mid-size SUV
- Body style: 5-door SUV
- Layout: Front-engine, rear-wheel-drive; Front-engine, four-wheel-drive
- Chassis: Body-on-frame

Chronology
- Predecessor: SsangYong Musso

The KGM Rexton, formerly SsangYong Rexton (Korean: 쌍용 렉스턴), is a mid-size SUV manufactured by South Korean manufacturer SsangYong Motor (currently KG Mobility) since late 2001. The name Rexton is derived from the Latin title 'rex' and the English word 'tone', which is intended to mean "the ruler's tone".

In 2017, the second generation Rexton debuted in Seoul 2017, and to the European market in Frankfurt 2017. The new generation Rexton features SsangYong's new body-on-frame platform, which it shares with the Musso pick-up. Other improvements include active safety driving pack, increased towing capacity, and electric parking brake system with auto hold. The Rexton is offered with a choice of a new 2.0L petrol turbo or 2.2L diesel engine and available in two or four-wheel drive. It is equipped with Mercedes-Benz 7G-Tronic automatic or Aisin 6-speed automatic transmission or 6-speed manual transmission.

== First generation (Y200; 2001) ==
First generation
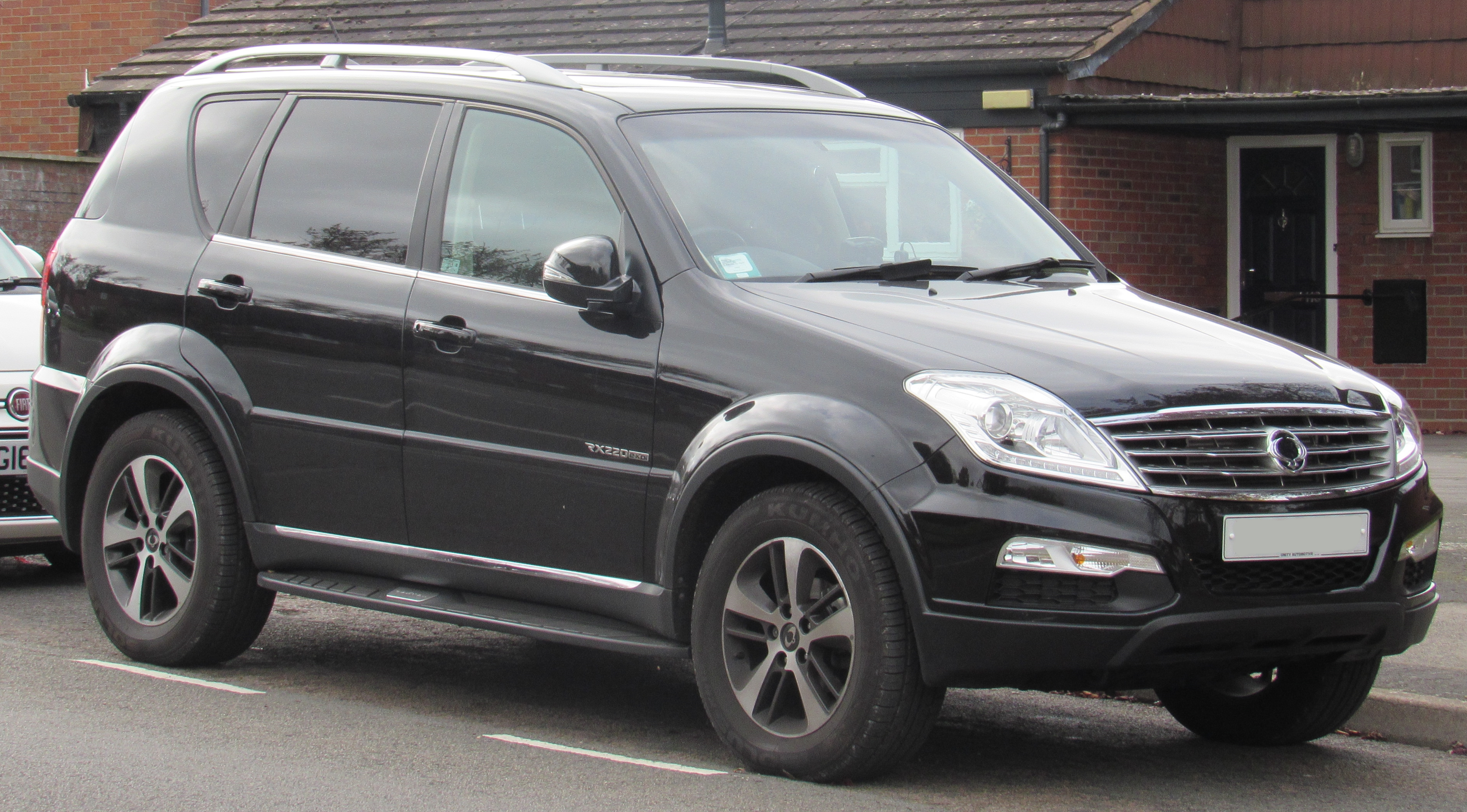
- 2016 SsangYong Rexton 2.2 ELX

Overview
- Model code: Y200
- Also called: Daewoo Rexton
- Production: 2001–2017
- Assembly: South Korea: Pyeongtaek; India: Chakan (Mahindra); Malaysia: Pekan (CSSB); Russia: Naberezhnye Chelny (Sollers JSC); Vladivostok (Sollers JSC, since 2009); Ukraine: Kremenchuk (Kremenchug Auto)
- Designer: Giorgetto Giugiaro at Italdesign

Body and chassis
- Related: Mercedes-Benz M-Class (W163)

Powertrain
- Engine: petrol: 2.3 L M111 I4; 2.8 L RX 280 M104 I6; 3.2 L RX 320 M104 I6; diesel: 2.0 L e-XDI 200 turbo I4; 2.2 L e-XDI 220 turbo I4; 2.7 L XDi 270 turbo I5; 2.9 L OM662 I5
- Transmission: 6-speed manual 5-speed 5G-Tronic automatic 7-speed 7G-Tronic automatic

Dimensions
- Wheelbase: 2,820 mm (111.0 in)
- Length: 4,720 mm (185.8 in)
- Width: 1,870 mm (73.6 in)
- Height: 1,820 mm (71.7 in)

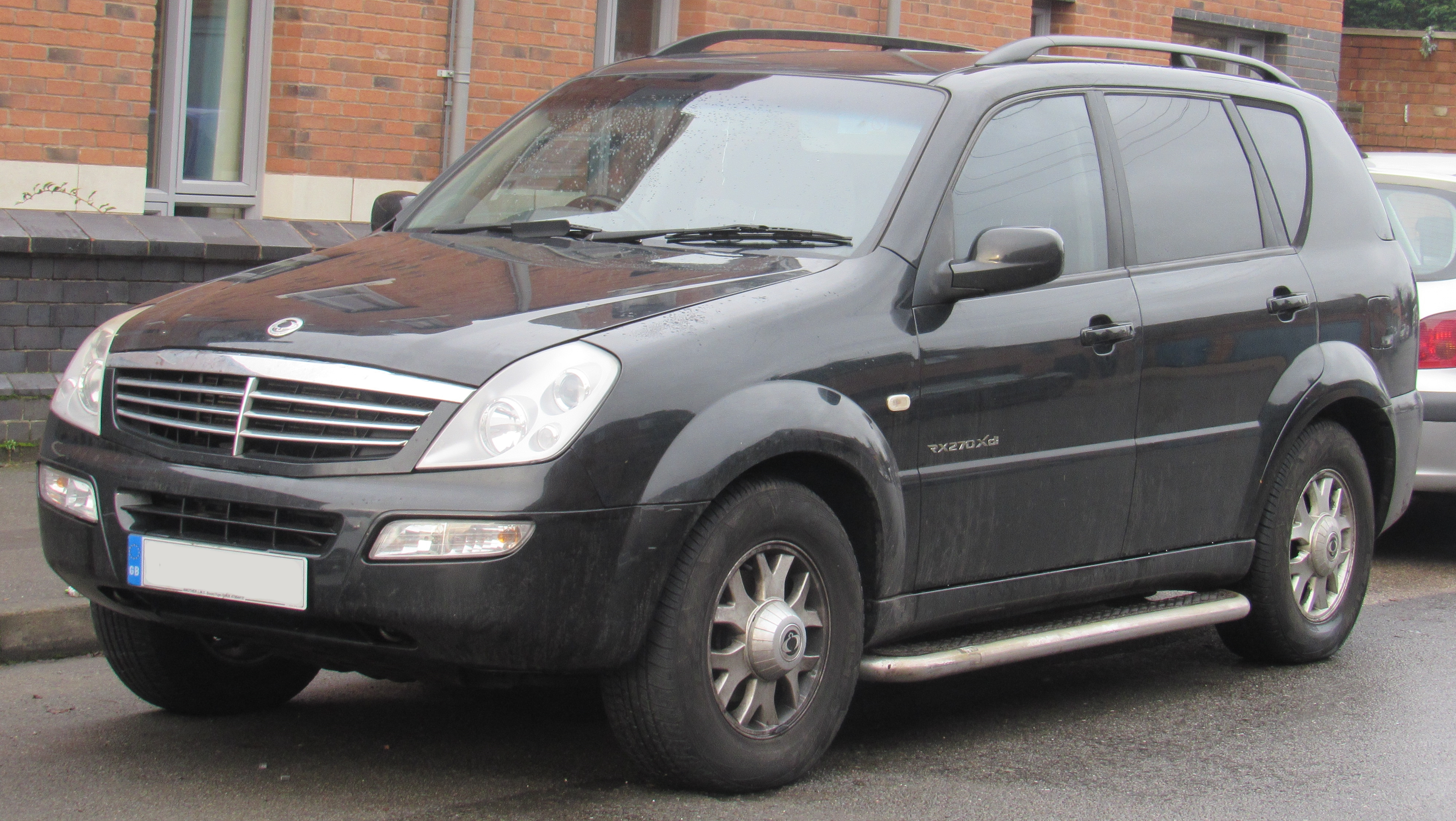
SsangYong Rexton 2001 to 2006 (Front)

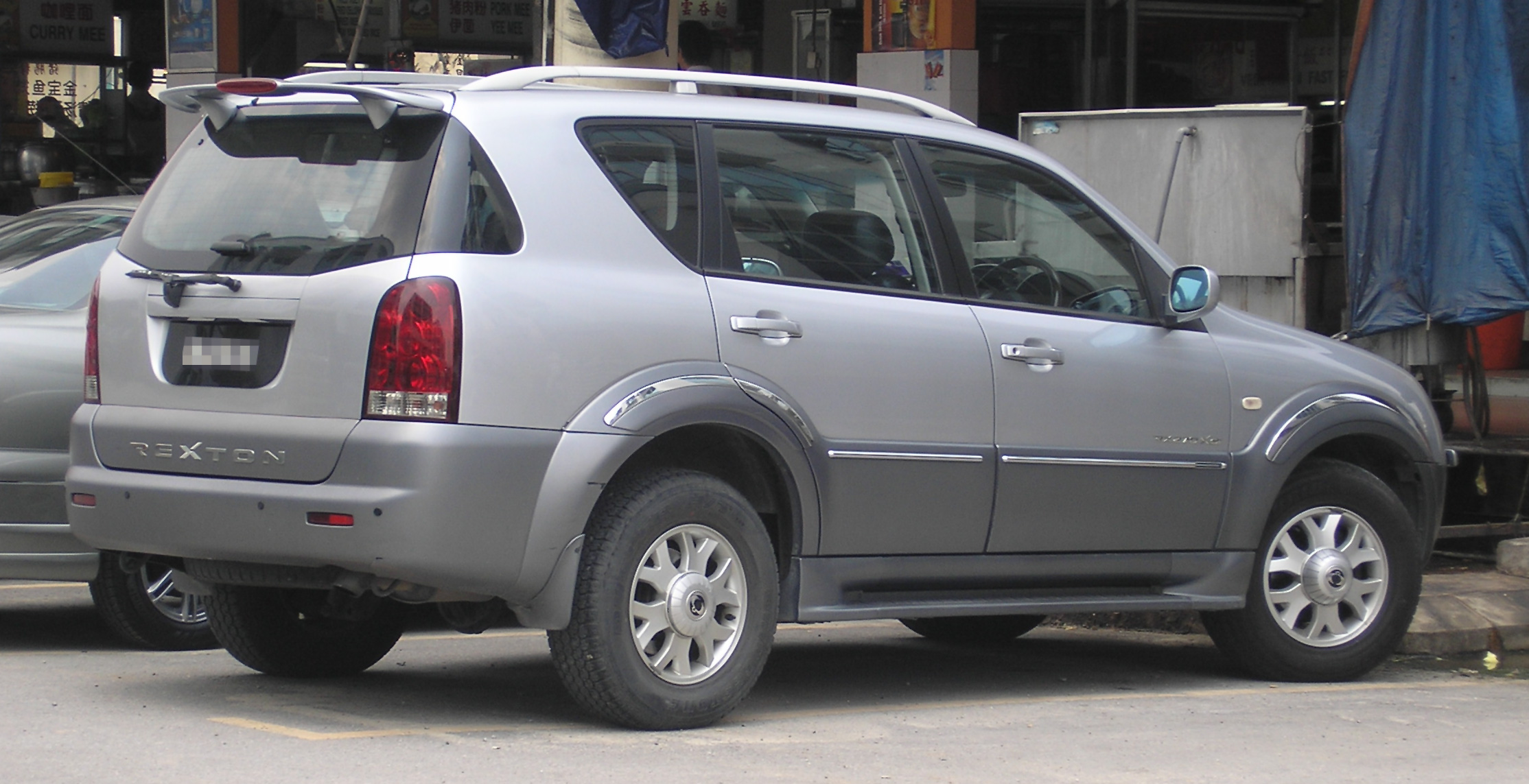
SsangYong Rexton 2001 to 2006 (Rear)

The Y200 series Rexton was produced from 2001 to 2006. The car's design was styled by Giorgetto Giugiaro's Italdesign studio. It was available only with four-wheel drive and one of four engines: a 2.3-liter 112 kW (150 hp) petrol engine, a 2.7-liter 121 kW (162 hp) and 342 N⋅m (252 lb⋅ft) common rail diesel, a 2.9-liter diesel and a 3.2-liter 162 kW (217 hp) and 310 N⋅m (229 lb⋅ft) petrol engine. The 2.7 XDi was based on the Mercedes-Benz OM612 CDI engine but was significantly re-engineered by SsangYong. The car was also available under a Daewoo badge in certain European markets such as France, without any technical or equipment changes. Production of the Daewoo Rexton stopped in early 2003 to make way for the car coming in as a Ssangyong instead.

In June 2003, the Rexton was introduced in Europe under the Ssangyong badge. It is based on a slightly extended chassis of the SsangYong Musso. Initially, it was only available with a choice of two engines: a 2.9-liter five-cylinder diesel and 3.2-liter six-cylinder gasoline engine. Both engines were borrowed from the Musso which were licensed from Mercedes-Benz.

The transmission options for the diesel model were originally either a five-speed manual with a gearbox from the American company Tremec or a four-speed automatic with a gearbox from the Australian company BTR Automotive. The petrol model was only offered with the automatic transmission. In 2004, with the introduction of the 2.7-liter XDi diesel engine, a five-speed Tiptronic gearbox (NAG 5G-Tronic provided by Mercedes-Benz) became an optional extra with that engine.

=== SsangYong Rexton II, first facelift (Y250; 2006–2012) ===
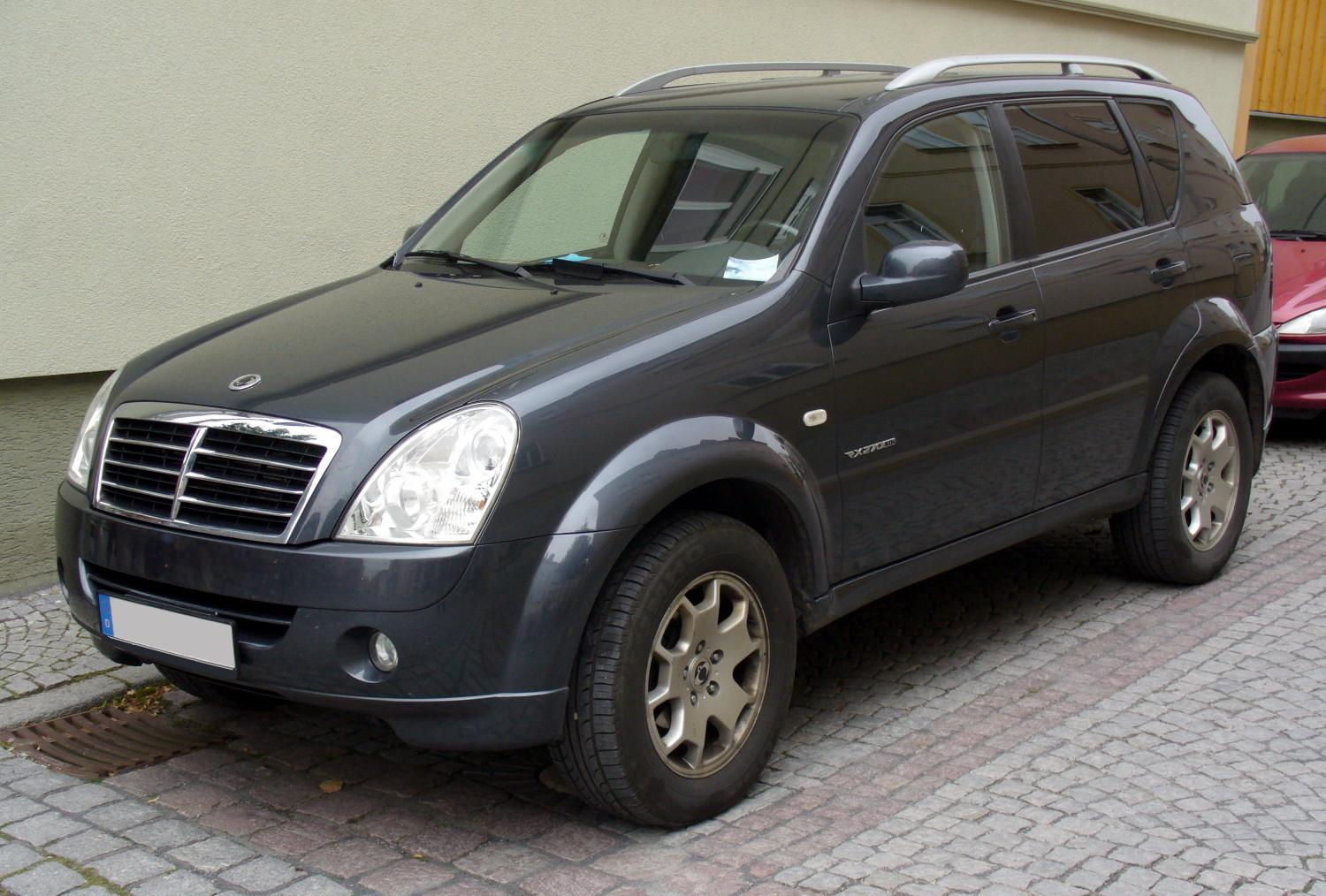
SsangYong Rexton 2009

In early 2006, SsangYong unveiled an upgraded Rexton. The vehicle features numerous technologies to reduce carbon emissions, such as a catalyzed diesel particulate filter and a variable-geometry turbocharger. Based on these upgrades, the South Korean government classifies the 2008 Rexton as a low-emissions vehicle, making it eligible for an exemption from a quasi tax related to environmental standards for five years after the purchase of the vehicle. Other improvements include enhanced parking brake technology, a tire pressure monitoring system (as seen on the SsangYong WZ concept car), an electronic toll collection system and a forward collision warning and avoidance system.

In Malaysia, the Rexton was assembled starting in August 2006 by Competitive Supreme Sdn Bhd (CSSB), also the sole importer and distributor of SsangYong vehicles in Malaysia.

In 2008, Project Kahn, famous for tuning luxury and sports cars, presented a modified Rexton 270 SPR at the 2008 British International Motor Show. It was so well received that in 2009, it became part of the British SsangYong range. It features added kit, chrome highlights and a "sportier" interior, but unusually, in the initial models, it does not have a radio/CD player, as it is intended that those that potential customers would want to put their own sound system in. However, the R-Line later gained a Kenwood double-DIN touch screen navigation system with steering wheel-mounted controls. The R-Line also has a more powerful version of the 2.7-liter straight-five turbo diesel engine producing 186 PS (137 kW) and 402 N⋅m (296 lb⋅ft) torque at 2400 rpm.

=== SsangYong Rexton W, second facelift (Y290; 2012–early 2017) ===
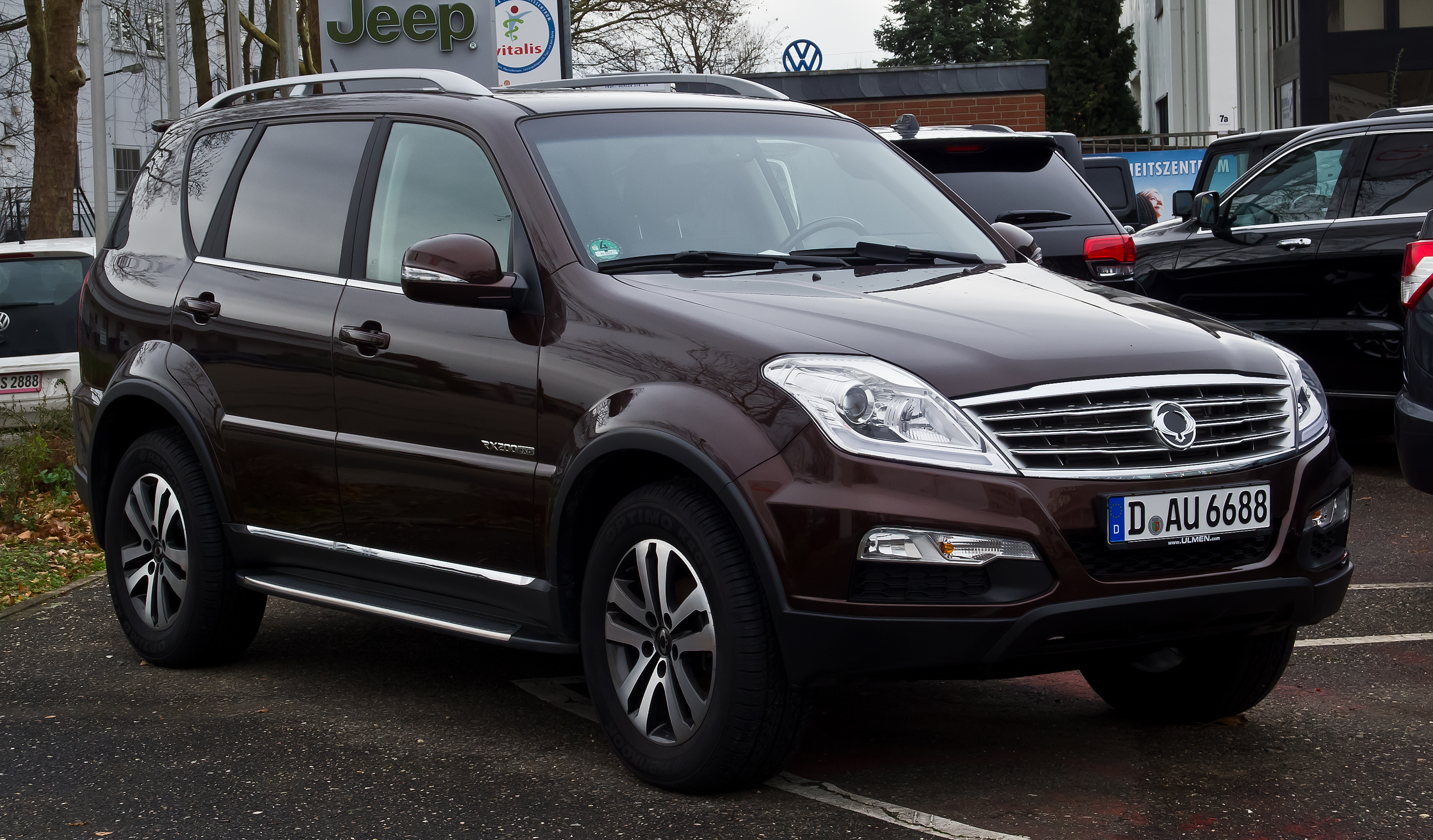
Rexton 2016 with slight facelift.

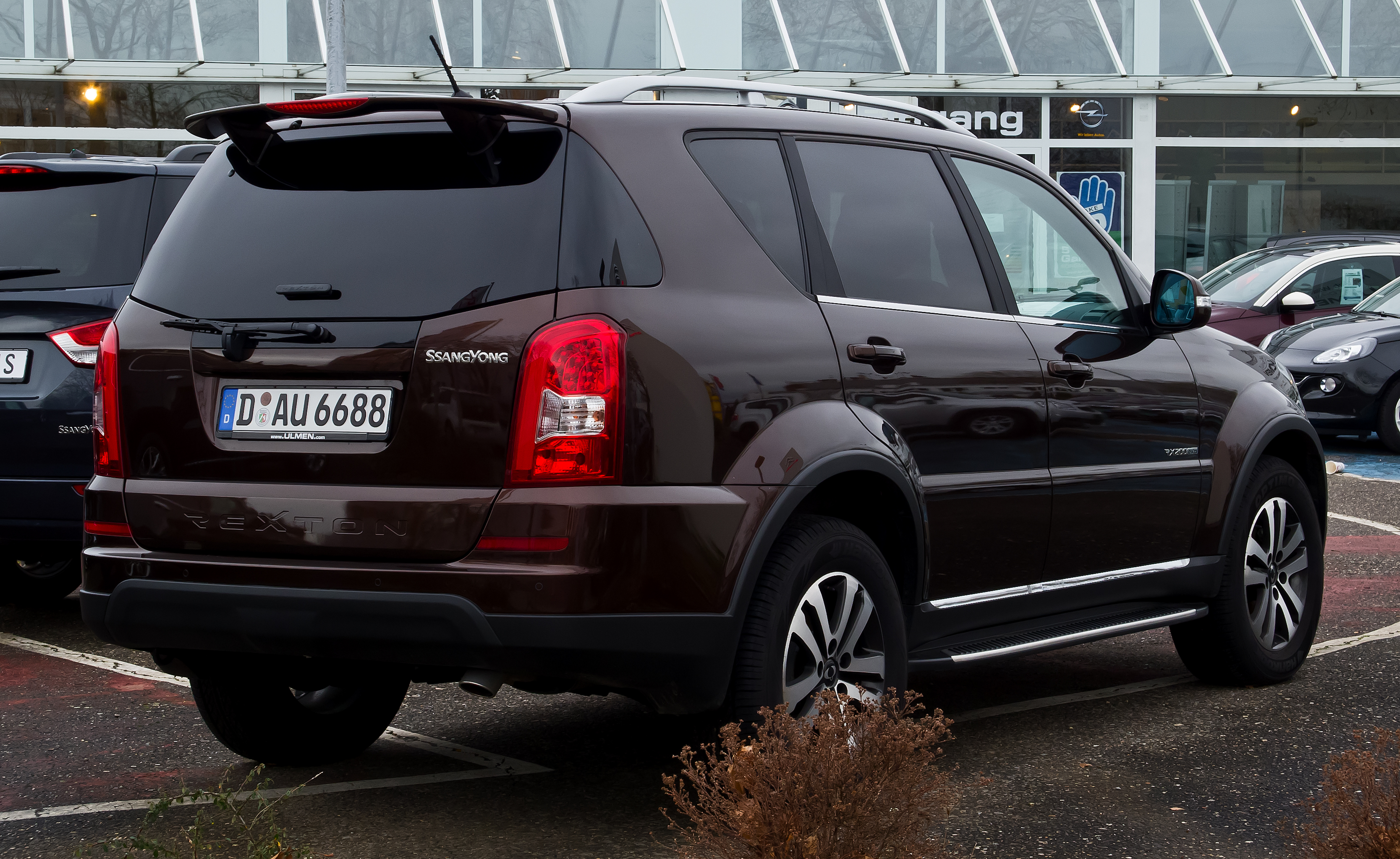
Rexton 2016 with slight facelift.

A revision version called the Rexton W, was released worldwide at Busan Motor Show 2012. And it was the first facelift model with Mahindra & Mahindra of which SsangYong is a subsidiary. SsangYong re-designed front grille with new headlights, rear combination lamp and retuned chassis. The car introduced the new 2.0-liter XDi diesel engine Euro 5 with standard DPF come from the Korando and the 3.2-liter petrol engine retuned for Euro 5 standard. And it is equipped with Mercedes-Benz 5G-Tronic automatic which the same gearbox with the previous model or manual gearbox.

At the end of 2015, SsangYong introduced to the European market the 2.2-liter e-XDi diesel engine with Euro 6 compliance. This engine improved power and torque than the previous 2.0-liter XDi diesel engine. This 2.2-liter diesel also comes with the Mercedes-Benz 7G-Tronic automatic gearbox.

=== Chinese copy controversy ===
In 2005, SG Automotive released the Huanghai Aurora which heavily resembled the Rexton. However, SsangYong chose not to sue SG Automotive, citing China's lawsuit system which is favorable to their companies. SsangYong only informed SAIC, which was the largest shareholder at the time, of the copyright issue with SG Automotive.

== Second generation (Y400; 2017) ==
Second generation
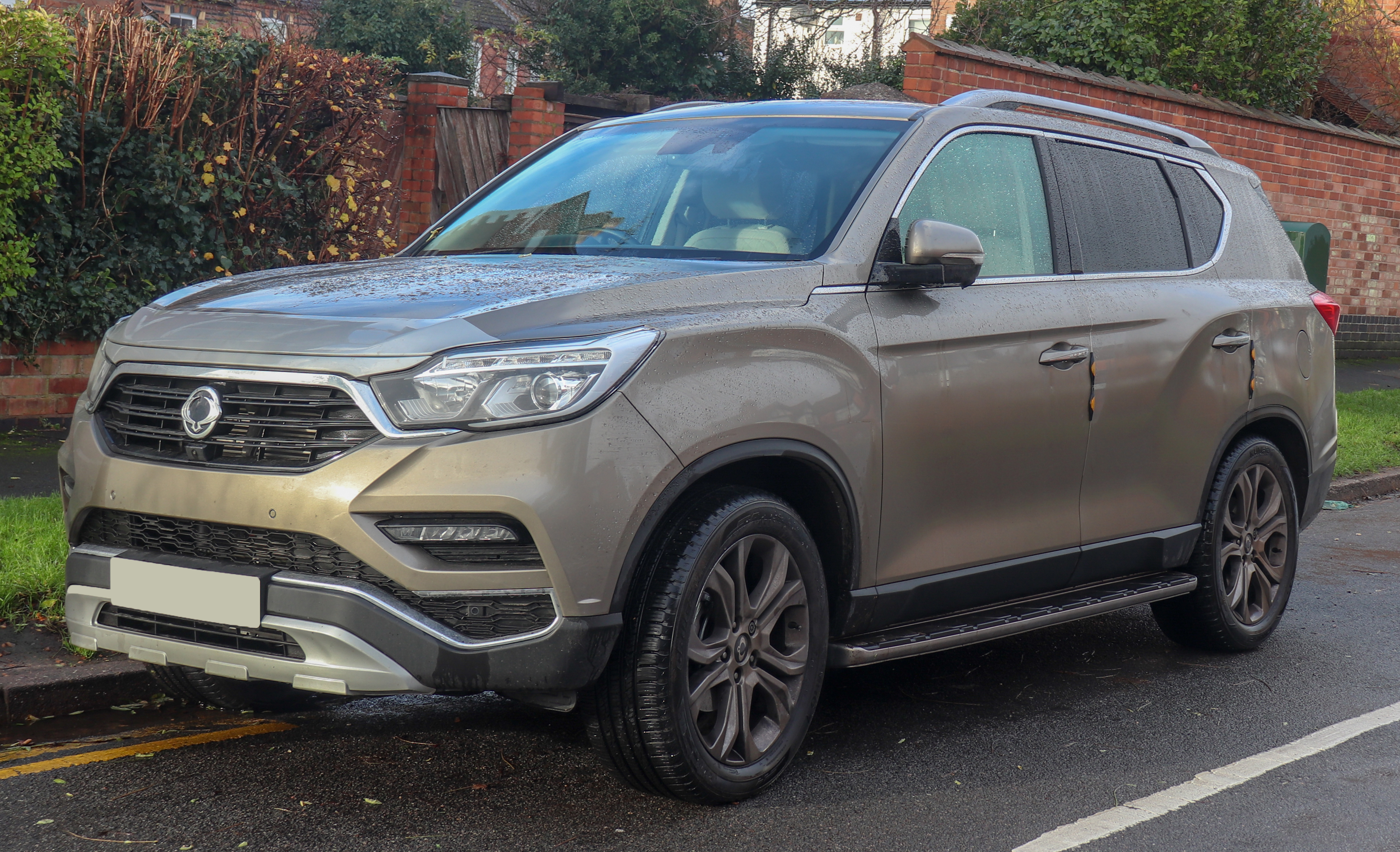

Overview
- Model code: Y400
- Also called: Mahindra Alturas G4 (India, 2018–2022); SsangYong G4 Rexton (South Korea); KGM Rexton (2023–present); KGM Ssangyong Rexton (2024–present)
- Production: 2017–present 2018–2022 (India)
- Assembly: South Korea: Pyeongtaek; India: Chakan (Mahindra)

Body and chassis
- Related: SsangYong Musso pick-up

Powertrain
- Engine: 2.0 L e-XGDI 200T turbo GDI I4 (petrol); 2.2 L e-XDI 220 I4-T (diesel)
- Transmission: 6-speed manual 6-speed Aisin automatic 7-speed 7G-Tronic automatic (pre-facelift); 8-speed automatic (facelift)

Dimensions
- Wheelbase: 2,865 mm (112.8 in)
- Length: 4,850 mm (190.9 in)
- Width: 1,960 mm (77.2 in)
- Height: 1,825 mm (71.9 in)

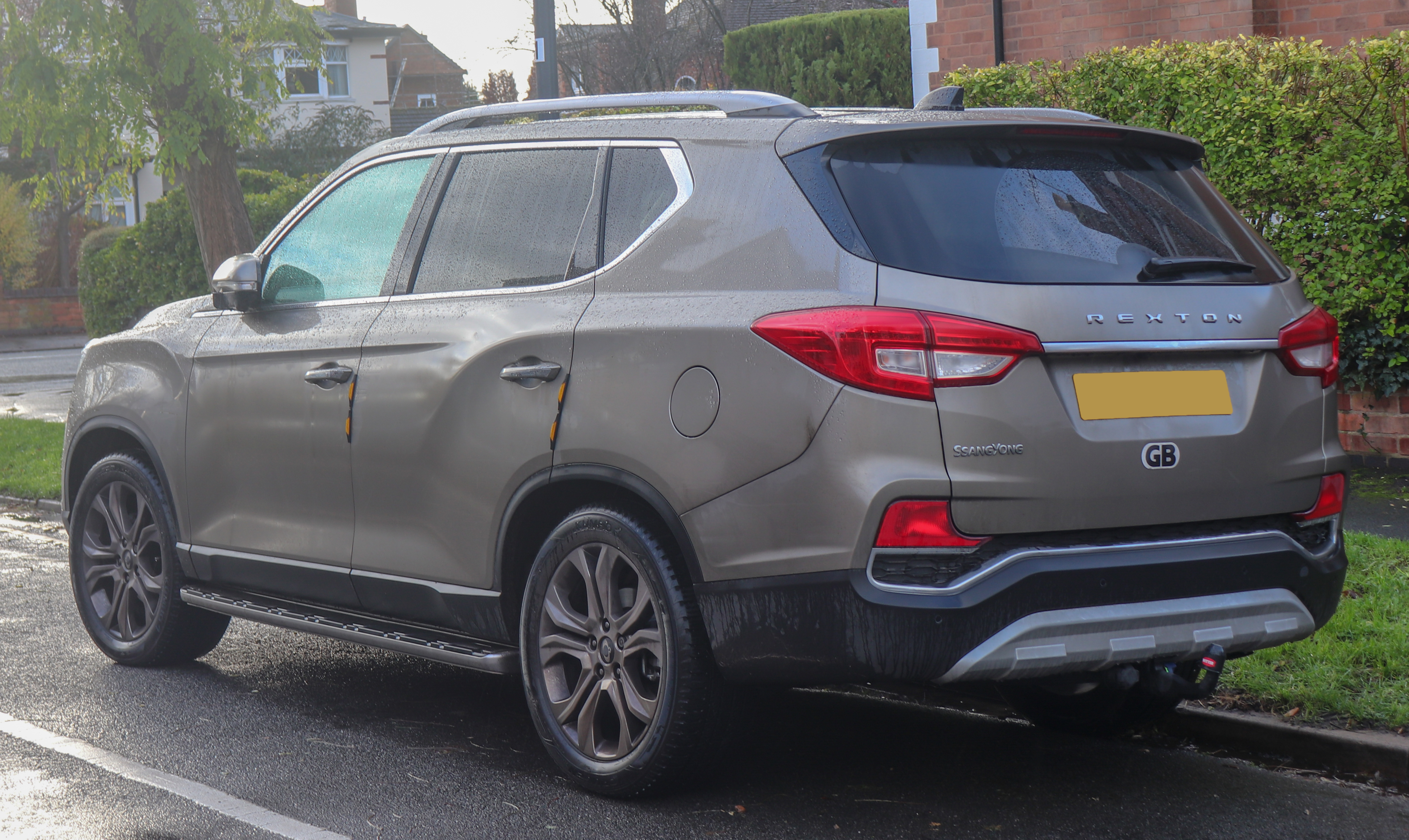
SsangYong Rexton 2017

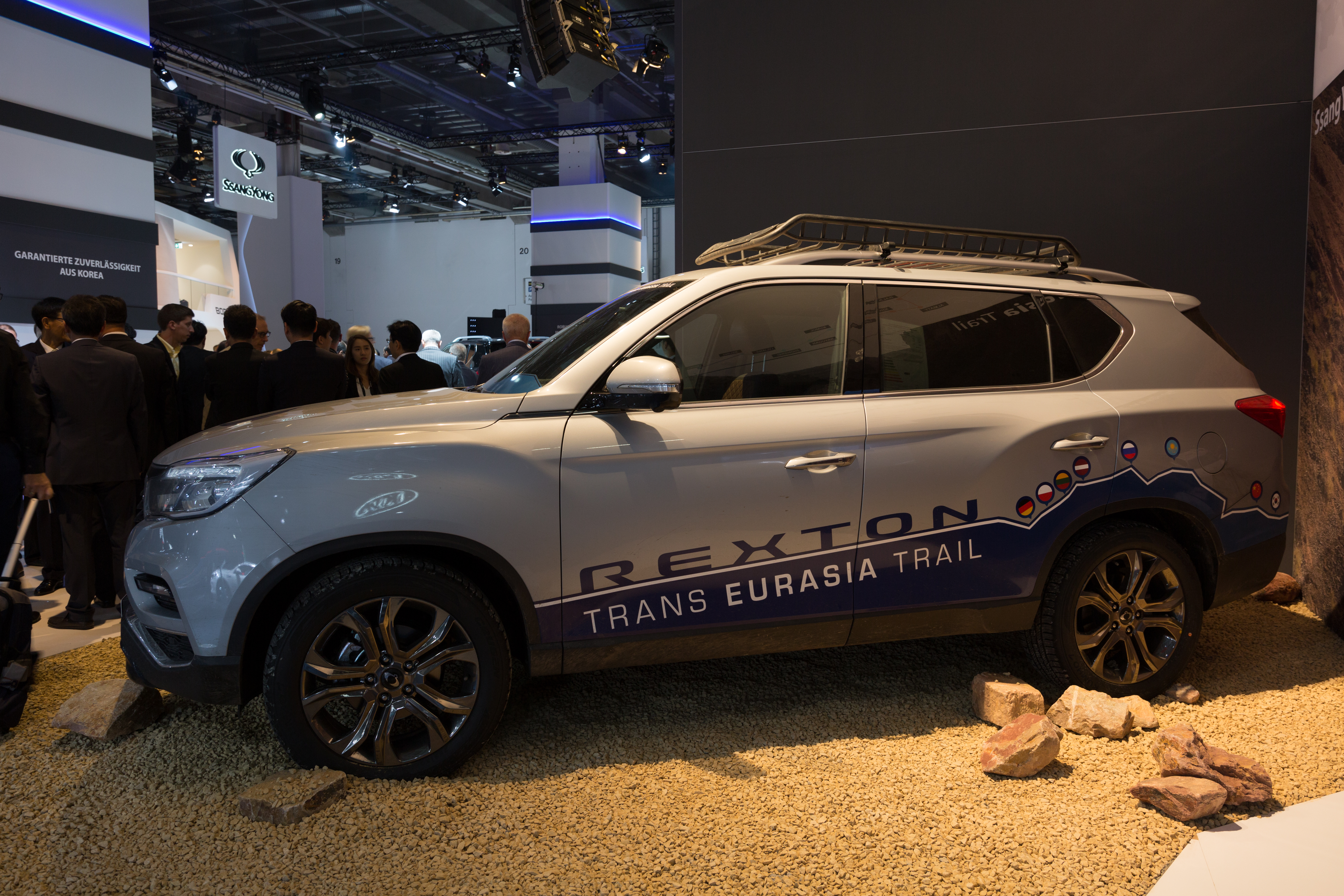
Trans Eurasia Trail version of Rexton

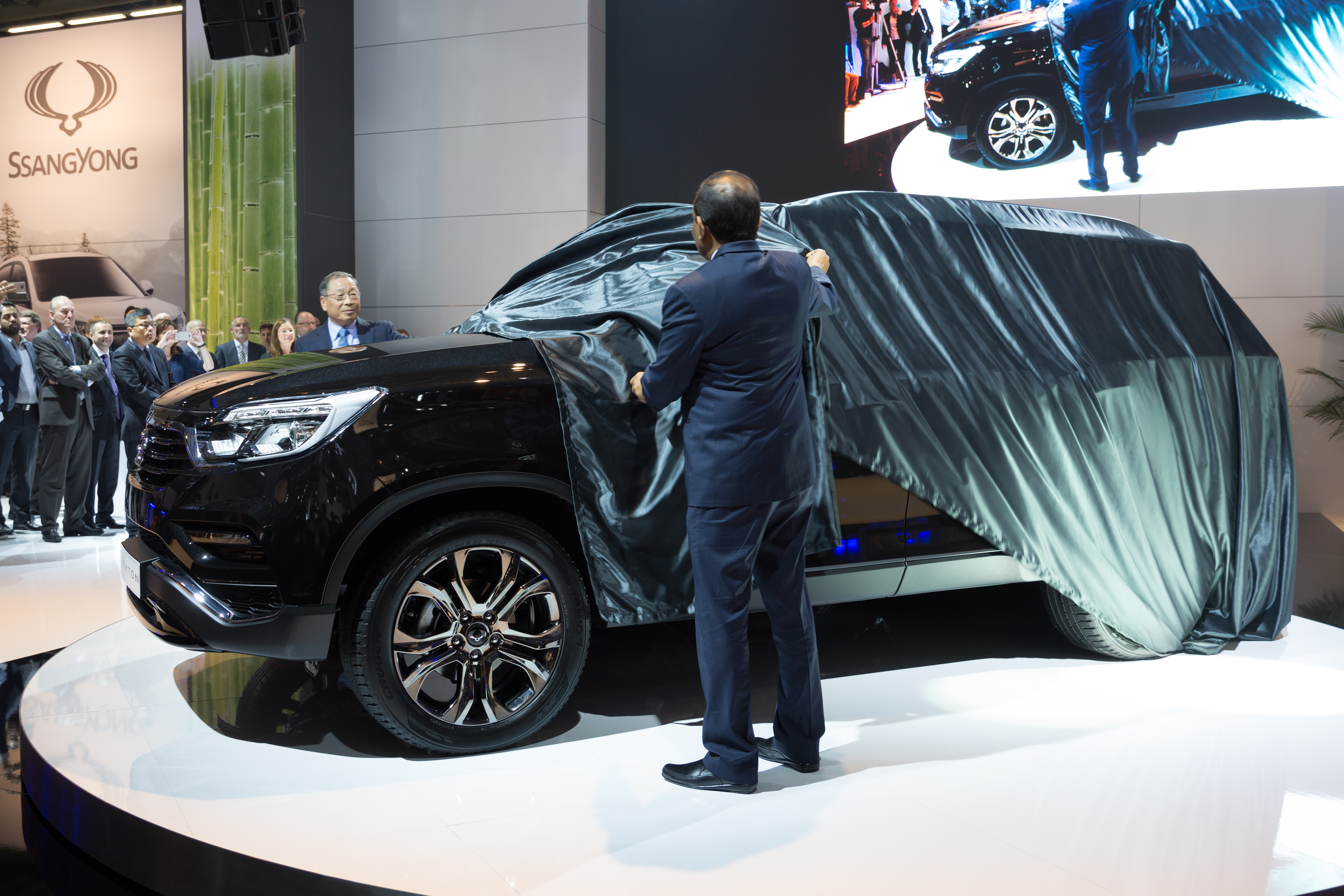
SsangYong's CEO Choi and Mahindra's Goenka reveals the Rexton in IAA

The Y400 series Rexton traces its roots to the SsangYong LIV-1 concept car and the SsangYong LIV-2 concept from Paris Motor Show 2016. In 2017, 2nd generation Rexton debuted to Korean market in Seoul Motor Show 2017, and to global market in International Motor Show Germany 2017. With the car's design, SsangYong claims that the Rexton got the inspiration from the Greek temple Parthenon.

The new generation Rexton features SsangYong's new body-on-frame platform using Advanced High Strength Steel (AHSS), which shares with SsangYong Musso pick-up. Other improvements include safety driving equipments, increased towing capacity (up to 3,500 kg) in both manual and automatic forms, and electric parking brake system with auto hold.

The Rexton is offered with a choice of a new 225 horsepower (168 kW; 228 PS) 2.0 L e-XGDI 200T petrol turbo engine or 181 horsepower 2.2 L e-XDI 220 diesel engine and available in two-wheel or part-time four-wheel drive. It is equipped with Mercedes-Benz 7G-Tronic automatic or AISIN 6-speed automatic transmission or 6-speed manual transmission.

=== Awards ===
In Korea, the Rexton was chosen as the Best Ergonomic Design Award by the Ergonomics Society of Korea. It also received Award of the Prime Minister in Korean Good Design Award 2017. G4 Rexton has earned Best Value award for two consecutive years. It won three titles at last year's awards including the Best Value Off-roader and 4x4 of the Year 2018. SsangYong Rexton named 'Best Value 4x4 2023' by 4x4 Magazine for 6 consecutive years. SsangYong Motors has collected yet another award for its flagship Rexton, which has been named as the 'Best Value' off-roader, for an unprecedented sixth year running in the '4x4 of the Year 2023' awards, sponsored by BFGoodrich.

=== Safety ===
The second generation Rexton equipped with 9 airbags, including a driver knee-airbag and second-row side airbags. It also features intelligent safety driving system including Autonomous Emergency Brake System (AEBS), Forward Collision Warning System (FCWS), Lane Departure Warning System (LDWS), High Beam Assist (HBA), Lane Change Assist (LCA), and Rear Cross-Traffic Alert (RCTA).

In Korean New Car Assessment Program (KNCAP) the SsangYong G4 Rexton received top safety rating of Grade1 (5 stars, 88.5 pts.) on a 2017 registration.

=== Mahindra Alturas G4 (2018–2022) ===
Mahindra revealed a rebadged version of the second-generation Rexton, called the Alturas G4, at the 2018 Auto Expo in India. The SUV is positioned above the Mahindra XUV500. It failed because of tough competition and RDE norms strict.

During its production run, it was offered with both 2WD and 4WD drivetrains and served as the flagship model of the brand until it was discontinued in late 2022 due to poor sales and marketing.

The Alturas G4 was assembled at the Mahindra & Mahindra Chakan Plant in India between 2018 and 2022, utilising CKD methods from SsangYong's Pyeongtaek plant.

=== Facelift (Y450; 2020–present) ===
The facelifted Rexton was unveiled in September 2019 as the 2020 model.

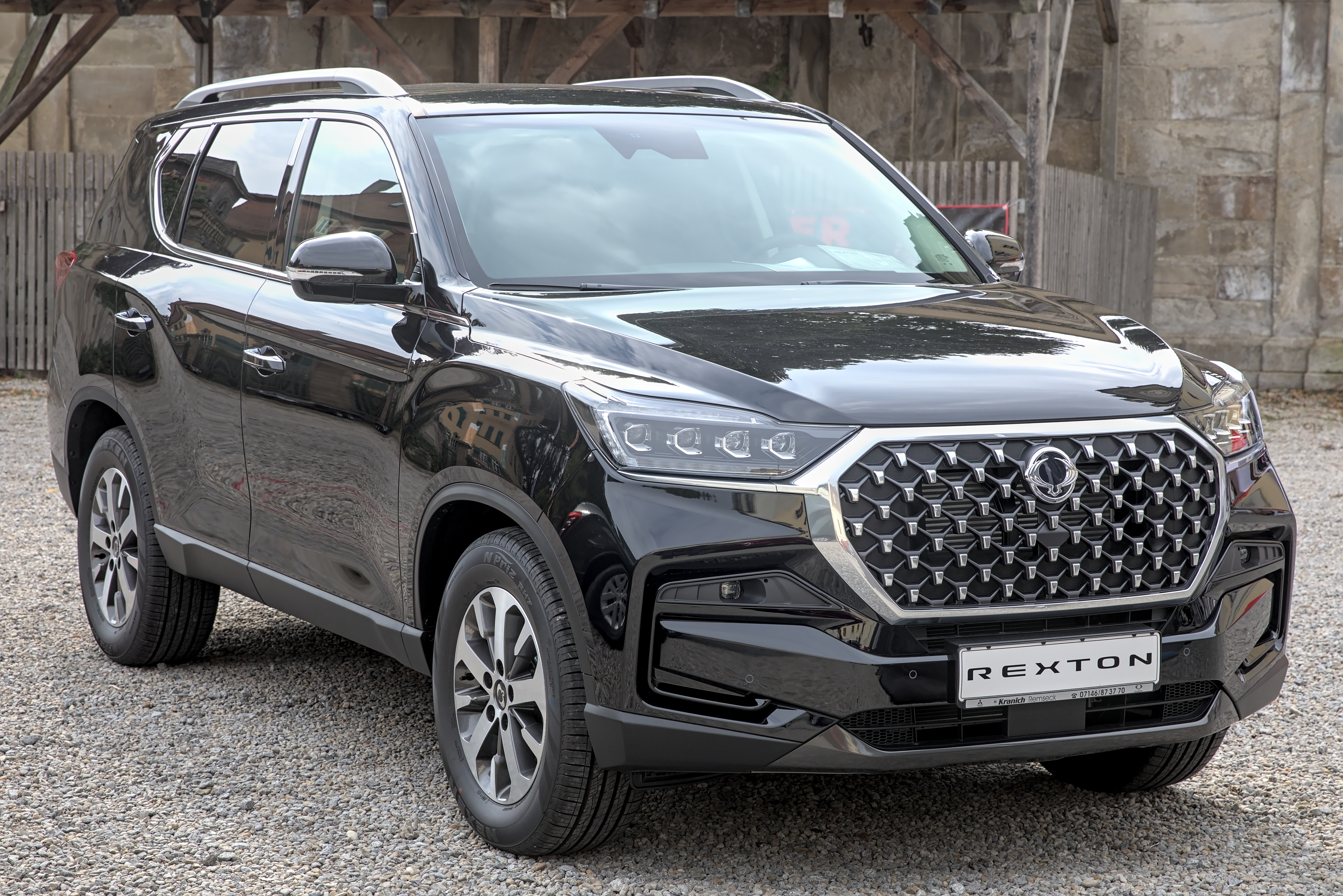
Y450 (facelift) front view

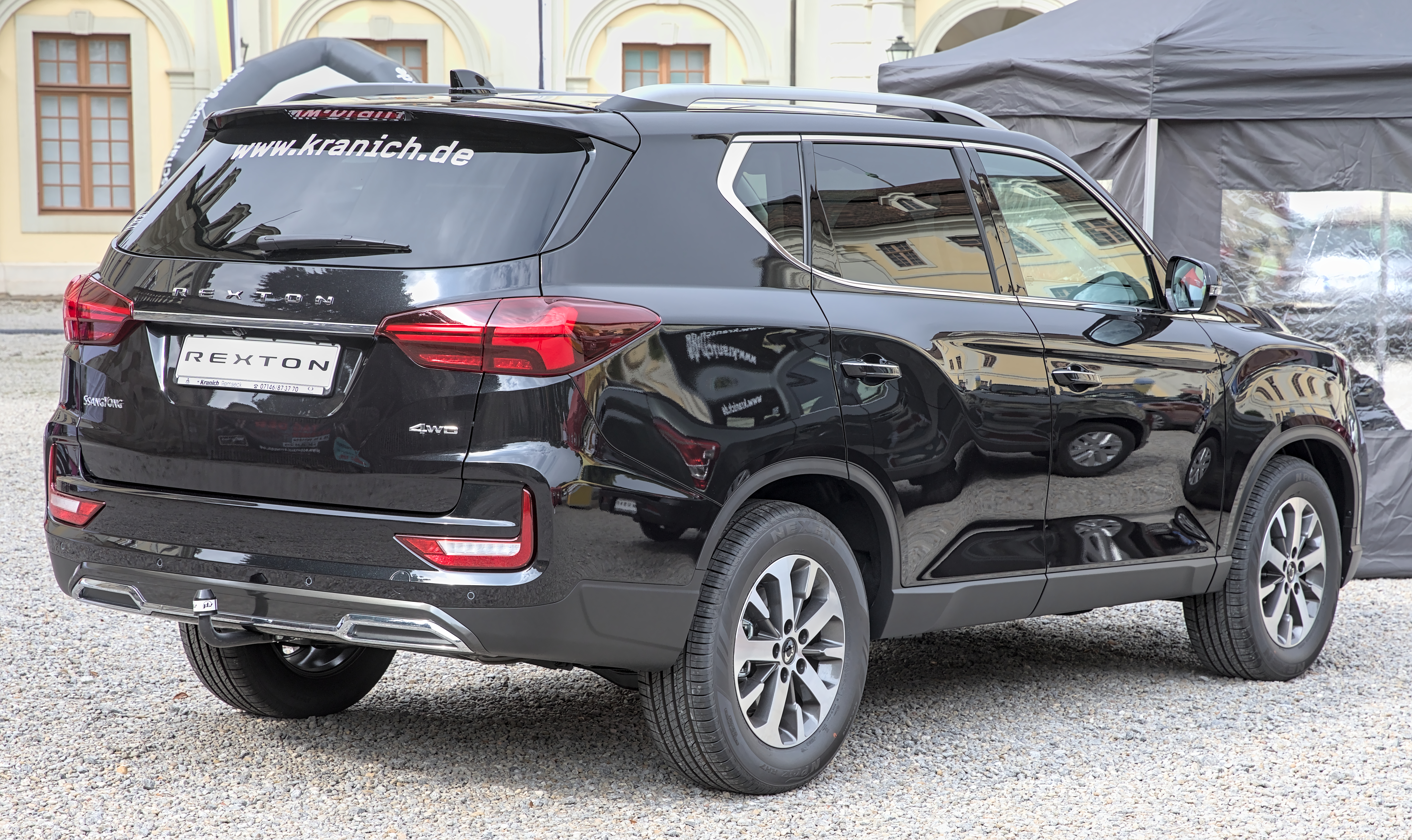
Y450 (facelift) rear view
