= SsangYong Musso =

KGM Musso
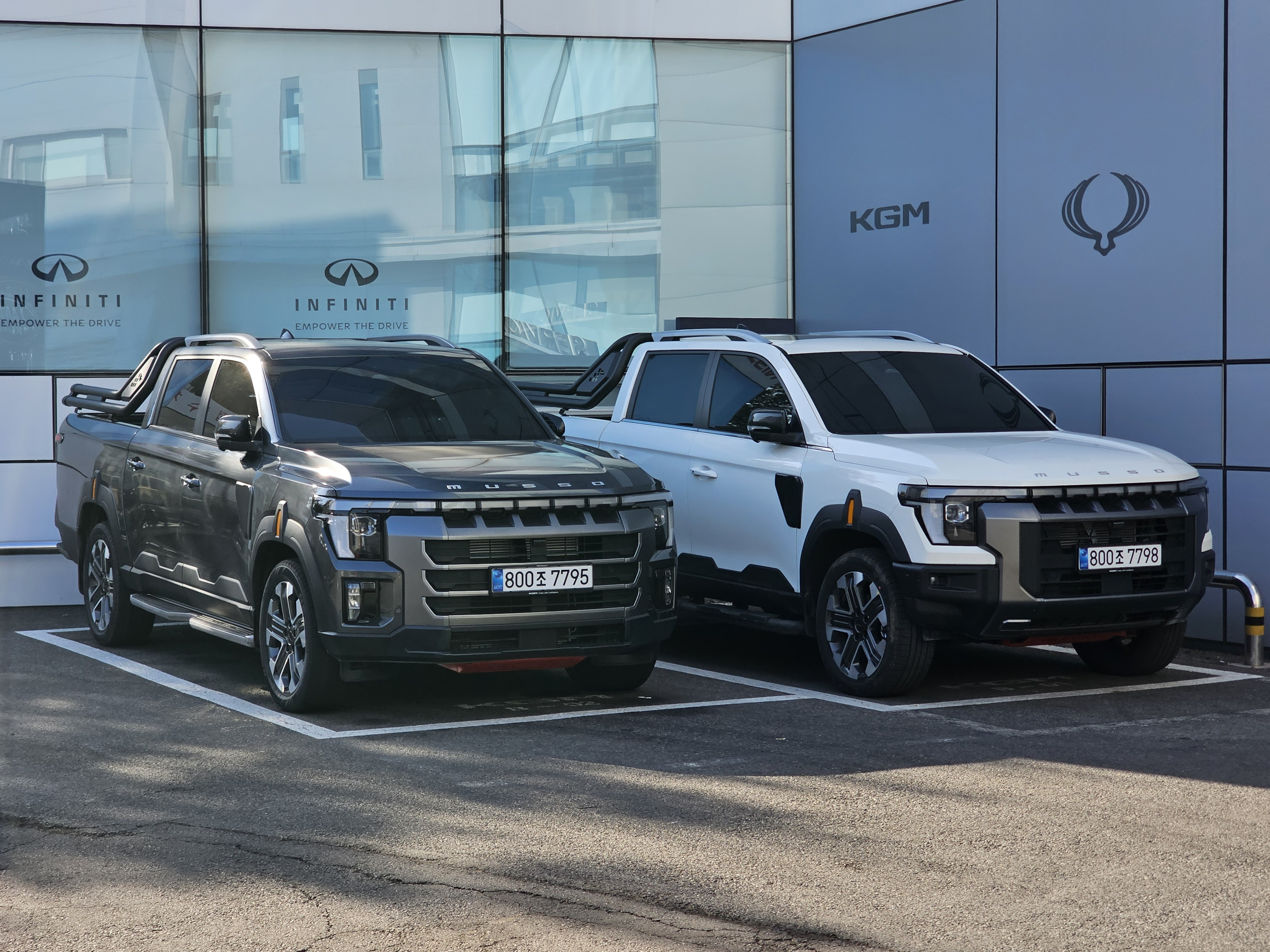

Overview
- Manufacturer: SsangYong Motor (1993–2005, 2018–2023); KGM (2023–present)
- Also called: SsangYong Musso (1993–2005, 2018–2024); KGM SsangYong Musso (2024–present)
- Production: 1993–2005; 2018–present

Body and chassis
- Class: Mid-size SUV (1993–2005); Mid-size pickup truck (2002–2011, 2018–present)
- Body style: 5-door SUV (1993–2005); 4-door double cab (2002–2005, 2018–present)
- Layout: Front-engine, rear-wheel-drive; Front-engine, four-wheel-drive
- Chassis: Body-on-frame

The KGM Musso, previously marketed as the SsangYong Musso (Korean: 쌍용 무쏘) is a mid-size SUV or pickup truck produced since 1993 by the South Korean automaker KG Mobility, formerly SsangYong Motor.

The Musso SUV was a result of collaboration between SsangYong and Daimler-Benz. The car's design was styled by Ken Greenley. The car has a double cab pick-up version named Musso Sports. The SUV was produced from 1993 to 2005, and the pick-up produced from 2002 to 2005.

At the 2018 Geneva Motor Show, SsangYong's new pickup truck was revealed, with the Musso nameplate. It features SsangYong's new body-on-frame platform, which it shares with the SsangYong/KGM Rexton.

== Musso SUV (FJ; 1993) ==
SsangYong Musso (SUV)
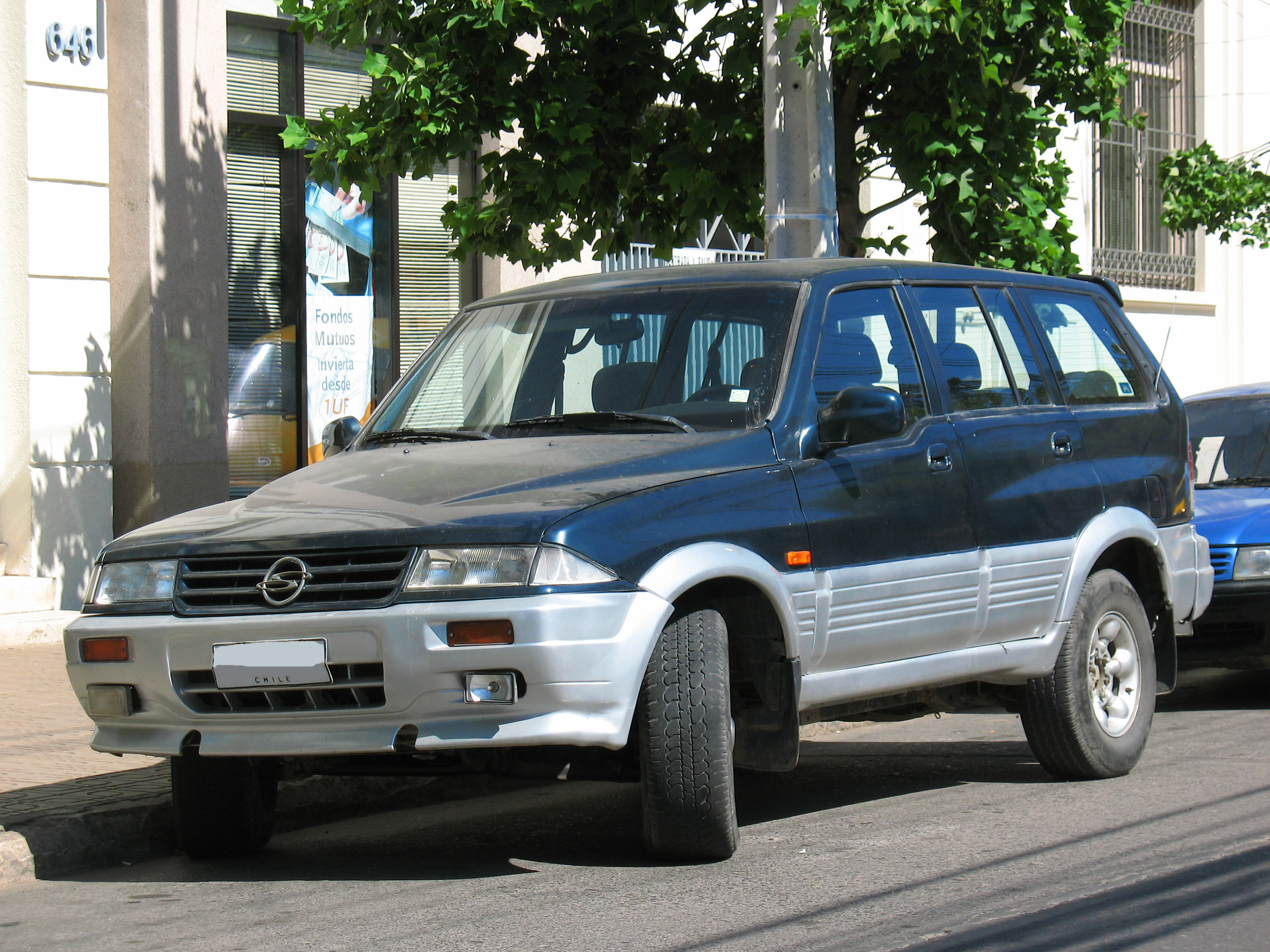

Overview
- Manufacturer: SsangYong
- Also called: Dadi Musso (China); Daewoo Musso (Germany, Iceland); Morattab Musso (Iran); SsangYong MJ (France); TagAZ Road Partner (Russia); SsangYong Korando Family (Spain)
- Production: 1993–2005 (South Korea); 1997–2005 (Vietnam); 2001–2006 (China); 2003–2007 (Iran); 2008–2011 (Russia)
- Assembly: Pyeongtaek, South Korea; Taganrog, Russia (TagAZ); Tehran, Iran (Morattab); Ho Chi Minh City, Vietnam (Mekong Auto); Jakarta, Indonesia (Indobuana Autoraya)
- Designer: Ken Greenley

Body and chassis
- Class: Mid-size SUV; Compact luxury SUV
- Body style: 5-door SUV
- Related: SsangYong Musso Sports

Powertrain
- Engine: 2.3 L M111 I4 (petrol); 3.2 L M104 I6 (petrol); 2.3 L OM601 I4 (diesel); 2.9 L OM602 I5 (diesel)

Dimensions
- Wheelbase: 2,630 mm (103.5 in)
- Length: 4,580 mm (180.3 in) (1993–1998); 4,620 mm (181.9 in) (1998–2005)
- Width: 1,850 mm (73 in) (1993–1998); 1,864 mm (73.4 in) (1998–2005)
- Height: 1,735 mm (68.3 in)

Chronology
- Predecessor: SsangYong Korando Family
- Successor: for SsangYong SUV; SsangYong Rexton; SsangYong Kyron; SsangYong Actyon; for General Motors KR; Daewoo Winstorm (Daewoo Musso)

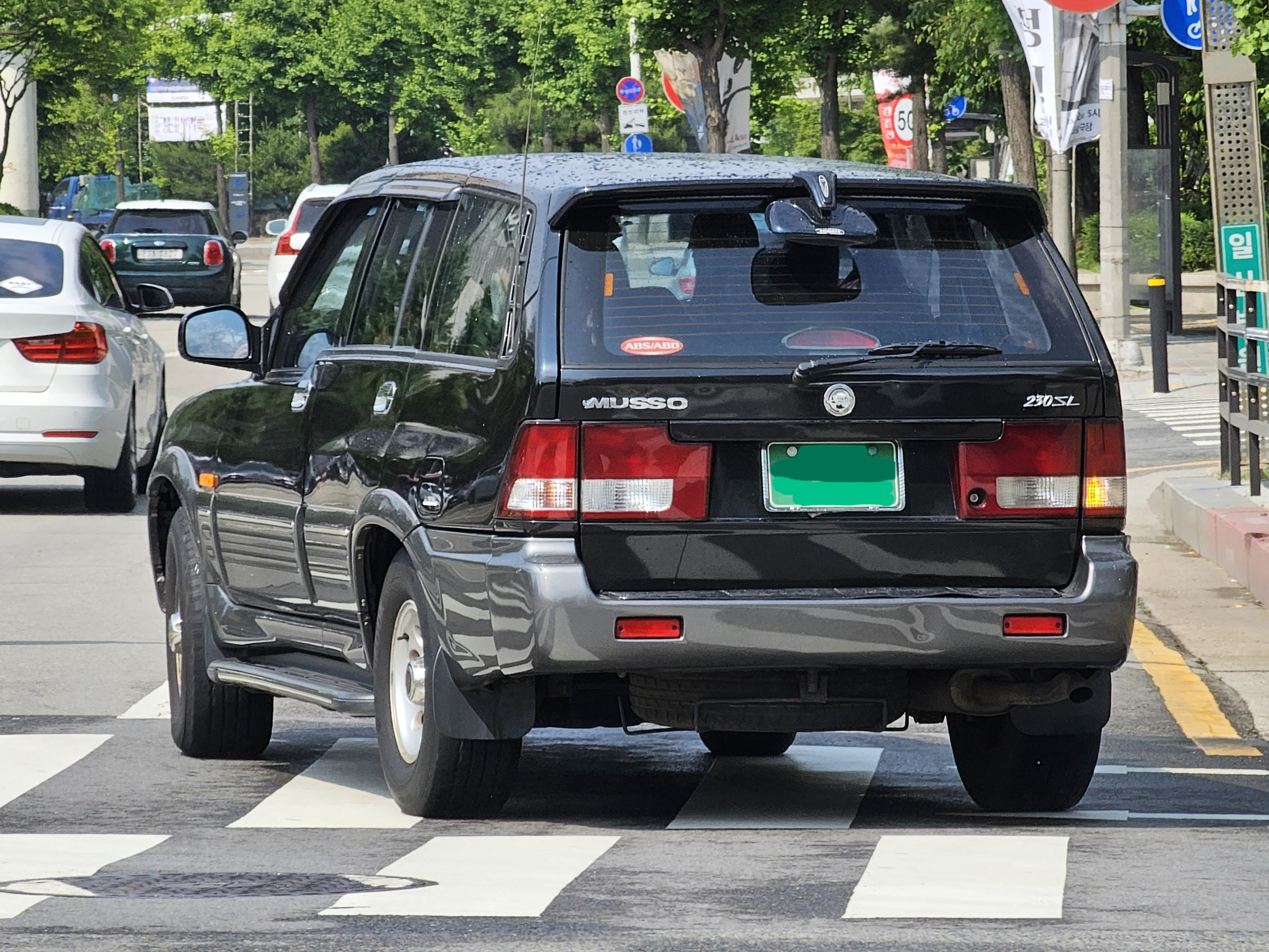

First produced in 1993, the Musso SUV was available with either a petrol 2.8 and 3.2-litre inline six-cylinder Mercedes-Benz M104 engine, a Mercedes-Benz M111 engine 2.3-litre inline four-cylinder petrol engine, or a 2.3-litre four-cylinder and 2.9-litre five-cylinder diesel engines (Mercedes-Benz OM601 and OM602) with natural aspiration or turbo intercooler (from 1997). The car was designed by Briton Ken Greenley and received the Auto Design Award from the Birmingham Auto Show hosted in 1994 and 1996. Also known for its off-road abilities, the vehicle won the Rallye des Pharaons for 4WD vehicles in October 1994. A facelifted version has been available since 1998.

The Musso seats five people, a folding trunk seat is available in rare models for a total of seven. The wheels are fit for off-road driving, similar to its smaller sibling, the Korando. The SsangYong Musso Sports, a Musso variant with a truck bed, was released in later years.

The Musso is available in Iran as Musso, produced by Morattab Khodro Co. (since 2003). It was sold in Vietnam by Mekong Auto Corporation from 1997 to 2005.

=== TagAZ Road Partner ===
Russian automotive assembly TagAZ plant in Taganrog produced the Musso from 2008 to 2011 as TagAZ Road Partner. The car was facelifted in 2009.

=== Daewoo Musso ===
The Musso had also been produced for the UK market by Ssangyong from 1995 until 1999, when Daewoo Motors took over. The car was rebranded as the Daewoo Musso, keeping most of Greenley's body style with a notable change being the new front grille, more suited to Daewoo's styling. The Daewoo Musso was also sold in Germany.

Production for the Daewoo Musso ended in the latter half of 2002, 2 years before Daewoo was rebadged by General Motors.

== Musso Sports (P100; 2002) ==
SsangYong Musso Sports
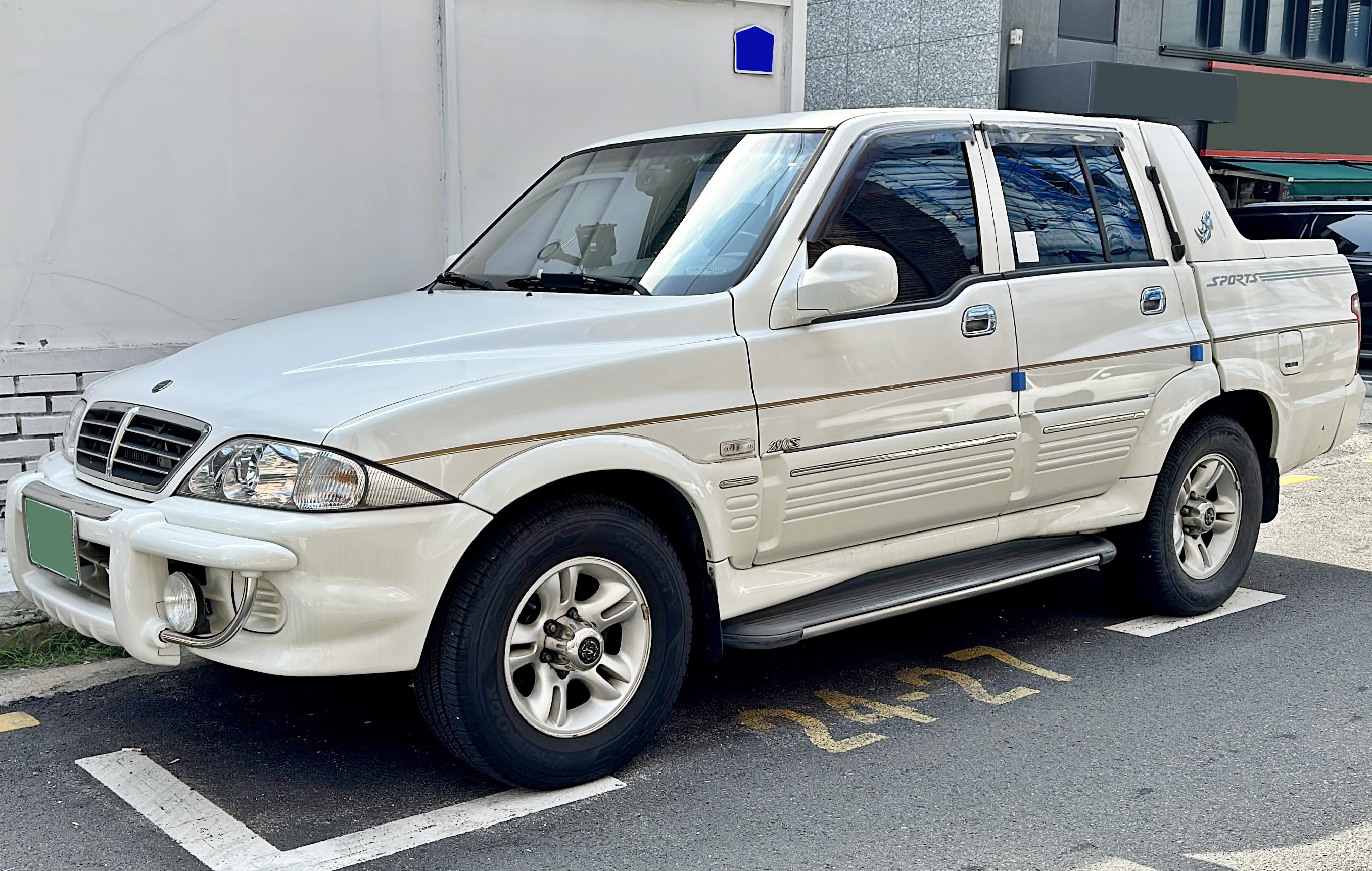

Overview
- Manufacturer: Ssangyong
- Also called: SsangYong Sports; SsangYong Musso SUT; Daewoo Musso Sports
- Production: 2002–2006

Body and chassis
- Class: SUT
- Body style: 4-door double cab

Chronology
- Successor: for SsangYong; SsangYong Actyon Sports; SsangYong Musso (Q200 series)

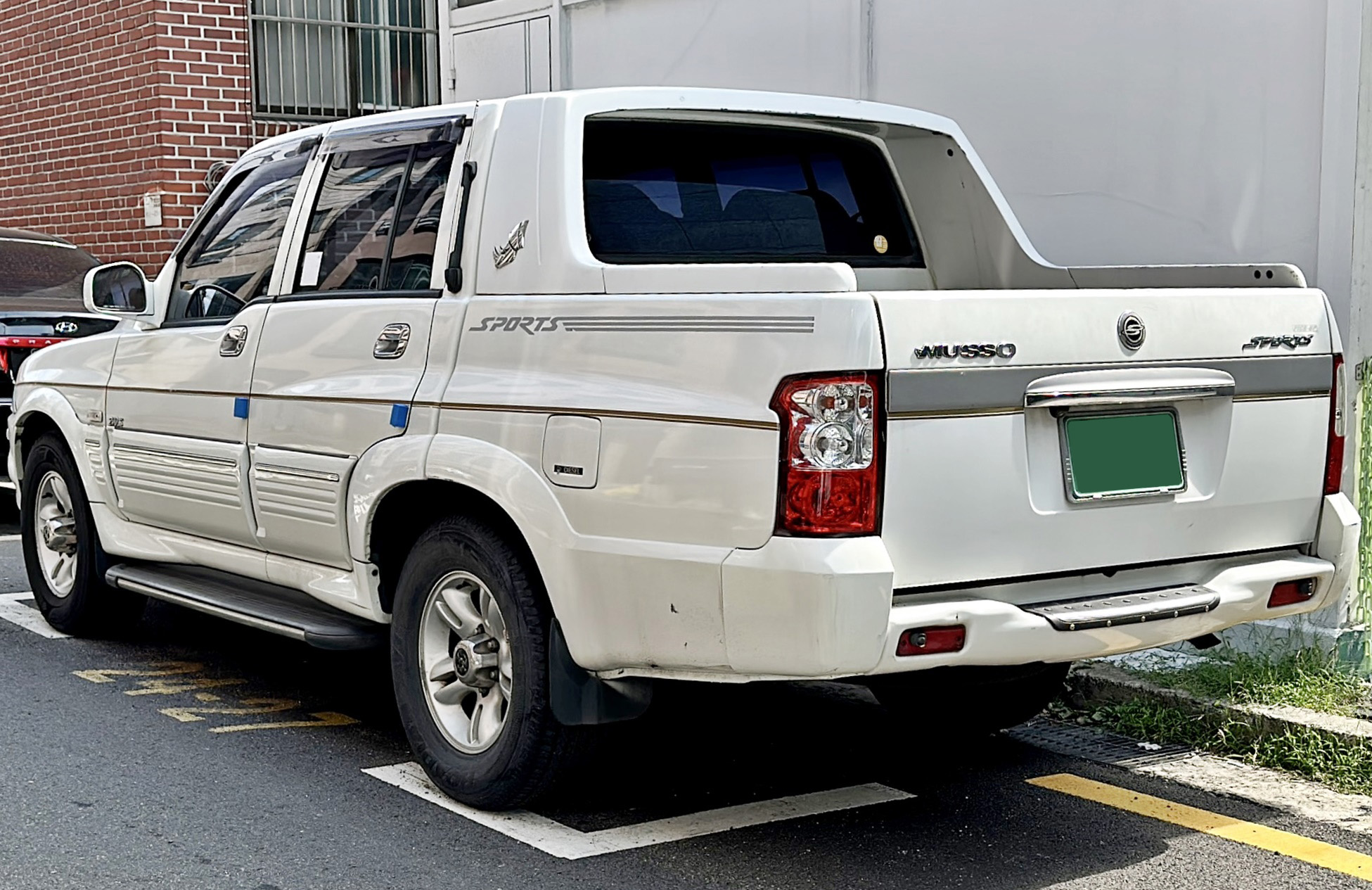

The P100 series Musso Sports is a dual cab pickup version of the Musso SUV produced from 2002 to 2006. It features a Mercedes-Benz-designed engine, gearbox and five seats. Later models also had a turbo diesel option as well as others like a canopy, 'fins', extra tail lights, a chrome trim and an extra row of wheels to hold more weight.

== Musso Pick-up ==
=== First generation (Q200; 2018) ===
SsangYong/KGM Musso (pick-up)
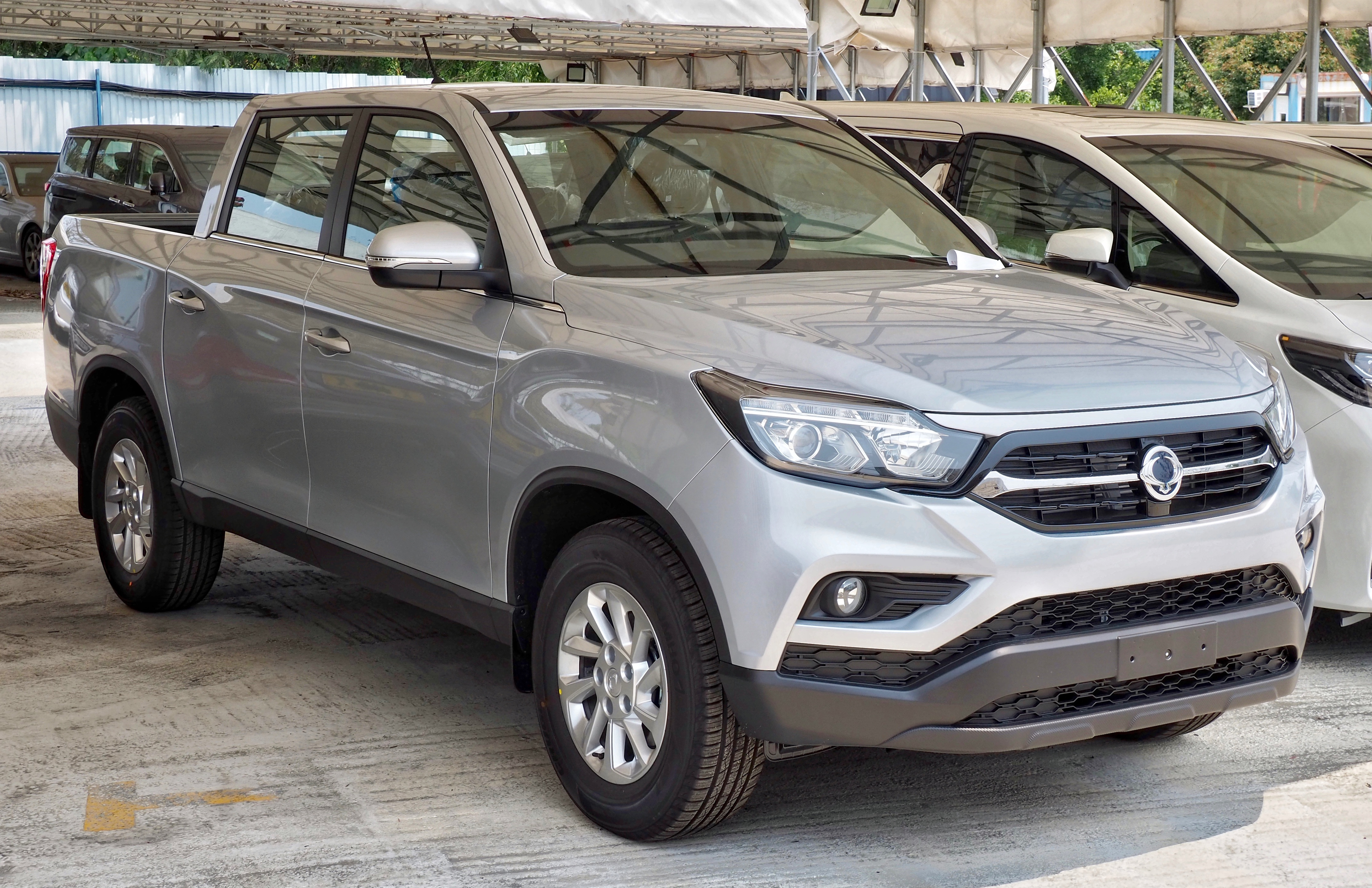

Overview
- Manufacturer: SsangYong Motor (2018–2023); KG Mobility (2023–2026)
- Also called: SsangYong Rexton Sports (Italy, South Korea and Taiwan); KGM Musso Sports SsangYong Rhino (New Zealand); SsangYong Rexton Sports Khan (South Korea); KGM Musso Khan; SsangYong Musso Grand; SsangYong Musso XLV (Australia)
- Production: 2018–2026
- Assembly: Pyeongtaek, South Korea; Saveh, Iran (Illia Automobile Industries)

Body and chassis
- Class: Mid-size pickup truck
- Body style: 4-door double cab
- Related: SsangYong Rexton

Powertrain
- Engine: 2.0 L e-XGDI 200T turbo GDI I4 (petrol); 2.2 L e-XDI 220 I4-T (diesel)
- Transmission: 6-speed manual 6-speed Aisin automatic

Dimensions
- Wheelbase: 3,100 mm (122.0 in); 3,210 mm (126.4 in) (Grand)
- Length: 5,095 mm (200.6 in) 5,405 mm (212.8 in) (Grand) 5,409 mm (213.0 in) (XLV)
- Width: 1,950 mm (77 in)
- Height: 1,840 mm (72 in); 1,855 mm (73.0 in) (Grand/XLV)

Chronology
- Predecessor: SsangYong Actyon Sports

The Q200 series Musso, also called the Rexton Sports (Korean: 렉스턴 스포츠) in Italy (the word “Musso” means “donkey” in Venetian and also corresponds to the first syllables of the surname of the fascist dictator Benito Mussolini), South Korea and Taiwan, is a pickup truck which debuted to the Korean market and global market at the Geneva Motor Show in March 2018. The car featured SsangYong's new body-on-frame platform using Advanced High Strength Steel (AHSS), which it shared with the second generation SsangYong Rexton.

The Musso is offered with a choice of 225 hp (168 kW) 2.0 L e-XGDI 200T petrol turbo engine or 181 hp (135 kW) 2.2 L e-XDI 220 diesel engine which it shares with the Rexton and is available in two-wheel or part-time four-wheel drive. It is equipped with AISIN 6-speed automatic transmission or 6-speed manual transmission. The Musso pickup also includes Five-link suspension with optional Locking differential (LD). In Australia, the long wheelbase model XLV is offered with rear leaf suspension in the base ELX model as standard and as an option in the mid spec Ultimate. In the United Kingdom, the long wheelbase model is known as the Musso Rhino, using the New Zealand market model name as a top of the range trim level.

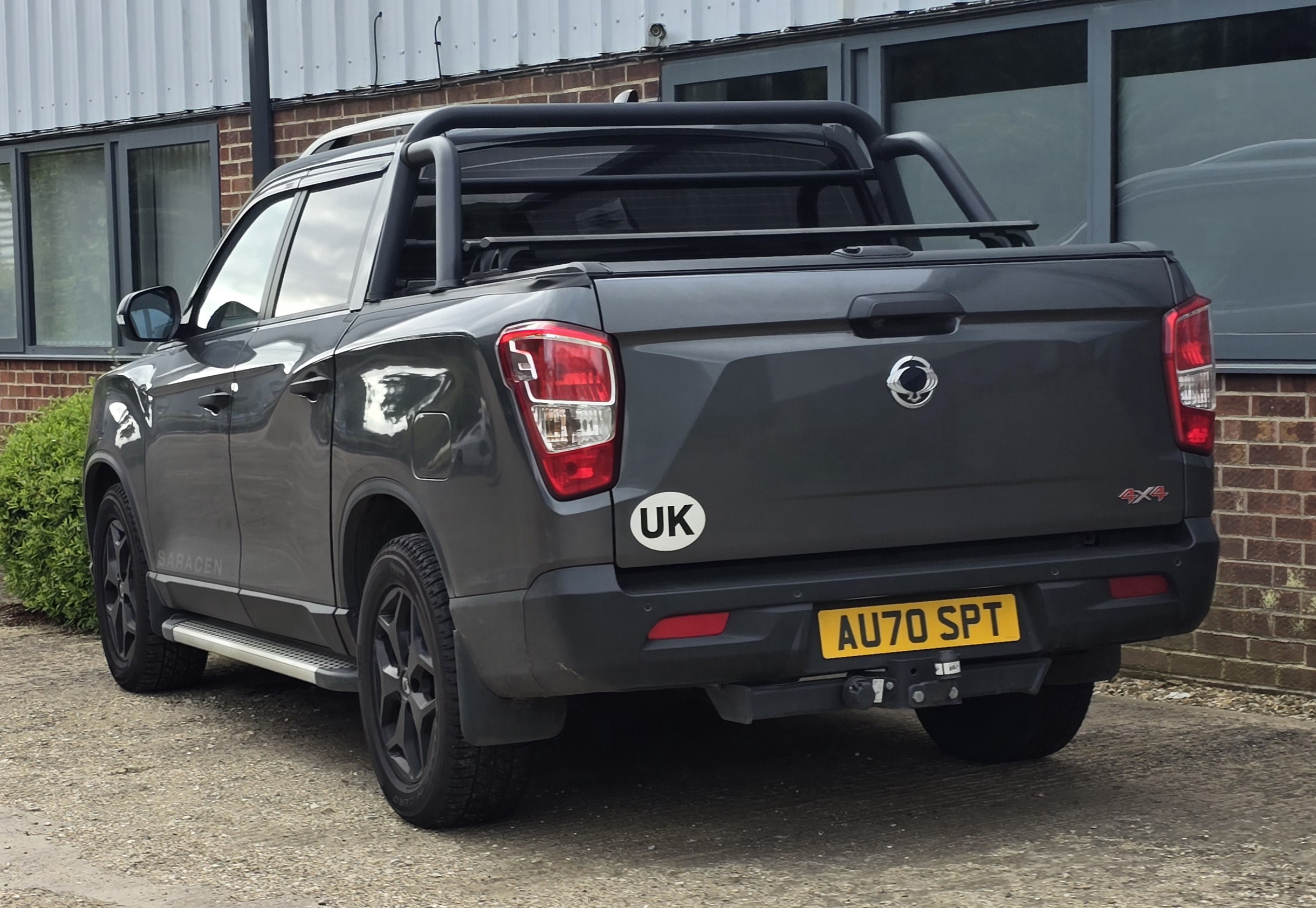
Rear

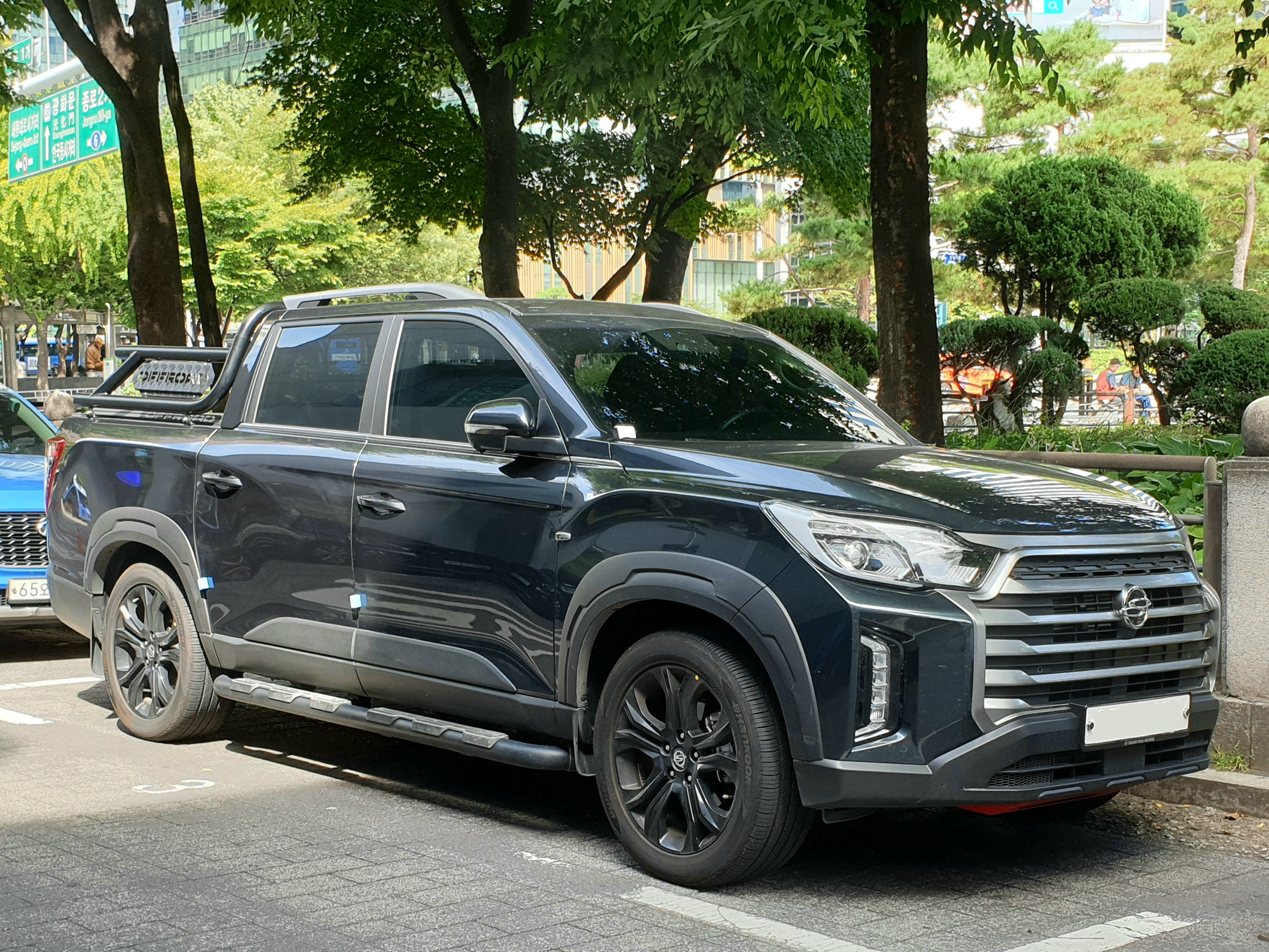
Facelift, Front

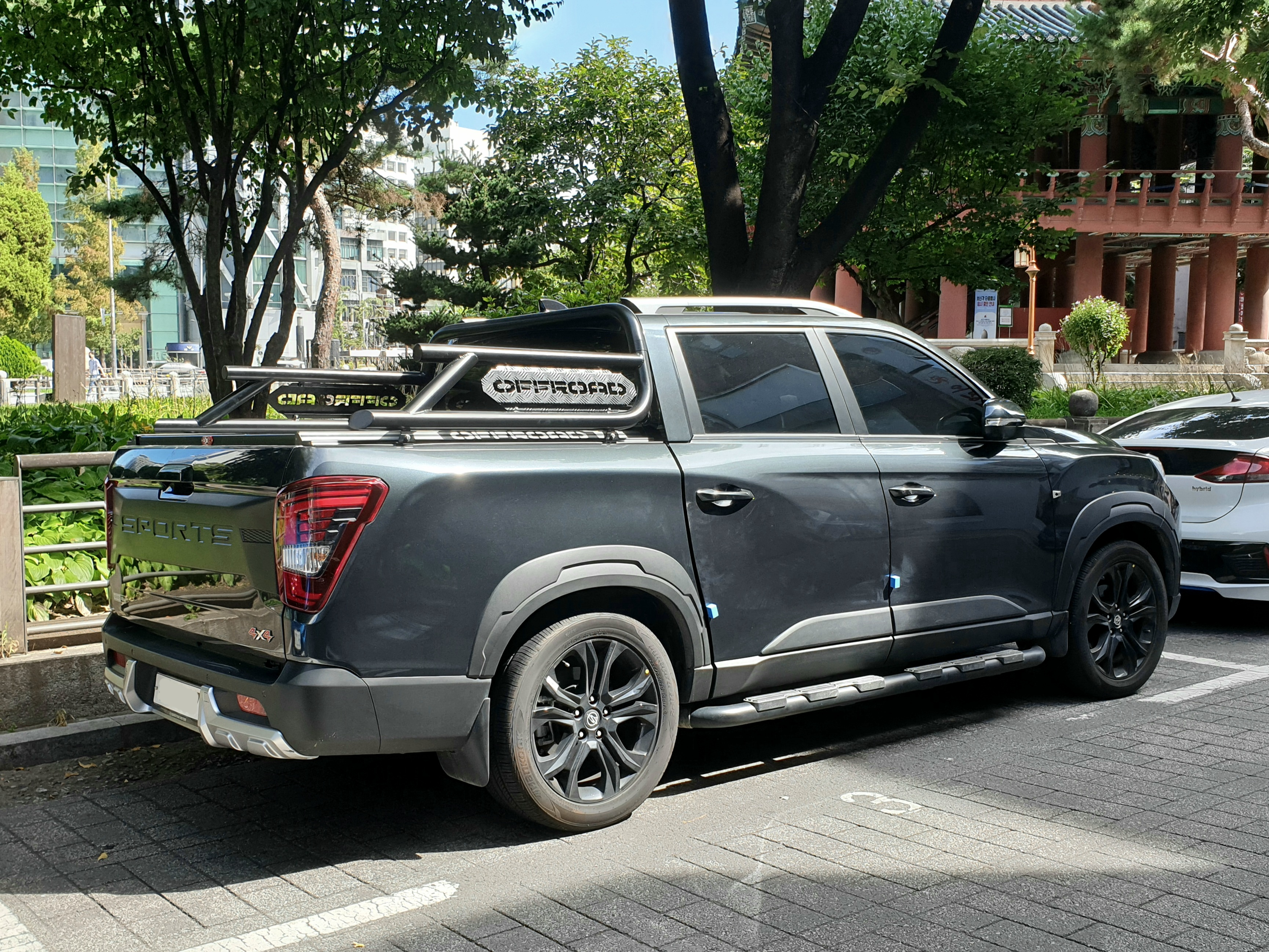
Facelift, Rear

==== Safety ====
The Musso pickup equipped with six airbags, It also features smart safety driving system including Autonomous Emergency Brake System (AEBS), Blind Spot Detection (BSD) and Rear Cross-Traffic Alert (RCTA).

==== Concept ====
Unveiled in May 2023, the Rexton Sports Culmen previews an upcoming facelift for the Musso pickup.

=== Second generation (Q300; 2026) ===
KGM Musso
- KGM Musso Grand Style

Overview
- Manufacturer: KG Mobility
- Production: 2026–present
- Assembly: South Korea: Pyeongtaek, Gyeonggi

Body and chassis
- Class: Mid-size pickup truck
- Body style: 4-door double cab

Powertrain
- Engine: 2.0 L e-XGDI 200T turbo GDI I4 (petrol); 2.2 L e-XDI 220 I4-T (diesel)
- Transmission: 6-speed manual 6-speed Aisin automatic

Dimensions
- Wheelbase: 3,100 mm (122.0 in); 3,210 mm (126.4 in) (Grand)
- Length: 5,150 mm (203 in); 5,460 mm (215.0 in) (Grand)
- Width: 1,950 mm (77 in)
- Height: 1,845–1,865 mm (72.6–73.4 in); 1,855–1,875 mm (73.0–73.8 in) (Grand)

Chronology
- Predecessor: SsangYong/KGM Musso (Q200)

The Q300 series KGM Musso (Korean: KGM 무쏘) which debuted to Korean market in December 2025.

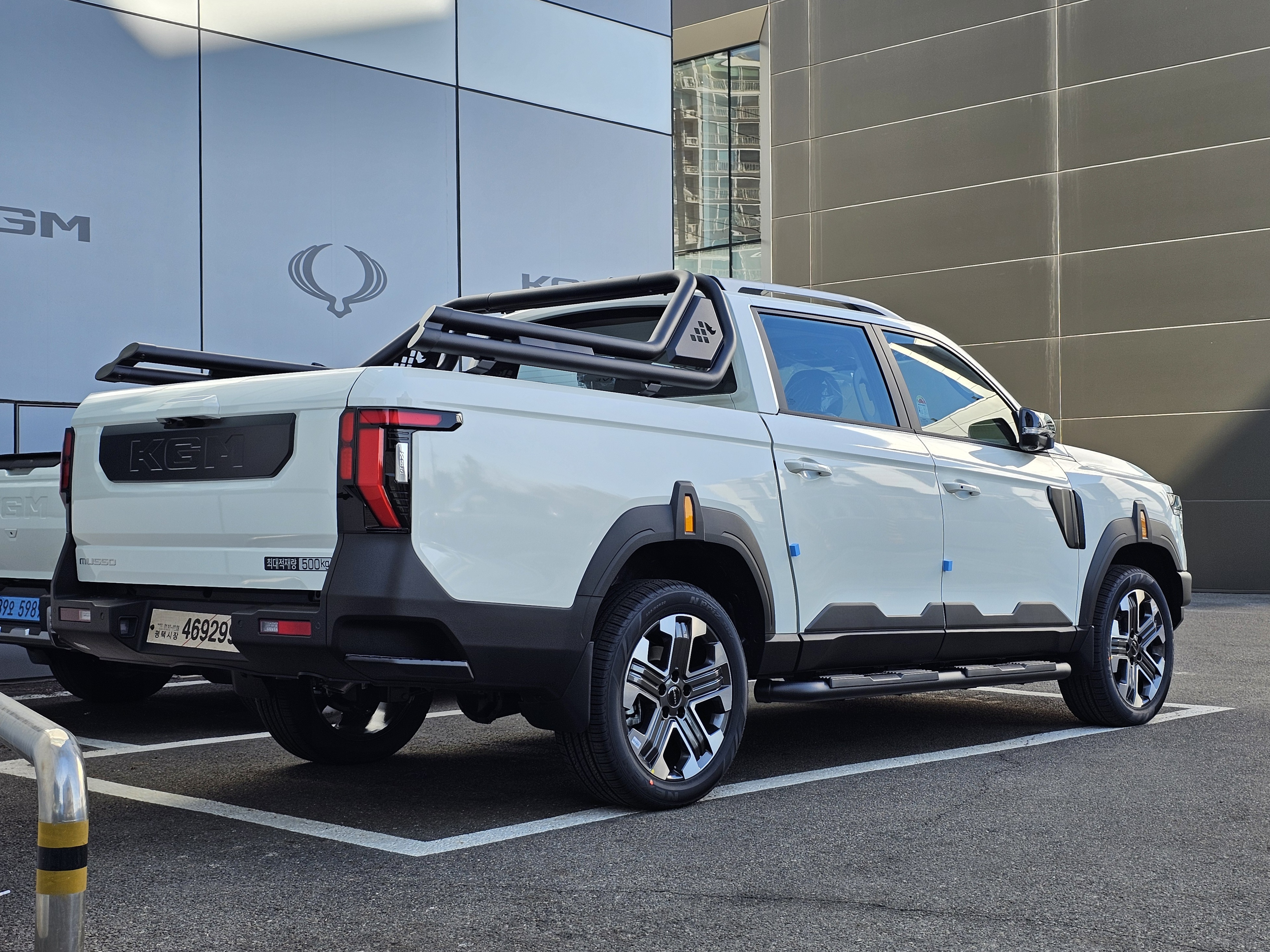
Rear

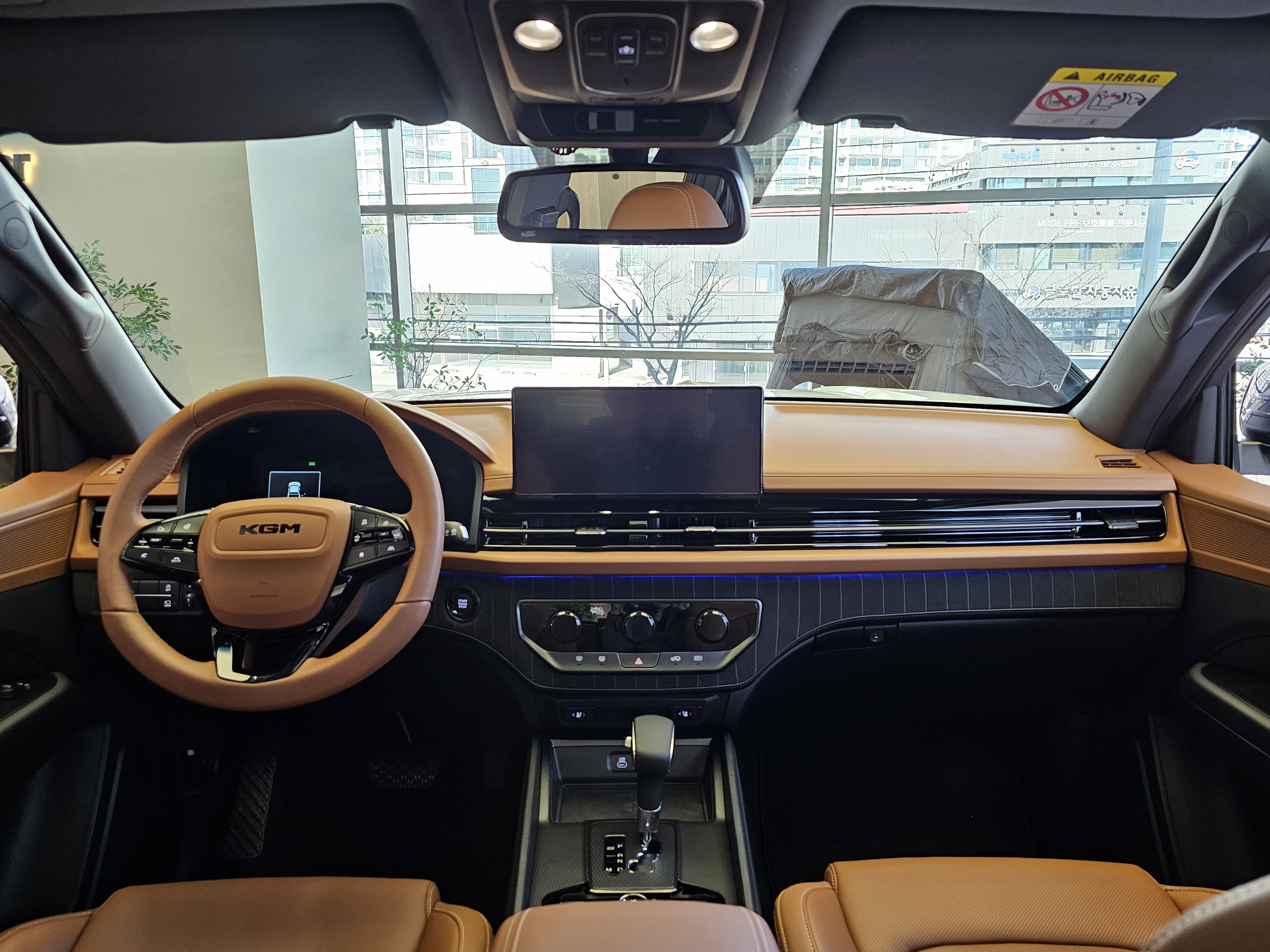
Interior
