= Seoul Motor Show =

Biennial auto show in Seoul, South Korea

SEOUL MOBILITY SHOW 서울모빌리티쇼
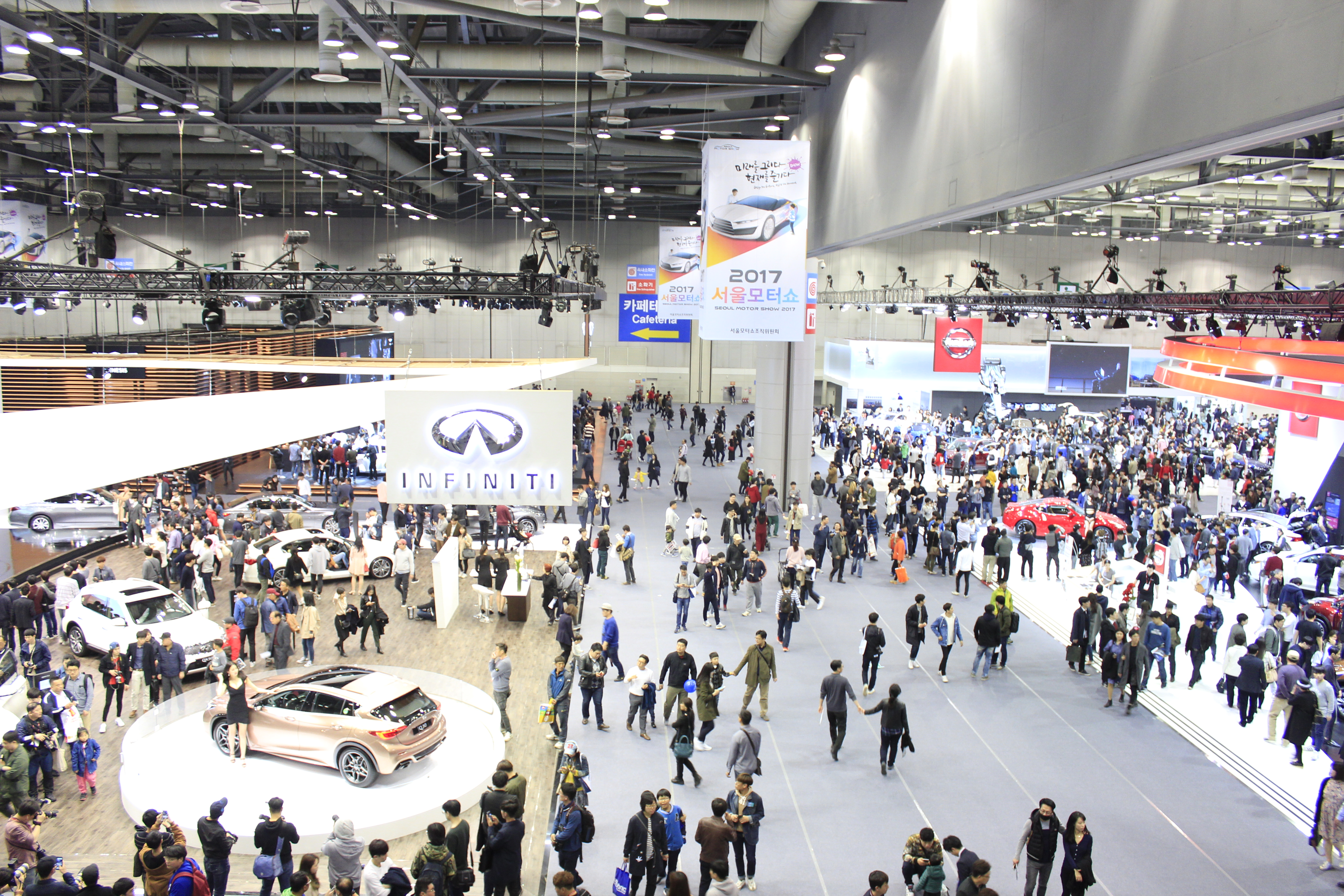
- Status: Active
- Genre: Auto show
- Venue: KINTEX
- Location: Goyang, South Korea
- Country: South Korea
- Inaugurated: 1995–present
- Most recent: 3 April 2025 – 13 April 2025
- Website: www.motorshow.or.kr/eng/main/main.php/

The Seoul Mobility Show (Korean: 서울모빌리티쇼) is a biennial auto show held at KINTEX (Korea International Exhibition Center), Goyang, Gyeonggi-do. Hosted by the Korea Automobile Manufacturers Association, it is recognized as an international show by the Organisation Internationale des Constructeurs d'Automobiles. It is the 1st largest auto show in Asia. Until 2019, the show was called the Seoul Motor Show.

== History ==
The Seoul Motor Show, predecessor of the Seoul Mobility Show, was held in odd-numbered years until 1999, when it was held for the third time, and the fourth time was held three years later in 2002. It has been held in odd-numbered years since 2005, when it was held for the fifth time. Since 2005, the venue has moved from COEX in Seoul to KINTEX in Goyang, Gyeonggi Province.

The Korea Automobile Manufacturers Association changed the name of the show to the Seoul Mobility Show in 2021.

== By year ==
=== 2025 ===
The 15th Seoul Mobility Show was held from April 3 to April 13, 2025, in the KINTEX Hall 1 to 5. The country's brand Kia, Hyundai and Genesis participated in this show.

- Hyundai Ioniq 6 Facelift
- Hyundai Nexo NH2
- Hyundai Palisade High Roof
- Hyundai Insteroid Concept
- Kia Tasman Weekender
- Genesis X Gran Coupe
- Genesis X Gran Convertible

=== 2023 ===
The 14th Seoul Mobility Show was held from March 30 to April 9, 2023, in the KINTEX Hall 1 to 5. The country's brand Kia, Hyundai, Genesis and Ssangyong (KG Mobility or KGM) participated in this show and expanded to UAM and mobility companies. Ssangyong Motor's electric SUV, the Torres EVX, has been unveiled for the first time in the world. BMW is exhibiting the brand's first hydrogen fuel cell vehicle, the iX5 Hydrogen, for the first time in Korea.

- Hyundai Sonata DN8 F/L
- Hyundai Sonata DN8 Hybrid
- Hyundai Kona Electric
- Hyundai Casper/Inster in Art Show Car
- Hyundai Pavise
- Kia EV9
- Genesis X Convertible
- KGM Torres EVX
- KGM Torres TX
- KGM Torres EVT
- KGM KR10 Prototype
- KGM F100 Prototype
- KGM Rexton 4-seater VIP show car
- Mercedes-Benz EQE 500 4MATIC SUV
- Mercedes-Benz AMG Sl 63 4MATIC+
- Mercedes-Benz AMG G63 K-Edition20
- Mercedes-Benz Project Mondo G Moncler
- Mercedes-Benz Project Maybach
- BMW iX5 Hydrogen
- BMW M3 Touring
- BMW XM
- Mini Vision Urbanat
- Mini Electric Resolution Edition
- Mini Convertible Seaside Edition
- Porsche Vision 357
- Porsche 356
- Porsche 963 LMDh
- Porsche Mission R
- Porsche 911 RSR Pink Pig
- Porsche 911 Edition 50th Anniversary Porsche Design Targa 4
- Tesla Model S Plaid
- Tesla Model X Plaid
- Alpha Rex
- Alpha Wolf
- Ineos Grenadier

* Bold text is world premiere.

=== 2021 ===
The 13th Seoul Mobility Show was initially scheduled to run from April 1 to April 11, but in October 2020 it was changed July 1 to July 11 and postponed again from November 25 to December 5 due to the COVID-19 pandemic in South Korea. Only KINTEX Halls 6 to 10 were used in this show.

This show changed its name from Seoul Motor Show to Seoul Mobility Show. Due to the absence of GM Korea, Ssangyong, Renault Samsung and a lot of KAIDA companies, Hyundai Motor Company (Hyundai, Kia, Genesis) was the only Korean company to participate in this show.

- Kia Niro (SG2) – World Premiere
- Hyundai Universe Mobile Office
- Hyundai Staria Camper/Limousine
- Hyundai Casper
- Genesis Electrified GV70 – Korea Premiere

=== 2019 ===
The 12th Seoul Motor Show ran from March 29 to April 7. Tesla took part in the 2019 Seoul Motor show.

- Hyundai Sonata 1.6 Turbo
- Hyundai Veloster N with "N Performance" parts
- Kia "Imagine by Kia" concept (Asian debut)
- Kia Mohave Masterpiece concept
- Kia SP Signature concept
- Renault Samsung XM3 Inspire concept
- Jaguar XE Facelift (Asian debut)

=== 2017 ===
The 11th SEOUL MOBILITY SHOW ran from March 30 to April 9.

=== 2015 ===
The 10th SEOUL MOBILITY SHOW ran from April 2 to April 12. The number of visitors was estimated at 615,000. A total of 190 companies participated, including 32 complete vehicle brands, 131 parts and supplies companies, 18 tuning companies, and 4 motorcycle companies. The exhibition area is 91,141 m2. Seven models were unveiled for the first time in the world, nine were unveiled for the first time in Asia, and 41 were unveiled for the first time in Korea. A total of 370 vehicles were exhibited.

=== 2013 ===
The 9th SEOUL MOBILITY SHOW ran from March 29 to April 7.

- Hyundai Equus Limousine by Hermès
- Hyundai E4U Concept
- Hyundai HND-9 Venace Concept
- Hyundai ix35 FCEV
- Hyundai Trago Xcient 6x2 Tractor
- Kia CUB Concept
- Kia K3 Euro
- Kia K3 Convertible "Kia Tigers"
- SsangYong Chairman W Summit
- SsangYong LIV-1 Concept
- Samsung QM3 Concept
- Samsung SM5 XE TCE
- Samsung SM3 Z.E.

=== 2011 ===
Period: March 31 – April 10

- Chevrolet Miray Concept
- Hyundai Blue2 (HND-6) Concept
- Kia Naimo Concept
- Kia K5 Hybrid
- Samsung SM7 Concept
- SsangYong Chairman H
- SsangYong KEV2 Concept
- Peugeot 508GT HDi
- Tata Daewoo Prima Concept

=== 2009 ===
Period: April 2–12

- Hyundai Avante LPG
- Hyundai Genesis Drift
- Hyundai Genesis Prada
- Hyundai HND-4 Blue Will Concept
- Hyundai Equus
- Kia KND-5 Concept
- Kia Forte LPI Hybrid
- Kia Sorento
- Samsung eMX Concept
- SsangYong Chairman
- SsangYong C200 Aero Concept
- SsangYong C200 Eco Hybrid Concept
- Samsung SM3

=== 2007 ===
The 6th SEOUL MOBILITY SHOW ran from April 5 to April 15.

- Daewoo G2X Concept
- Daewoo L4X Concept
- Hyundai HND-3 Veloster Concept
- Hyundai H-1
- Hyundai FD Wagon
- Kia KND-4 Concept
- SsangYong Kyron
- SsangYong WZ Concept
- Samsung QMX Concept

=== 2005 ===
Period: April 28 – May 8. The first SEOUL MOBILITY SHOW held in KINTEX.

- Daewoo T2X Concept
- Daewoo Lacetti Sport Wagon
- Daewoo Lacetti WTCC
- Daewoo Statesman
- Kia Bongo
- Kia Pride
- Kia Carnival / VQ
- Hyundai HCT 6×2 Concept
- SsangYong Chairman Limo Concept
- SsangYong SV-R Concept
- SsangYong XCT Concept
- SsangYong XMT Concept
- SsangYong Rodius Limo Concept
- Proto Motors Spirra

=== 2002 ===
Period: November 20–29

- ATT Invita
- Daewoo Flex Concept
- Daewoo Lacetti
- Daewoo Magnus
- Daewoo Oto Concept
- Hyundai Coupe Aero Concept
- Hyundai Santa Fe Mountaineer Concept
- Hyundai Starex Limousine
- Hyundai HIC Concept
- Kia Carnival Limousine Concept
- Kia Opirus
- Kia Regal / Magentis
- Samsung SM3
- Samsung SM3 Sport Prototype
- SsangYong Hemos Concept
- SsangYong Amao Concept
- SsangYong Crossut Concept
- SsangYong Musso Sports
- Proto Motors Spirra

=== 1999 ===
Period: May 11–18

- Daewoo DMS-1 Concept
- Daewoo Matiz Canvas Top Concept
- Daewoo Mirae Concept
- Hyundai FGV-2 Concept
- Hyundai Highland Concept
- Hyundai Santa Fe Concept
- Hyundai Starex Conversion
- Hyundai Trajet Concept
- Hyundai Tirol Concept
- Hyundai Tiburon Turbulence
- Hyundai Tutti Concept
- Kia Carens
- SsangYong Korando Camping Car Concept

=== 1997 ===
Period: April 24 – May 1

- Asia Motors ARV Concept
- Asia Motors Retona
- BMW 750 L7 Limousine
- Daewoo DEV-5 Concept
- Daewoo Joyster Concept
- Daewoo Shiraz Concept
- Daewoo Cabriolet Concept
- Daewoo Mantica Concept
- Daewoo Matiz Concept
- Daewoo Tacuma Concept
- Hyundai SLV Concept
- Hyundai HMX Concept
- Hyundai Tiburon Aluminum Body Concept
- Kia Genesis Concept
- Kia KMS-III Concept
- Kia KMX-4 Concept
- Kia Zenovia Concept
- Samsung SSC-1 Concept
- SsangYong Korando FRP Top Concept
- SsangYong W-Coupe Concept

=== 1995 ===
The 1st Seoul Motor Show was held from May 4 to 10, 1995. The general admission fee was 2,000 won, and approximately 700,000 visitors visited the show.

- Asia Motors Neo Mattina Concept
- Asia Motors Retona Concept
- Daewoo DACC-II Concept
- Daewoo No.1 Concept (Version 2)
- Daewoo No.2 Concept
- Hyundai FGV-1 Concept
- Hyundai HRV-21 Concept
- Kia KEV-4 Concept
- Kia KMX-3 Concept
- SsangYong CCR-1 Concept
- SsangYong CRS Concept
- SsangYong Solo III Concept
