= Alpha Wolf =

Alpha Wolf may refer to:

- Alpha (ethology), about the leader of a group of animals
- Alpha Wolf (band), an Australian nu metalcore band formed in 2013
- Alpha Wolf (pickup truck), an upcoming American compact electric pickup truck
- Alpha Wolf (born 1998), a ring name of Fernando Antonio Cornejo Soto, Mexican professional wrestler
