= Naimo =

Naimo may refer to:

== People ==
- Charlie Naimo, American association football coach
- Lee Naimo, member of the Australian musical comedy act The Axis of Awesome
- Rosario Naimo (born 1945), member of the Sicilian mafia

== Automobiles ==
- Kia Naimo, a 2011 South Korean subcompact crossover concept
