= KAMA =

KAMA or Kama may refer to:

- Korea Automobile Manufacturers Association
- KAMA (AM), a radio station (750 AM) licensed to El Paso, Texas, United States
- KAMA-FM, a radio station (104.9 FM) licensed to Deer Park, Texas, United States
- Kama, a professional wrestling gimmick portrayed by Charles Wright (wrestler)
- the ICAO code for Rick Husband Amarillo International Airport
- Kama, Sanskrit word for pleasure.
- Kama, a traditional Estonian, Finnish and Russian finely milled flour mixture
