= SsangYong Korando =

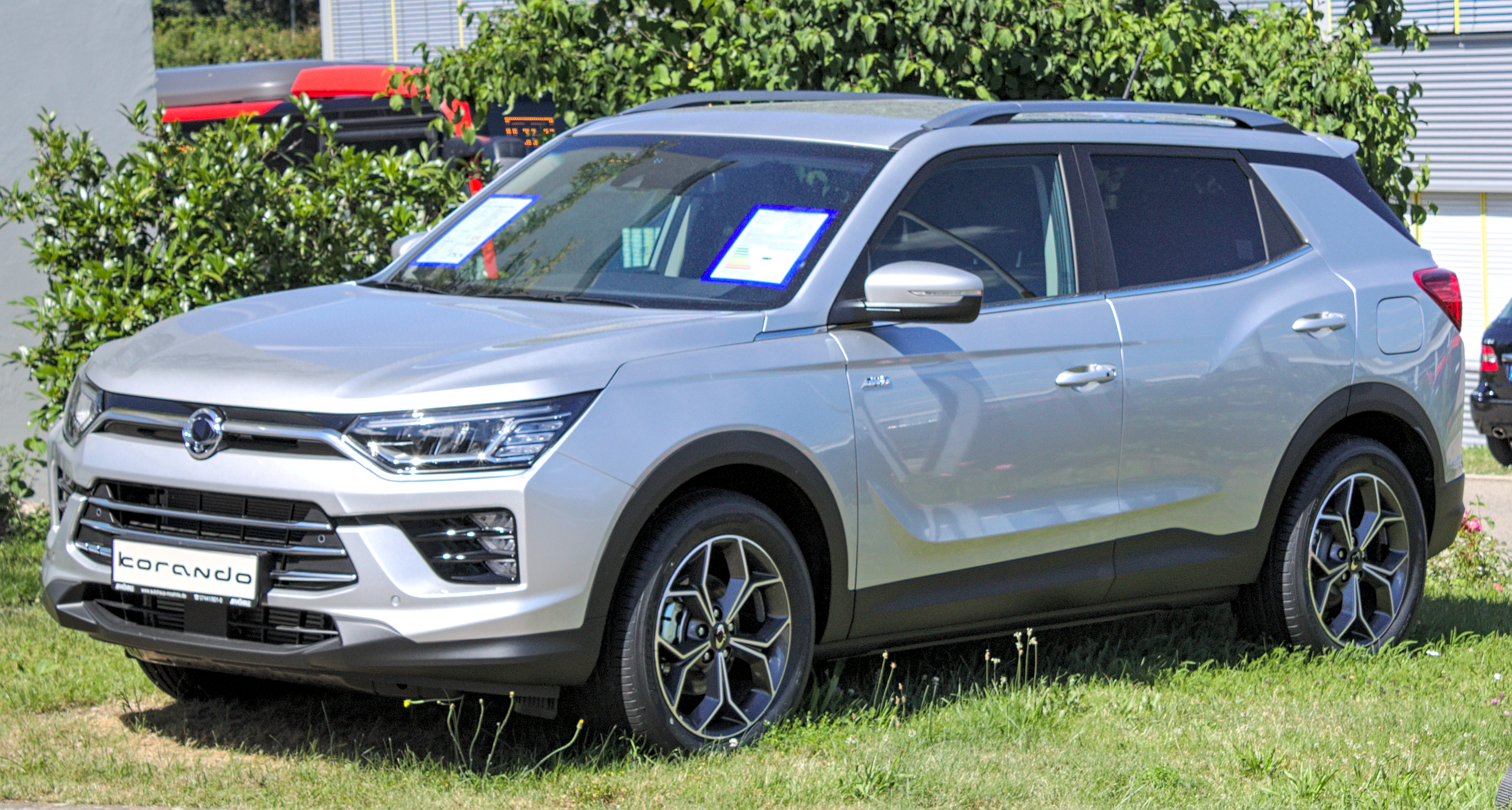

Overview
- Manufacturer: Keohwa (1983–1984); Dong-A Motors (1984–1988); SsangYong Motor (1988–2023); KGM (2023–present)
- Production: 1983–2006; 2010–present

Body and chassis
- Class: Mini SUV (1983–2006); Compact crossover SUV (C) (2010–present)
- Body style: 3-door SUV (1983–2006); 5-door crossover SUV (2010–present)
- Layout: Front engine, rear-wheel drive / front-wheel drive / four-wheel drive

The KGM Korando, formerly SsangYong Korando (Korean: 쌍용 코란도) is a mini SUV or compact crossover SUV built by the South Korean automobile manufacturer SsangYong from 1983 to 2010 and from 2010 onwards. The name Korando is a contraction of "Korea Can Do". The Korando brand is listed in the Guinness Book of Records as Korea's longest surviving name plate.

== First generation (1982) ==
First generation
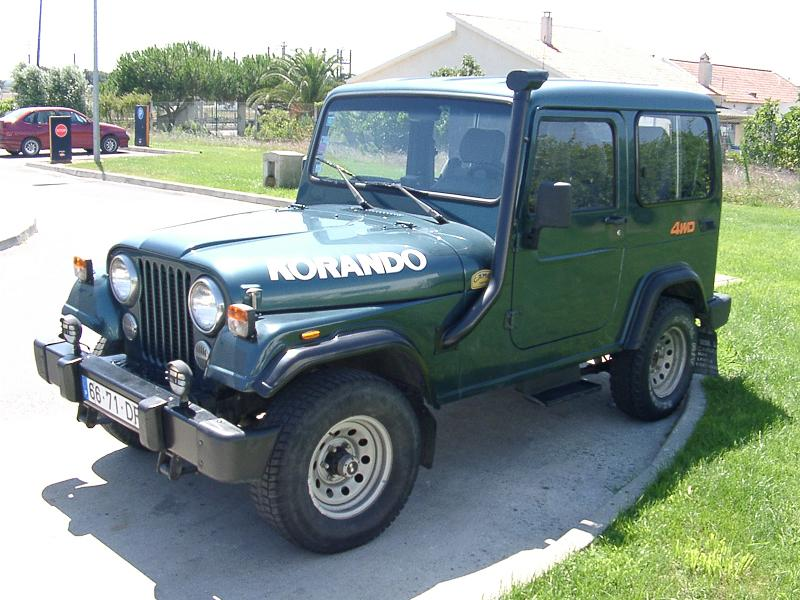

Overview
- Also called: Keohwa Korando (1983-84); Dong-A Korando (1985–87)
- Production: 1983–1984 (Keohwa Co. Ltd.); 1985–1987 (Dong-A Motors); 1988–1996 (SsangYong Motors)
- Assembly: Jurye-dong, Sasang-gu, Busan, South Korea; Mekong Auto, Vietnam (1991-?)

Body and chassis
- Class: Mini SUV
- Body style: 3-door wagon Van; Ambulance; Pickup truck
- Layout: Front engine, four-wheel drive
- Related: Jeep CJ

Powertrain
- Engine: Isuzu 4BA1 (diesel); Isuzu C223 (diesel); Isuzu G200Z (gasoline); Peugeot XD3P (diesel); Korean made Daewoo (Isuzu) DC23 (diesel)

Dimensions
- Wheelbase: 2,390 mm (94.1 in) (SWB); 2,895 mm (114.0 in) (LWB)
- Length: 3,860 mm (152.0 in) (SWB) (short); 4,680 mm (184.3 in) (LWB)
- Width: 1,700 mm (66.9 in)
- Height: 1,850–1,900 mm (72.8–74.8 in)
- Curb weight: 1,660–2,295 kg (3,660–5,060 lb)

In 1964, Ha Dong-hwan Motor Company began to assemble Jeeps, trucks, and buses for the US armed forces and for the United Nations Command.

In November 1969, the CJ-5 entered production with the 75 hp (56 kW) Willys Hurricane inline-four engine and in 1971, a ten-seater version and a pickup model were introduced. In April 1974, American Motors and Shinjin Motors formed a joint venture, Shinjin Jeep Motors, to build local Jeeps. These originally had a locally built AMC 258 ci straight-six engine with 110 hp (82 kW) SAE, but after the oil crises of the seventies Isuzu's 2.8-liter 4BA1 diesel engine with 85 hp (63 kW) SAE was introduced in July 1979.

Troubled AMC withdrew from South Korea in August 1978. Shinjin Motors sold a shipment of Jeeps to Libya in 1979, in spite of the embargo, and this led to another ownership shakeup as it invalidated the license. Keohwa Co Ltd took over production in March 1981, and rotated the bars in the grille to minimize the resemblance to a Jeep. It remained available on two wheelbases of 2,390 or 2,895 mm (94.1 or 114.0 in), with the AMC inline-six or the Isuzu 2.8-liter diesel. In November 1982, the nine-seater "Family Deluxe" was introduced, and the range was renamed "Korando" in March 1983.

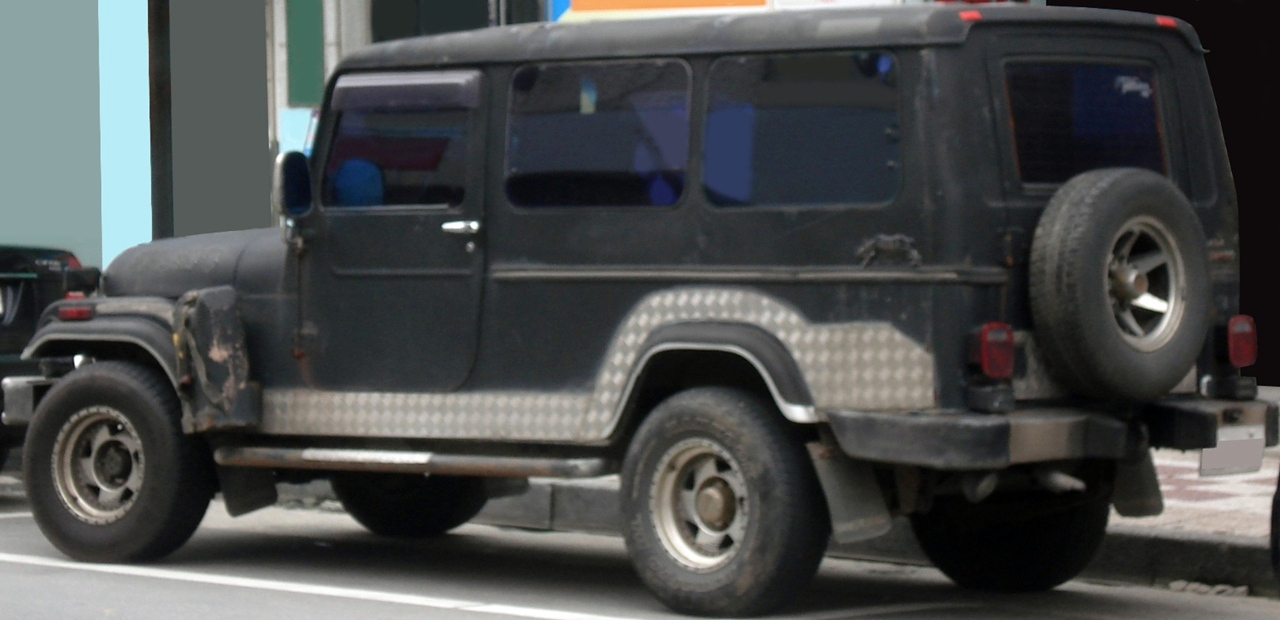
A Korando K9 with extended wheelbase.

Keohwa was absorbed by Dong-A Motor in December 1984, and a facelift followed in March 1985. The new model had a changed interior and the large diesel was replaced by the 2238 cc Isuzu C223 engine. The pickup version was discontinued. In June, Isuzu's 2-liter G200Z petrol engine was added. In 1986, Korandos were exported to Japan; and in 1988, SsangYong began exporting them to Europe. In November 1986 Dong-A was integrated into the SsangYong Group, who changed the company's name to SsangYong Motor Company in March 1988.

Unlike the CJ-7, a 9-seat extended version was also available, called the Korando K9. In late 1988 a new SUV on the chassis of the Isuzu Trooper was introduced, called the SsangYong Korando Family, but this car has no relation to the Jeep CJ-7 beyond the "Korando" nameplate. Production of the Jeep-based Korando ended in 1996.

== Second generation (1996–2010) ==
Second generation
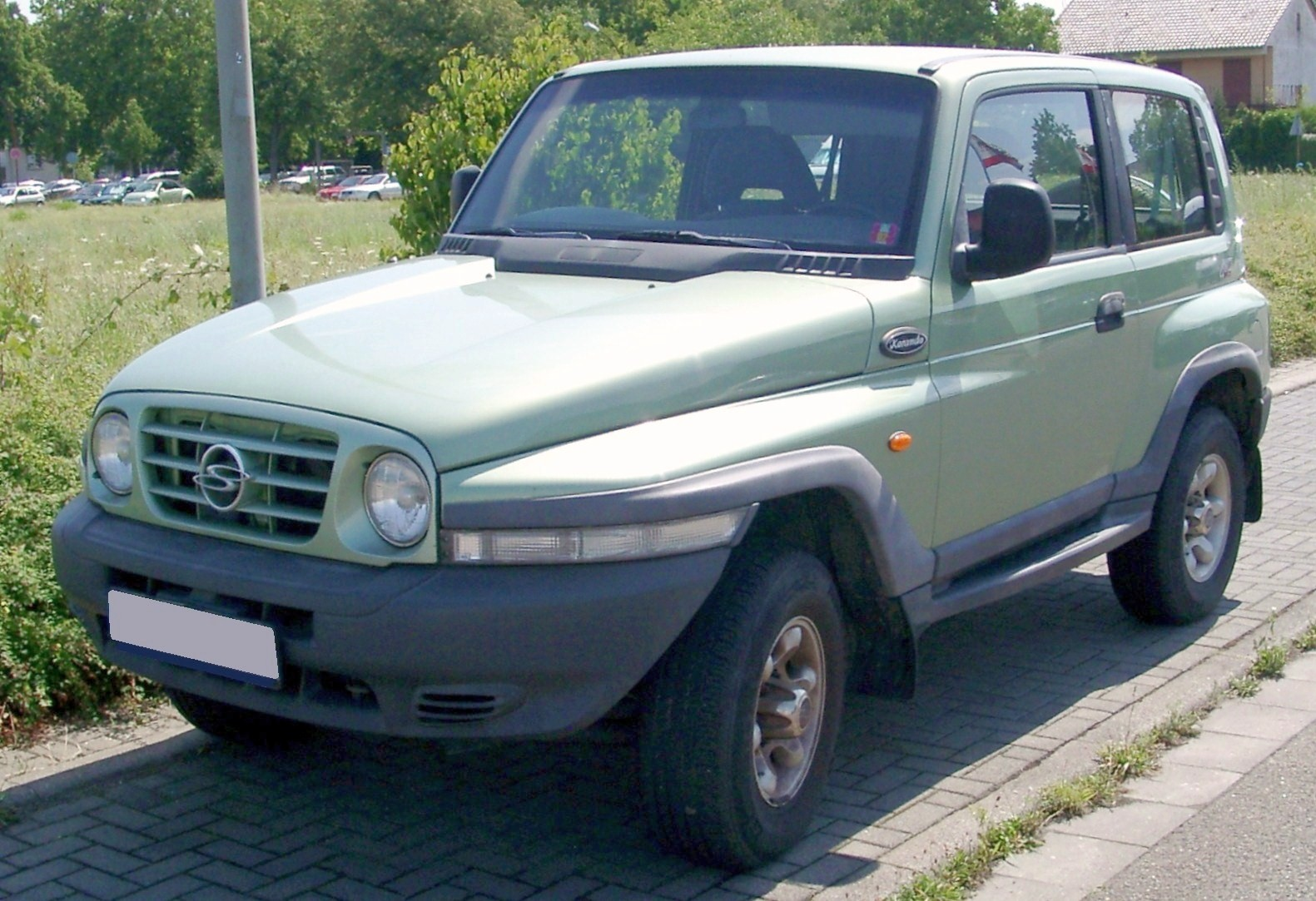

Overview
- Also called: Daewoo Korando; SsangYong Actyon Korando (South Korea, 1997–1999); TagAZ Tager (Russia)
- Production: 1996–2006 (SsangYong); 1997–2005 (Mekong Auto); 2008–2014 (TagAZ)
- Assembly: Pyeongtaek, South Korea; Ho Chi Minh City, Vietnam; Taganrog, Russia (TagAZ); Lublin, Poland; Saveh, Iran (Bon Ro)
- Designer: Ken Greenly

Body and chassis
- Class: Mini SUV
- Body style: 3-door wagon
- Layout: Front engine, rear-wheel drive / four-wheel drive

Powertrain
- Engine: 2.3 L M111 I4 (petrol); 3.2 L M104 I6 (petrol); 2.3 L OM601 I4 (diesel); 2.9 L OM602 I5 (diesel)

Dimensions
- Wheelbase: 2,480 mm (97.6 in)
- Length: 4,330 mm (170.5 in)
- Width: 1,840 mm (72.4 in)
- Height: 1,845 mm (72.6 in)
- Curb weight: 1,800 kg (3,968 lb)

The second generation "New" Korando was released in Asia in 1996 to complement the SsangYong Musso (released in 1993), released in Europe in 1997 and in Australia in 1998 and was based on a shortened version of the Musso's chassis. The 1.8 tonne 3-door mini SUV was designed by Professor Ken Greenley.

It features a choice of 2.3- and 3.2-liter gasoline engines, or 2.3- and 2.9-liter diesel engines, all produced on license from Mercedes-Benz, accompanied by a five-speed manual Borg-Warner gearbox. The interior of the second generation Korando was unique because it had a steering wheel arch on either side. This was to make converting to right-hand-drive easier and to cut down on production costs. On the passenger's side, a handle was fitted in the arch.

This generation was sold as the Daewoo Korando from 1999 to 2001, as Daewoo bought a majority stake in SsangYong, but was later forced to sell its shares.

=== Revision ===
Production of the second generation ended in 2010. Sales however in many markets continued through to 2007 due to remaining stock. It was available with a variety of petrol and diesel engines, including a 2.9-liter five-cylinder diesel from Mercedes-Benz. In 2008, Russian TagAZ, under license, began to assemble the Korando as the TagAZ Tager, not only three-door guise, but also in a specific five-door long-wheelbase version.

=== Gallery ===
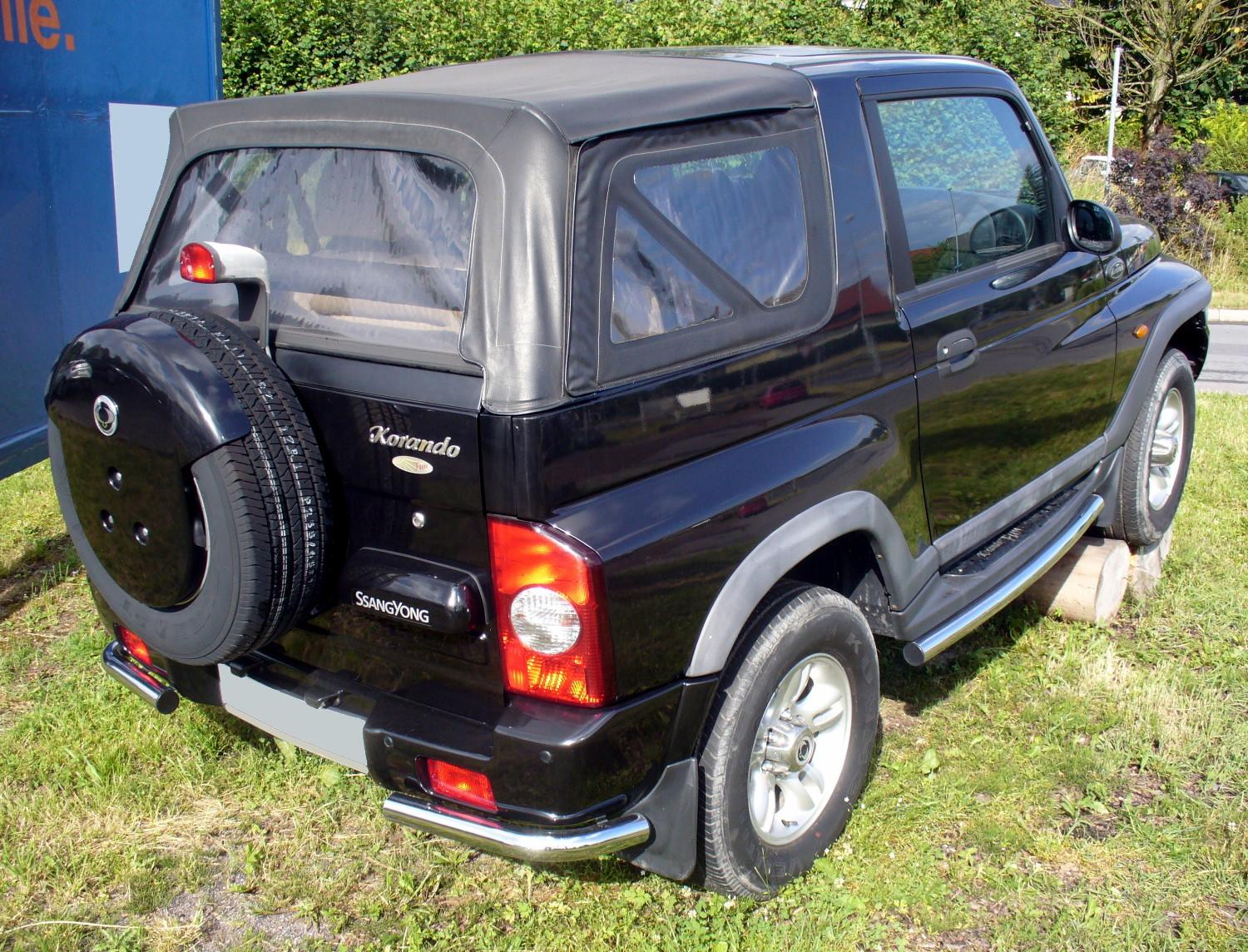
Korando cabrio

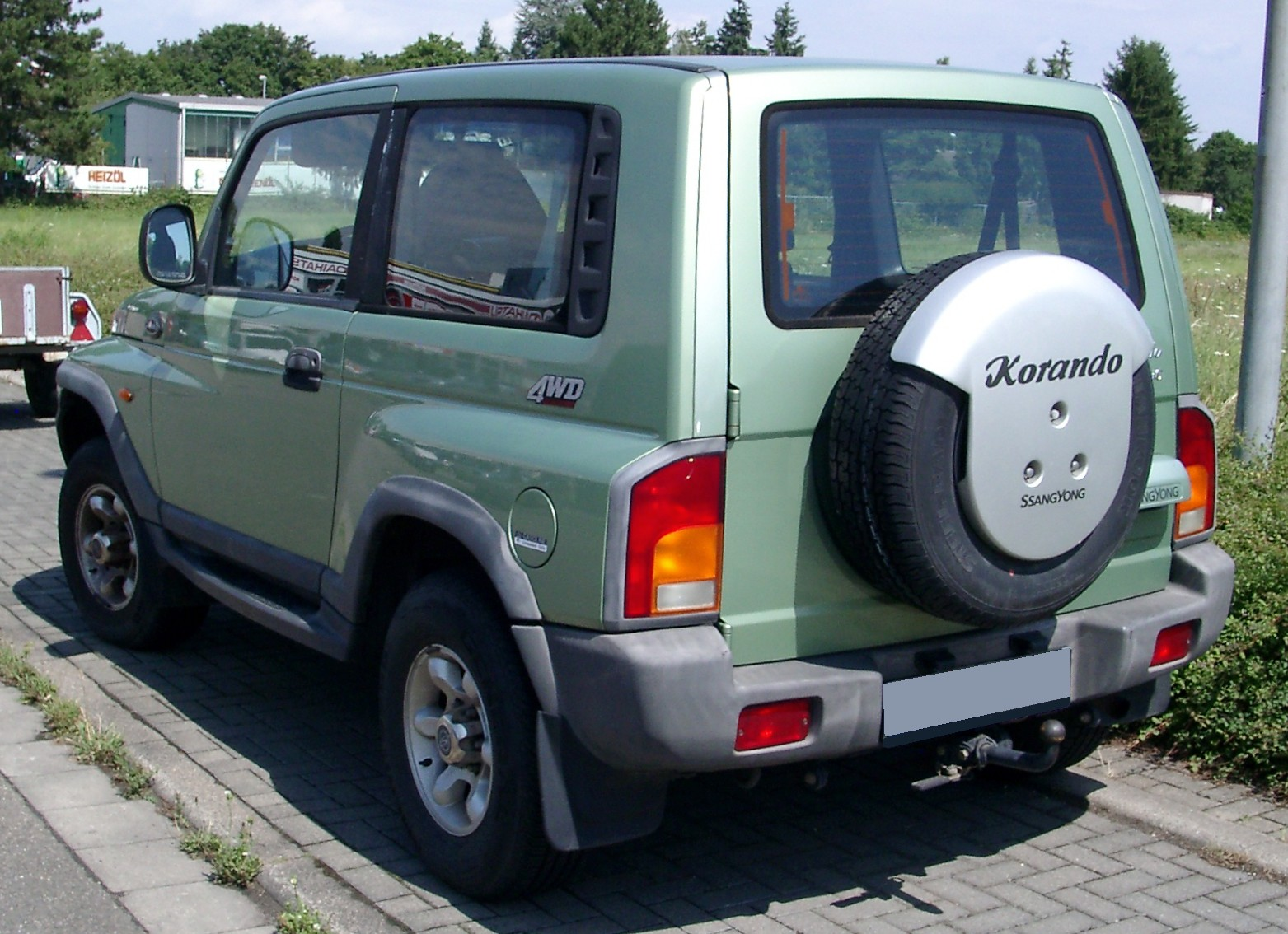
Rear view of the hardtop model

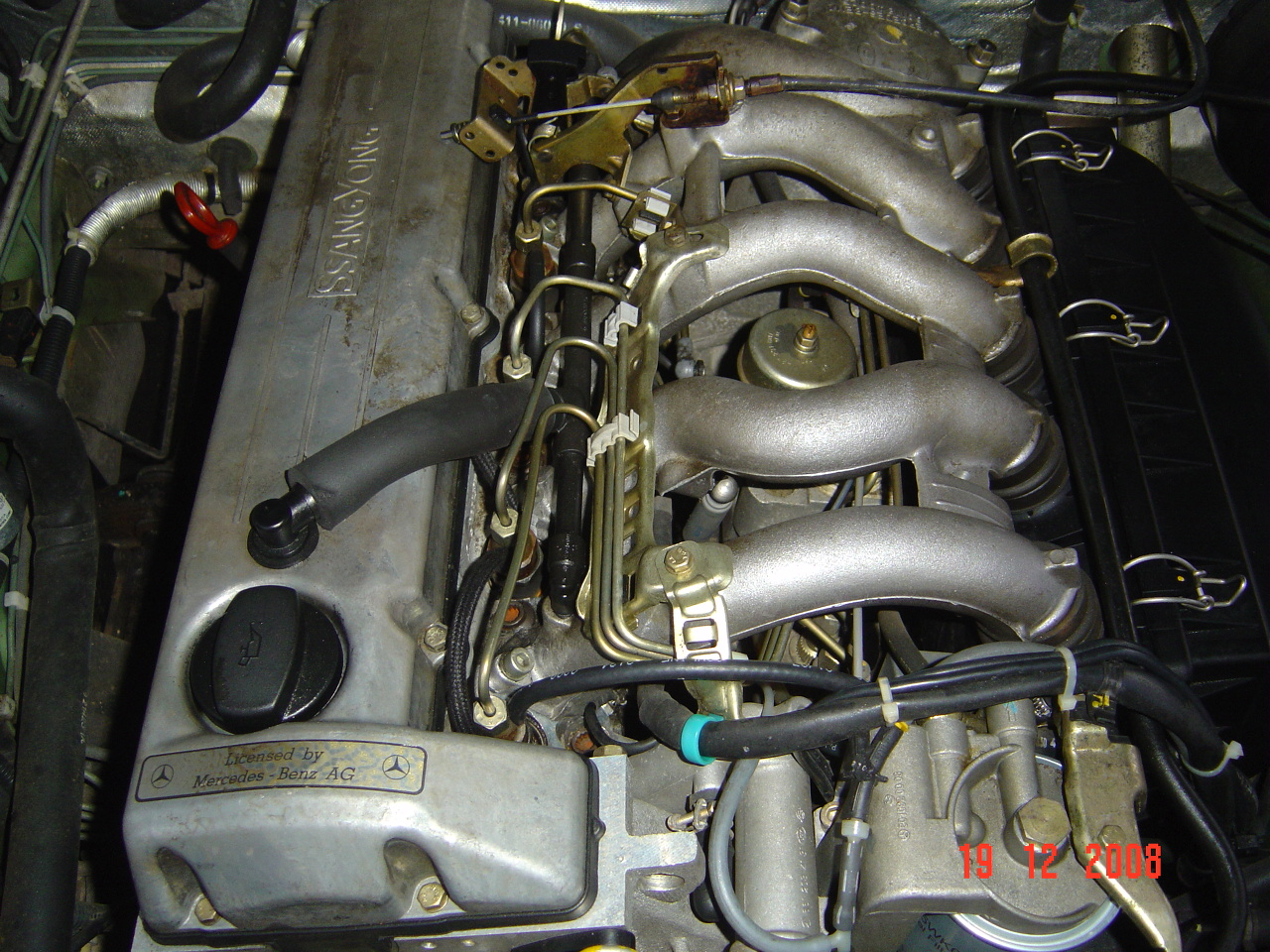
The 2.9-liter Mercedes-Benz engine used in the Korando

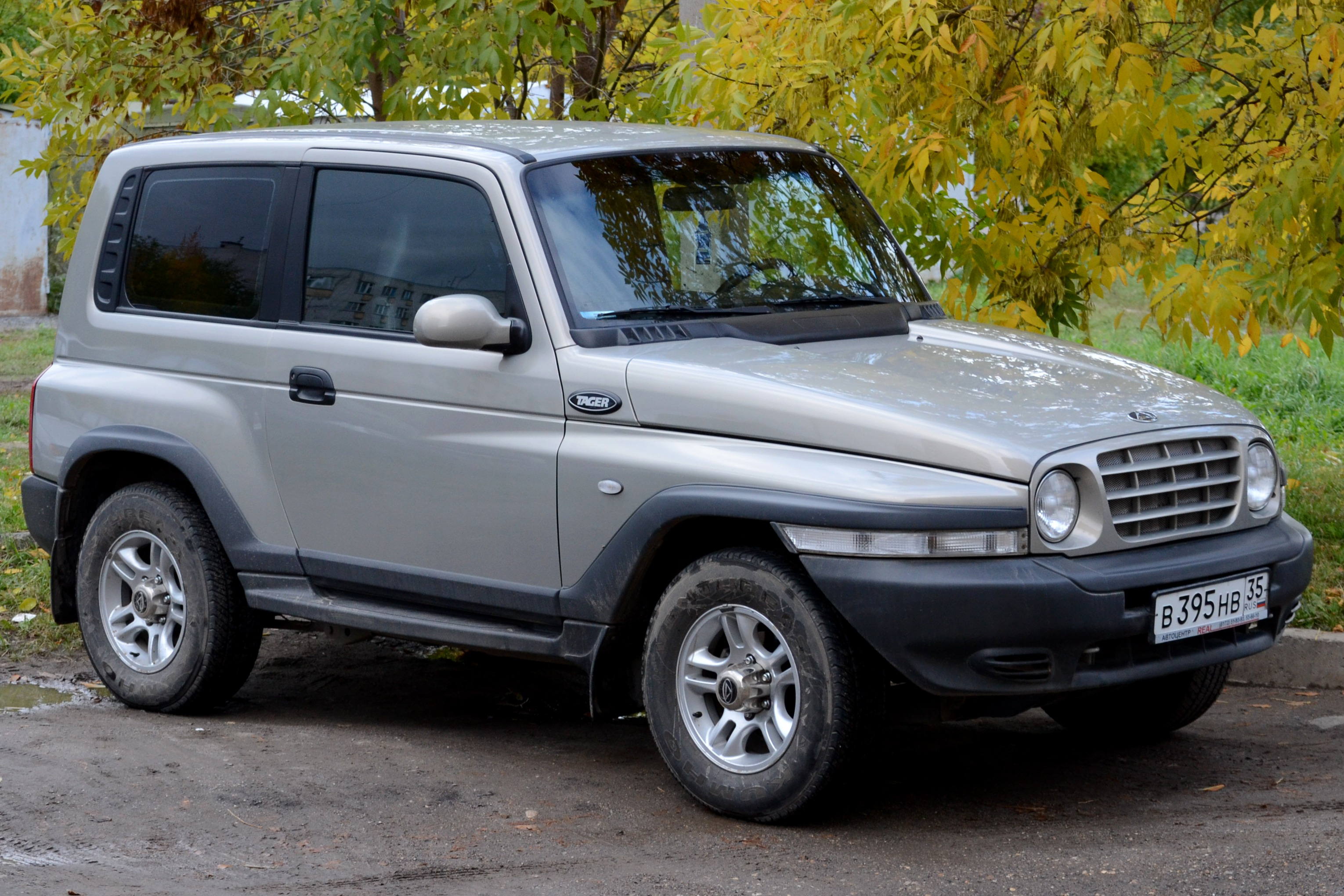
TagAZ Tager 3-door

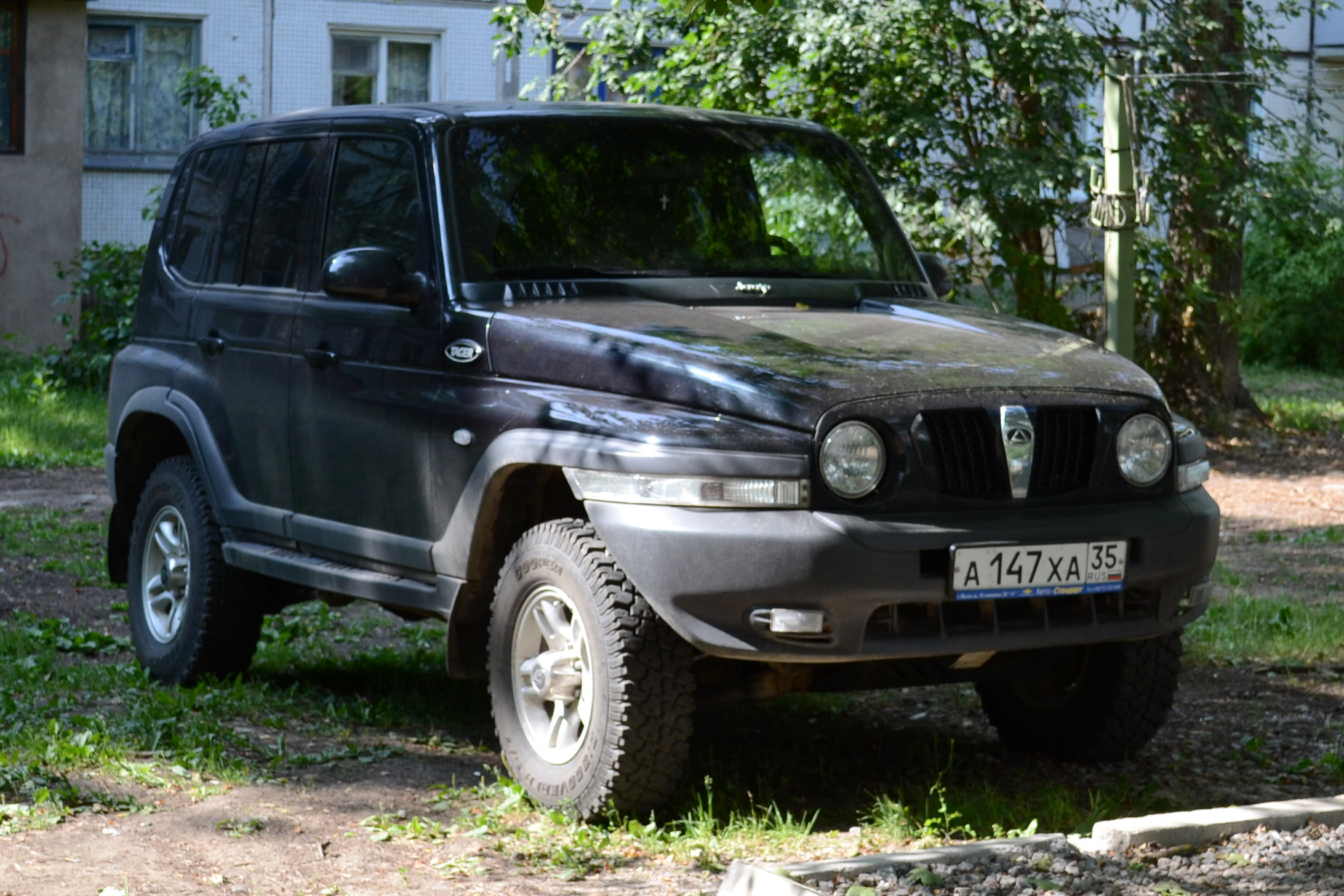
TagAZ Tager 5-door

== Third generation (C200; 2010) ==
Third generation (C200)
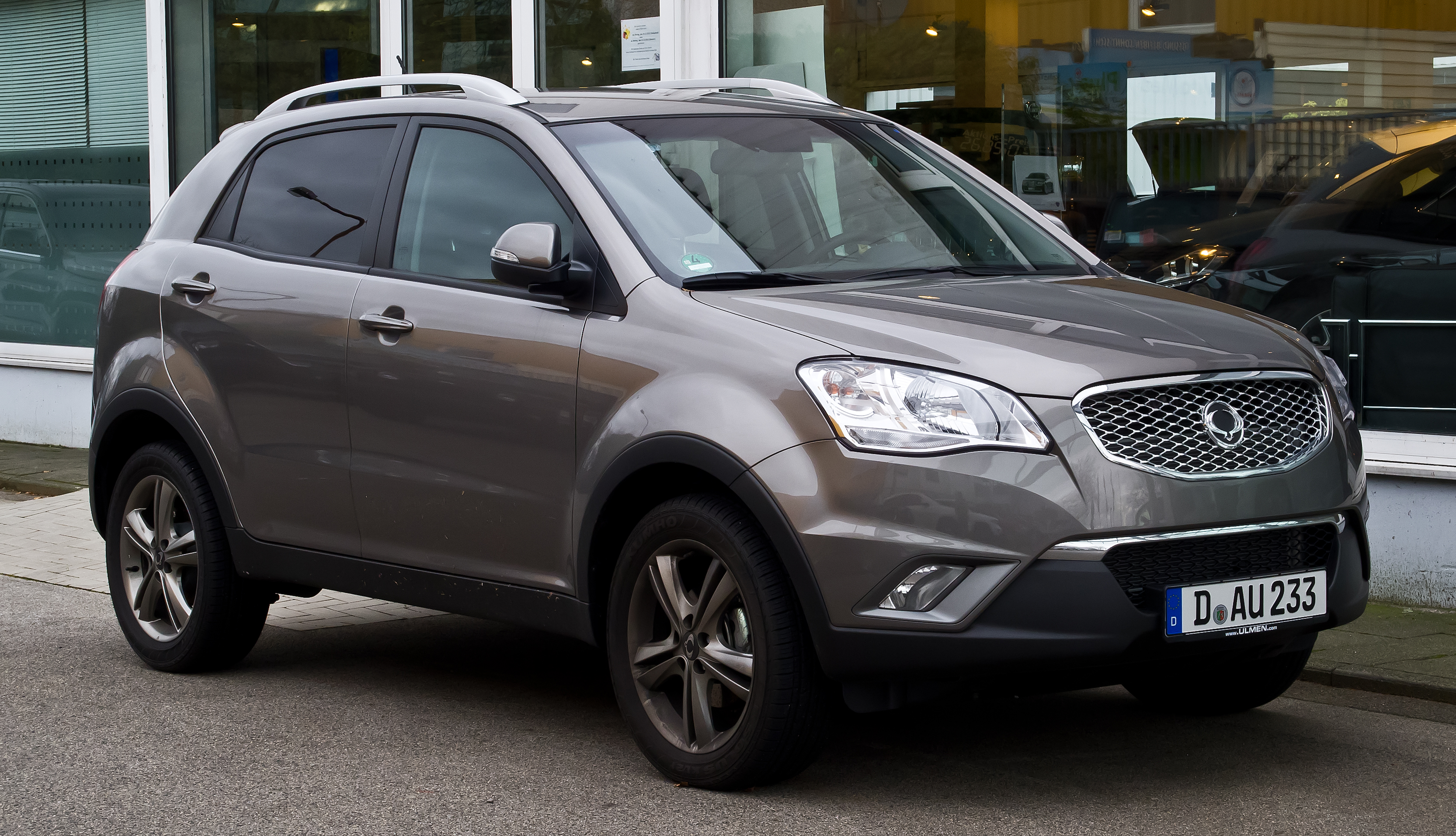

Overview
- Also called: SsangYong Korando C (South Korea); SsangYong New Actyon (Kazakhstan & Russia); SsangYong Actyon (Malaysia); SsangYong Korando.
- Production: 2010–2019
- Assembly: Pyeongtaek, South Korea; Vladivostok, Russia (Sollers); Kremenchuk, Ukraine (KrASZ) Brazil: Espírito Santo (Fabral)
- Designer: Italdesign Giugiaro

Body and chassis
- Body style: 5-door SUV
- Layout: Front-engine, front-wheel-drive Front-engine, four-wheel-drive

Powertrain
- Engine: 2.0 L I4 (petrol); 2.0 L I4 (diesel); 2.2 L I4 (diesel)
- Transmission: 6-speed manual 6-speed automatic

Dimensions
- Wheelbase: 2,650 mm (104.3 in)
- Length: 4,410 mm (173.6 in)
- Width: 1,830 mm (72.0 in)
- Height: 1,675 mm (65.9 in)
- Curb weight: 1,537–1,692 kg (3,389–3,730 lb)

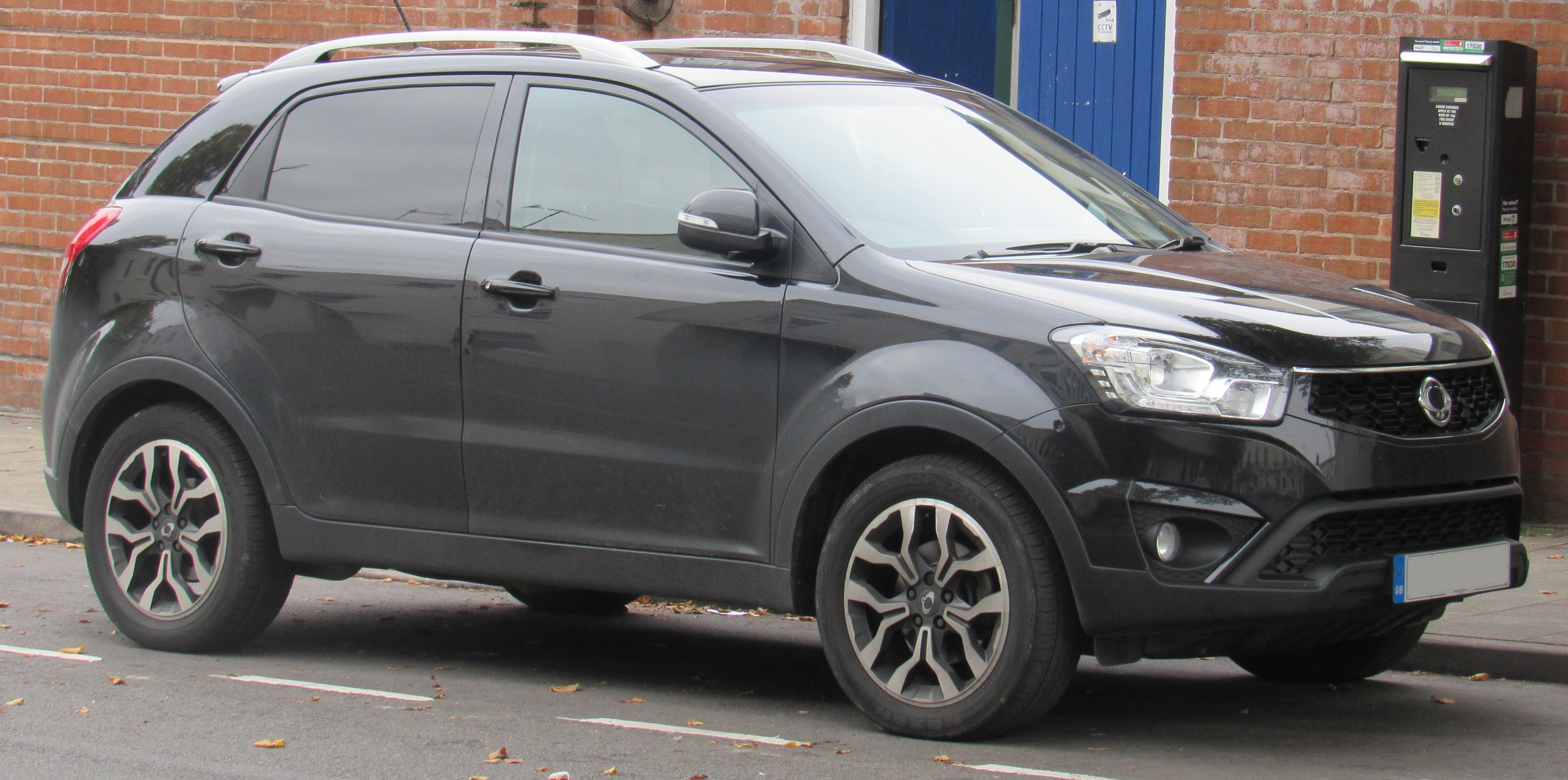
SsangYong Korando 1st facelift

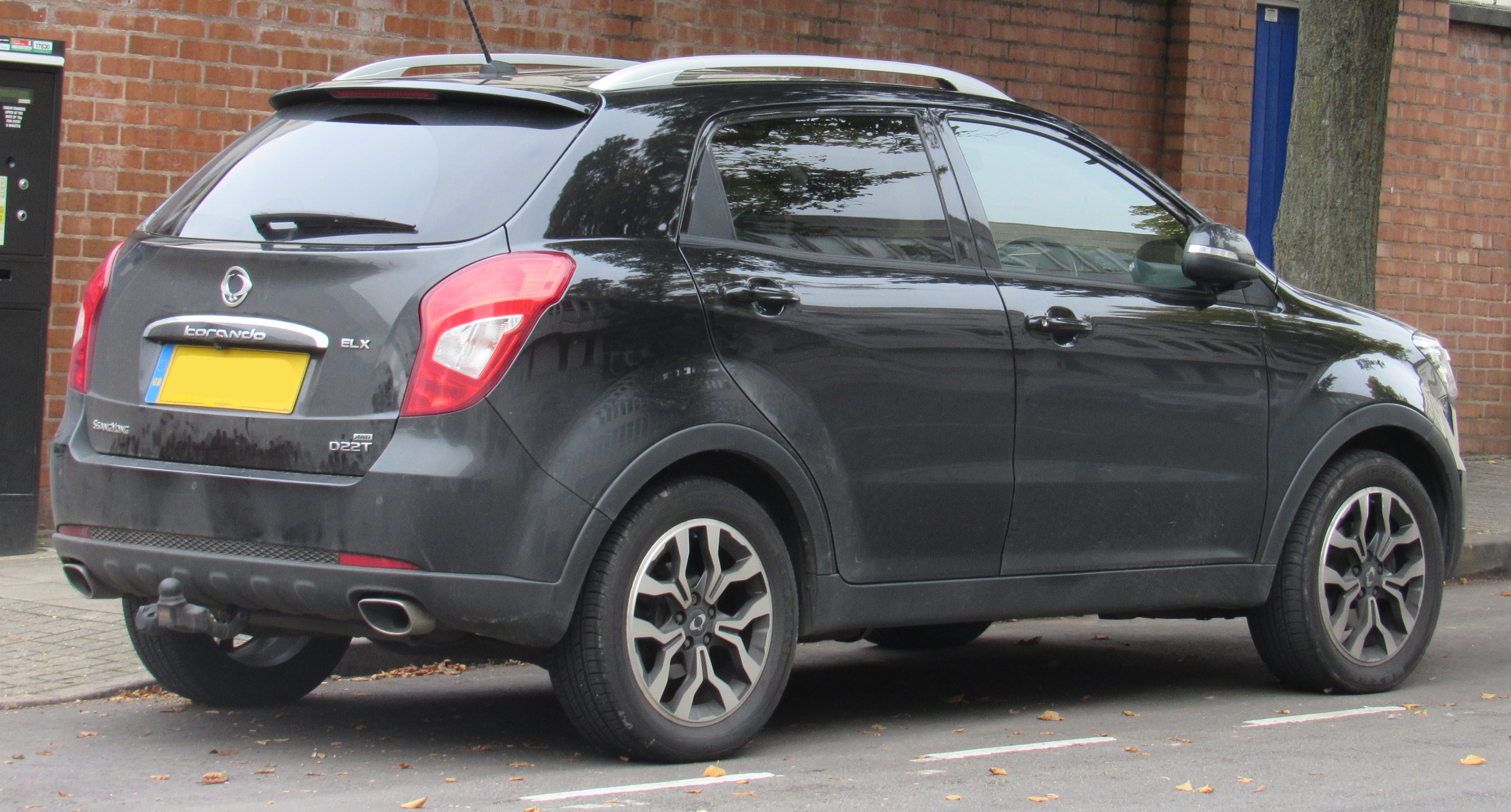
SsangYong Korando rear

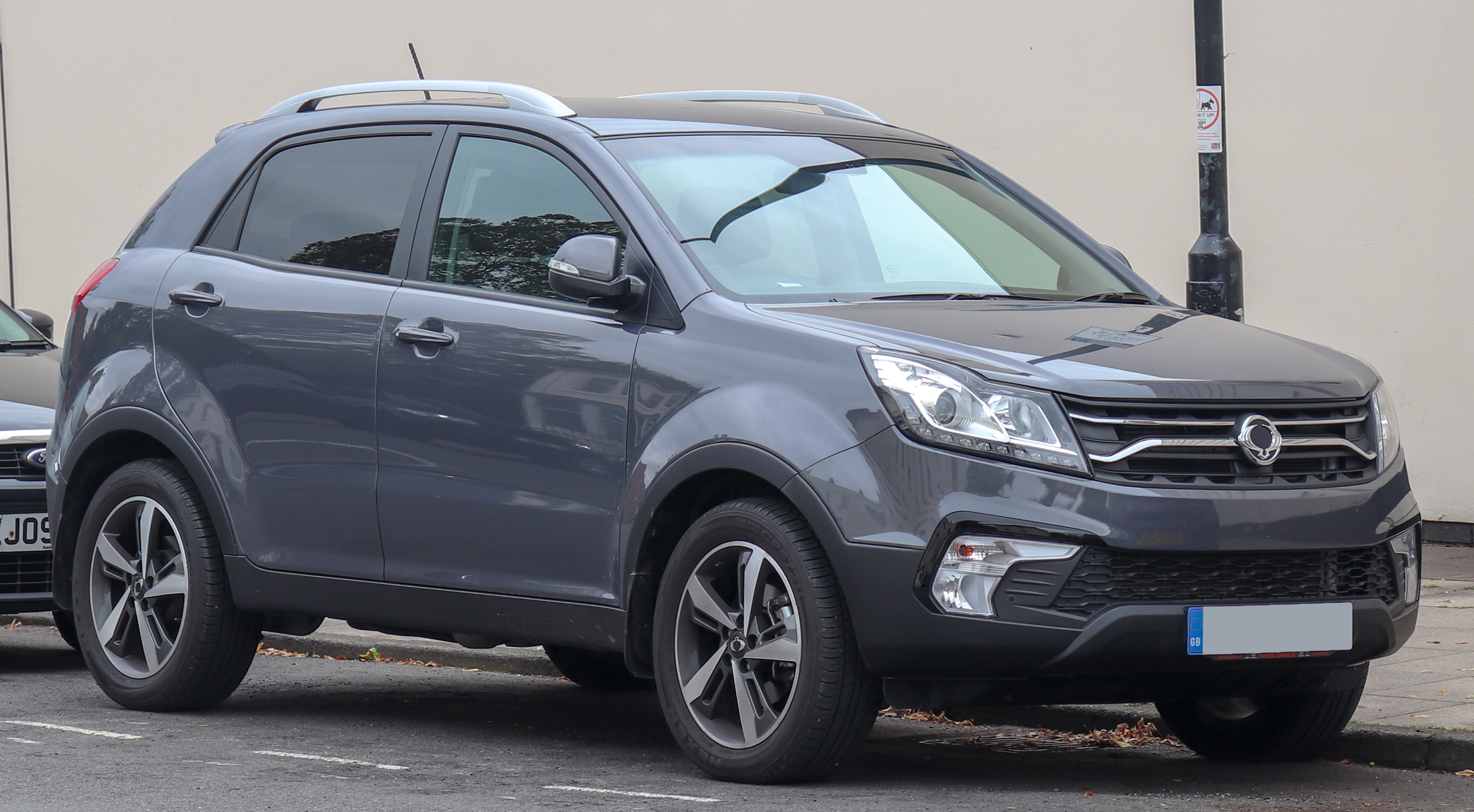
SsangYong Korando 2nd facelift

The third generation Korando, codenamed the SsangYong C200 began production in late 2010. It is to be the first car to be released as part of SsangYong's revised lineup. It has slightly longer wheelbase than its rivals, the Hyundai ix35 and Kia Sportage. The decision to name the C200 the Korando was done so by SsangYong. The car will be sold in Russia as the SsangYong New Actyon.

In 2013, SsangYong introduced facelift version of Korando. They re-designed front grille with new headlights include LED daytime running lamp, and rear combination lamp. In 2016, SsangYong replaced Korando's 2.0 liter diesel engine to 2.2 liter diesel engine with Euro 6 compliance. In 2017, 2nd facelift version revealed.

=== Features ===
The third generation Korando was initially released with a 6-speed manual transmission and a 6-speed M11 automatic transmission and is in production from May 2011 to 2015. Since 2015, SsangYong replaced Korando's automatic gearbox to Aisin 6-speed transmission. It is also to be offered as a front-wheel-drive or four-wheel-drive from launch. Its combined fuel consumption is 5.5 L/100 km and acceleration from 0–100 km/h takes less than 10 seconds. The engine available upon release was a 2.0 liter turbodiesel producing 175 horsepower. Petrol engine was introduced in 2012.

The Korando comes with 6 airbags as standard. The trunk capacity is 480 liters; however this can be expanded to 1300 liters when the seats are folded down.

=== Reception ===
The new Korando was well received from a design perspective with many reviewers noting design improvements over previous models. Interior space too, was praised, as was the all-new monocoque chassis.
It became SUV of the year in Macedonia for 2012.

=== Concept models ===
Since 2008, five concept cars (some named C200) have been unveiled:

==== C200 ====
The original concept, the C200, debuted at the 2008 Paris Motor Show and has since been shown at many others. The concept received mostly positive feedback and was thought by many to be the vehicle that can turn SsangYong's reputation for having cars with questionable styling around.

==== C200 Aero ====
The concept car C200 Aero made its debut at the 2009 Seoul Motor Show. It was released one year later as Korando C with almost no modification of the original Giugiaro design.

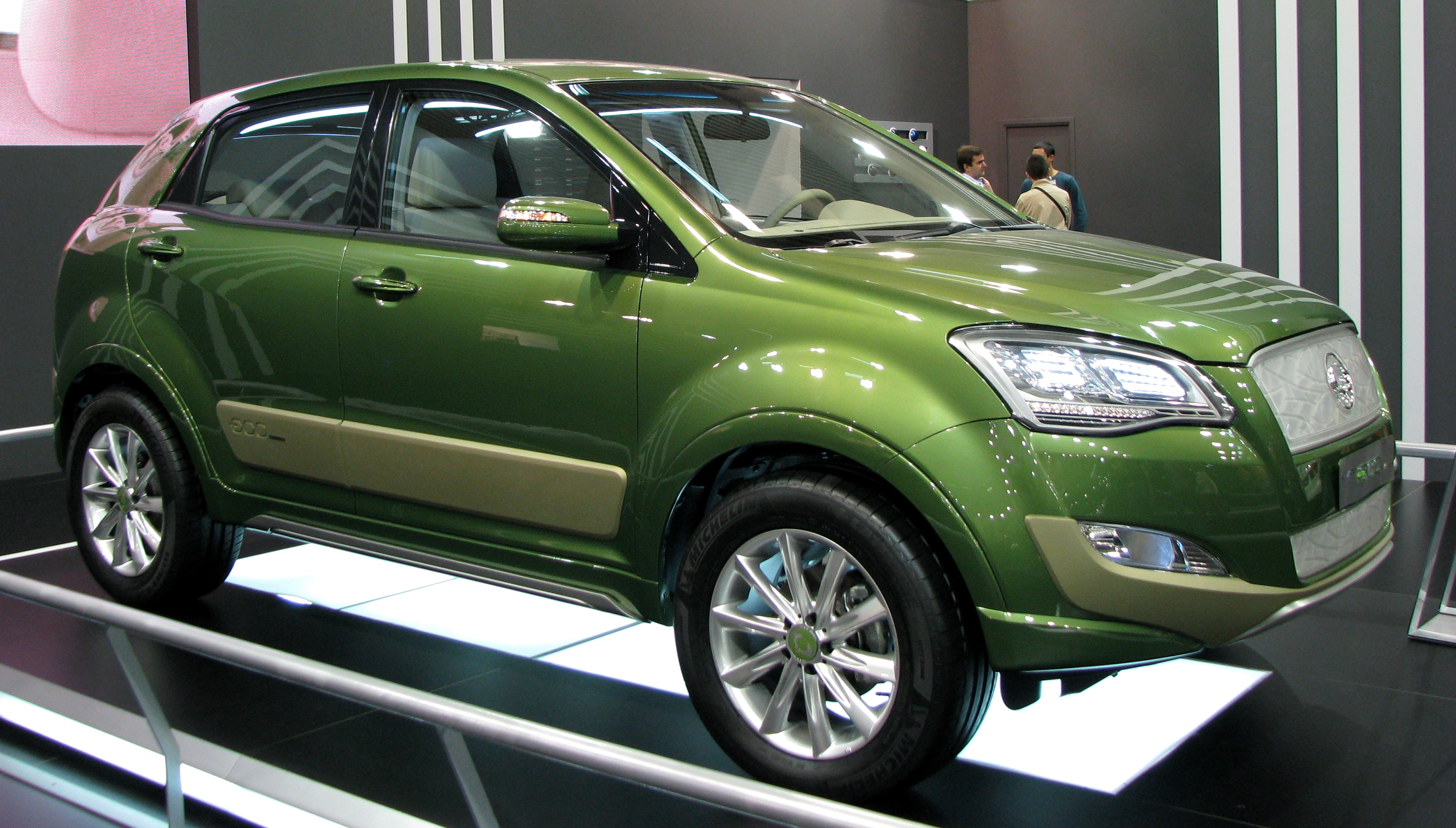
SsangYong C200 Eco at the 2009 Salón Internacional del Automóvil in Barcelona

==== C200 Eco ====
The C200 Eco made its debut at the 2009 Seoul Motor Show. It is a hybrid which uses both a diesel engine and an electric one (powered by a 340 volt battery). It also uses a stop-start system which shuts off the engine during stops. Fuel saving will be around 25%. The interior features a green trim and an airy cabin.

==== Korando C ====
Launched at the 2010 Busan International Motor Show, the new Korando C concept has stayed mostly the same as the previous concepts but has more aggressive styling and is said to be a representation of the production version. Performance-wise, the new concept has a 2.0-liter turbo-diesel engine and a confirmed power output of 135 kW (184 PS; 181 hp) and 360 N⋅m (270 lb⋅ft) of torque. The interior is similar to that of the C200 Eco. It was also displayed as an Actyon at the 2010 Moscow International Automobile Salon, wearing SsangYong's global logo instead of their domestic logo.

==== Korando EV ====
Launched at the 2010 Busan International Motor Show, the Korando EV was a fully electric concept car based on the Korando C. It has a top speed of 150 km/h, and a range of 180 km.

==== Korando C Art Car ====
Launched at the 2010 Busan International Motor Show alongside the Korando C and Korando EV concepts was an Atomouse-themed art car, in collaboration with Korean pop artist Dongi Lee and the Gana Art Centre. It was also displayed as an Actyon at the 2010 Moscow International Automobile Salon, wearing SsangYong's global logo instead of their domestic logo.

== Fourth generation (C300; 2019) ==
Fourth generation (C300)
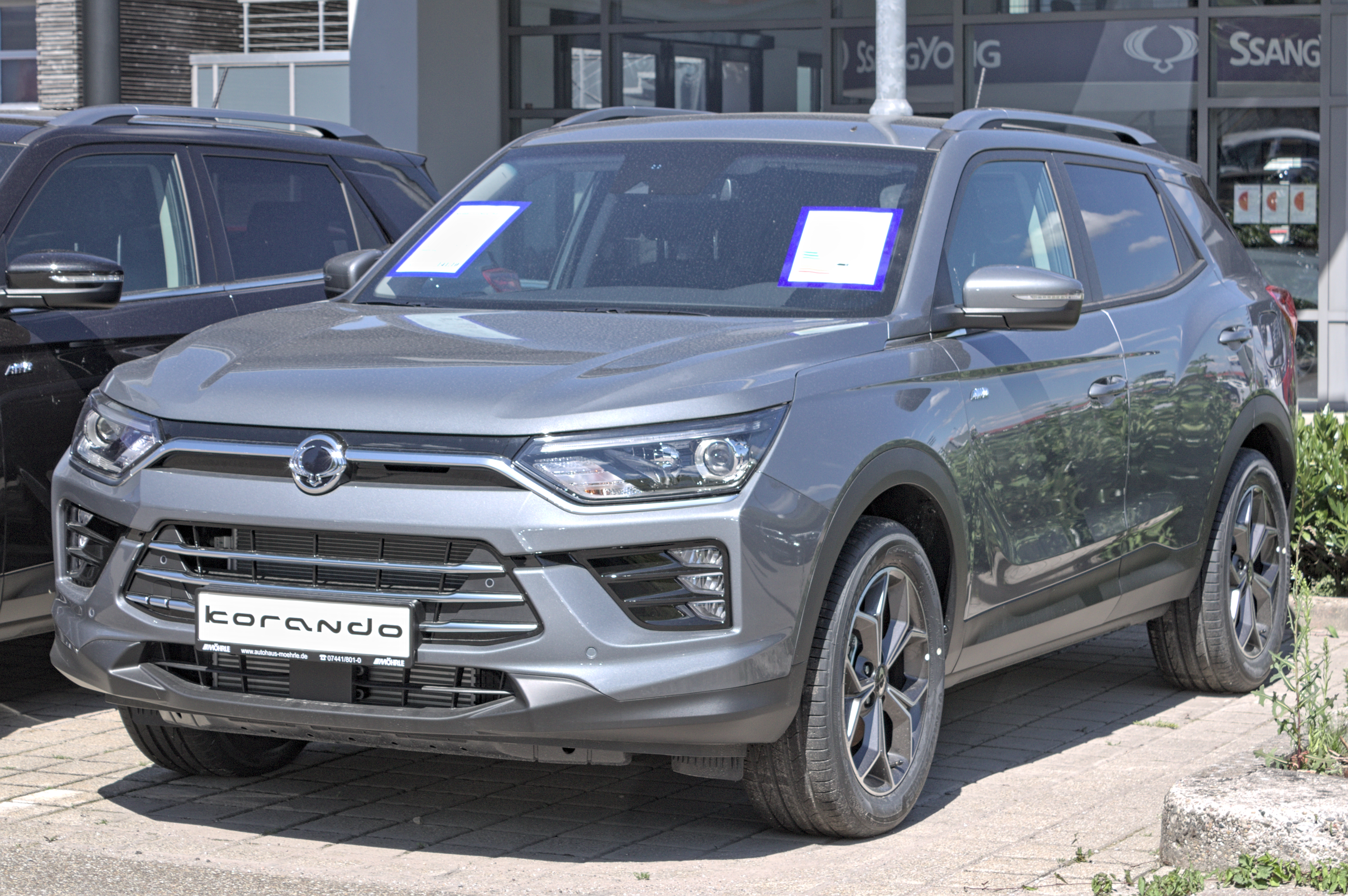

Overview
- Manufacturer: SsangYong Motor (2019–2023); KG Mobility (2023–present)
- Production: 2019–present
- Assembly: South Korea: Pyeongtaek, Gyeonggi Province; Iran: Saveh (Noora Motor Pars)

Body and chassis
- Body style: 5-door crossover SUV
- Layout: Front-engine, front-wheel-drive Front-engine, four-wheel-drive
- Related: KGM Torres

Powertrain
- Engine: 1.5 L e-XGi 150T GDI-T I4 (petrol); 1.6 L e-XDi 160 I4-T (diesel)
- Transmission: 6-speed manual 6-speed Aisin automatic

Dimensions
- Wheelbase: 2,675 mm (105.3 in)
- Length: 4,450 mm (175.2 in)
- Width: 1,870 mm (73.6 in)
- Height: 1,675 mm (65.9 in)
- Curb weight: 1,535 kg (3,384.1 lb); 1,640 kg (3,615.6 lb) (AWD)

On January 28, 2019, SsangYong released a teaser image and video of the new Korando. The Korando was launched in South Korea on February 26, and debuted to the global market in Geneva Motor Show 2019.

The Korando is offered with a choice of 163 horsepower 1.5-liter turbo petrol or 136 horsepower 1.6-liter diesel engine and is available in two or four-wheel drive. And it is equipped with 6-speed manual transmission or 6-speed AISIN automatic gearbox.

=== Korando E-Motion ===
The Korando E-motion is a fully electric version of the Korando and the first fully electric SsangYong. It was made available from the 2022 model year. The vehicle features a 61.5 kWh battery allowing for 339 km of WLTP range, which powers a 140 kW (190 hp), 360 Nm front-wheel driving electric motor.

=== Safety ===
Euro NCAP test results for a SsangYong Korando 1.6 diesel, LHD, 5-door SUV variant with standard safety equipment on a 2019 registration:

Euro NCAP test results* SsangYong Korando w/ standard equipment (2019)
Test	Points	%
Overall:	5 /5 stars	
Adult occupant:	33.8	88%
Child occupant:	41.8	85%
Pedestrian:	33.1	68%
Safety assist:	9.7	74%

ANCAP test results* SSangYyong Korando (2019, aligned with Euro NCAP)
Test	Points	%
Overall:	5 /5 stars	
Adult occupant:	33.7	88%
Child occupant:	42.6	86%
Pedestrian:	33	68%
Safety assist:	9.4	72%

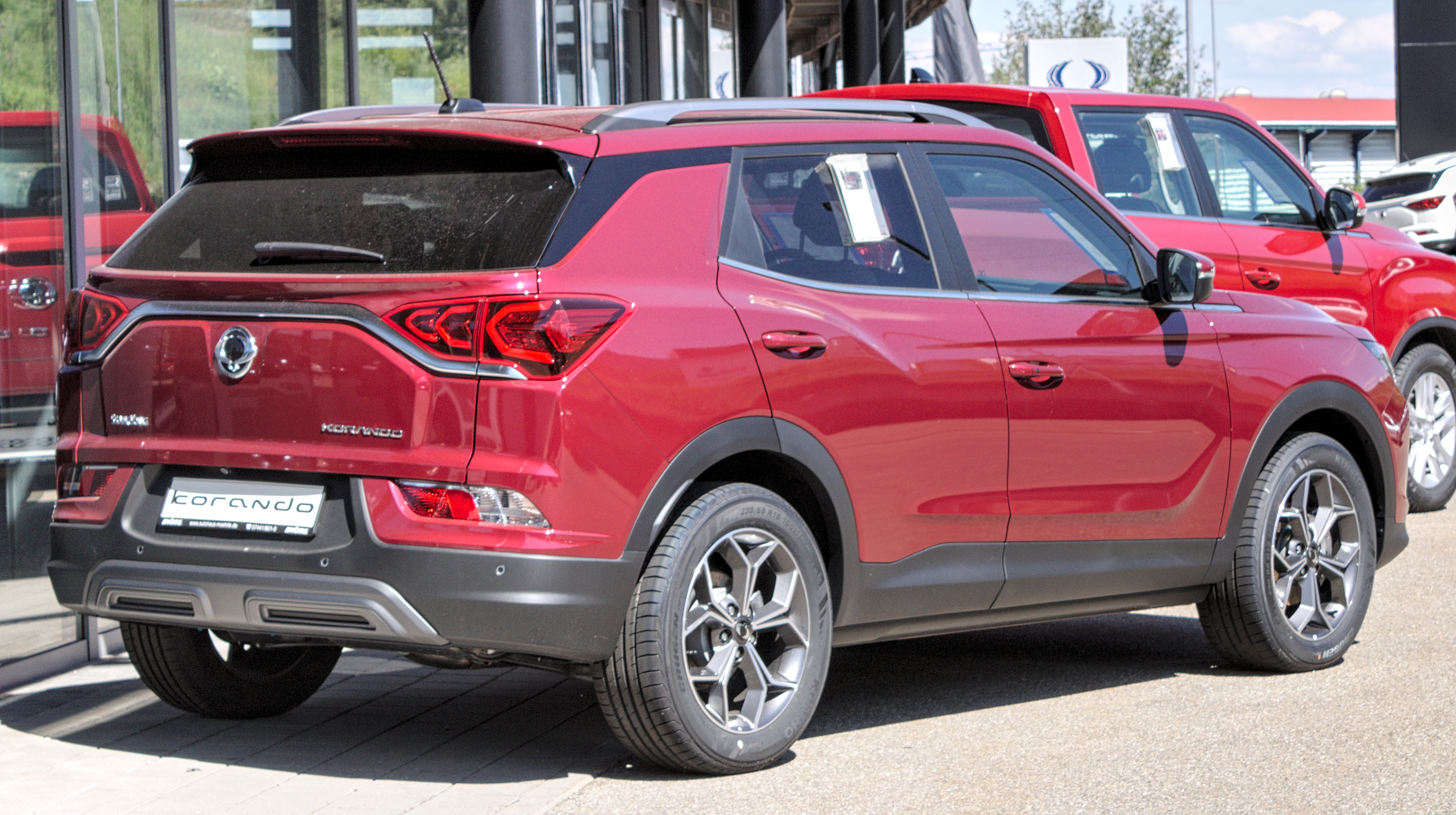
SsangYong Korando C300

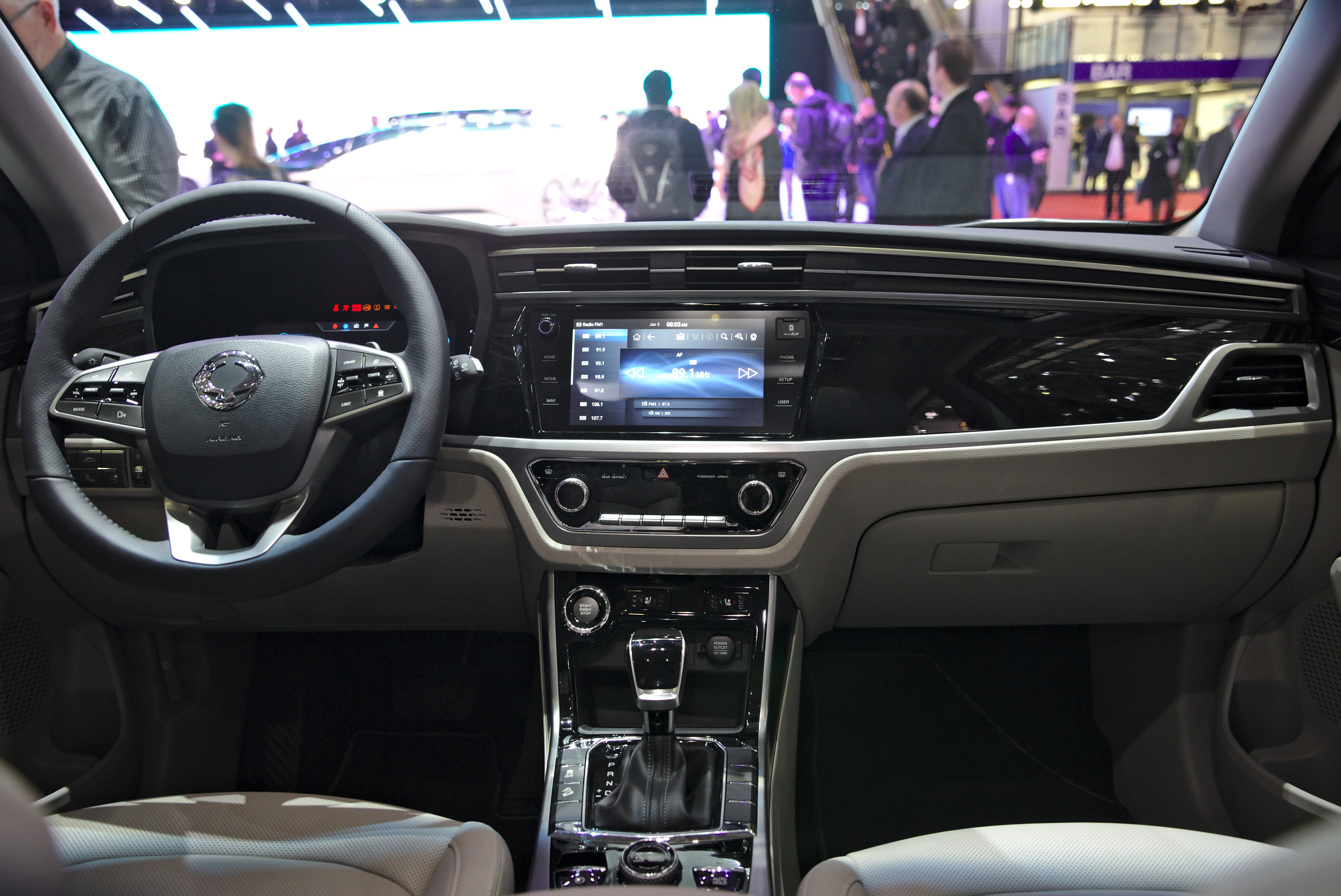
Interior

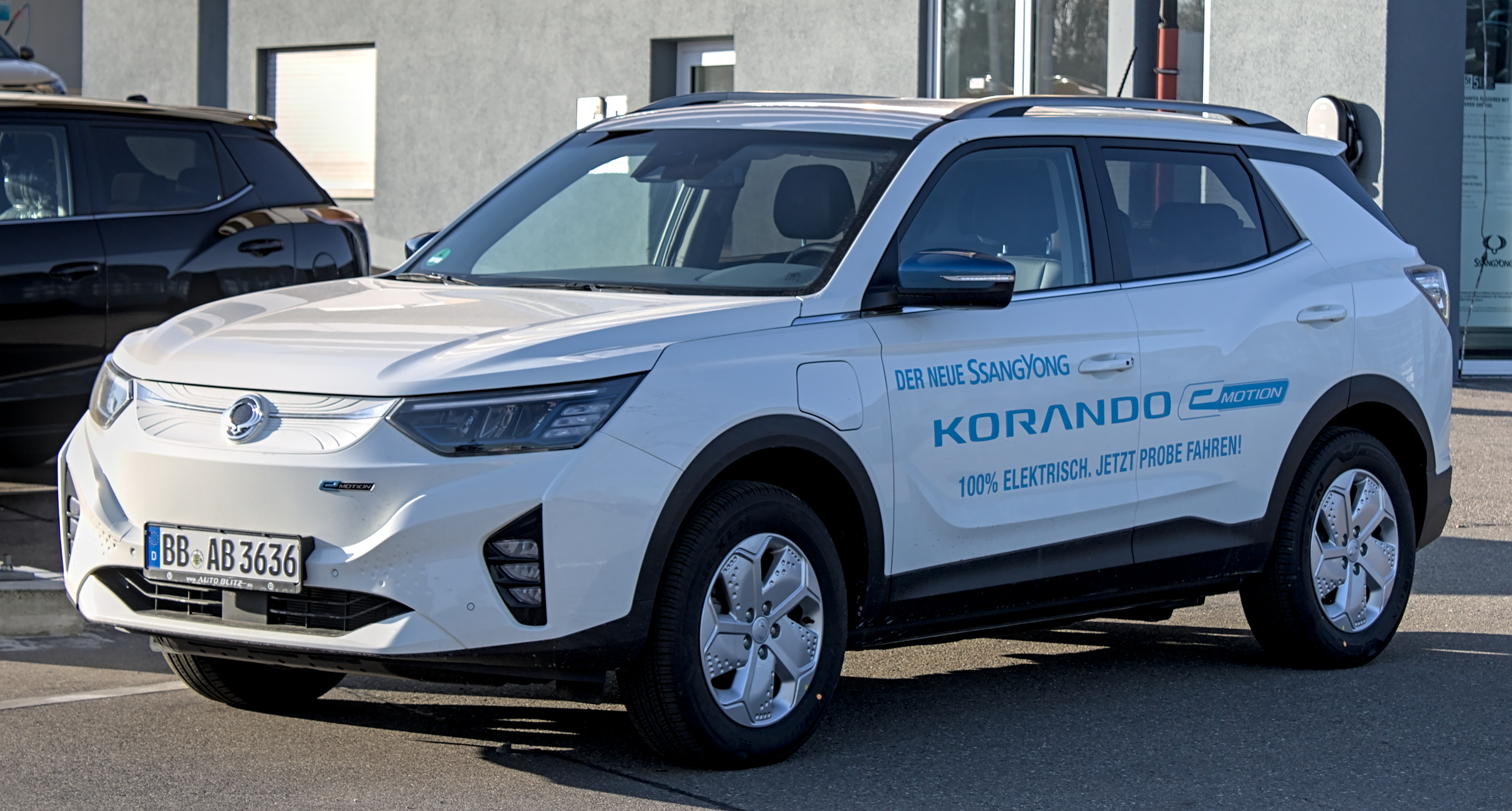
Ssangyong Korando E-Motion

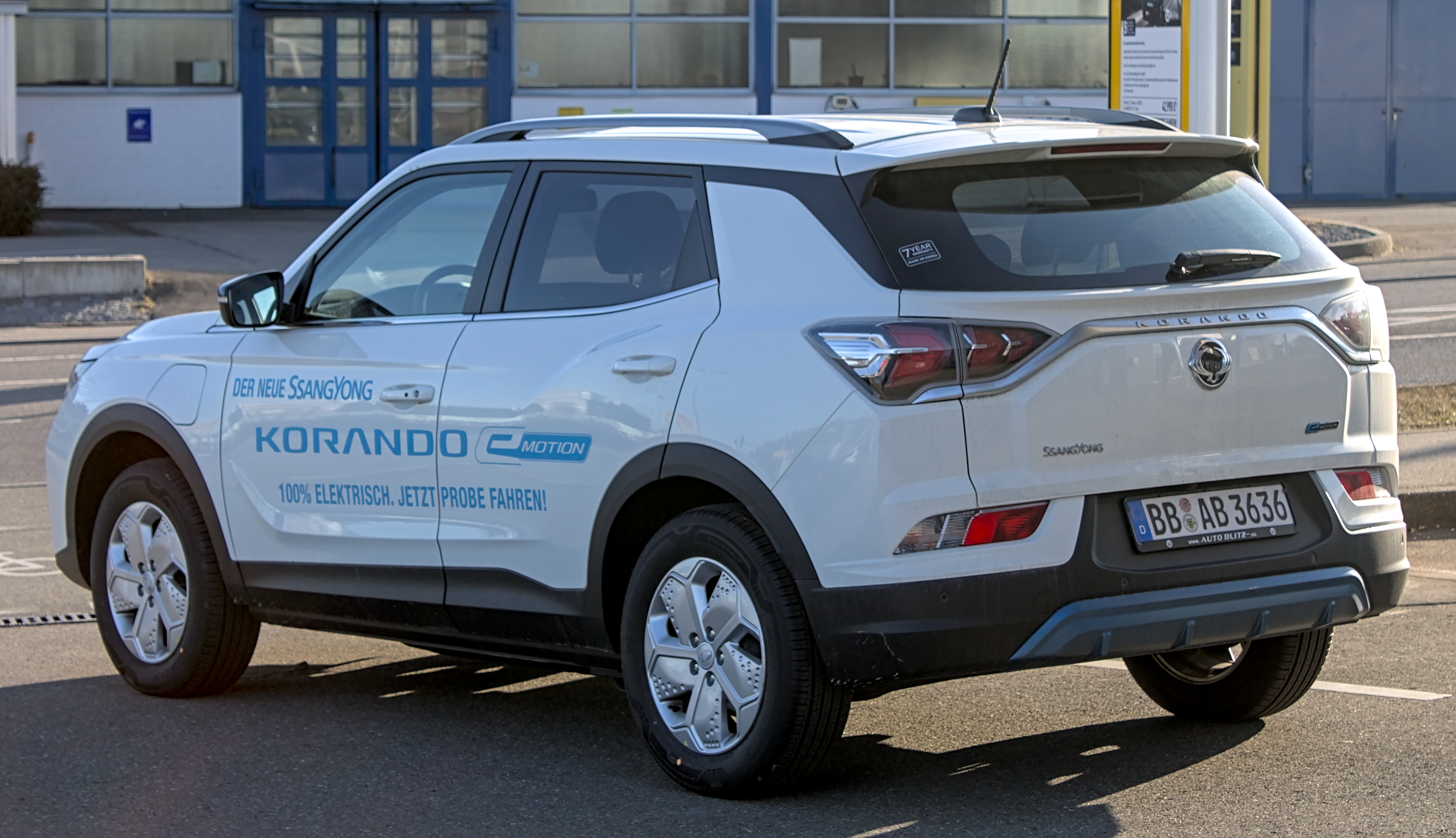
Rear view
