= E4U (vehicle) =

Hyundai E4U
- Type: Electric vehicle
- Wheels: Three
- Inventor: Hyundai's Advanced Design Department
- Introduced: 2013 Seoul Motor Show
- Design time: 4 Mos.

Hyundai E4U

Overview
- Manufacturer: Hyundai
- Production: 4 Mos.

Body and chassis
- Class: Electric vehicle
- Layout: Three wheels

The E4U is a single-person road vehicle, produced by Hyundai.

== Operation ==
It travels on a rotating front sphere and two rear training-wheel-type supports. Propulsion is controlled by foot pedals, which cause the spherical front to tilt. It comes with headgear that serves as the roof.
