= Alpha Motor Corporation =

American electric vehicle company

- Type: Private company
- Industry: Automotive
- Founded: 2020; 6 years ago
- Headquarters: Irvine, California, United States
- Area served: United States
- Key people: Edward Lee (founder, executive chairman)
- Products: Electric vehicles
- Website: alphamotorinc.com

Alpha Motor Corporation (commonly known as Alpha) is an American electric vehicle company based in Irvine, California. As of 2024, the company has revealed a number of concepts in several colour schemes, but has not begun production of any vehicles.

== History ==
Alpha Motor Corporation was founded in 2020 by Edward Lee. Prior to founding Alpha, Lee has worked at Toyota, Audi, Hyundai, and the short-lived EV startup company Neuron Corporation.

Alpha teased its first vehicle, the Icon electric commercial vehicle, on December 2, 2020. The Icon was never officially unveiled, however. Later that month on December 23, Alpha revealed its first passenger car, the Alpha Ace coupe featuring retro styling, as a 3D model. The Ace is estimated by Alpha Motor Corporation to have a range of over 250 mi (400 km) and a 0–60 mph (0–97 km/h) time of 6.0 seconds. Alpha Motor Company stated that it would unveil more vehicles in the coming months.

In February 2021, Alpha revealed the Ace-based Jax, a crossover quad coupe, as a 3D model, with "Jax" being an acronym of "Junior All-terrain Crossover". It is essentially an Ace with two extra half-doors in the rear for easier rear access, a higher suspension, and off-roading accessories. Alpha also revealed the Ace Performance, a sport variant of the standard Ace model.

In March 2021, Alpha revealed its third car, the Wolf 2-door pickup truck, based on the company's previously-revealed cars. The company later revealed two variants of the Wolf; the Wolf+, an extended cab version, in April, and the SuperWolf, a double cab version, in July. The Alpha Wolf pickups and the company's other vehicles only existed as 3D models, until Alpha Motor Corporation presented its first physical example of a car, the Wolf pickup, at the Petersen Automotive Museum, Los Angeles in August.

In November 2021, Alpha Motor Corporation introduced the Adventure Series, a special edition package for the Ace and Jax, in partnership with KC HiLiTES and KMC Wheels.

On October 31, 2021, Los Angeles Auto Show, announced the Alpha Ace Coupe and Jax as finalists for its inaugural zero-emission vehicle awards program - THE ZEVAS. On November 18, 2021, Los Angeles Auto Show, announced the Alpha Ace Coupe as "Top Coupe" and the winner in the electric coupe category for its inaugural zero-emission vehicle awards program.

On November 19, 2021, at the Los Angeles Auto Show, Alpha revealed its second physical vehicle example, the Saga, which is a sedan based on the Ace.

On March 22, 2022, the parent company of Rolling Stone Korea, e.L.e Media, and South Korean carmaker CNP Motors announced that they had signed a pact with Alpha on March 12, 2022. On April 12, 2022, Alpha and Hinduja Tech announced a partnership for the development and production of electric vehicles, post production support, joint research, and development of other mobility projects. On May 22, 2022, Alpha and Ultimate Hydroforming, Inc (UHI) entered a Memorandum of Understanding (MoU) as UHI will manufacture and validate Alpha's production-ready electric vehicles.

== Vehicles ==
As of 2025, Alpha Motor Corporation has not yet begun the production of any vehicles. The company has revealed the following vehicle prototypes:

- Ace, a subcompact coupe
- Jax, a subcompact crossover
- Montage, a limited-production coupe
- Rex, a compact off-road SUV
- Saga, a compact sedan
- Wolf, a 2-door compact pickup truck
  - Wolf+, an extended cab variant of the Wolf
  - SuperWolf, a double cab variant of the Wolf
