= Chevrolet Miray =

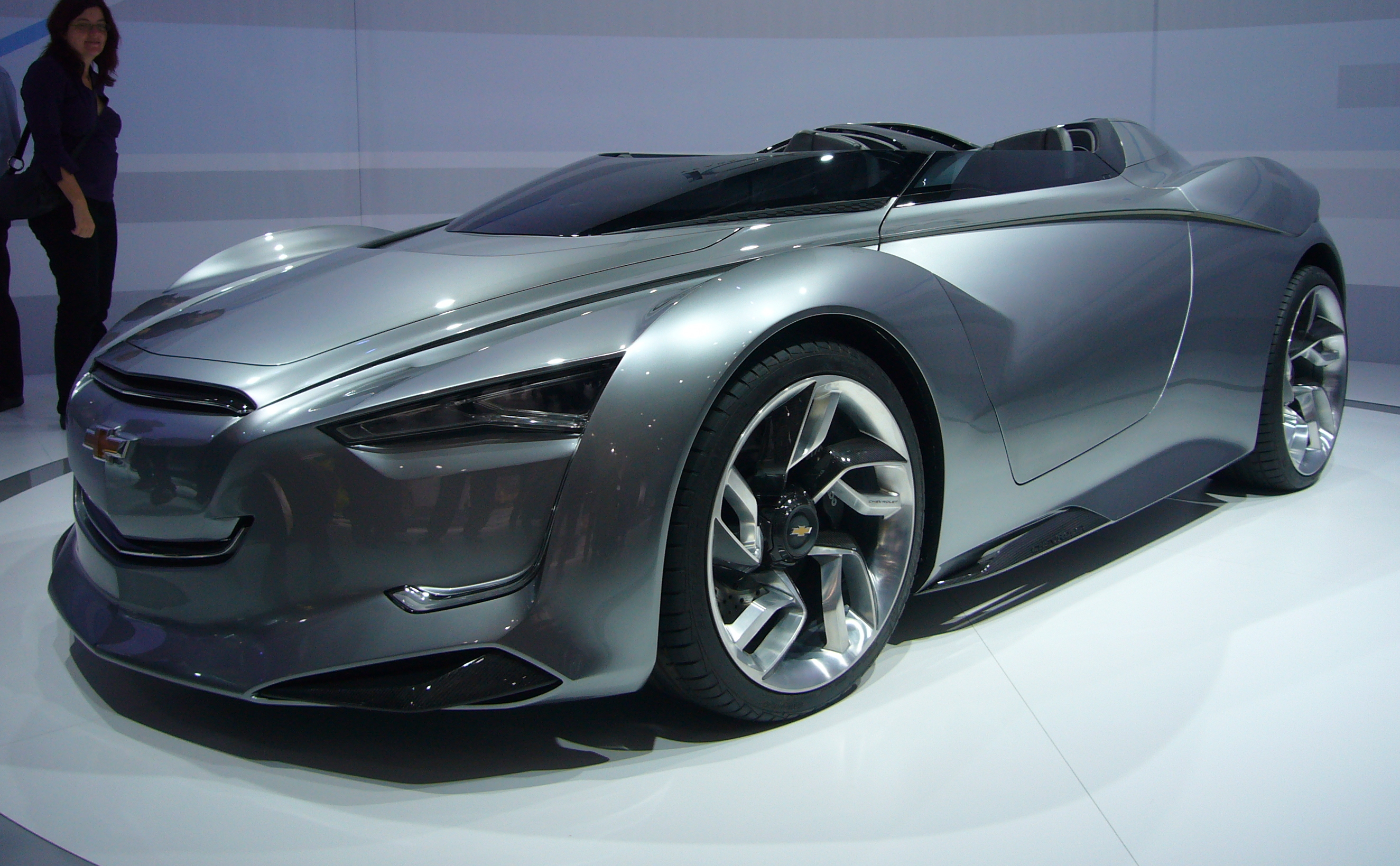
- Chevrolet Miray concept car.

Overview
- Manufacturer: Chevrolet (General Motors)
- Designer: Chevrolet Advanced Design team

Body and chassis
- Class: Concept car
- Body style: 2 door roadster
- Layout: M4 Layout
- Doors: Scissor

Powertrain
- Engine: 1.5 L (hybrid gasoline / electric)
- Electric motor: 15 kW motors (2)
- Transmission: Dual-clutch transmission
- Battery: 1.6 kWh lithium-ion battery

The Chevrolet Miray (Korean for "future") is a concept car designed, branded, and built by Chevrolet. Introduced at the 2011 Seoul Motor Show, the car showed a “mid-electric” concept.

== Design ==
=== Exterior ===
The exterior of the Miray is made of carbon fiber and has an angled groove on the side that lit underneath it. It has LED headlights and a dual port grill. At the rear, there are retractable flaps that give the vehicle additional airflow. The concept has aluminum-carbon fiber composite wheels that are 20 inches in the front and 21 inches in the back. Occupants enter the vehicle through scissor doors.

=== Interior ===
The interior is composed of brushed aluminum, natural leather, white fabric, and liquid metal materials. A projected instrument panel shows the performance of the Miray. The interior was inspired by the Chevrolet Corvette.

== Functionality ==
Instead of traditional side mirrors, rearview cameras emerge from the side windows while a front-facing camera shows real-time video that was overlaid on the GPS navigation.

== Gallery ==
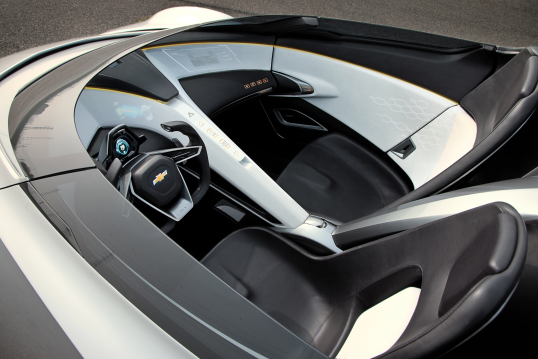
Interior

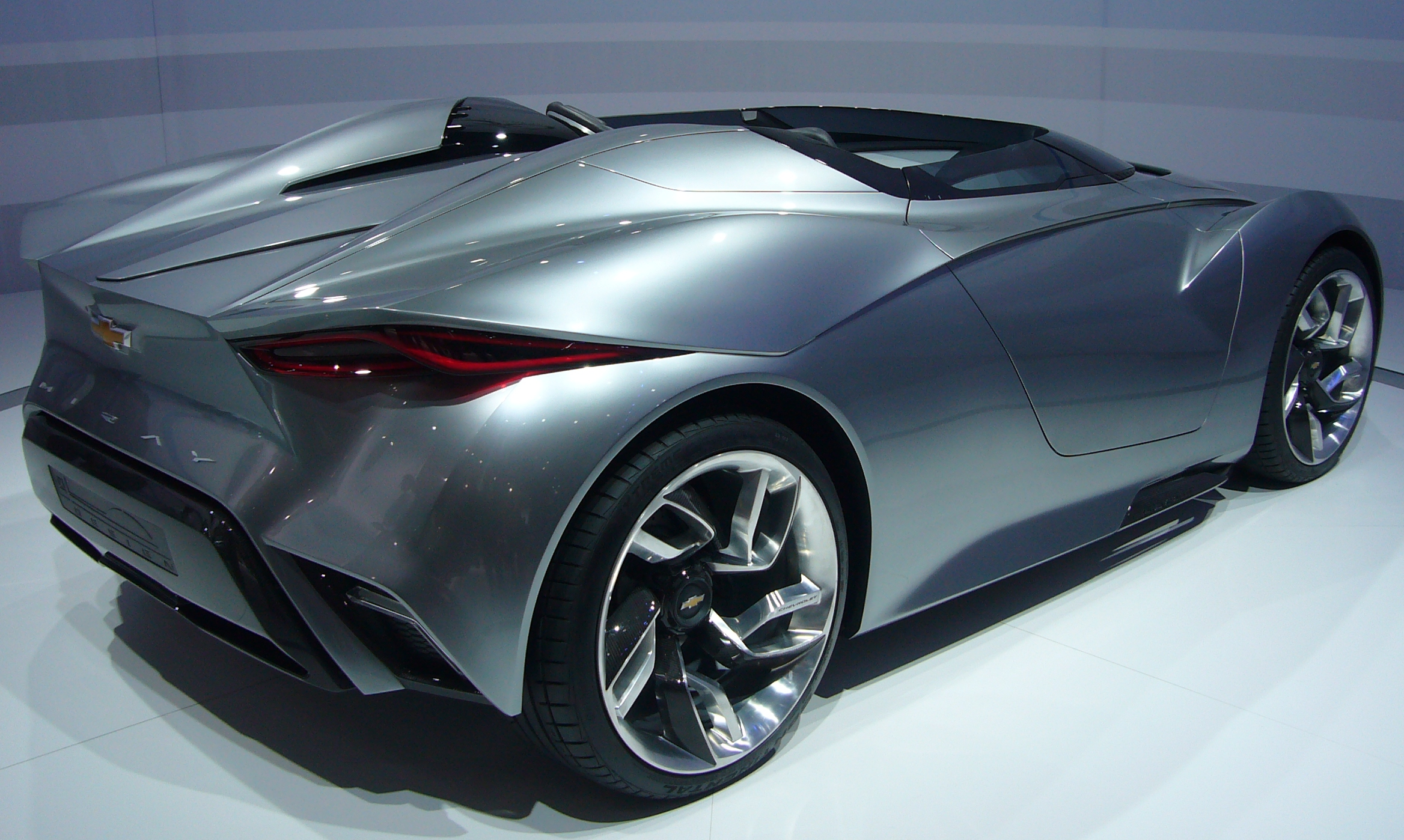
Rear ¾ view
