= Kia Naimo =

Kia concept vehicle

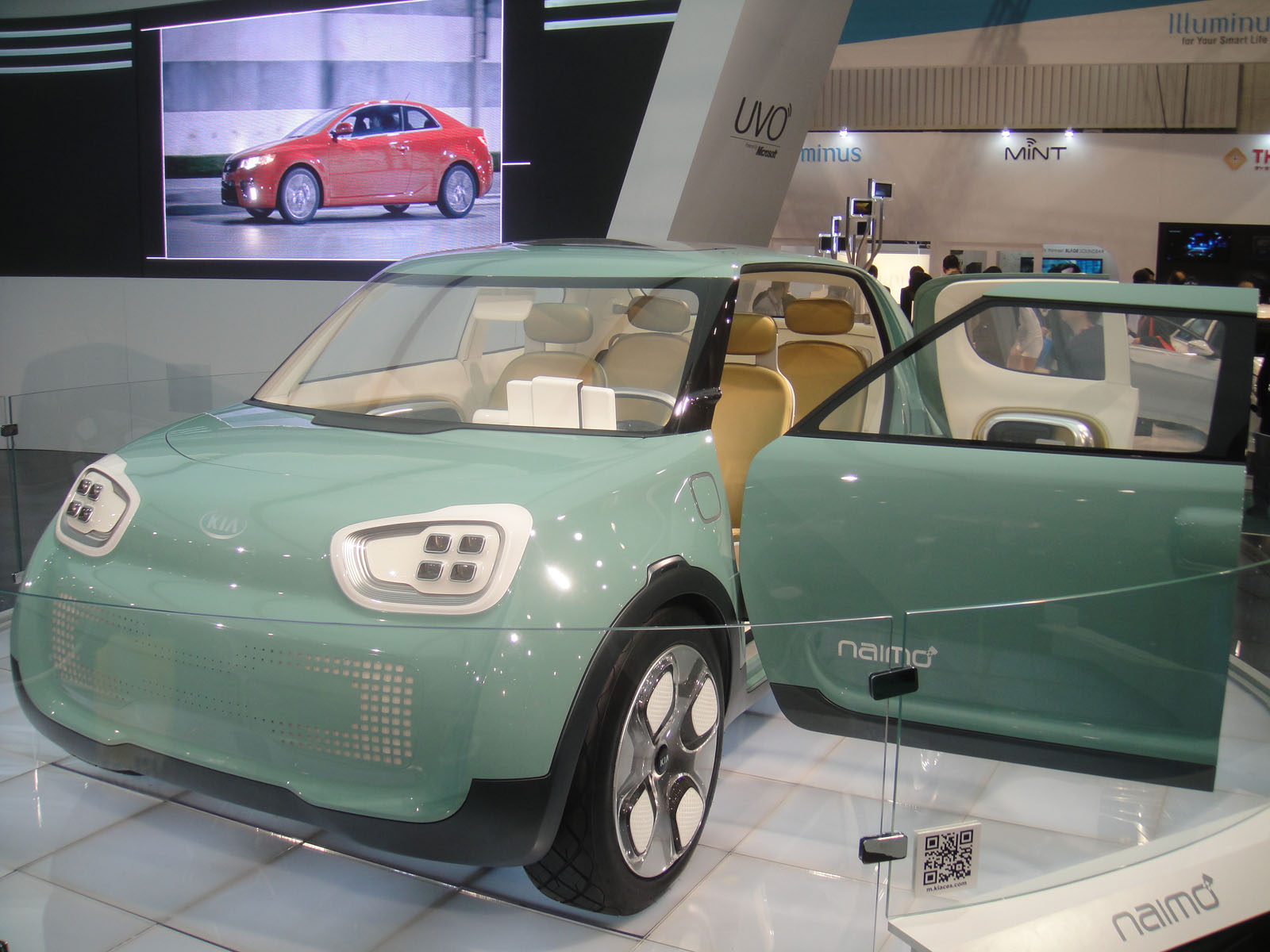
- 2011 Kia Naimo at the 2012 Consumer Electronics Show (front)

Overview
- Manufacturer: Kia
- Production: 2011

Body and chassis
- Class: Subcompact crossover SUV (B)
- Body style: 5-door hatchback

Powertrain
- Electric motor: 107 hp electric motor
- Battery: Twin-pack 27 kWh lithium-ion polymer battery

Dimensions
- Wheelbase: 2,647 mm (104.2 in)
- Length: 3,890 mm (153 in)
- Width: 1,844 mm (72.6 in)
- Height: 1,589 mm (62.6 in)

The Kia Naimo was an electric subcompact crossover SUV concept revealed by South Korean automobile manufacturer Kia at the 2011 Seoul Motor Show.

== Overview ==
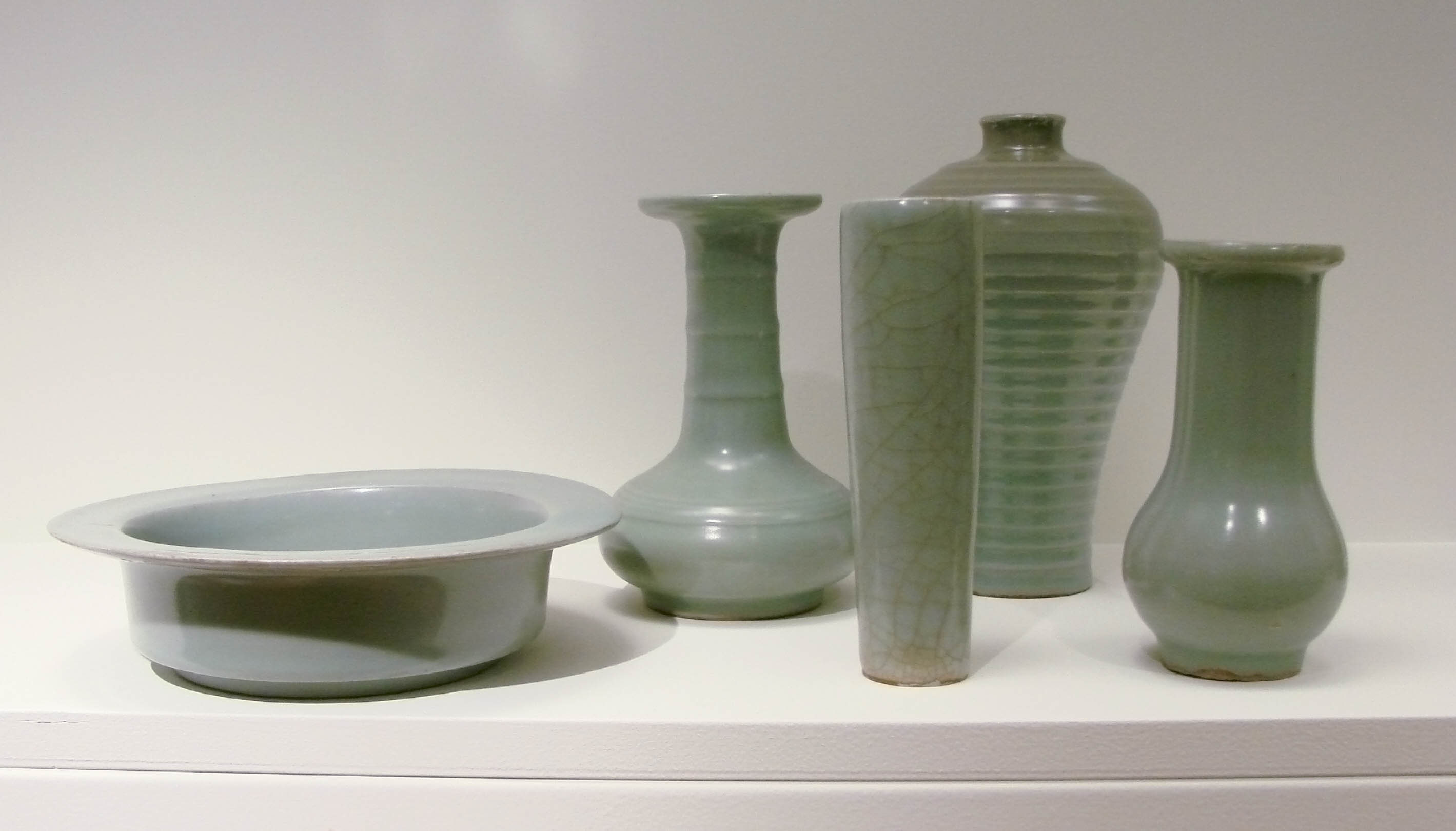
Celadon pottery is the inspiration for the design and paint color of the Kia Naimo.

The Kia Naimo concept was first revealed at the Seoul Motor Show on March 31, 2011, in Seoul, South Korea. It was a 5-door all-electric subcompact crossover SUV. Its name 'Naimo' is derived from ne-mo(네모) meaning "square shaped" in Korean, referring to its overall design. The concept's design was inspired by Asian celadon pottery, which are also glazed in the same celadon color used on the car.

== Specifications ==
=== Technical specs ===
The battery used in the Kia Naimo was a twin-pack 27 kWh lithium-ion polymer battery located under the boot floor, powered by a 107 hp electric motor. A quick charge system could fill the batter up to 80% in 25 minutes. The car has a top speed of 93 mph and a range of 124 mi (200 km).

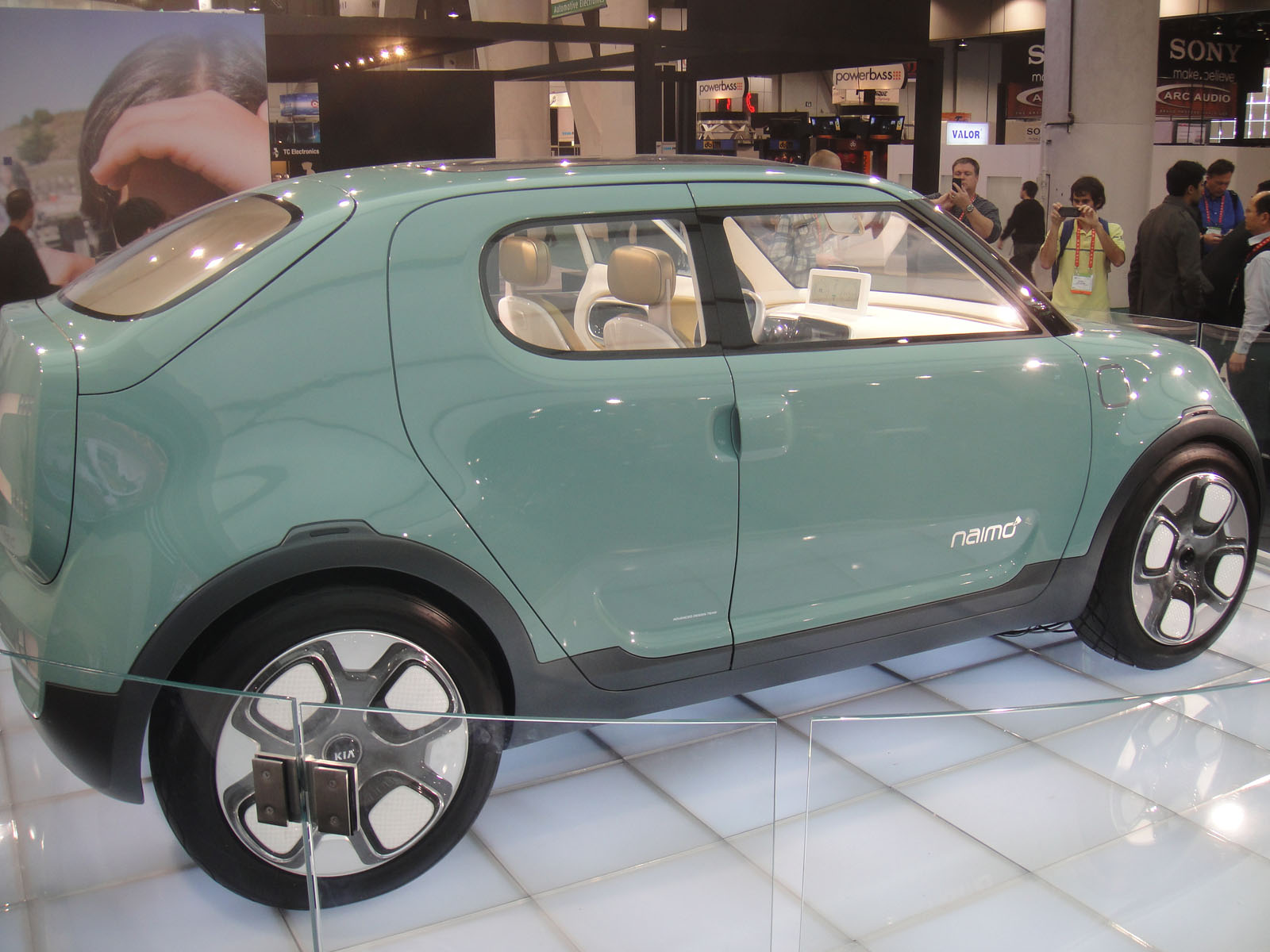
2011 Kia Naimo concept at the 2012 Consumer Electronics Show in Las Vegas, Nevada, United States

=== Exterior ===
Among its celadon-inspired design on the exterior, the Naimo concept featured an asymmetrical sunroof, dot-style LED headlights, an illuminated Kia logo on the rear, suicide doors, and other square-shaped accents.

The car lacked traditional side-view mirrors and windshield wipers, and instead had cameras and air-drying jettisons replacing them respectively.

=== Interior ===
The interior of the Naimo had four seats, which were colored yellow and white, and door panels with wood accents that continued the handcrafted theme present on the exterior. Each row featured central touchscreen control panels.
