= KC HiLiTES =

US manufacturer of driving lights

KC HiLiTES, Inc is a manufacturer of off-road lighting and roof racks, based in Williams, Arizona.

== History ==
The company was founded in 1970 in Saugus, California by Peter Kim Brown and his wife Carol Brown, and named using their initials. They were spurred to start the company when Peter began using landing lights from aircraft adapted to fit his truck, and realized that the way they were mounted would not stand up to the rigors of use of the off-road community of race buggies and pickups. Available lighting at the time was limited to 55-watt halogen lamps that were in Brown's words, "really disappointing in the desert". Initially he made a few sets for friends, but eventually began working with neighbors out of his garage assembling the lights, building the wiring harnesses and selling the packages to off-roaders and local shops. In 1974, the company was moved to Williams, Arizona where it remains today. Many race teams use KC's lamps, included pioneers Walker Evans and Ivan Stewart. Peter's step-son Michael Dehaas was the company owner for over a decade after purchasing it in 2004, and it is now owned by family members - Alan, Andy, and Mike.

== Products ==
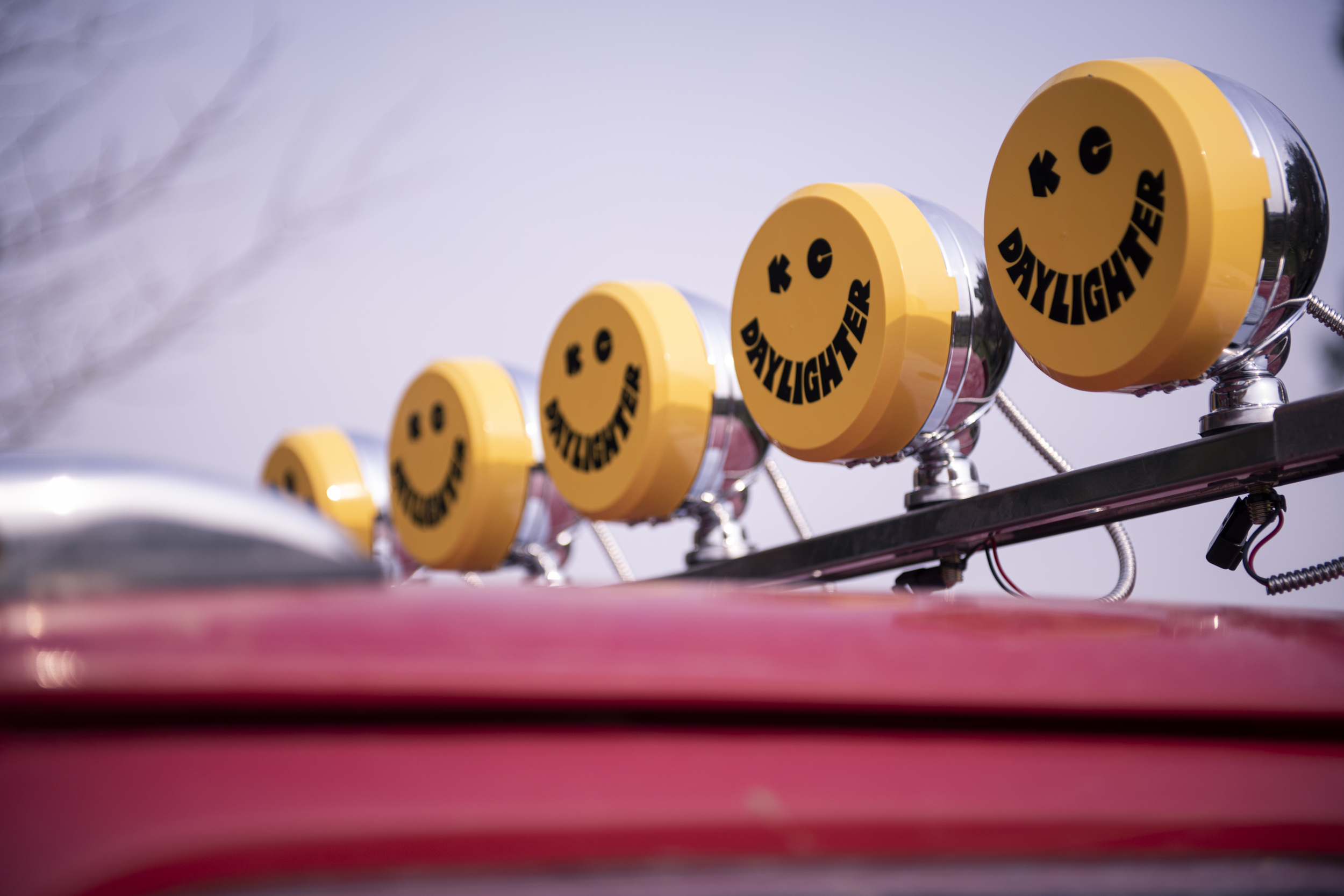
KC Daylighters with covers

The company's best-known product is the Daylighter off-road lamp. KC designed the special patented isolated rubber mount for the Daylighter when they noticed too many failures due to the severe vibration within the metal housing during off-road use. The firm worked with GE engineers over the intricacies of lighting, sealed beams, filaments, the varied types of construction, wattage and candlepower in order to devise a way to completely encircle the bulb in rubber, helping isolate it from damaging vibrations. In addition to the Daylighter, KC manufactured a wide variety of halogen products through the late 1990s, including flood lamps and driving lamps.

In addition to forward facing lights intended for either on- or off-road use, KC also offered accessories in their early years, including glare shields, interior map lights, and theft-deterrent light locks (security nuts).

In the 1990s, KC developed high-intensity discharge (HID) lighting, based on metal-halide technology. More recently, KC offers HIDs and LEDs for off-road use, and for commercial and industrial applications.

KC introduced a line of roof racks in 2025.

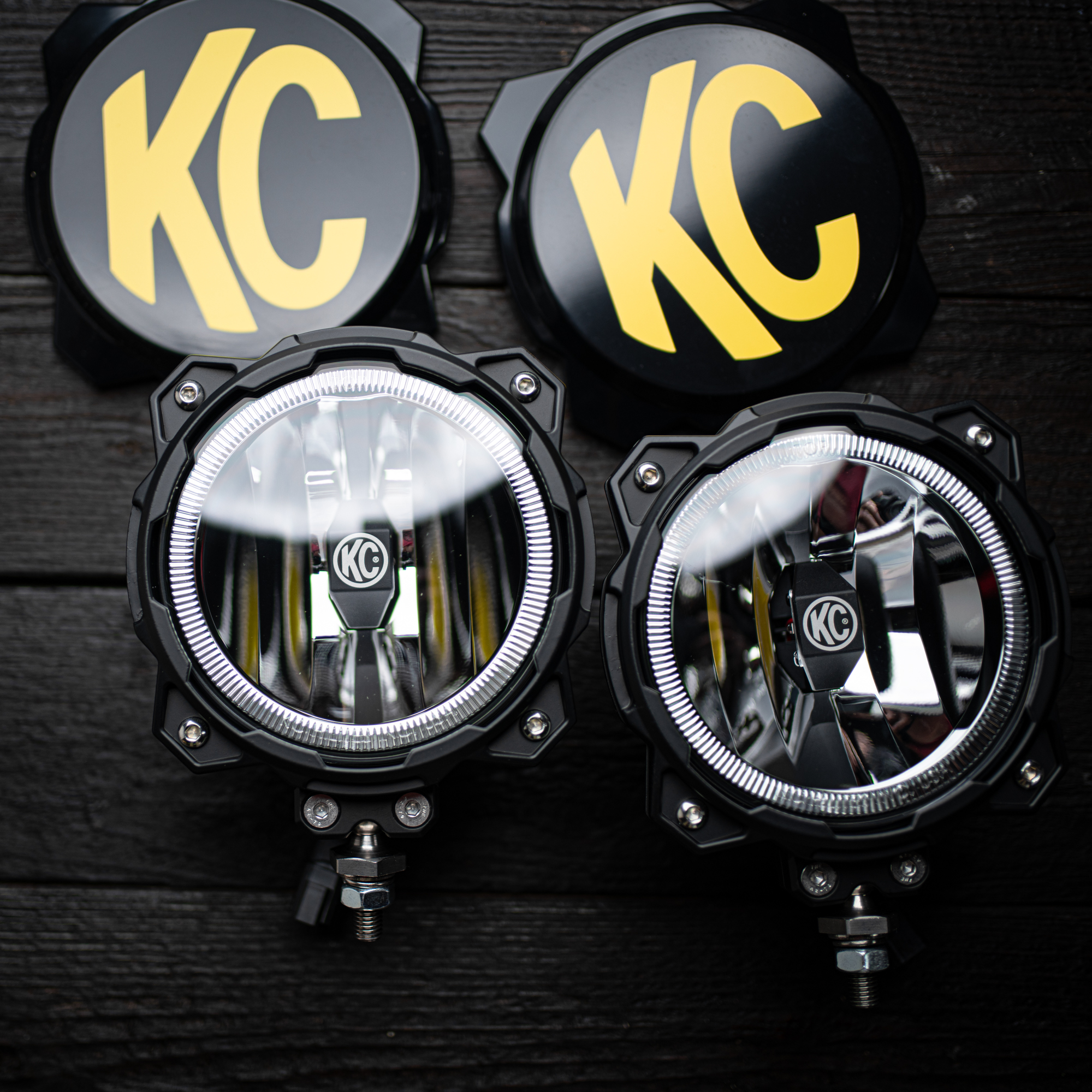
KC HiLiTES Gravity LED Pro6 lights
