= Alpha Wolf (pickup truck) =

American compact electric pickup truck

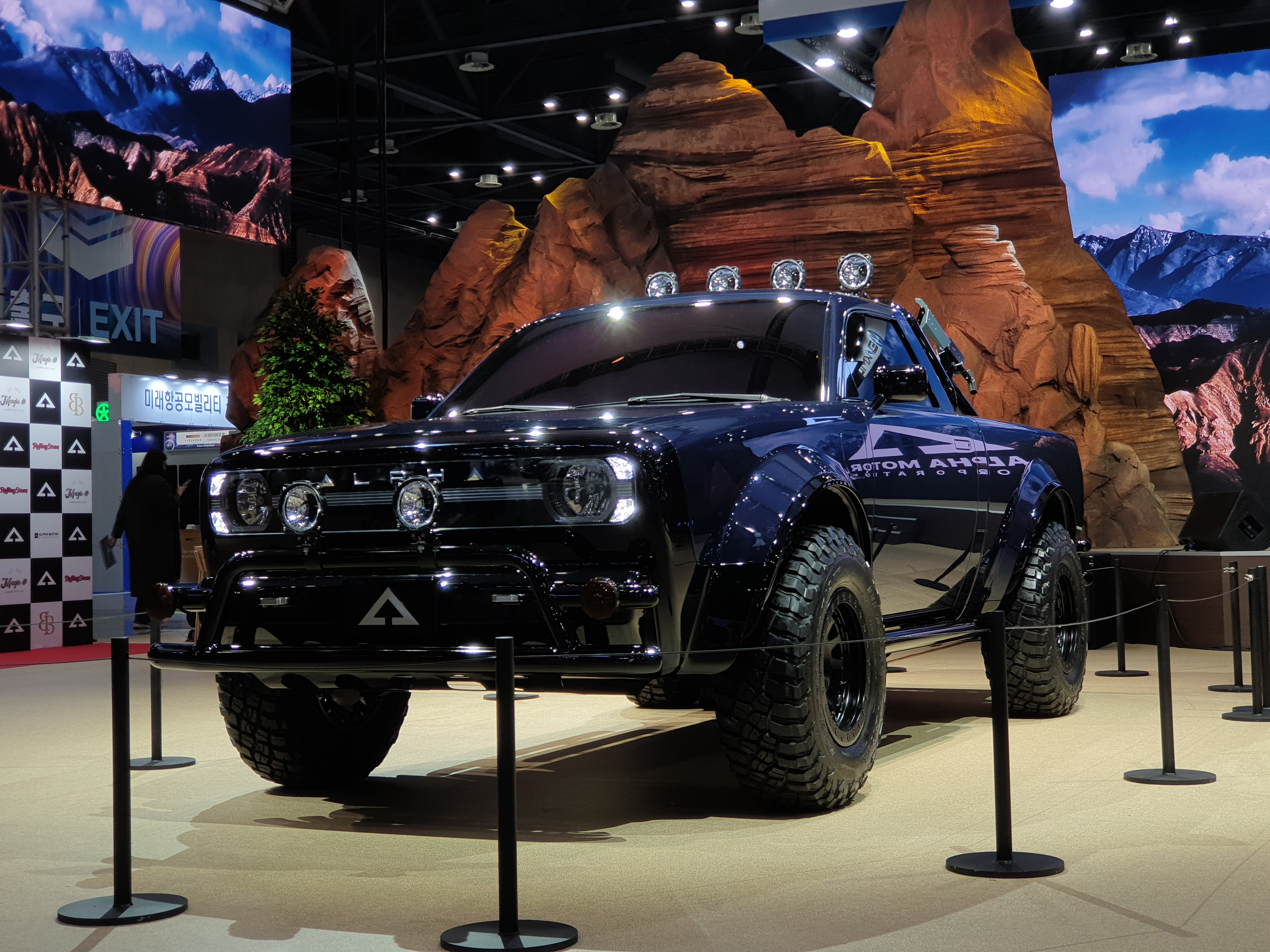

Overview
- Manufacturer: Alpha Motor Corporation
- Also called: Alpha WOLF+ (extended cab); Alpha SUPERWOLF (crew cab)
- Designer: Edward Lee

Body and chassis
- Class: Compact pickup truck
- Body style: 2-door pickup truck (WOLF); 2.5-door pickup truck (WOLF+); 4-door pickup truck (SUPERWOLF)
- Layout: Single motor, Rear-wheel drive (RWD) Dual motor, All-wheel drive (AWD)
- Platform: Body-on-frame
- Related: Alpha Ace; Alpha Jax; Alpha Saga

Dimensions
- Length: WOLF: 4,828 mm (190.1 in); WOLF+: 5,150 mm (202.8 in); SUPERWOLF: 5,450 mm (214.6 in)
- Width: WOLF: 1,930 mm (76.0 in); WOLF+: 1,980 mm (78.0 in); SUPERWOLF: 1,995 mm (78.5 in)
- Height: WOLF: 1,700 mm (66.9 in); WOLF+: 1,760 mm (69.3 in); SUPERWOLF: 1,760 mm (69.3 in)

The Alpha Wolf is an electric compact pickup truck concept by American electric vehicle company Alpha Motor Corporation.

== Overview ==
The Alpha Wolf was revealed in March 2021 as a 3D render of a 2-door off-road pickup truck. The styling resembled the company's previously-revealed models, the ACE and JAX. All of Alpha's vehicles only existed as 3D models, until Alpha Motor Corporation presented its first prototype, the WOLF electric truck, at the Petersen Automotive Museum, Los Angeles in August later that year.

The WOLF+ prototype debuted at the Seoul Mobility Show in March 2023, accompanied by the WOLF.

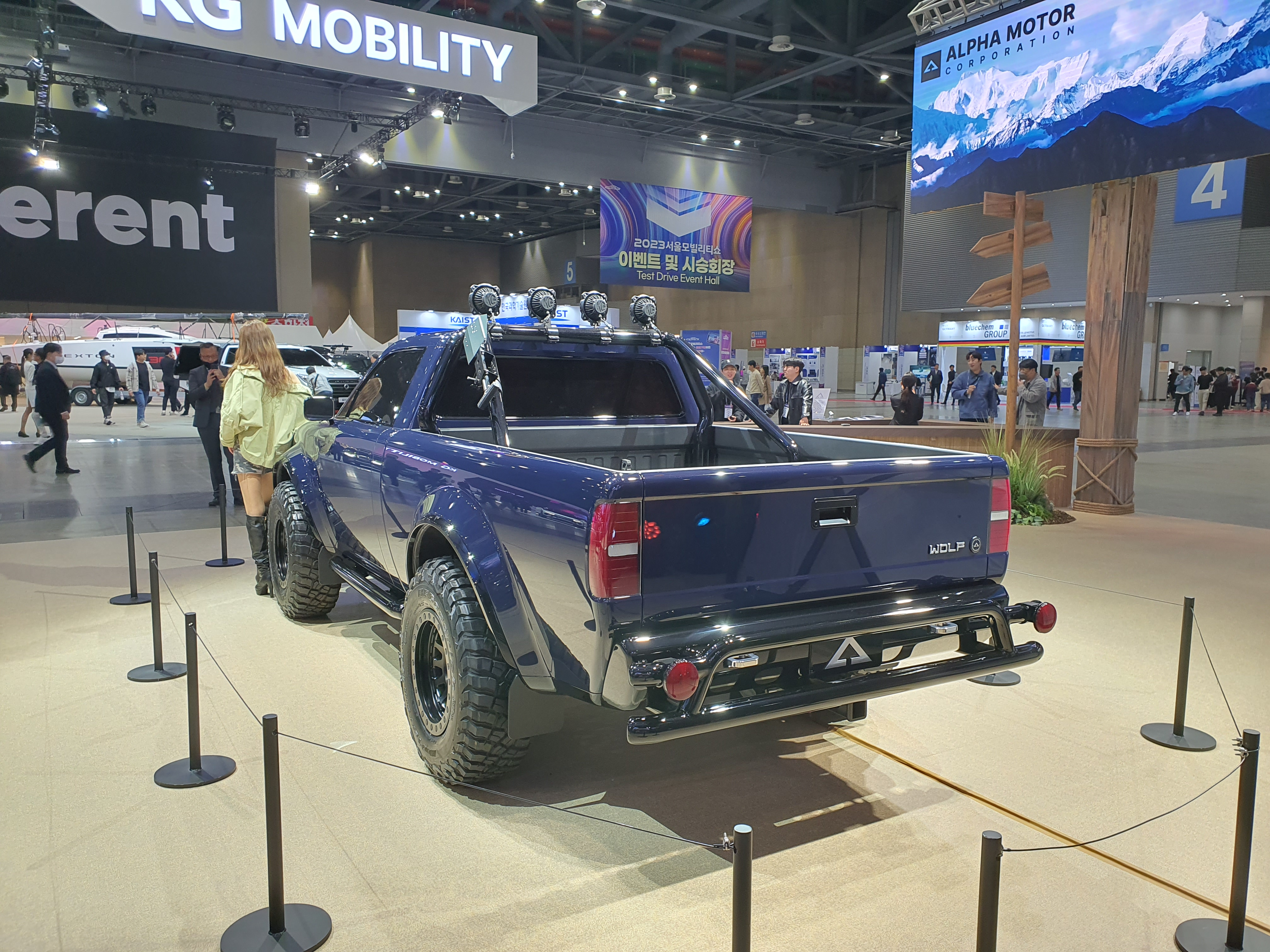
Rear View (WOLF)

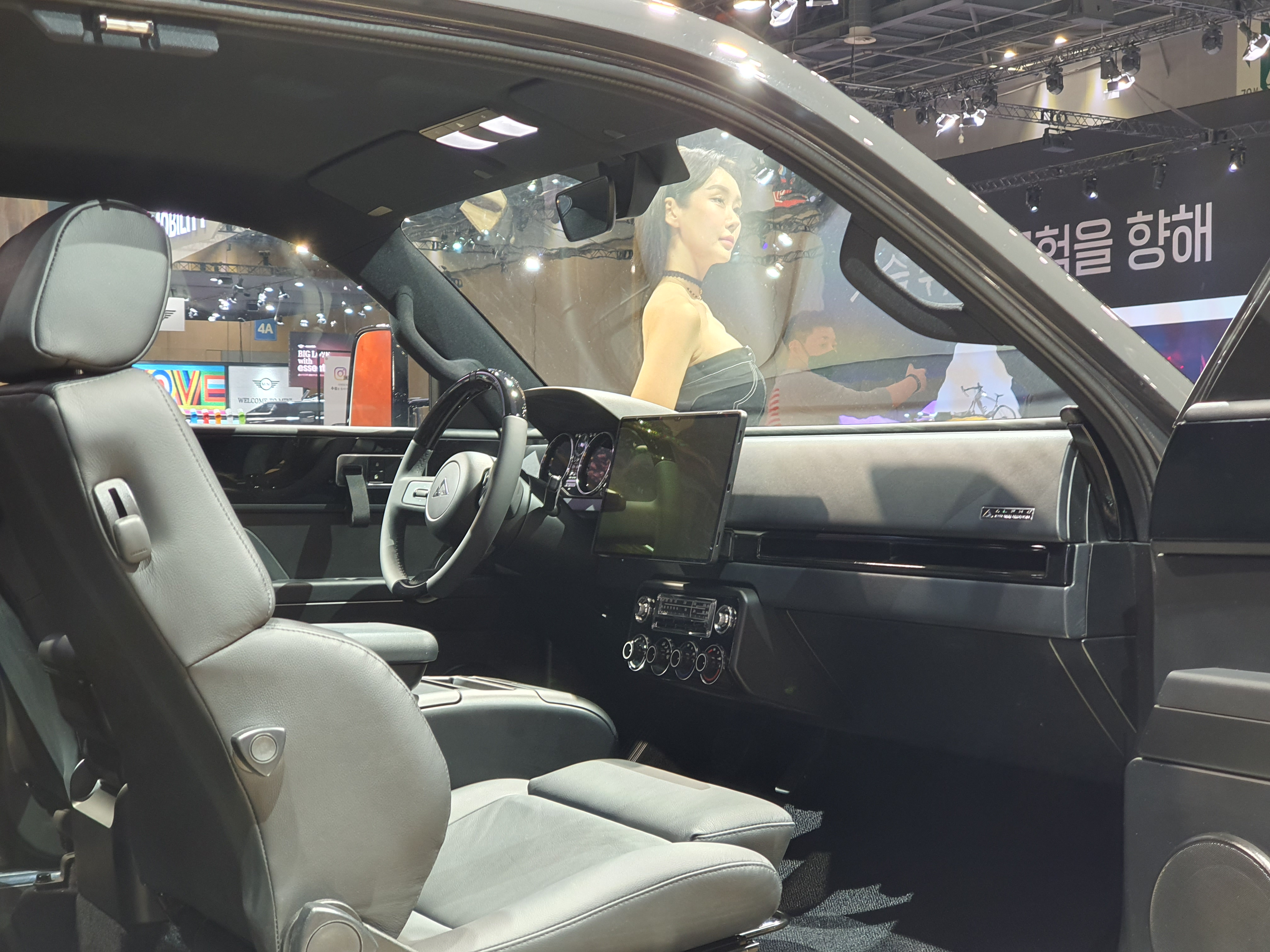
Interior(WOLF+)

In July 2023, Alpha Motor Corporation premiered its first driving footage of the WOLF electric truck in off-road conditions across the desert in Southern California.

== Specifications ==
The WOLF is estimated by Alpha Motor Corporation to have a range of over 250–275 mi (402–443 km) and a 0–60 mph (0–97 km/h) time of 6.2 seconds, as well as a towing capacity of 1,360 kg (3,000 lb).

== Variants ==
=== WOLF base model ===
The Alpha WOLF base model is the standard WOLF offered in rear-wheel drive (RWD) and all-wheel drive (AWD). Released in 2024, it was the first time Alpha revealed the WOLF without aftermarket accessories, hinting the entry-level trim of the electric truck.

=== WOLF+ ===
The Alpha WOLF+ is an extended cab version of the standard WOLF electric truck. It was revealed in April 2021.

=== SUPERWOLF ===
The Alpha SUPERWOLF is a crew cab version of the standard WOLF electric truck. It was revealed in July 2021.

=== ORYX ===
The Alpha ORYX is a light duty commercial version of the standard WOLF and WOLF+ electric trucks. It was previewed in April 2024.
