= Korea Automobile Manufacturers Association =

- Abbreviation: KAMA
- Predecessor: National Assembly of Korea
- Formation: July 1988; 38 years ago
- Type: Trade association
- Legal status: Non-profit organization
- Headquarters: 25 Banpodaero, Seocho-gu, Seoul, South Korea
- Region served: South Korea
- Members: 5
- Parent organization: National Assembly
- Website: www.kama.or.kr

- Korea Automobile Manufacturers Association
- Hangul: 한국자동차산업협회
- Hanja: 韓國自動車産業協會
- RR: Hanguk jadongcha saneop hyeophoe
- MR: Han'guk chadongch'a sanŏp hyŏphoe

Korea Automobile Manufacturers Association, or KAMA, is a South Korean automobile and motor vehicle association National Assembly in July 1988. KAMA is a non-profit organization, representing the interests of automakers in Korea.

== Members ==
- GM Korea
- Hyundai Motor Company
- Kia Motors
- KG Mobility
- Renault Korea Motors

== See also ==
- Automotive industry in South Korea
- Japan Automobile Manufacturers Association
