= Korea Petroleum Association =

- Hangul: 대한석유협회
- Hanja: 大韓石油協會
- RR: Daehan seogyu hyeophoe
- MR: Taehan sŏgyu hyŏphoe

The Korea Petroleum Association (KPA) is a South Korean oil, petroleum and lubricant association. It is headquartered in Yeouido-dong, Yeongdeungpo-gu, Seoul, South Korea.

== Members ==
- SK Energy
- GS Caltex
- S-Oil
- Hyundai Oilbank

== See also ==
- Oil
- Refinery
- Petroleum industry
- Lubricant
- Chemical
- Economy of South Korea
