= SsangYong =

SsangYong may refer to:

- KG Mobility, formerly called the SsangYong Motor Company
- SsangYong Group, a defunct South Korean chaebol founded in 1939
