= SsangYong Group =

South Korean business conglomerate

- Founded: 1939
- Defunct: 2006
- Headquarters: Seoul, South Korea

SsangYong Group (Korean: 쌍용그룹; RR: Ssangyong geurup) was a South Korean chaebol (a Korean family-controlled conglomerate). Tracing its origins to 1939, by the 1970s it was one of the largest enterprise groups in the country, before disintegrating in the wake of the 1997 Asian financial crisis. Internationally, the group was best known as the parent of Ssangyong Engineering and Construction, SsangYong Cement, SsangYong Paper, Ssangyong Oil Refining, Ssangyong Investment & Securities, and SsangYong Motor Company among its many interests.

The name SsangYong is taken from the Hanja characters 雙龍, which translate literally to "Double Dragon."

== History ==
Kim Sung-kon established his first manufacturing business, Samkong Fat Ltd., in his native North Gyeongsang Province in 1939, profiting greatly. Kim used the profits to help charter the Koryo Fire & Marine Insurance Company in 1947, through which he acquired the Chosun Spinning Company's factory in Anyang, Gyeonggi, which became the Kumsung Textile Company. This factory was destroyed in the Korean War in 1950, but Kim rebuilt it in 1954 with assistance from the United Nations Korean Reconstruction Agency. By the end of the decade, Kumsung was the second largest textile manufacturer in the country.

=== Political influence ===
Kim was well-connected politically to the Syngman Rhee regime and was elected to the National Assembly in 1958 with Rhee's Liberal Party. After the May 16, 1961 coup which brought Park Chung Hee to power, however, he swiftly pivoted. In 2015, the JoongAng Ilbo published an account by Kim Jong-pil, first director of the Korean Central Intelligence Agency and later prime minister, which stated that Kim Sung-kon had requested that records of his earlier involvement with a leftist group in Daegu be suppressed in exchange for his loyalty to Park. Kim Jong-pil agreed to this, and Kim Sung-kon soon became a leading member of Park's Democratic Republican Party (DRP).

Kim became the leader of the so-called "TK group" in the DRP, consisting of himself (as party finance chair), Baek Nam-uck (policy director), Gil Jae-ho (secretary general), and Kim Jin-man (floor leader in the National Assembly). Named for their collective origins in Taegu and Kyongbuk (the spellings of Daegu and North Gyeongsang in the McCune–Reischauer romanization scheme), the TK group were highly influential in implementing Park's industrial policies during the Third Republic of Korea, channeling lucrative government contracts and adopting policies favorable to associates.

=== Expansion ===
Notably, Kim sold Kumsung Textiles in 1962 to invest in cement manufacturing in Gangwon Province. The SsangYong Cement Industrial Company, Ltd. would soon become Kim's most important holding, and the plant in Donghae City would expand into the largest cement factory in the world. Kim made further investments in support of the cement concern, purchasing Samwha Paper to package the cement and founding Kumsung Shipping to deliver it, companies which later became SsangYong Paper Co. and SsangYong Shipping Co.

After the 1973 oil crisis, Kim negotiated a joint venture with Mohammad Reza Pahlavi, the Shah of Iran, to build an oil refinery in South Korea. The Korea-Iran Petroleum Co., Ltd. was incorporated in 1976 and began construction of its refinery at Ulsan. The facility received its first oil tanker in 1980, and later that year the company changed its name to the Ssangyong Oil Refining Co., Ltd.

=== Final years of Kim Sung-kon ===
In his role as DRP finance chair, Kim pressured Gulf Oil to make contributions to the party. In 1975 testimony before the U.S. Senate, Gulf Oil chair Bob Dorsey revealed that Gulf had paid $1 million in 1966 and another $3 million in 1970; Kim had originally demanded $10 million in 1970. The 1970 payment was transferred to UBS and there is no indication these funds ever reached South Korea.

Kim's political career came to an end in 1971, when the TK group and Kim Jong-pil, by then prime minister, joined the opposition New Democratic Party in a motion to dismiss Oh Chi-sung, the minister of home affairs and a rival of Kim's. The TK group believed Park would not discipline them as they had backed the constitutional amendment that allowed Park to stand in the 1971 South Korean presidential election, but he summoned Kim and the others who had voted for the motion to the Blue House and had them beaten, leading to their resignation from the party and thus the National Assembly. According to some accounts, Gil Jae-ho was forced to use a cane after the torture, and Kim Sung-kon was further humiliated by having his mustache plucked out.

After the October Restoration self-coup, when Park assumed near-dictatorial powers, the Heavy-Chemical Industry Drive was adopted as national industrial policy, which heavily favored the chaebol, including SsangYong. In a partial rapprochement, Park appointed Kim president of the Korea Chamber of Commerce, but Kim died of a stroke in 1975 at the age of 62.

=== Second generation ===
The chairmanship of SsangYong passed first to Kim Sung-kon's eldest son, Kim Suk-won, who was only 29. The younger Kim continued SsangYong's aggressive expansion into new industries including construction, motor vehicles, and securities. Sales grew more than 18,000%, to ₩14.6 trillion in 1994, when he stepped down to attempt a political career, from ₩79.7 billion in 1974, the year before he took control.

His younger brothers Kim Suk-joon and Milton Kim were also deeply involved in the company's operations. Suk-joon became president of Ssangyong E&C in 1983, chairman and CEO of SsangYong Motor in 1994, and group chairman in 1995. Youngest brother Milton began as an assistant manager at SsangYong Investment & Securities in 1990, and rose to CEO in 1995. The brothers sometimes clashed on matters of management and strategy, Suk-won following the traditional business practices of their father and other chaebol, Milton introducing Western practices such as merit pay.

=== Automotive investments ===
Kim Suk-won was deeply interested in entering the auto manufacturing industry, and in 1986 the SsangYong Group acquired Dong-A Motor, which traced its history to Ha Dong Hwan Motor, founded in 1954. Dong-A manufactured jeeps for the U.S. military, as well as trucks and buses, and had acquired jeep manufacturer Keohwa in 1983. The following year, SsangYong purchased Panther Westwinds from the Jindo Corporation, and in 1988 the group was rebranded as SsangYong Motor Company.

In 1991, Kim Suk-won began a $2.5 billion expansion into SUVs and four-wheel drive vehicles. Over the next five years, however, the unit proved to be a financial drag, making ₩505 billion in losses and accumulating ₩3.4 trillion in debt. Cash flow was so tight that production of its first sedan, the SsangYong Chairman, was delayed 20 days, while development of other products was frozen.

=== Breakup ===
Kim Suk-joon, then chairman, began looking to sell parts of the conglomerate to raise cash, including negotiations with Samsung and later Daewoo for the automotive unit. He sold SsangYong Paper Co. to Procter & Gamble in 1997 to raise cash. This infuriated Kim Suk-won, who resigned from the National Assembly and resumed chairmanship, but the Asian financial collapse made it impossible for the chaebol to refinance their debts, putting the South Korean economy in crisis and leading to a $60 billion IMF bailout. Late in 1997, SsangYong Motor was sold to rival Daewoo, as Milton pushed Suk-won to sell the securities firm as well. Daewoo itself would collapse after bankruptcy and a related corruption scandal, and control would pass to a succession of corporate owners until KG Group acquired it in 2022.

SsangYong Group continued its restructuring over the next several years, selling its Riverside Cement unit to Texas Industries in 1998, and a share of SsangYong Oil Refining to Saudi Aramco in 1999. Two hotels and the Yongpyong Resort, which SsangYong had acquired in 1983, were also put on the block. Even a share of the cement company was sold, in 2000, to Tokyo-based Taiheiyo Cement.

Since the aggressive restructuring, the Kim family has continued to run SsangYong E&C, even after its acquisition by the Korea Asset Management Company (KAMCO) in 2002 and subsequent sale to the Investment Corporation of Dubai in 2015. They however were forced to relinquish control of SsangYong Cement, with Kim Suk-won stepping down in 2004.

== Units ==
Past units of the SsangYong Group include the following:

- Riverside Cement, now controlled by Texas Industries, Inc.
- Ssangyong Cement Industrial Co. Ltd., now Ssangyong C&E
- Ssangyong Cement (Pacific), Ltd.
- Ssangyong Cement (Singapore), Ltd.
- Ssangyong Engineering & Construction Co., Ltd.
- Ssangyong Investment & Securities Co., later Good Morning Securities
- Ssangyong Heavy Industries
- SsangYong Motor Company, now KG Mobility
- Ssangyong Oil Refining Co., now S-Oil
- Ssangyong Paper Co., now part of Procter & Gamble Korea
- Ssangyong Precision Industry Co.
- Yongpyong Resort

== See also ==
- Economy of South Korea
- List of South Korean companies
