= Ssangyong Engineering and Construction =

South Korean industrial company

Ssangyong Engineering & Construction Co., Ltd.
- Type: Public
- Industry: Engineering, Construction
- Founded: 1977
- Headquarters: Seoul, South Korea
- Key people: S. Joon Kim (Chairman & CEO)
- Revenue: US$ 1,498 MIL. (2012)
- Number of employees: 1,925 (June 2013)
- Website: www.ssyenc.com

Ssangyong Engineering & Construction Co., Ltd (Korean: 쌍용건설) was founded in 1977 in Shinchon-dong Songpa-gu, Seoul, South Korea.

The company is involved in various aspects of construction, including housing development, civil engineering, building construction, and plant construction.

Ssangyong Engineering & Construction Co., Ltd has finalized multiple large-scale projects both locally and internationally.

== History ==
The company was initially the construction arm of the South Korean chaebol SsangYong Group. Ssangyong Construction Co., Ltd was founded on October 18, 1977. It was renamed as Ssangyong Engineering & Construction Co., Ltd. in 1986 and began expanding overseas. The 1997 Asian financial crisis, which hit South Korea hard, led to the conglomerate's collapse due to the debts incurred by its automobile division. It eventually split up and its subsidiaries were spun off into separate companies under new management. These companies still retain the "Ssangyong" name but are not related.

== Performance ==
Since its founding in 1977, Ssangyong E&C performed 135 projects around the world. Projects totaling nine billion dollars in value throughout 20 countries including Singapore, Indonesia, Malaysia, Saudi Arabia, Jordan and India. The company has a portfolio that spans all areas of construction, ranging from buildings, roads, subways, railways, airports, harbors, dams, bridges, tunnels and plants. Particularly, in the hotel building sector, Ssangyong E&C completed approximately 13,000 guestrooms with its hotels around the world.

In 2010, Ssangyong E&C built the Marina Bay Sands Hotel in Singapore, sloping up to 52 degrees from the ground surface.

Three hotel buildings, uniquely linked together, look like two playing cards leaning against each other, crowned by a horizontal SkyPark elevated 200m above the ground.

This project involved 57 floors above ground (including the SkyPark), with 2,511 guestrooms in three buildings that were conjoined at the top.

Ssangyong E&C has constructed hotel projects such as Singapore's Raffles City, W Singapore Sentosa Cove Hotel as well as the Grand Hyatt Jakarta, the Hyatt Regency Guam and InterContinental Bali Resort. Ssangyong has also built the Jumeirah Emirates Tower and the Grand Hyatt Dubai Hotels.

Meanwhile, Ssangyong is involved in the construction of hospitals, including Singapore's New KK Hospital and Tan Tock Seng Hospital, as well as the Hospital Selayang in Malaysia.

Some other building projects undertaken by the company are Singapore's CapitaLand Headquarter Building, Oceanfront Condominium and the Kranji Racecourse, Jakarta's Stock Exchange; and Sarawak Provincial Mosque in Malaysia.

In 2012, Ssangyong has won a contract to build a Yale-NUS(the National University of Singapore) college campus in Singapore. And in 2013, Ssangyong has won a contract to build two St. Regis Hotel Projects in Indonesia and Malaysia.

As for infrastructure projects, Ssangyong is currently the design-builder of the Marina Coastal Expressway Contract 482 and the Mass Rapid Transit Downtown Line 2 Contract 921 projects; both of which are the largest and most challenging of their kind in Singapore's construction history.

Equally, in Seoul, the Seoul 923 Subway Station was built 15 cm below the existing lines in Seocho-gu.

In Indonesia, Ssangyong has undertaken reconstruction projects such as the Aceh road that had to be rebuilt following the tsunami disaster. Equally, in India, Ssangyong has built approximately 270 km of highways.

In 2012, Ssangyong has won an order from Iraq. Ssangyong E&C will build a water treatment plant and transmission and storage facilities in the cities of Halabja and Sulaymaniah in Iraq's self-ruled northern Kurdish region.

The company's construction experience in harbors includes the Busan Port Shinsundae Container Terminal, while currently Ssangyong is expanding the harbor facilities at the Port of Karachi.

Furthermore, Ssangyong also has an extensive track record in industrial plant projects and has built the Bunker-C Cracking (BCC) facility for S-Oil Onsan Plant as well as the Seosan Storage Tank mega-facility in Korea, the Tanjung Priok Tank Terminal in Indonesia, the Kharg Oil Tank and Karanj Gas Injection facilities in Iran.

Ssangyong is also a leader in the field of power plants, having completed Thermal Power Stations such as the Suralaya facility in Indonesia and Samcheonpo in Korea, as well as the Jeju Wind Turbine Power Station and Incheon Geomdan District Community Energy Supply.

In Saudi Arabia, Ssangyong E&C participated in the construction of the Jubail Desalination Plant. Other projects in this country include the Unaizah Sewage and Storm Water Disposal System, as well as the steel mill for Hadeed.
