= Kim S. Joon =

- Hangul: 김석준
- Hanja: 金錫俊
- RR: Gim Seokjun
- MR: Kim Sŏkchun

Kim S. Joon is the Chairman & CEO of Ssangyong Engineering & Construction Co., Ltd. and earned a bachelor's degree in Business Administration from Korea University in 1978.

He became President & CEO of Ssangyong E&C in 1983 and Chairman & CEO of Ssangyong Motor Company in 1994. In 1995, he took the posts of Chairman & CEO of Ssangyong Cement Industrial Co., Ltd. and Chairman of Ssangyong Business Group, then the sixth largest enterprise in Korea. Since March 1998, he has been Chairman & CEO of Ssangyong E&C.

Outside of Ssangyong, he served as Vice Chairman of the Federation of Korean Industries, Co-Chairman of the Korea-France High level Businessmen’s Club, Vice Chairman of the Korea-Japan Economic Association, and Vice Chairman of the Korea-China Economic Council. Currently, he holds the positions of Co-Chairman, Korean Party of the Korea-Singapore Economic Cooperation Committee, Vice Chairman of the Korea Employers Federation and Vice Chairman of the Korea-U.S. Economic Council.

He won the industrial service merit in 1986 and the order of industrial service merit “Silver Tower” the following year, both awarded by the Korean government. In 1991, he was conferred the “Gold Tower,” becoming the first winner in the construction field of the highest honor in industrial achievements.

In 1996, he was elected as one of the “Global Leaders of Tomorrow” by the World Economic Forum in 1996.

In addition, as a member of the economic delegation accompanying the President of South Korea, he visited India in October 2004; the three African nations of Egypt, Nigeria and Algeria in March 2006; and Turkey, Saudi Arabia and Qatar in the Middle East in February 2012.

He is the son of the late Kim Sung Kon, founder and former chairman of Ssangyong Group.
