= SsangYong WZ =

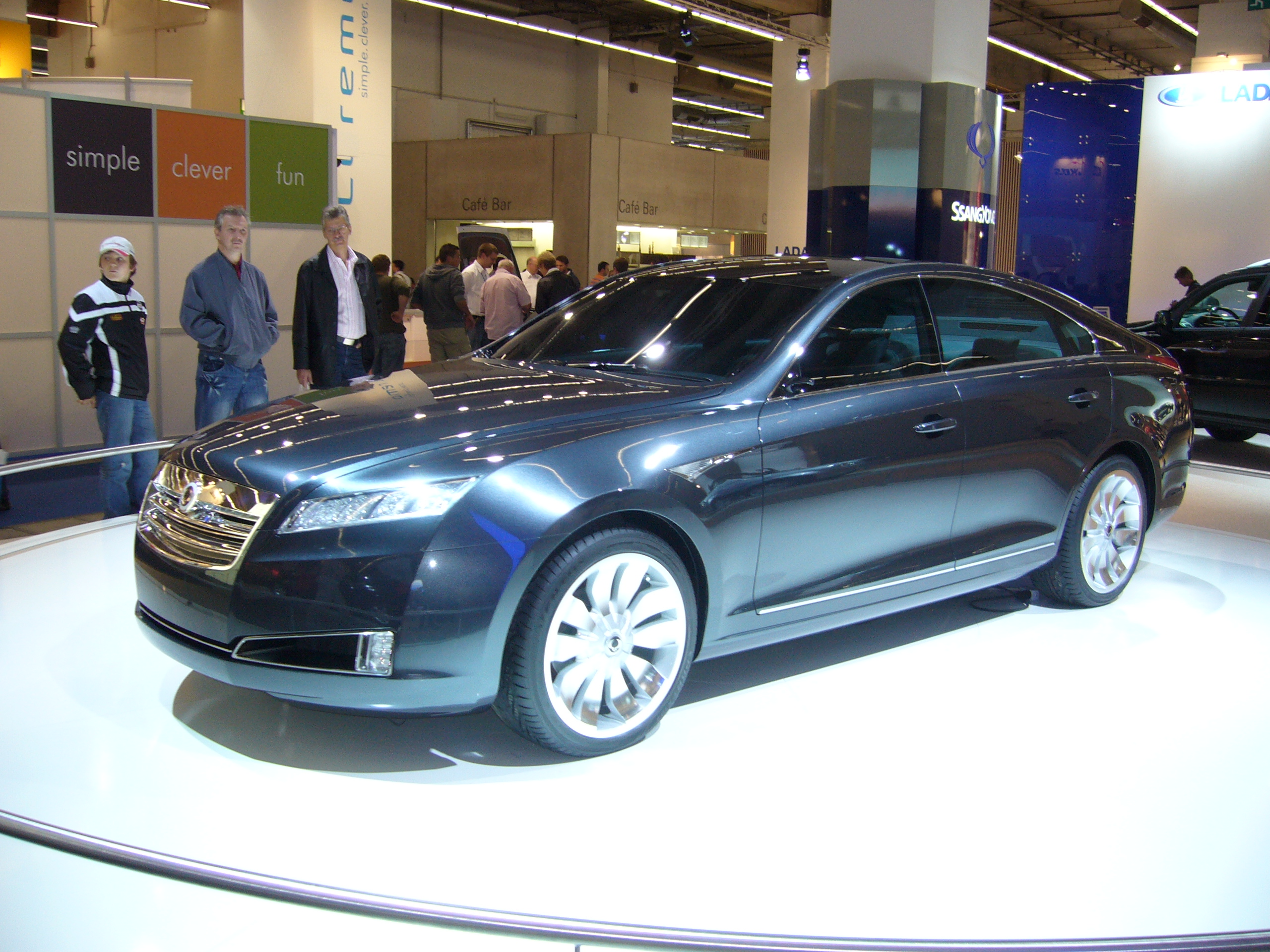

Overview
- Manufacturer: SsangYong Motor Company
- Also called: SsangYong World Zenith
- Production: 2007

Body and chassis
- Class: Grand Tourer
- Body style: 4-door sedan
- Layout: all wheel drive

Powertrain
- Engine: 3.6-litre V6 twin-turbo diesel
- Transmission: 7-speed automatic

The SsangYong WZ is a concept sedan made by the Korean manufacturer, SsangYong Motor Company. SsangYong says that 'WZ' stands for 'World Zenith'. At the vehicle's debut at the Seoul Motor Show, SsangYong stated: "The Wz packs the flagship Chairman's ultra-luxurious environment, while keeping SsangYong's excellence in design and engineering. Wz enters into a new field, parting from its traditional SUV designs, and emphasizes SsangYong's excellence in luxury." Features include: climate control, cruise control, airbags, Independent rear suspension, and ABS Brakes.

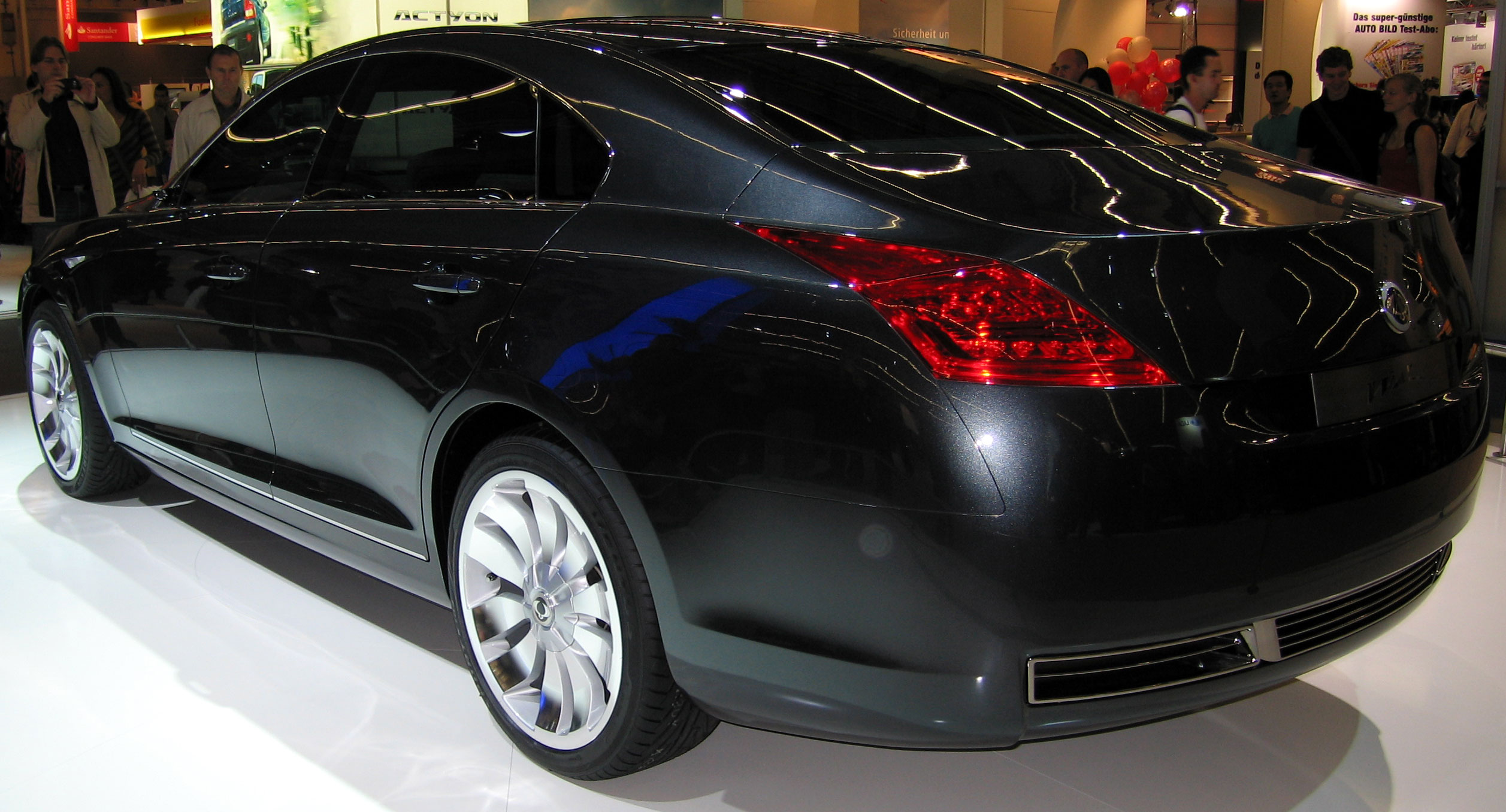
Rear
