= Procter & Gamble Korea =

Korean subsidiary of Procter & Gamble

P&G Korea (Procter & Gamble Korea Inc.; Korean: 한국피앤지) is a South Korean consumer goods company headquartered in Yeoksam-dong, Gangnam-gu, Seoul, South Korea. It is a subsidiary of American multinational consumer goods company Procter & Gamble.

The company was established as Seotong P&G (서통피앤지) in 1989, and changed its name to Korea P&G (한국피앤지) in 1993. It produces many popular chemical, food, paper, and personal care products, and has manufacturing facilities in Cheonan and Osan. The CEO of P&G Korea is Balaka Niyazee.

== History ==
Established in 1989 as Seotong P&G with capital of 11 billion KRW. In 1992 Seotong P&G 70 billion A sole investment South Korea Cheon-an Factory completion In 1993 the company changed its name from Seotong P&G to Korea P&G; with its capital increasing to 107 billion KRW. In 1997 Korea P&G merged with SsangYong Paper Co. Exports exceeded US$70 million in 1999.

=== Products launched ===
- 1989 Ivory soap
- 1989 Whisper toilet paper
- 1989 Pampers baby diapers (later renamed Cutie)
- 1993 Pantene haircare products launched
- 1995 Vidal Sassoon haircare products launched
- 1997 Pringles potato crisps
- 1999 Febreze disodorant
- 1999 Cutie Super Premium toilet paper
- 1999 Whisper Green/Whisper Fresh toilet paper
- 2000 SK-II cosmetics line
- 2000 Charmin toilet paper
- 2000 Attends adult briefs,
- 2000 Joy dishwashing liquid
- 2003 Head & Shoulders dandruff haircare products,
- 2003 Crest Spin electric toothbrush
- 2004 Wella haircare products
- 2004 Whisper Soft toilet paper
- 2004 Pantene Amino-Pro Vitamin shampoo
- 2005 Gillette shaving products

== Awards ==
- 2000: Receives Korea Logistics Award.
- 2001: Ranked 1st in Consumer Satisfaction Index by KCSI and NCSI, awarded 'Human Resource Management Award' by Korea Efficiency Association.
- 2002: Ranked 97th on Fortune's 100 best companies to work for, Vidal Sassoon is picked for Brand Power Award by Korea Efficiency Association.
- 2006: Ranked 3rd on Fortune's Most Admired Companies and 1st on Fortune's Most Admired Companies in the Consumer Goods Industry.
- 2007: Ranked 3rd on Fortune's Most Admired Companies and 1st on Fortune's Most Admired Companies in the Consumer Goods Industry.
- 2008: Ranked 2nd on Barron's Most Admired Companies, 5th on Fortune's Most Admired Companies, and 1st on Fortune's Most Admired Companies in the Consumer Goods Industry.

== Products ==
As of 2017, the products that the company produces are SK-II, Febreze, Gillette, Whisper, and Downy.

== See also ==
- Economy of South Korea
- Procter & Gamble
