= Roewe 950 =

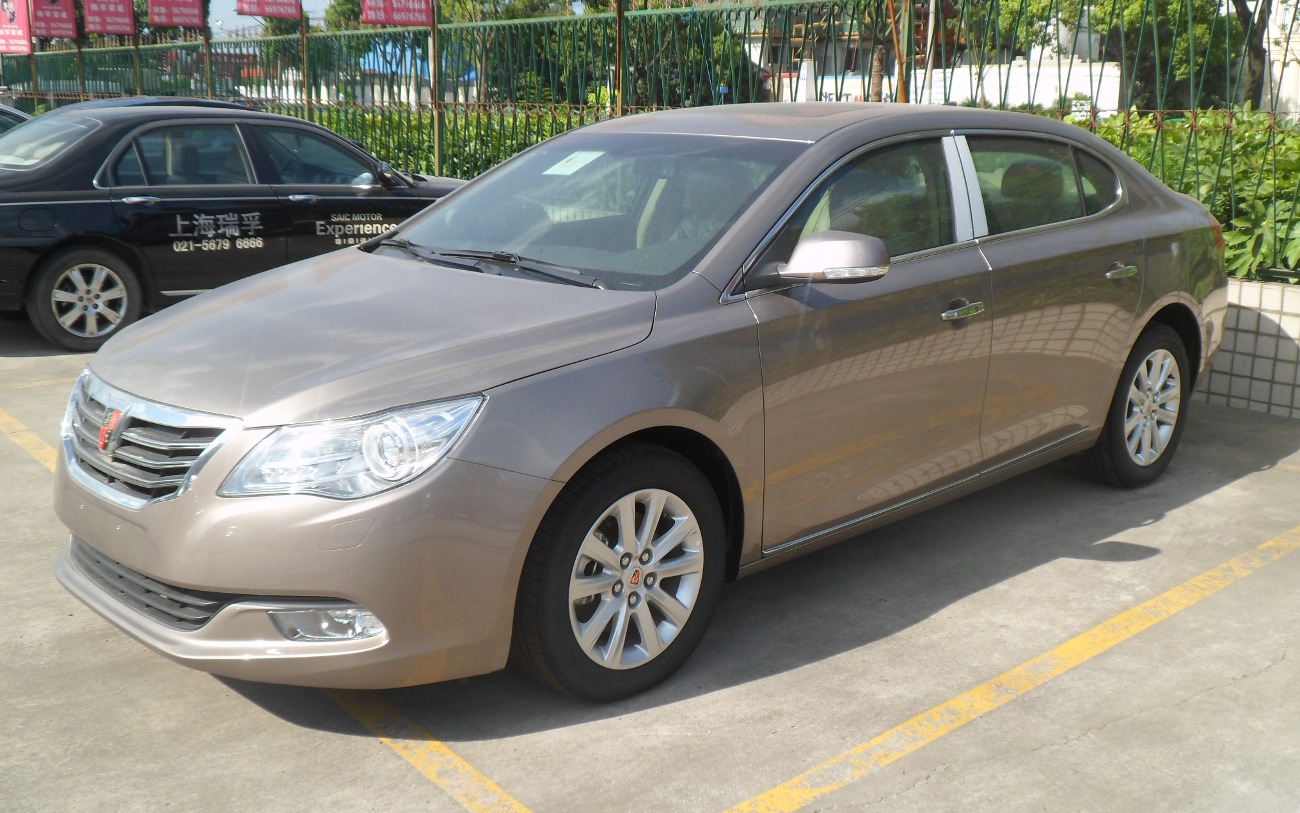

Overview
- Manufacturer: Roewe (SAIC Motor)
- Production: 2012–2019; 2016–2022 (e950)
- Assembly: China: Lingang, Shanghai

Body and chassis
- Class: Executive car
- Body style: 4-door saloon
- Layout: FF layout
- Platform: GM Epsilon II LWB
- Related: Buick LaCrosse

Powertrain
- Engine: 1.4 L SGE TGI I4 (turbo gasoline) (e950); 1.8 L TGI I4 (turbo gasoline); 2.0 L TGI I4 (turbo gasoline); 2.4 L LAF I4 (gasoline); 3.0 L LF1 V6 (gasoline)
- Electric motor: 56 kW (75.1 hp) Permanent magnet synchronous electric motor (e950)
- Transmission: 6 speed TST DCT; 2 speed automatic (e950)
- Battery: 11.8 kWh NMC lithium (e950)
- Range: 430 km (270 mi) (Fuel Cell)

Dimensions
- Wheelbase: 2,837 mm (111.7 in)
- Length: 4,996 mm (196.7 in)
- Width: 1,857 mm (73.1 in)
- Height: 1,502 mm (59.1 in)

Chronology
- Predecessor: Roewe 750 (FWD); Roewe R95 (RWD)
- Successor: Roewe D7

The Roewe 950 is a large four door saloon that is produced by Roewe in China, and is based on the 2010 Buick LaCrosse. It was first shown to the public at the 2012 Beijing International Motor Show, and commenced production in April 2012.

== Overview ==
The strong relationship between the 950 and Buick LaCrosse is a result of the SAIC-GM-Wuling joint venture, with Roewe owned by SAIC Motor. The 950 is powered by a range of General Motors engines. The four cylinder 2.0 litre produces 108 kW (147 PS; 145 bhp) @ 6,200 rpm and 190 N⋅m (140 lb⋅ft) @ 4,600, the four cylinder 2.4 litre produces 137 kW (186 PS; 184 bhp) @ 6,200 rpm and 240 N⋅m (177 lb⋅ft) @ 4,800 rpm.

The 3.0 litre V6 produces 190 kW (258 PS; 255 bhp) @ 6,800 rpm and 296 N⋅m (218 lb⋅ft) @ 5600 rpm, resulting in claimed a top speed of 215 km/h (133.6 mph). The only transmission option is a six speed automatic.

In July 2015, a four cylinder 1.8L engine was offered that produced 136 kW (185 PS; 182 bhp) and 290 N⋅m (214 lb⋅ft) and with the TST6 transmission produced fuel economy of 7.6 litres per kilometre (0.37 mpg_{‑imp}; 0.31 mpg_{‑US}).

== 2017 facelift ==
In July 2017, a major facelift was conducted on the 950, and the front view was updated to look in line with the later Roewe vehicles influenced by the Roewe Vision-R electric concept car. The rear view was also updated with new LED tail lamps and a horizontal chrome bar above the license plate.

== 950 Fuel Cell ==
The 950 plug-in hybrid fuel cell was unveiled at the 2014 Beijing Auto Show. The 950 Fuel Cell is a dual-power system consisting of a battery and a hydrogen fuel cell which produces 150 horsepower (110 kW) and has a range of 400 kilometres (250 mi) on the fuel cell which is extended with the battery to 430 kilometres (270 mi).

The 950 Fuel Cell become the first Chinese production fuel cell passenger vehicle when production commenced in 2016. As of October 2019, a 50 vehicle demonstration fleet had been produced for leasing and for the United Nations Development Programme (UNDP) demonstration. The fleet had travelled more than 500,000 kilometers. The 950 Fuel Cell was not offered to the public.

== e950 ==
The e950 plug-in hybrid was unveiled in November 2015 at the Guangzhou Auto Show and was launched in April 2016 at the 2016 Beijing Auto Show. The e950 has a SGE 1.4TGI turbocharged engine that produces 112 kW (152 PS; 150 bhp) and 235 N⋅m (173 lb⋅ft) with a hybrid system of two high-output electric motors, one 56 kW (75 hp) unit (TM) and another smaller motor (ISG) rated at 32 kW (43 hp) and a 11.8 kWh lithium-ion battery. The e950 has a driving range of 600 kilometres (370 mi) and is capable of fuel consumption as low as 1.7 litres per 100 kilometres (170 mpg_{‑imp}; 140 mpg_{‑US}). The e950 has a two speed automatic gearbox.

In 2017, a e950 '2017 facelift' was released.

== Gallery ==
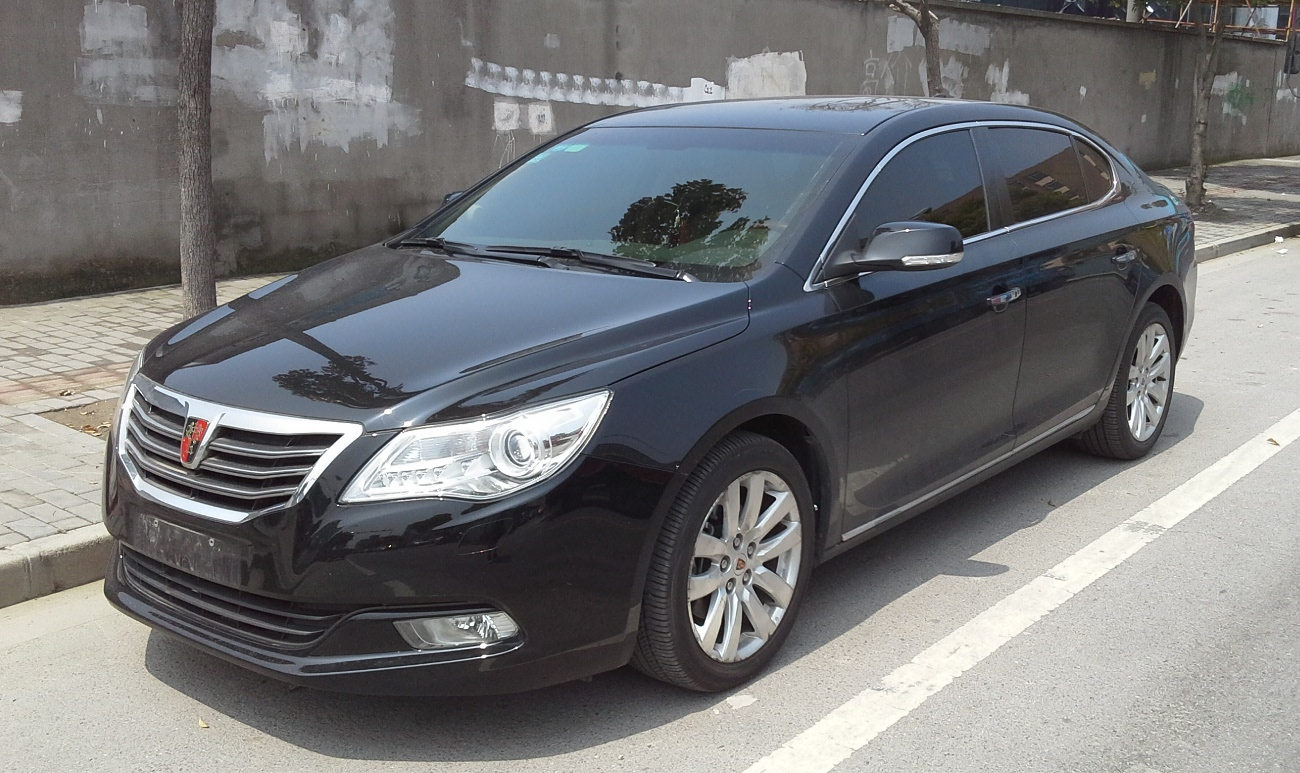
Pre-facelift Roewe 950 (front view)

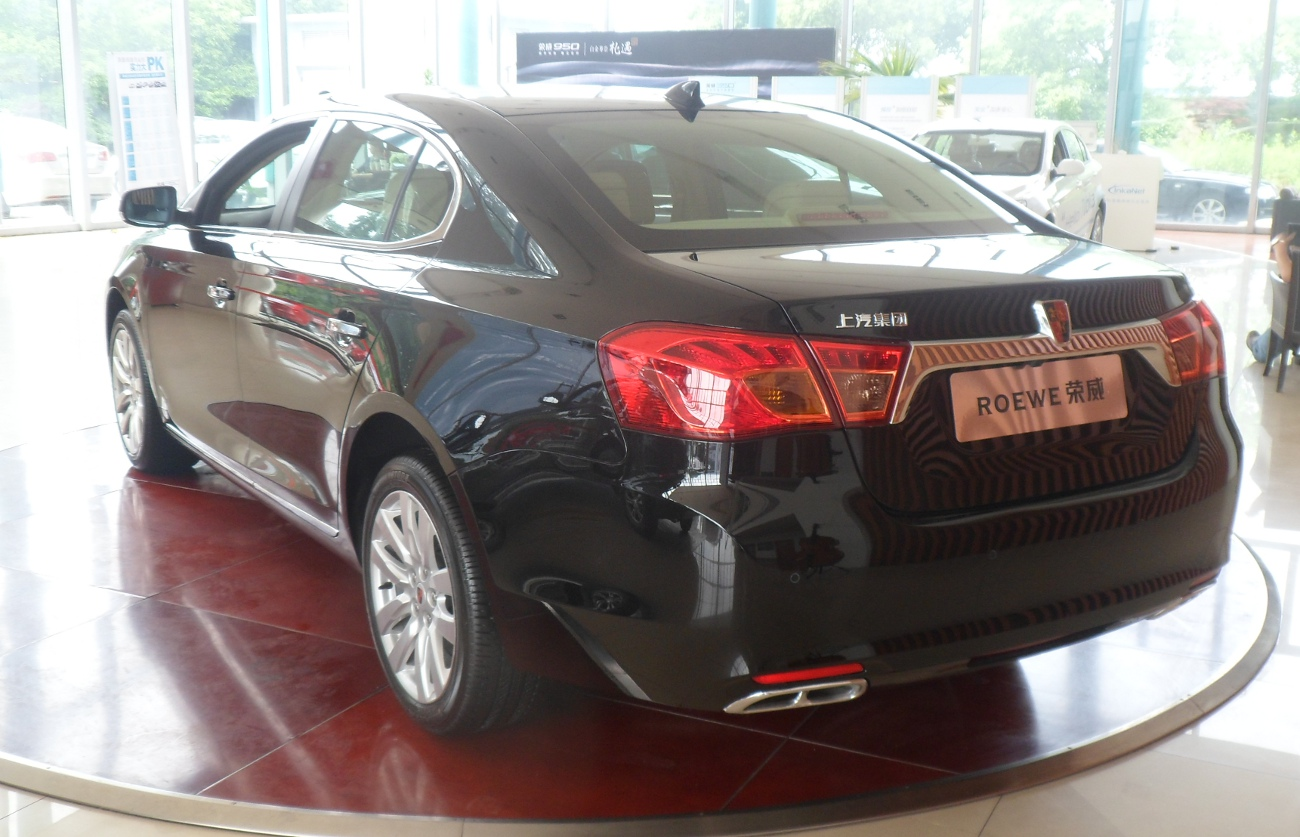
Pre-facelift Roewe 950 (rear view)

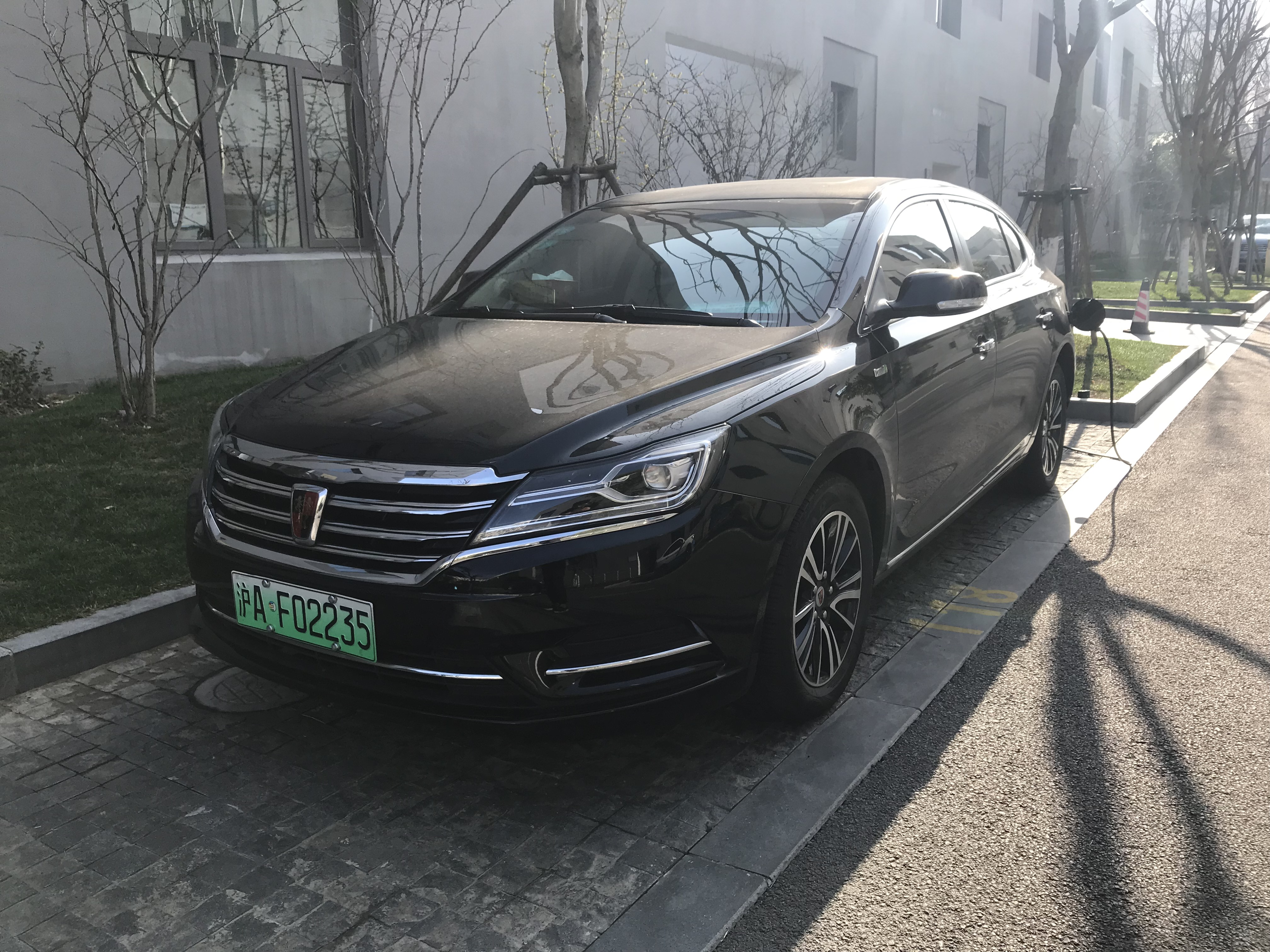
Roewe e950 (front view)

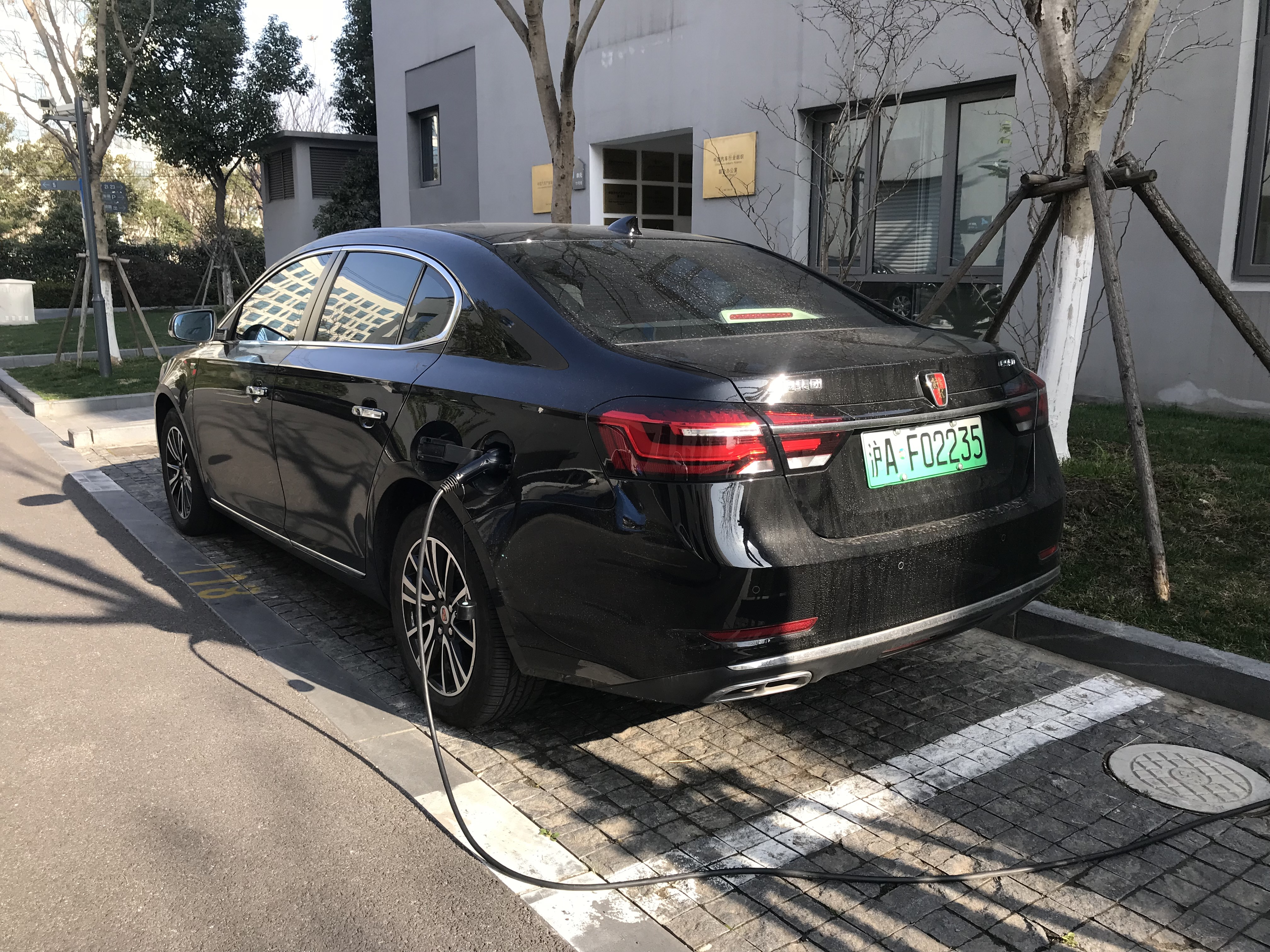
Roewe e950 (rear view)

== See also ==
- List of fuel cell vehicles
