= S-Oil =

South Korean company

S-OIL Corporation

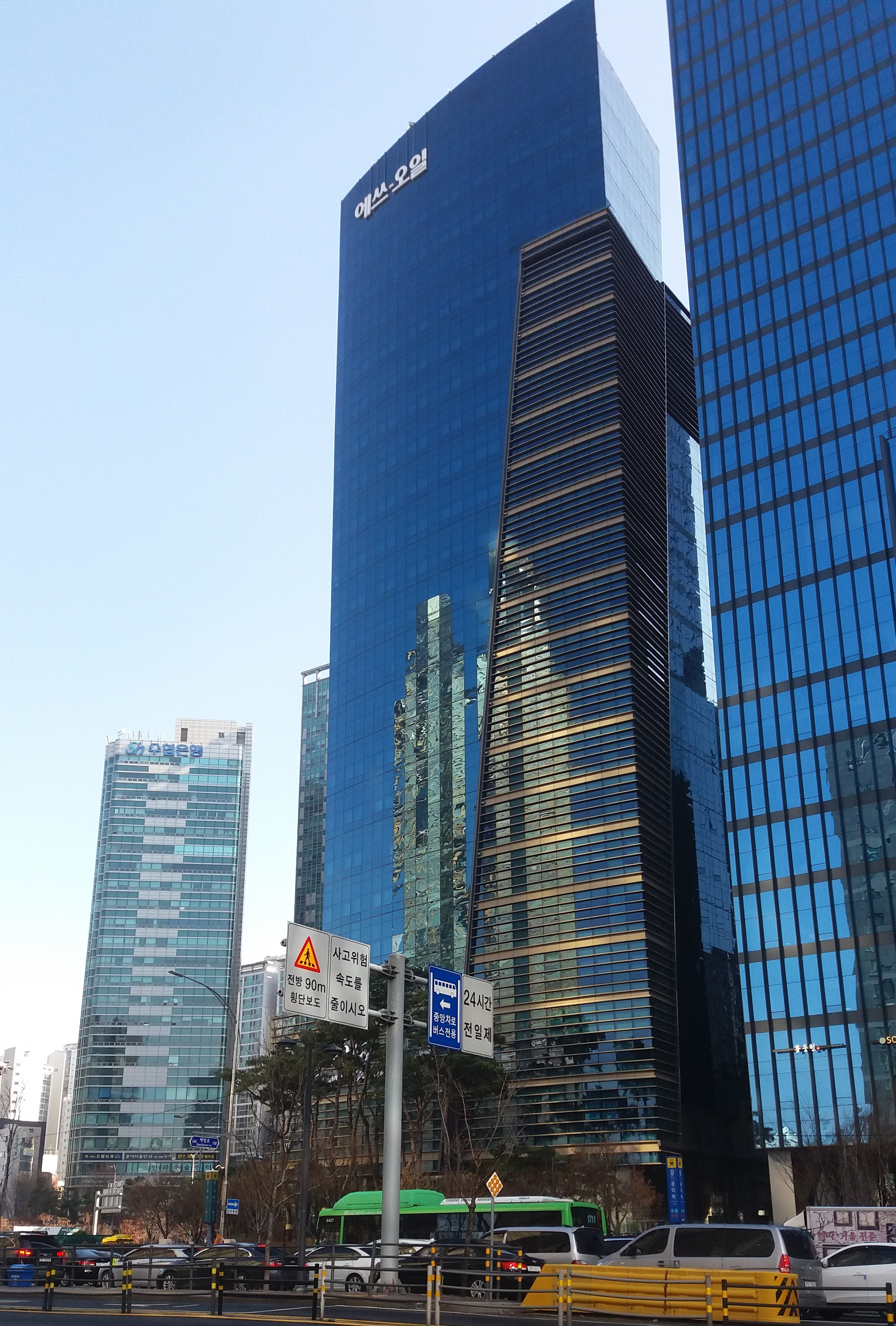
- Type: Public
- Traded as: KRX: 010950
- Industry: Oil and gas
- Founded: 6 January 1976; 50 years ago
- Founder: SsangYong Group; National Iranian Oil Company
- Headquarters: Seoul, South Korea
- Key people: Anwar A. Al-Hejazi (CEO)
- Revenue: ▲US$34.4 billion (2023)
- Parent: Saudi Aramco (63.45%)
- Website: s-oil.com

S-Oil Corporation (Korean: 에쓰-오일) is a petroleum and refinery company, headquartered in Seoul, South Korea. It was established in 1976 under its original name Iran-Korea petroleum company (Korean: 한이석유). It produces petroleum, petrochemical, and lubricant products. The company was listed as a Fortune Global 500 company in 2009 (Rank 441).

S-Oil's Onsan Refinery in Ulsan, South Korea has a capacity of some 650,000 barrels per day (103,000 m^{3}/d) in 2016.

== History ==
S-Oil Corporation was founded in 1976 as the Iran-Korea Petroleum Company reflecting early international collaboration. In 1980 Completion of the Onsan Refinery in Ulsan, South Korea, marking its entry into large scale refining. After Iran Revolution Iran's overseas investments were disrupted, and its stake in the South Korean venture became politically and commercially untenable. In 1980 The company was renamed SsangYoung Oil Refining Company, effectively ending Iran's direct involvement.

== Corporate governance ==
As of 9 May 2023, the Representative Director and CEO is Anwar A. Al-Hejazi.

== Ownership ==
In 1976-1980 The National Iranian Oil Company (NIOC), under the Shah of Iran, held a controlling major shareholder before breakup. Saudi Aramco bought a 35% interest in August 1991, and increased it to 65% in 2014. The common stock shares are traded on the Korea Exchange.

== See also ==
- Economy of South Korea
