= SsangYong Chairman =

SsangYong Chairman W/H
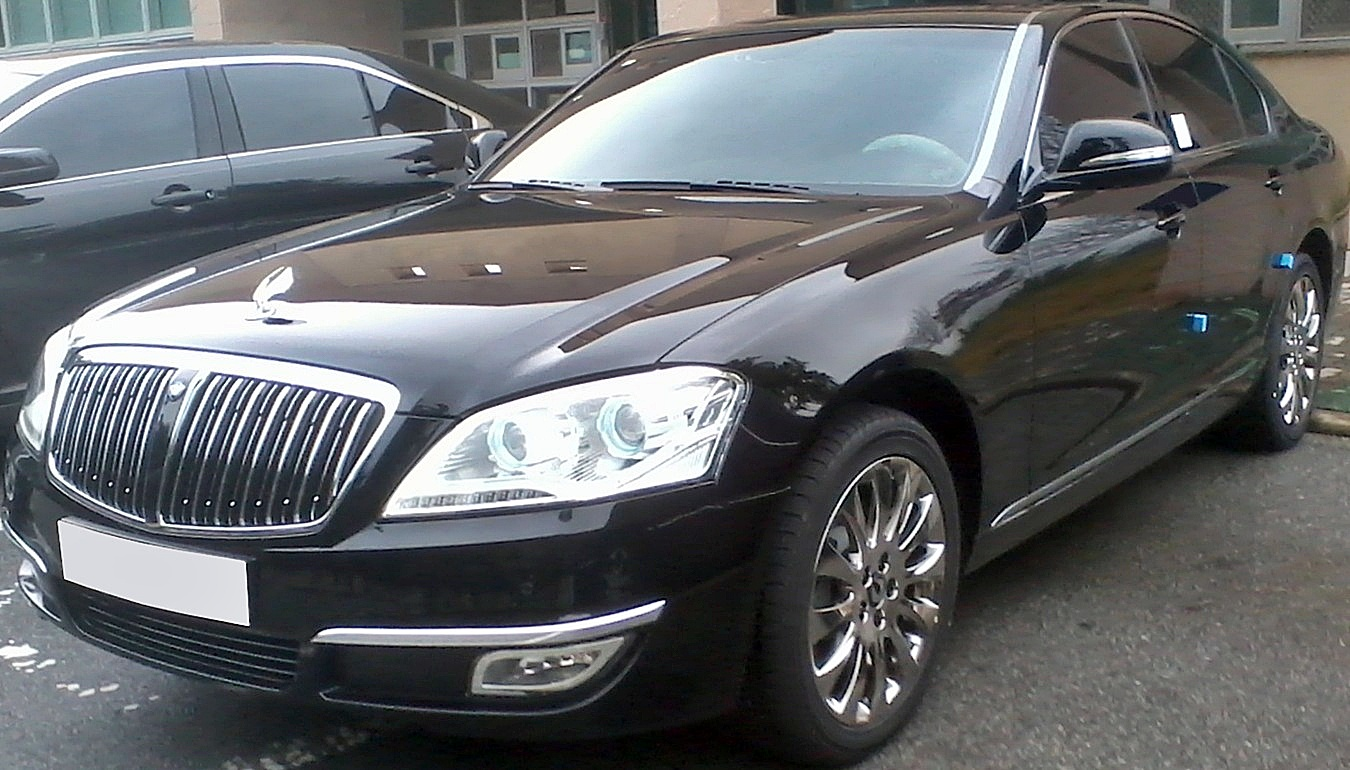

Overview
- Manufacturer: SsangYong
- Production: 1997–2017

Body and chassis
- Class: Full-size luxury car
- Body style: 4-door sedan

Chronology
- Predecessor: Daewoo Prince (Daewoo Chairman)
- Successor: Roewe 950 (Roewe R95)

The SsangYong Chairman (Korean: 쌍용 체어맨) is a full-size luxury car that was manufactured by South Korean automaker SsangYong from 1997 to 2017. The original model was renamed Chairman H in 2008, with a new model introduced in the same year and designated Chairman W.

== History ==
On release to the South Korean market in 1997, the chairman was a high-end executive sedan. Its manufacturer, SsangYong, was best known for SUVs and RVs, and the chairman has been its only sedan. The first generation chairman was built on the Mercedes-Benz E-Class (W124) platform, but styled more like a modernized W140 S-Class. Coincidentally, the design also foretold that of the upcoming W220 S-Class, which led to some consternation at the German company. Mercedes-Benz requested that Ssangyong redesign the car to make it look less like a Mercedes-Benz and to refrain from selling it in developed export markets such as Europe and the United States.

== First generation (Chairman H; 1997–2011) ==
Chairman H
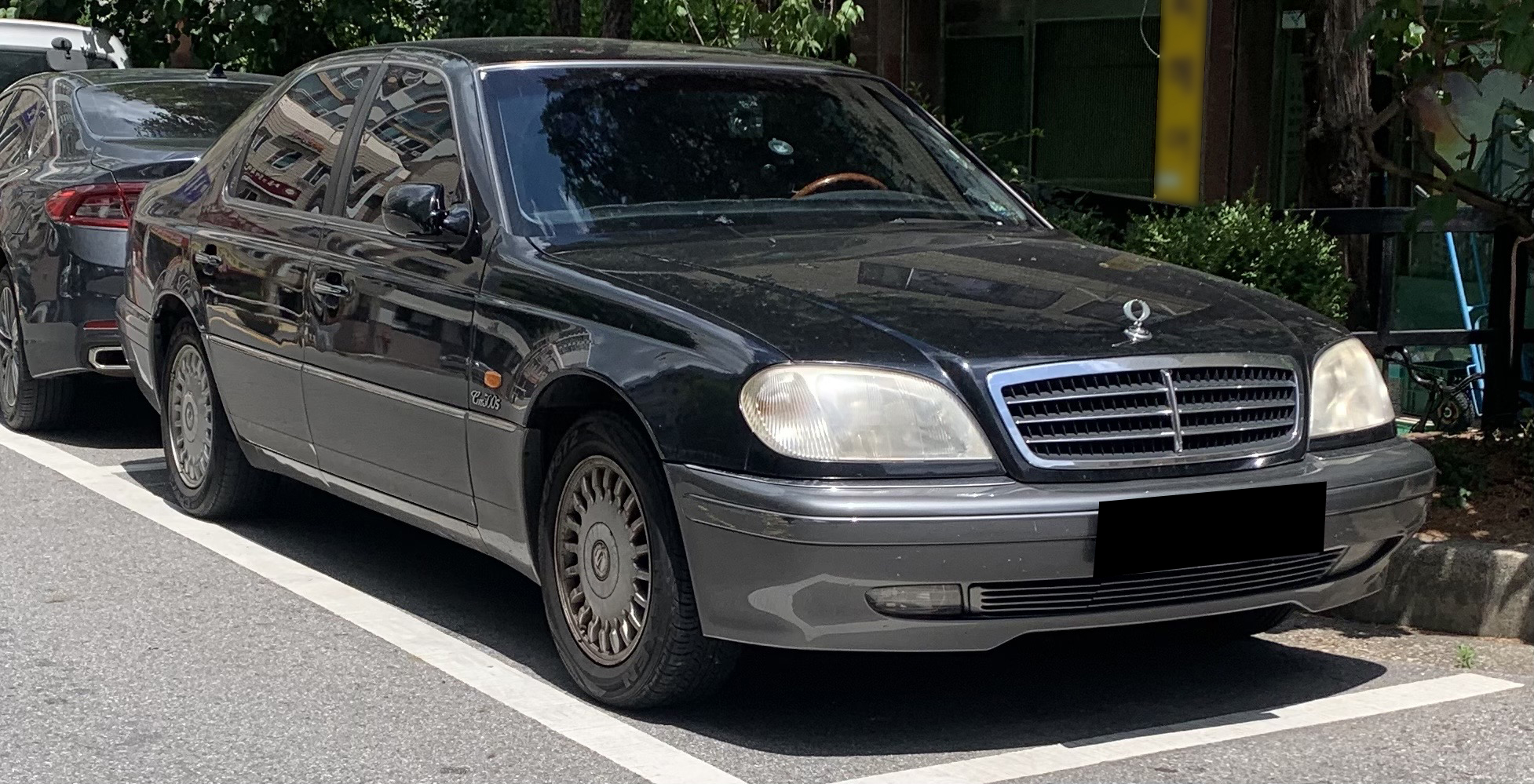

Overview
- Also called: Daewoo Chairman; Pyeonghwa Junma/Zumma (North Korea)
- Production: 1997–2014
- Assembly: South Korea: Pyeongtaek; Iran: Topco

Body and chassis
- Layout: Front-engine, rear-wheel-drive
- Related: Mercedes-Benz W124

Powertrain
- Engine: 2.3 L M-B M111 I4; 2.8 L M-B M104.94x I6; 3.2 L M-B M104.99x I6; 3.6 L M-B M104.941 I6 (from 2007)
- Transmission: 5-speed automatic (5G-Tronic)

Dimensions
- Wheelbase: 2,900 mm (114.2 in)
- Length: 5,055 mm (199.0 in) (1997–2003); 5,135 mm (202.2 in) (2003–2008); 5,110 mm (201.2 in) (2008–2011); 5,050 mm (198.8 in) (2011–2014)
- Width: 1,825 mm (71.9 in)
- Height: 1,465 mm (57.7 in)

SsangYong renamed the original pre-2008 Chairman model as Chairman H (which has the same design as the 2003–2008 model) to differentiate from the Chairman W. Chairman H kept the same exterior, interior, engine, transmission and features as the previous models. In 2003, the Chairman received a restyled front grille, front and rear headlights, and improved interior assembly.

The 2005 Chairman, based on the Mercedes-Benz E-Class (W124) had the following features: heated and cooled cup holders, rear parking sensors, rain-sensing wipers, anti-lock brakes, stability and traction control.

Although sold globally, the Chairman H sold very poorly outside Korea, due to both poor reviews and a lack of SsangYong dealerships. This was in part rectified by rebadging the car as a Daewoo in some countries, which also included the Daewoo corporate grille. The Daewoo version was offered until 2002 and was not replaced until 2005, when they introduced the Daewoo Statesman (a rebadged Holden).

In 2011, the Chairman H was once again redesigned, still keeping its Mercedes-Benz design cues.

The Korea Automobile Manufacturers Association (KAMA) stated that in 2014, SsangYong Motor Company sold a total of 1,718 Chairman H cars in South Korea. In January 2015, the SsangYong Motor Company website no longer advertised or referenced the Chairman H.

=== Engines ===
Model	Availability	Engine	Displacement	Power
2.3 I4 150	from debut	4-cylinder in-line petrol	2,299 cc	110 kW (150 PS; 148 hp)
2.8 I6 200	from debut	6-cylinder in-line petrol	2,799 cc	145 kW (197 PS; 194 hp)
3.2 I6 220	from debut	6-cylinder in-line petrol	3,199 cc	162 kW (220 PS; 217 hp)
3.6 I6 280	from 2007	6-cylinder in-line petrol	3,598 cc	206 kW (280 PS; 276 hp)

=== Gallery ===
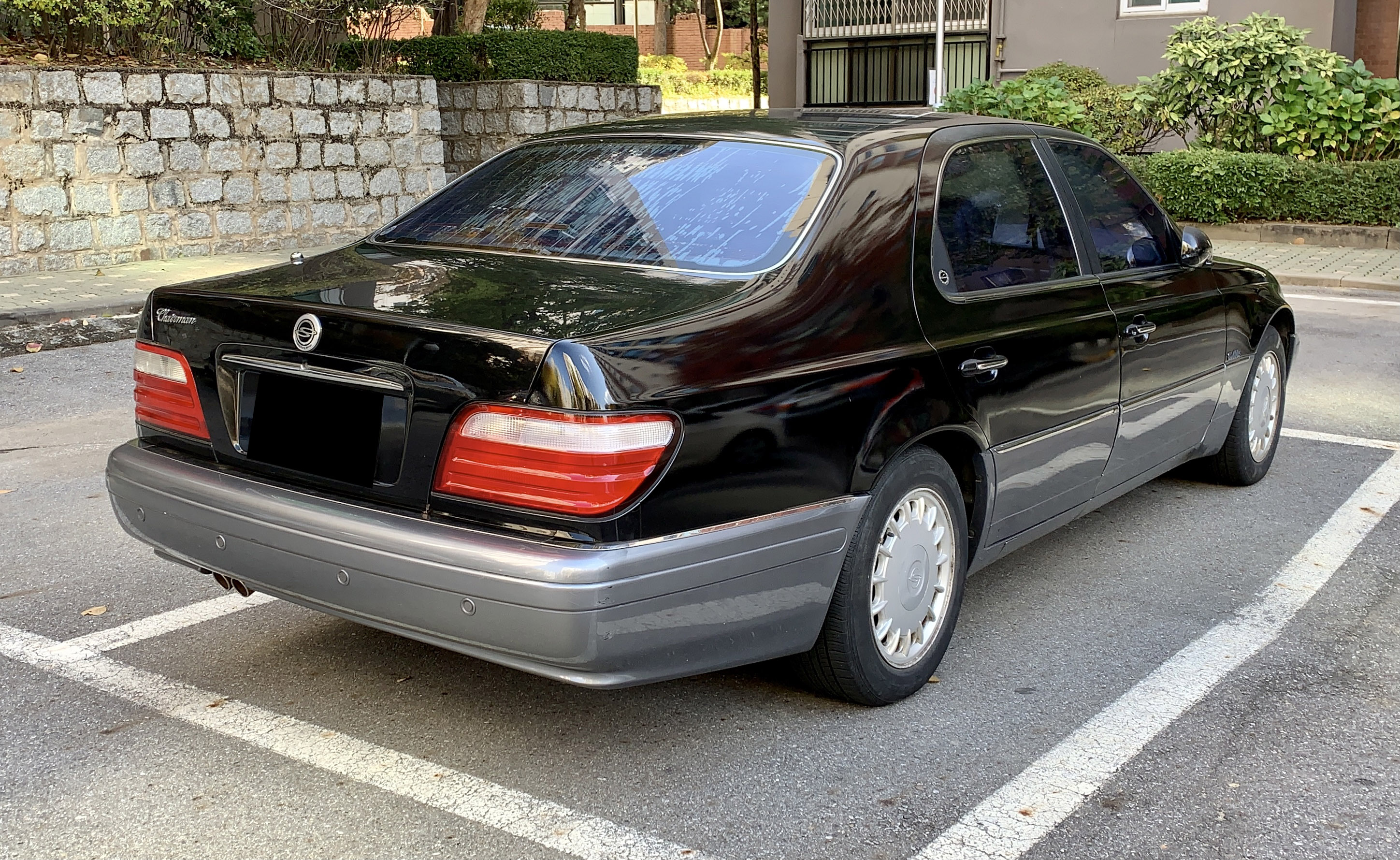
Chairman CM (1997–2004)

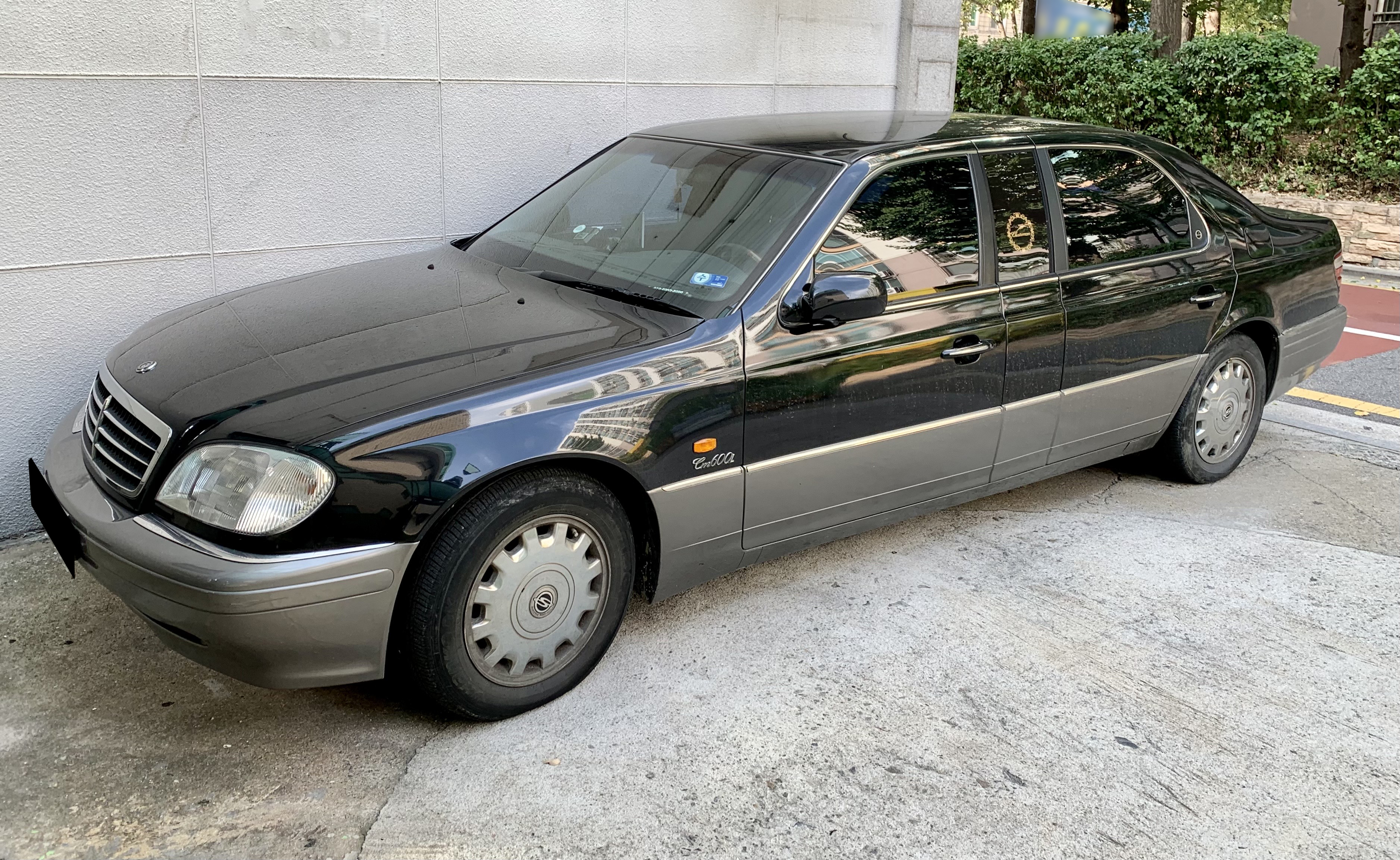
Chairman CM Limousine (1997–2004)

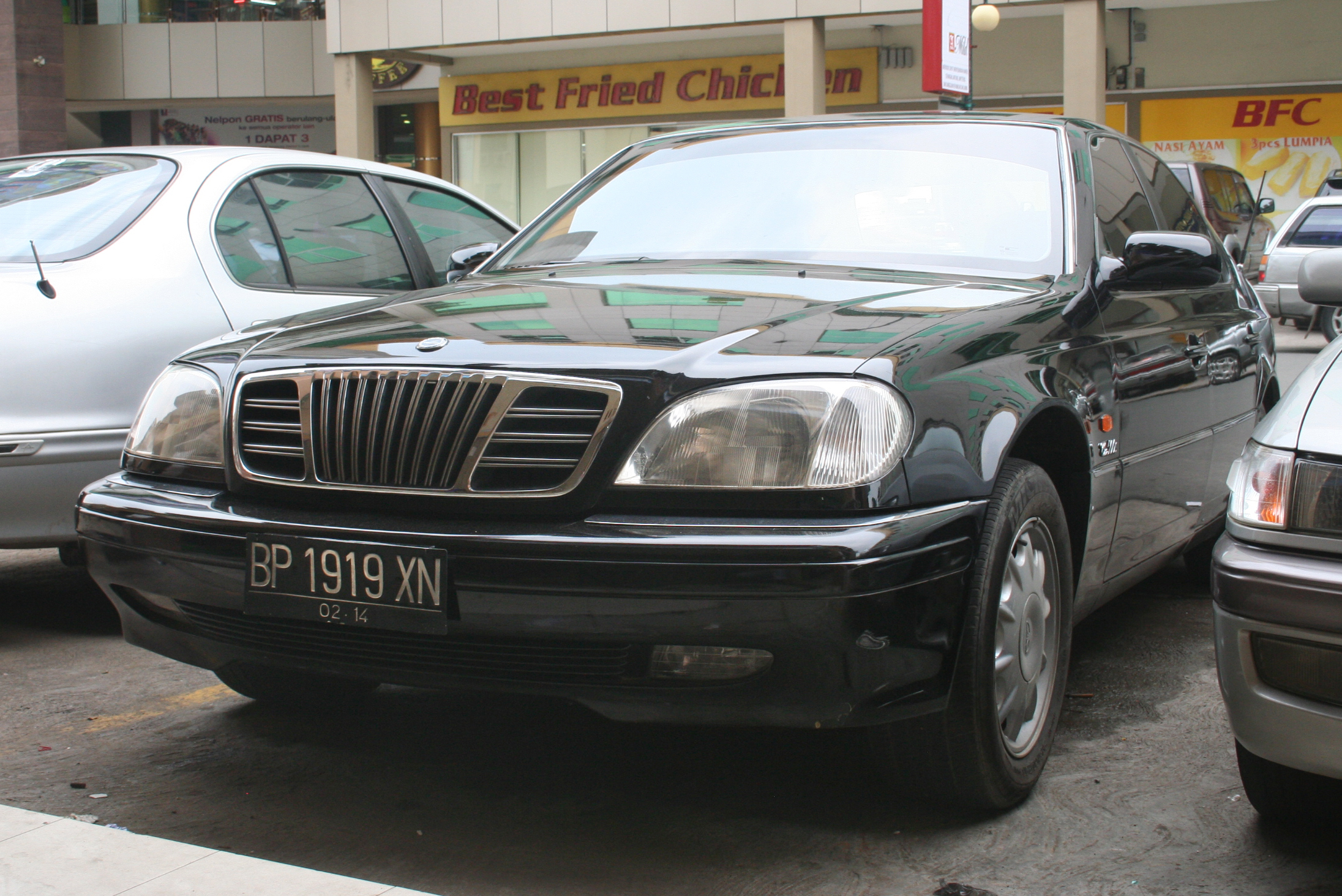
Daewoo Chairman
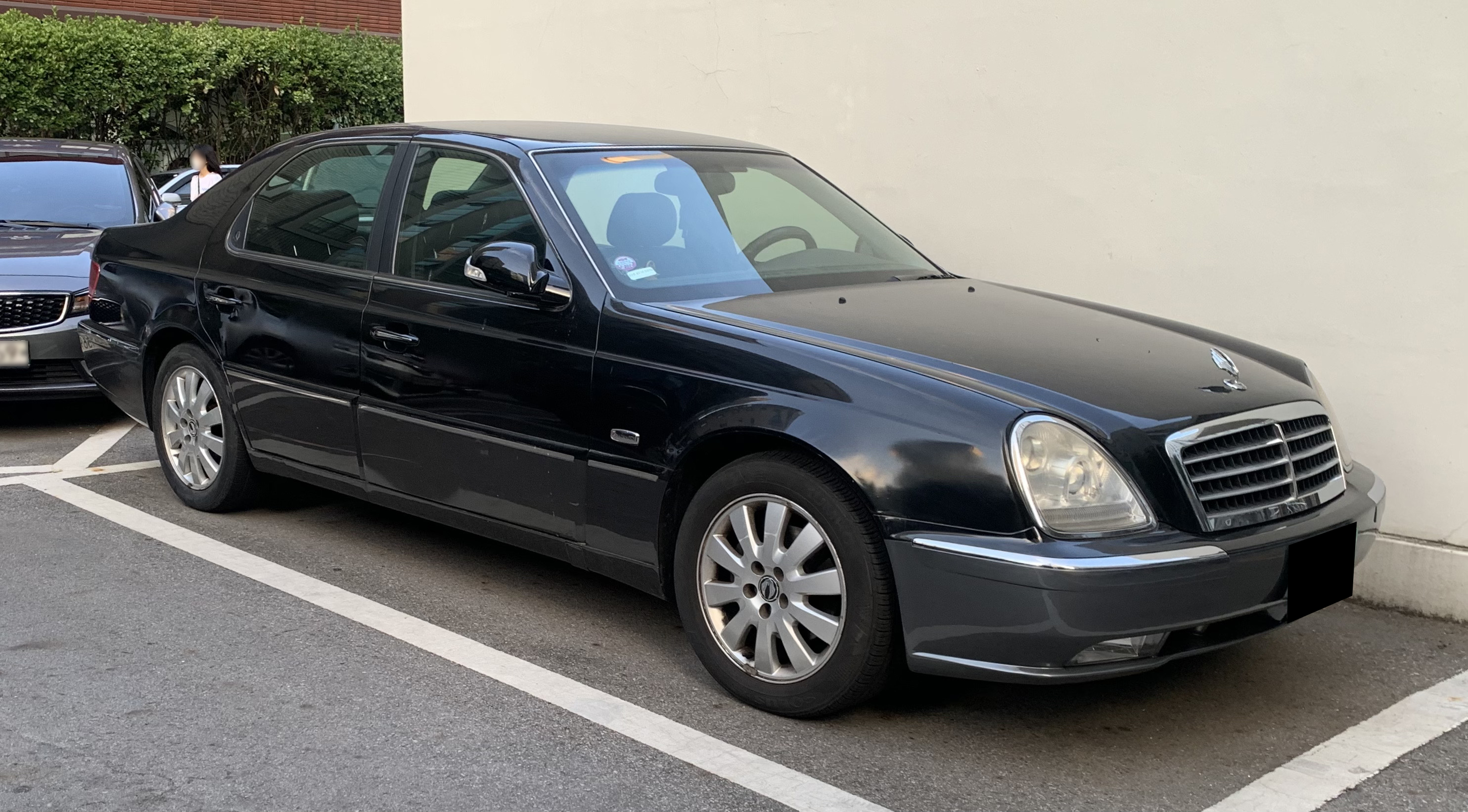
SsangYong Chairman H (2005–2011)

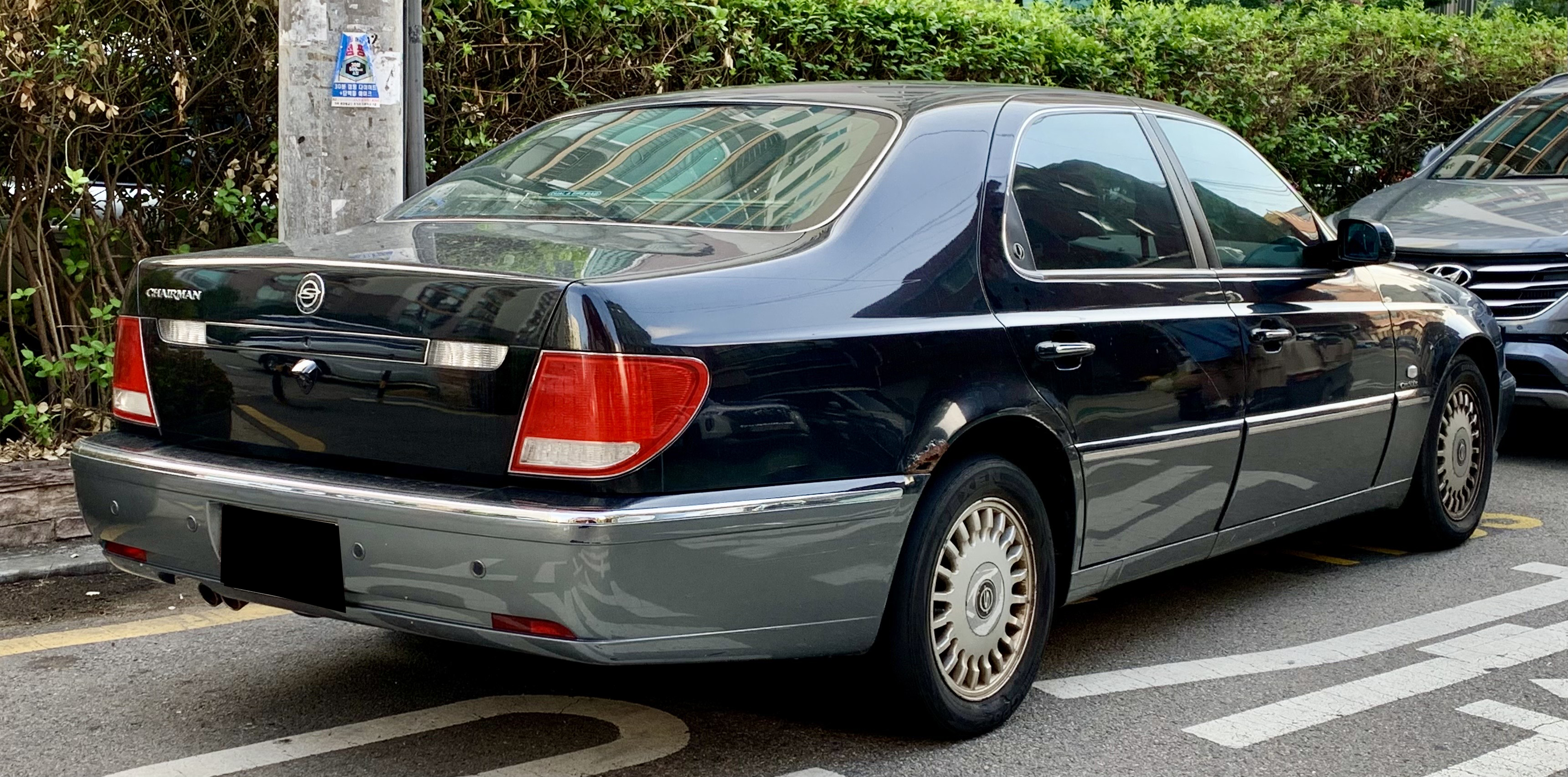
SsangYong Chairman H (2005–2011)

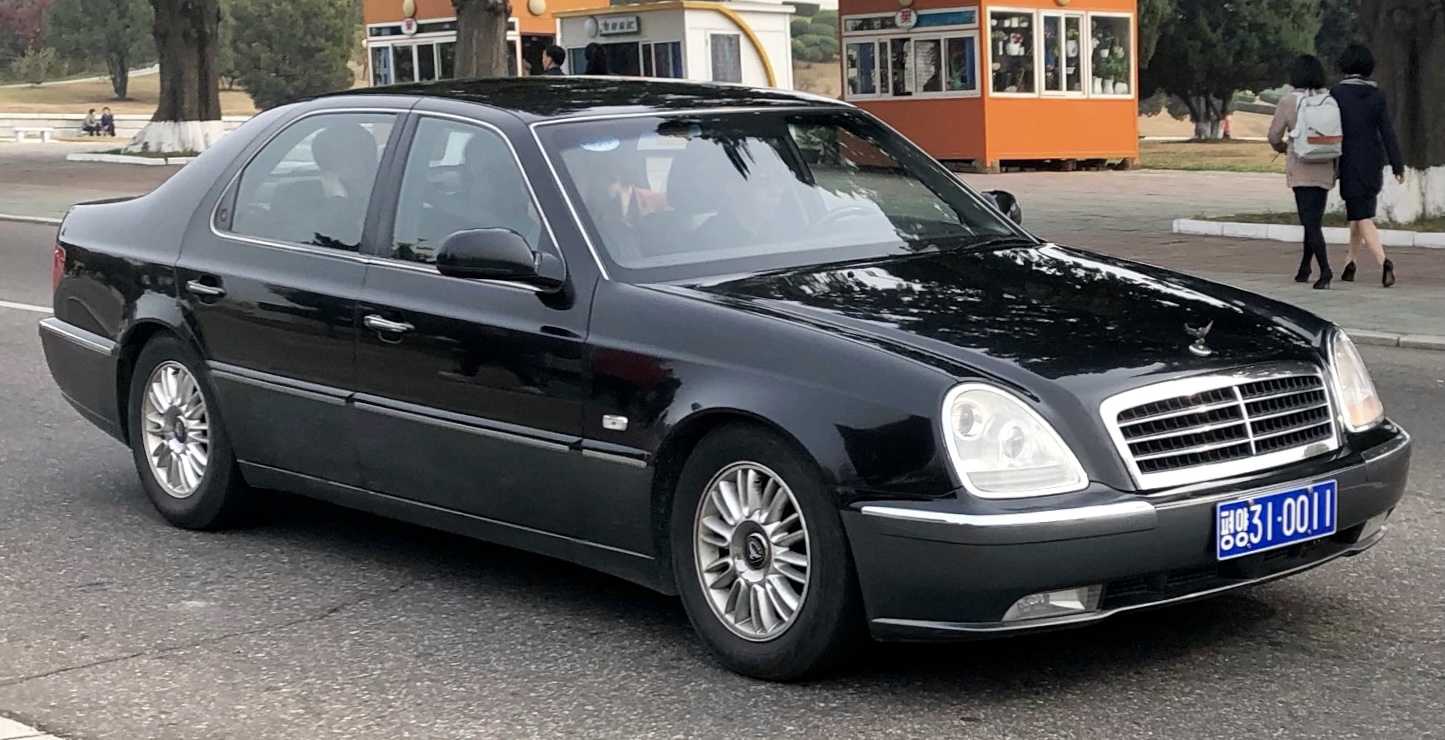
Pyeonghwa Junma (Zunma)
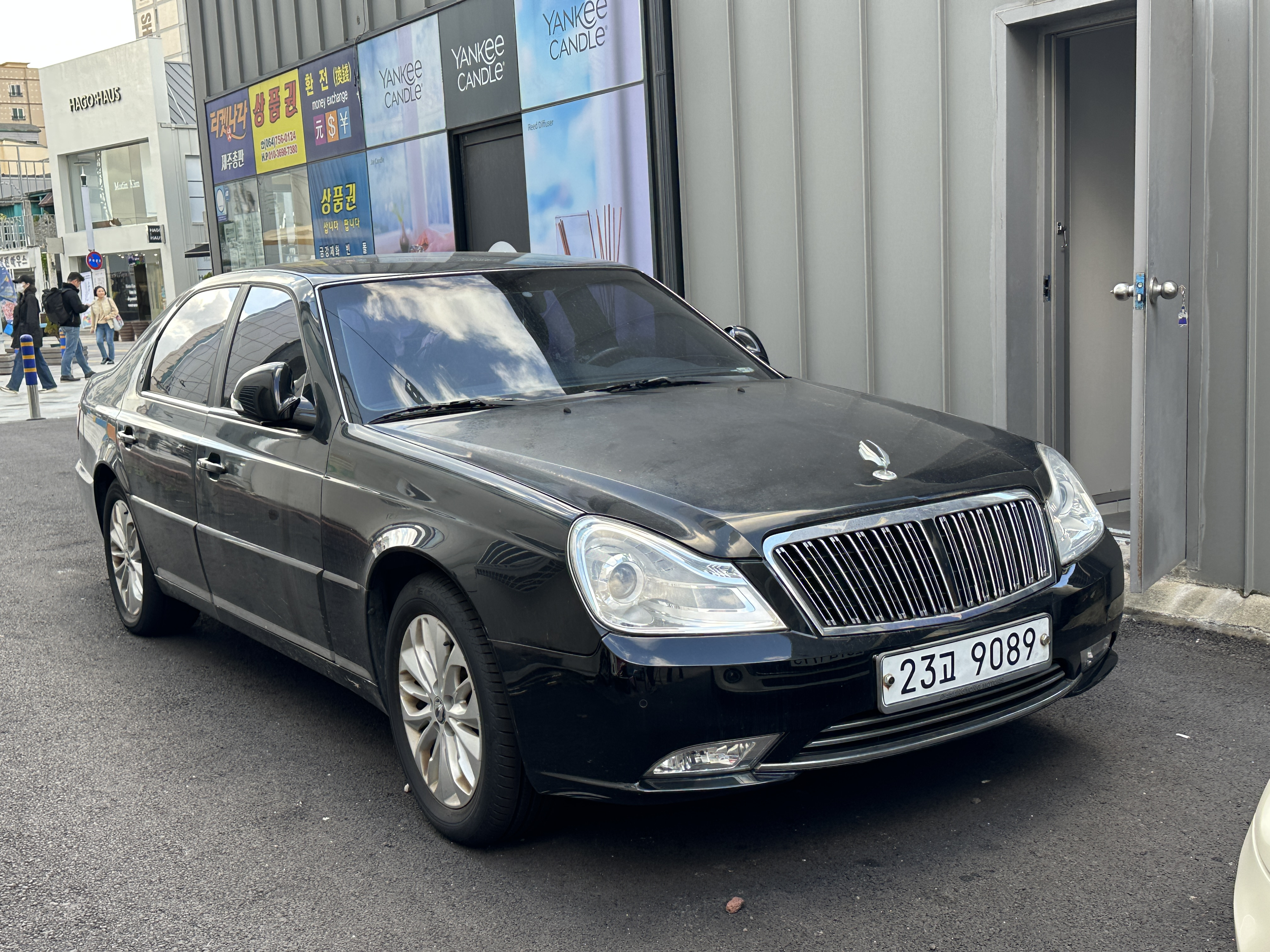
SsangYong Chairman H (2011-2014)

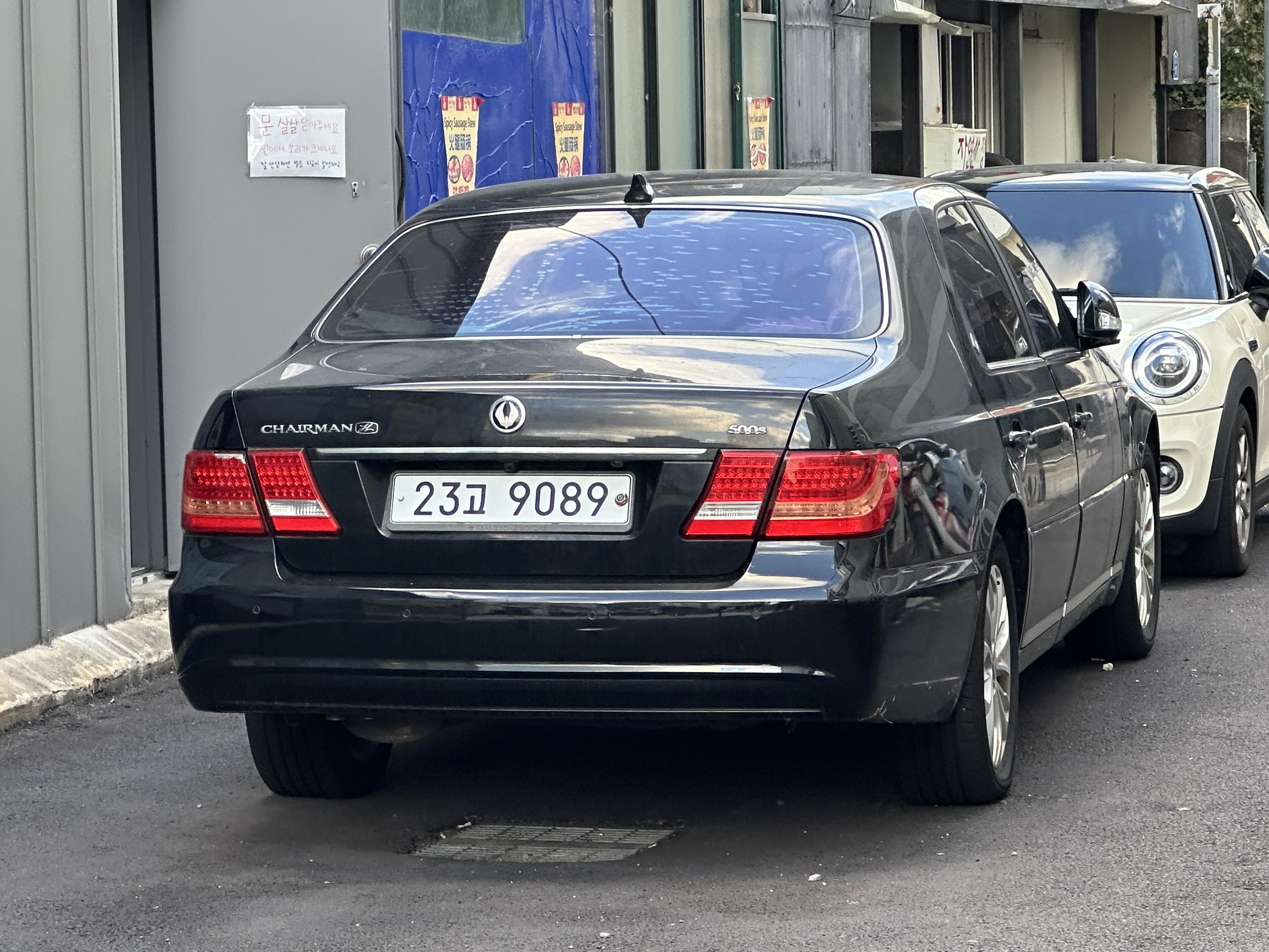
SsangYong Chairman H (2011-2014)

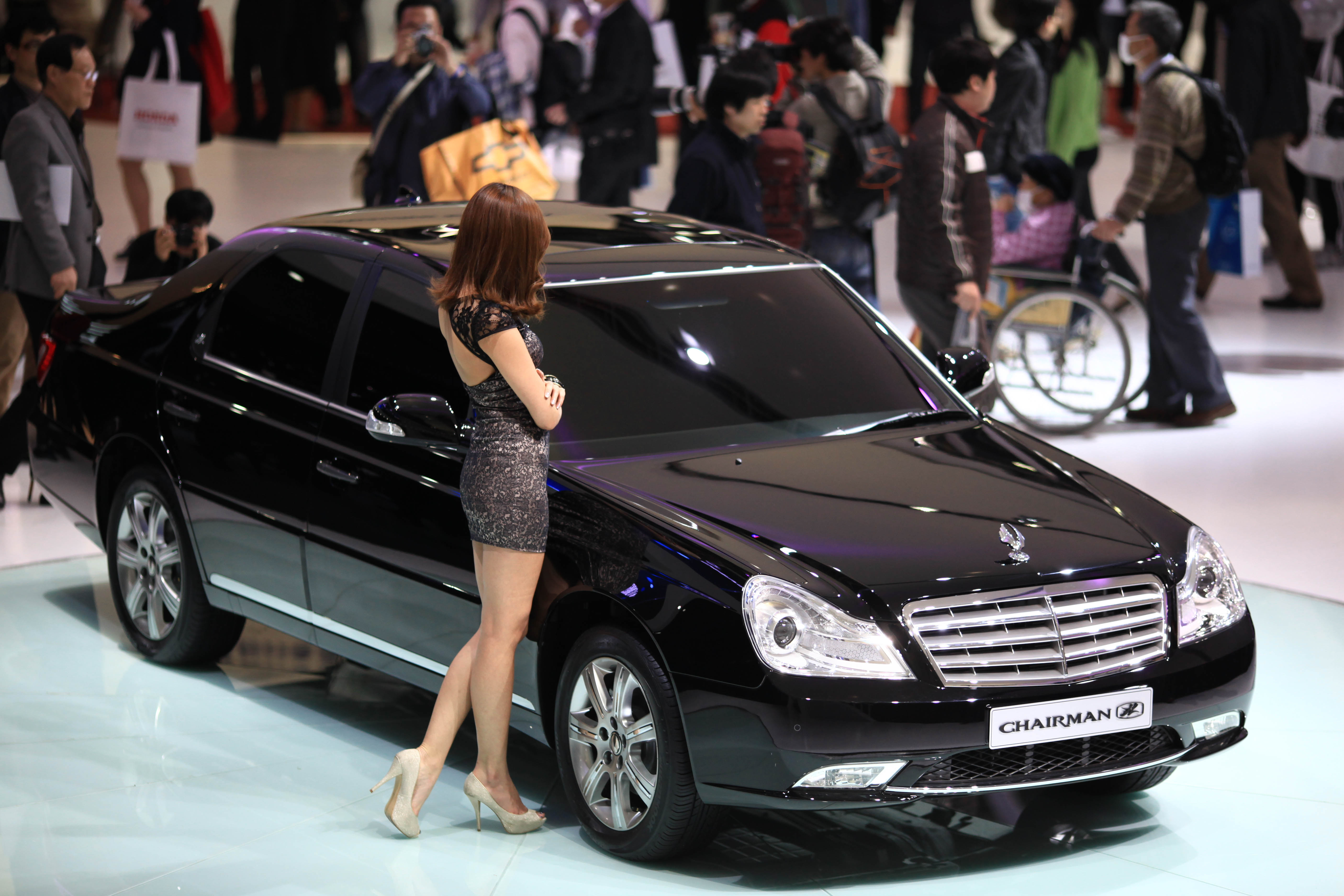
Redesigned Chairman H at the 2011 Seoul Motor Show

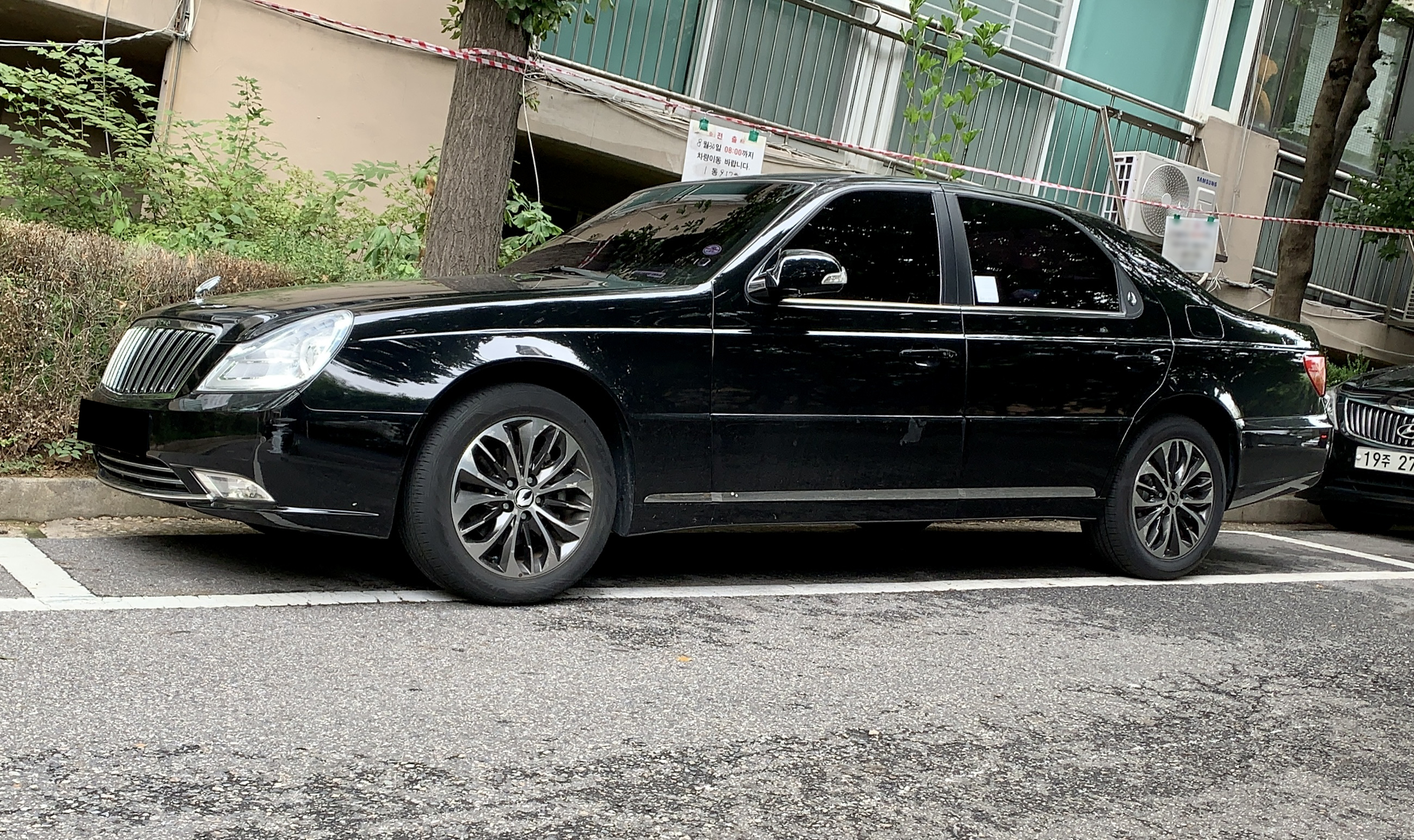
SsangYong Chairman H

== Second generation (Chairman W; 2008–2017) ==
Chairman W
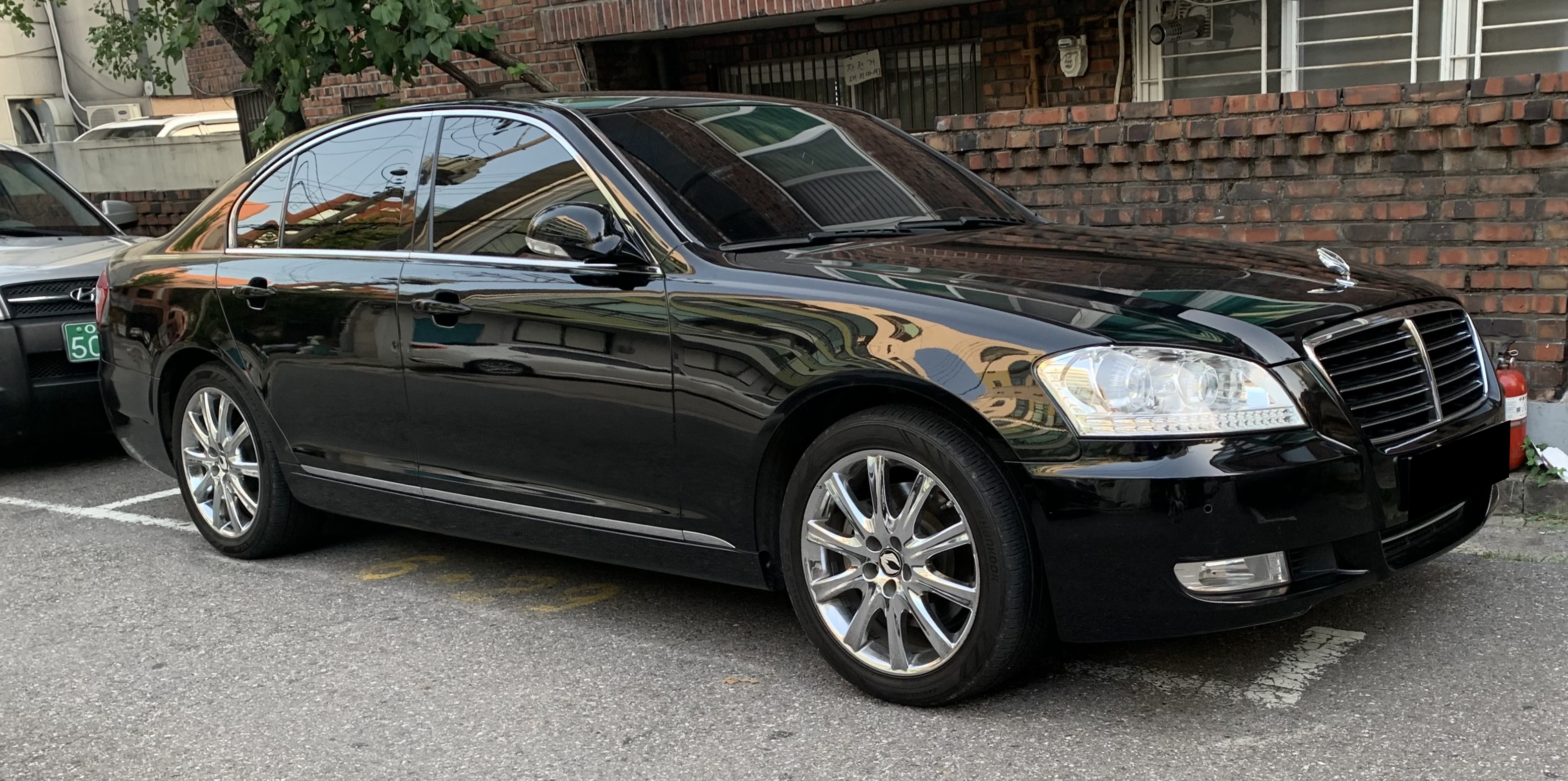

Overview
- Also called: Roewe R95 (cancelled)
- Production: 2008–2017
- Model years: 2008–2018

Body and chassis
- Layout: FR/F4 layout
- Related: Mercedes-Benz E-Class (W211)

Powertrain
- Engine: 3.2 L M104.99 I6; 3.6 L M104.941 I6; 5.0 L M113 E50 V8
- Transmission: 7-speed automatic (7G-Tronic)

Dimensions
- Wheelbase: 2,920 mm (115.0 in); 3,270 mm (128.7 in) (LWB)
- Length: 5,090 mm (200.4 in) (2008–2011); 5,135 mm (202.2 in) (2011–2017); 5,350 mm (210.6 in) (LWB)
- Width: 1,895 mm (74.6 in)
- Height: 1,495 mm (58.9 in); 1,500 mm (59.1 in) (LWB)

Chronology
- Successor: Roewe 950 (for Roewe R95)

SsangYong developed their own all-new flagship Chairman W, New Chairman with V8 5-litre engine and Mercedes-Benz 7G-Tronic automatic transmission. The Chairman W is derived from the SsangYong WZ concept car. The 'W' stands for 'World Class.'

Chairman W is offered in six trims with two engines, a limo version, and an additional AWD 4-Tronic (Mercedes-Benz 4Matic). XGi360, once used for New Chairman, is transferred to the entry model with a straight 6-cylinder engine, and the 5-liter V8 Mercedes-Benz M113 engine and the 7G-Tronic transmission (the largest V8 engine produced in South Korea) are applied to two high-end models, VVIP and the long-wheel-base version. It has an electronically controlled self-levelling air suspension system with a rebound coil that helps reduce noise and vibration, as well as an extended rear passenger space and the front and rear both have their own screen to control the car's entertainment system, similar to Chrysler's MyGig.

The Chairman W is the first Korean luxury sedan to apply a four-wheel drive system, a feature common in high-end European sedans.

The Chairman W was planned to be rebadged as the Roewe R95 for the short-wheel-base version, and the Roewe R95L for the long-wheel-base version, to serve as Roewe's flagship model, but the project was canceled. Roewe would later add a full-size flagship sedan to their lineup in the Roewe 950, which was initially planned to be named the R95.

On 23 November 2017, SsangYong Motor Company announced that the Chairman will be finally discontinued in order to shift focus on SUVs and crossovers, marking the end of Chairman production after just over twenty years.

=== Engines ===
Model	Name	Motor	Displacement	Power	Torque	Consumption	Top speed
3.2 I6	XGi320	6-cylinder in-line, petrol	3,199 cc	165.5 kW (225 PS; 222 hp) at 6,600 rpm	296 N⋅m (218 lb⋅ft) at 4,600 rpm	8.1 km/L	250 km/h (155 mph)
3.6 I6	XGi360	6-cylinder in-line, petrol	3,598 cc	184 kW (250 PS; 247 hp) at 6,600 rpm	343 N⋅m (253 lb⋅ft) at 4,000 rpm	7.8 km/L	250 km/h (155 mph)
5.0 V8	XGi500	8-cylinder in V, petrol	4,966 cc	225 kW (306 PS; 302 hp) at 5,600 rpm	441 N⋅m (325 lb⋅ft) at 4,000 rpm	7.3 km/L	250 km/h (155 mph)

=== Gallery ===
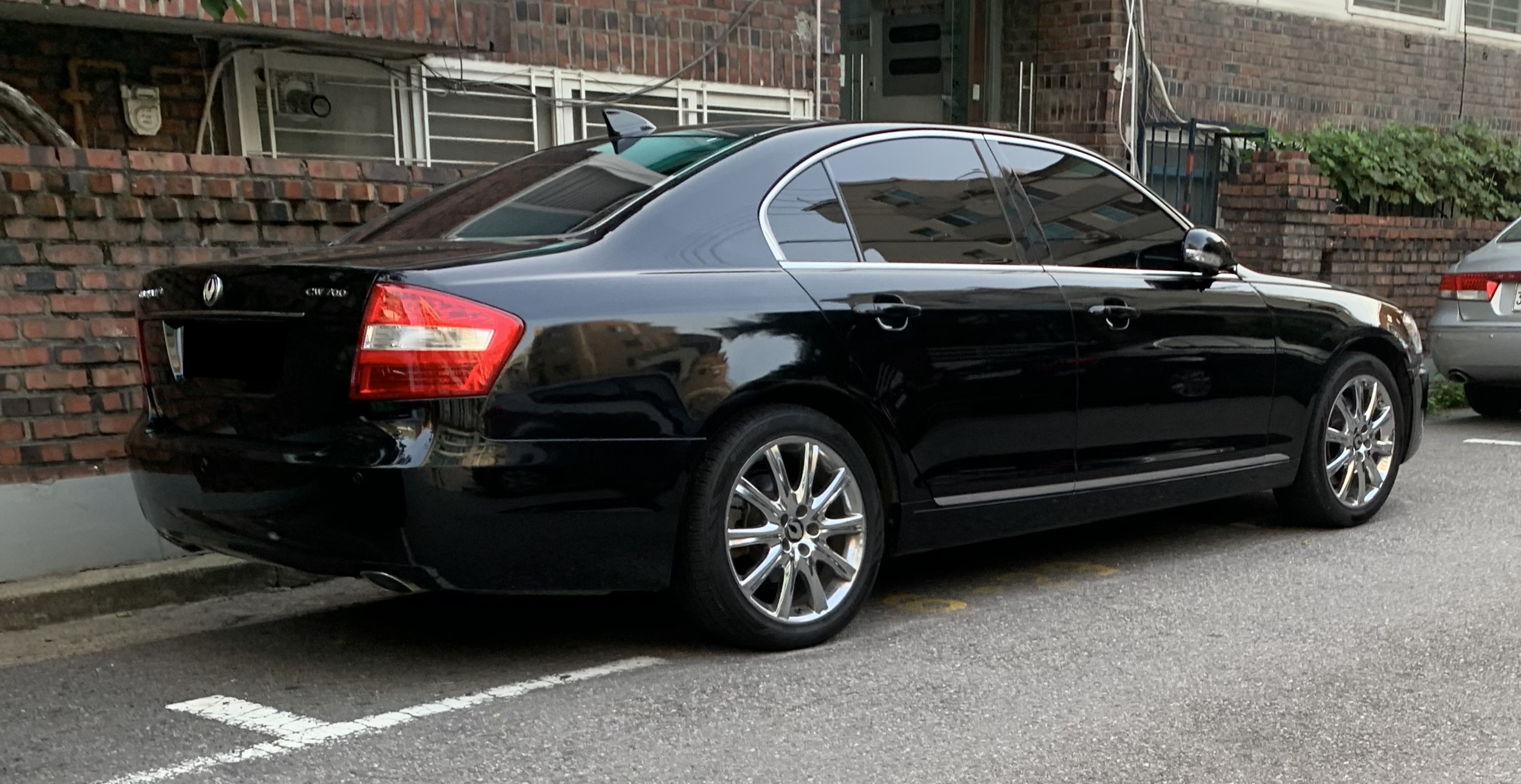
Chairman W CW700 (2011–2013)

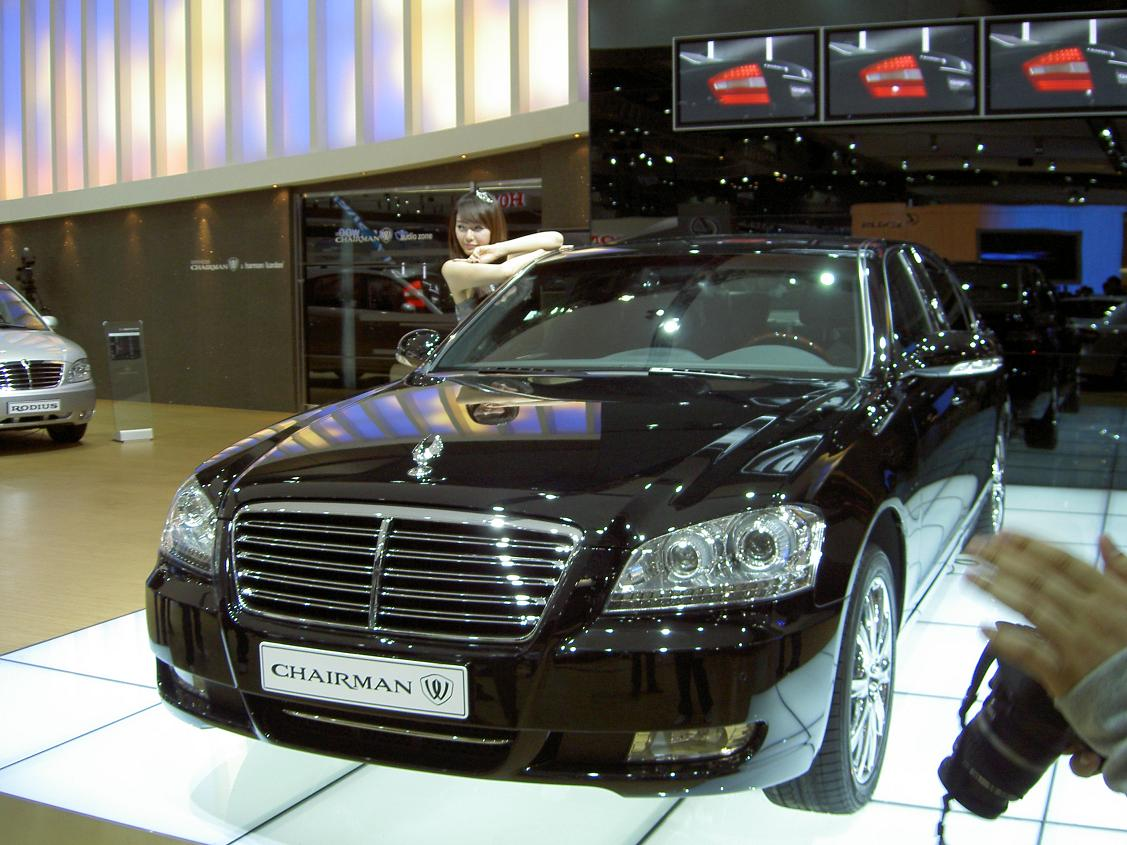
SsangYong Chairman W

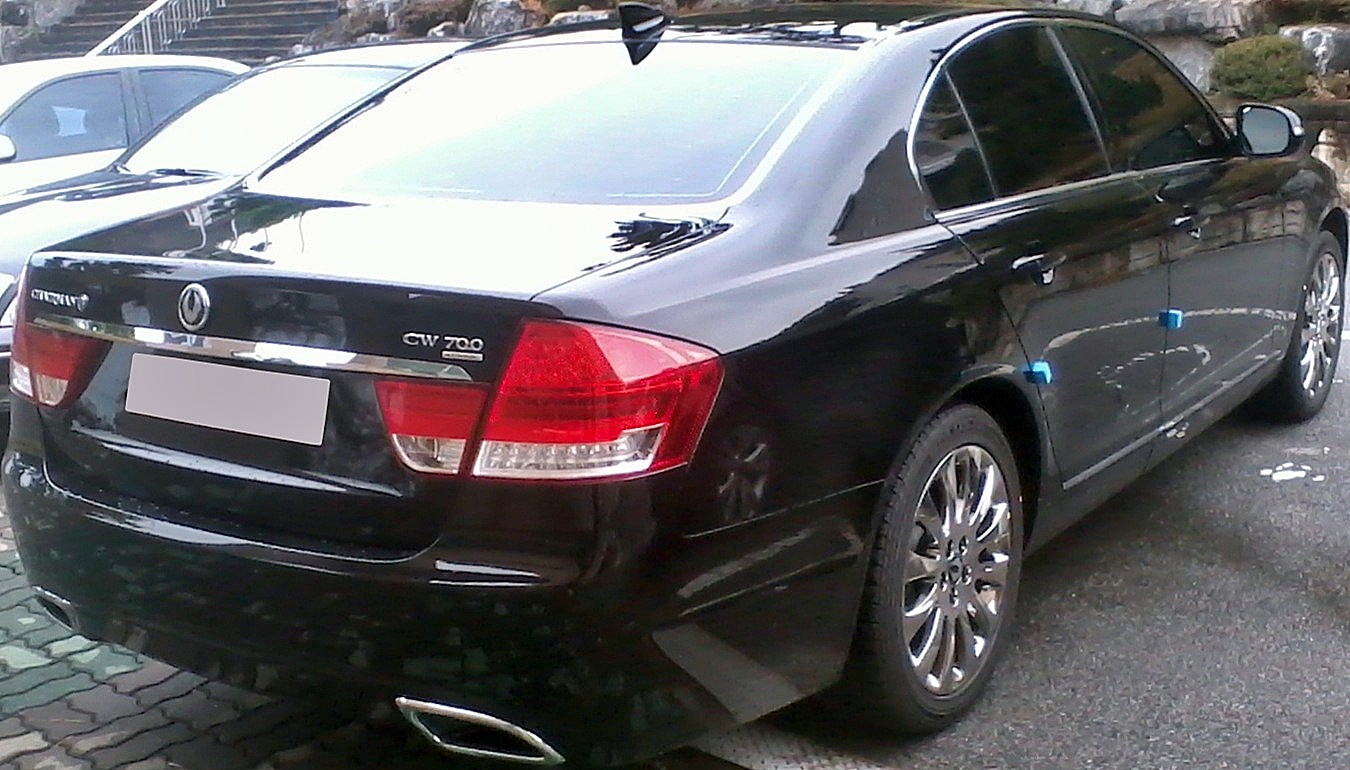
Redesigned Chairman W CW700 (2013)
