= Unimog =

Range of tractors and lorries made by Daimler AG

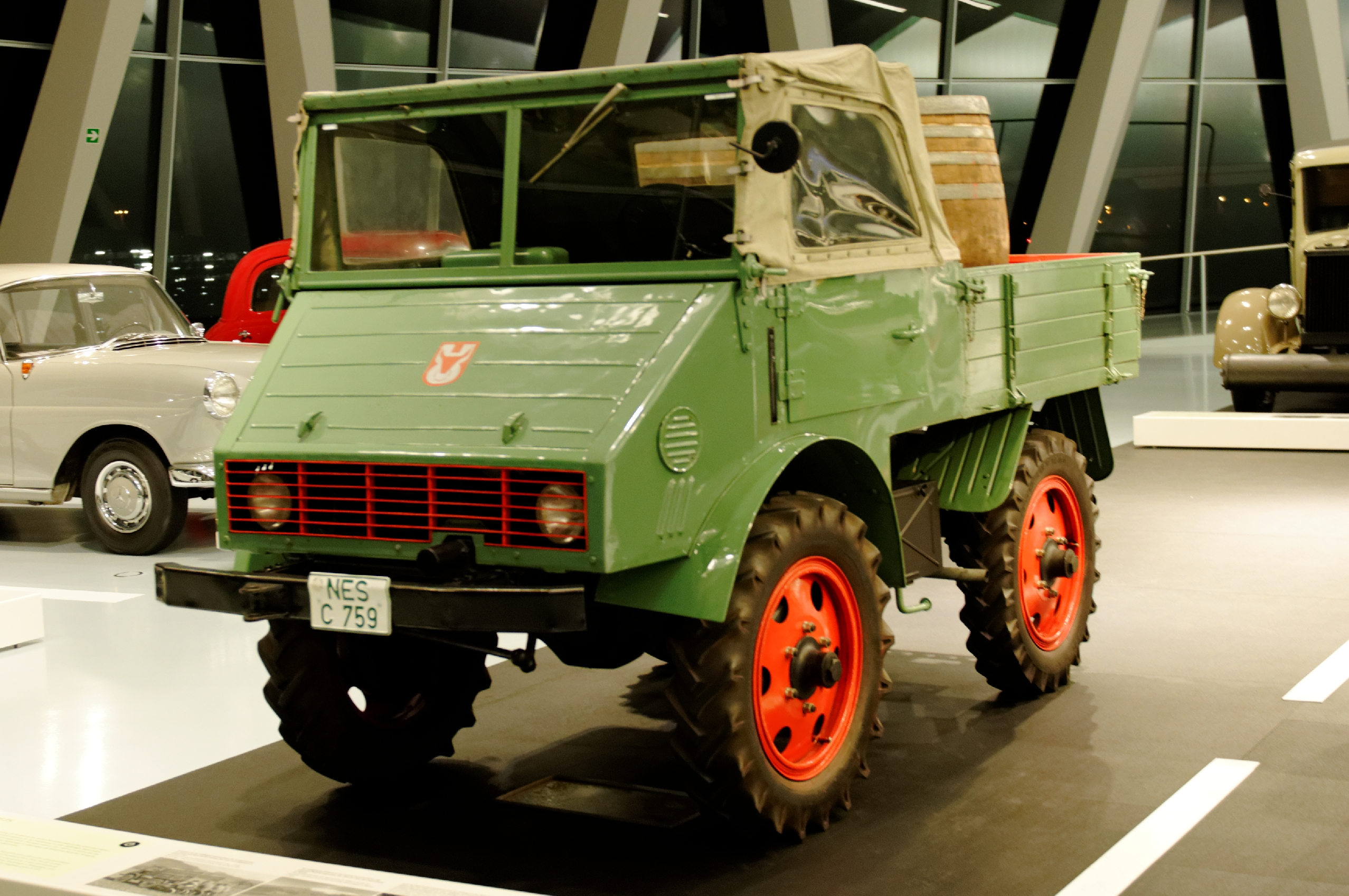
1948 Boehringer Unimog 70200

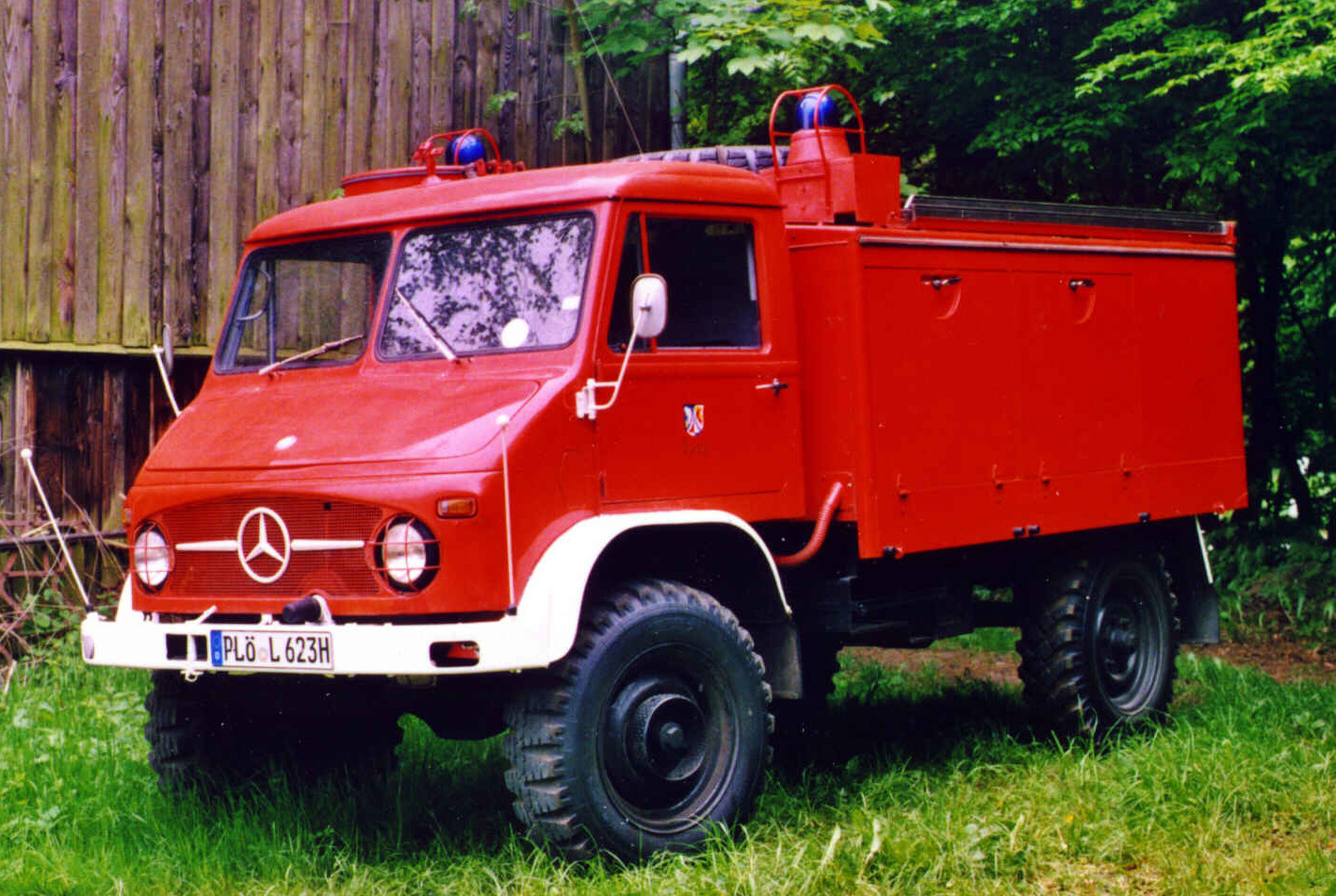
1960s Unimog 404 fire engine TLF 8/8. The 404S was mainly used for military duty

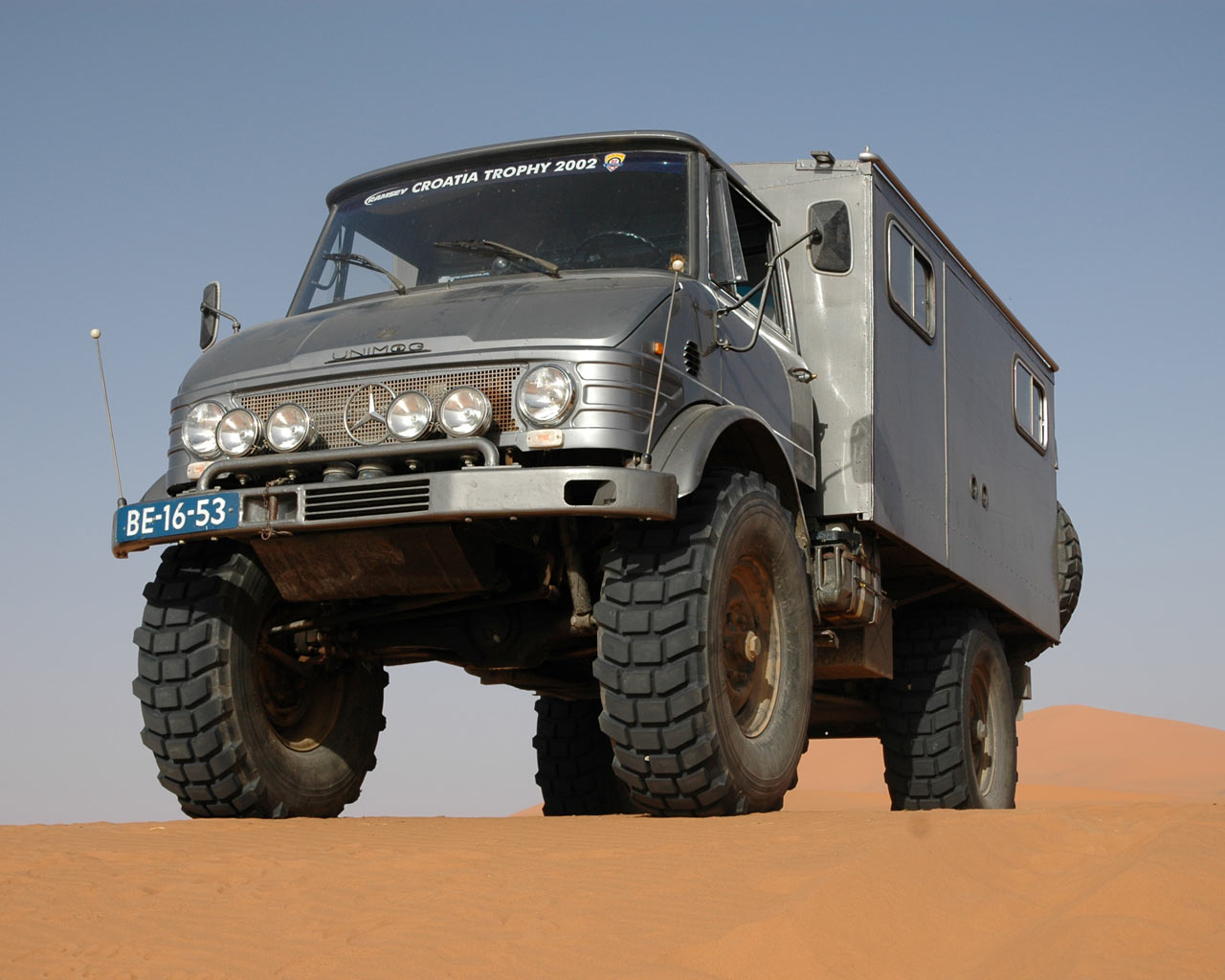
1970s Unimog 406 with large ground clearance due to its portal axles

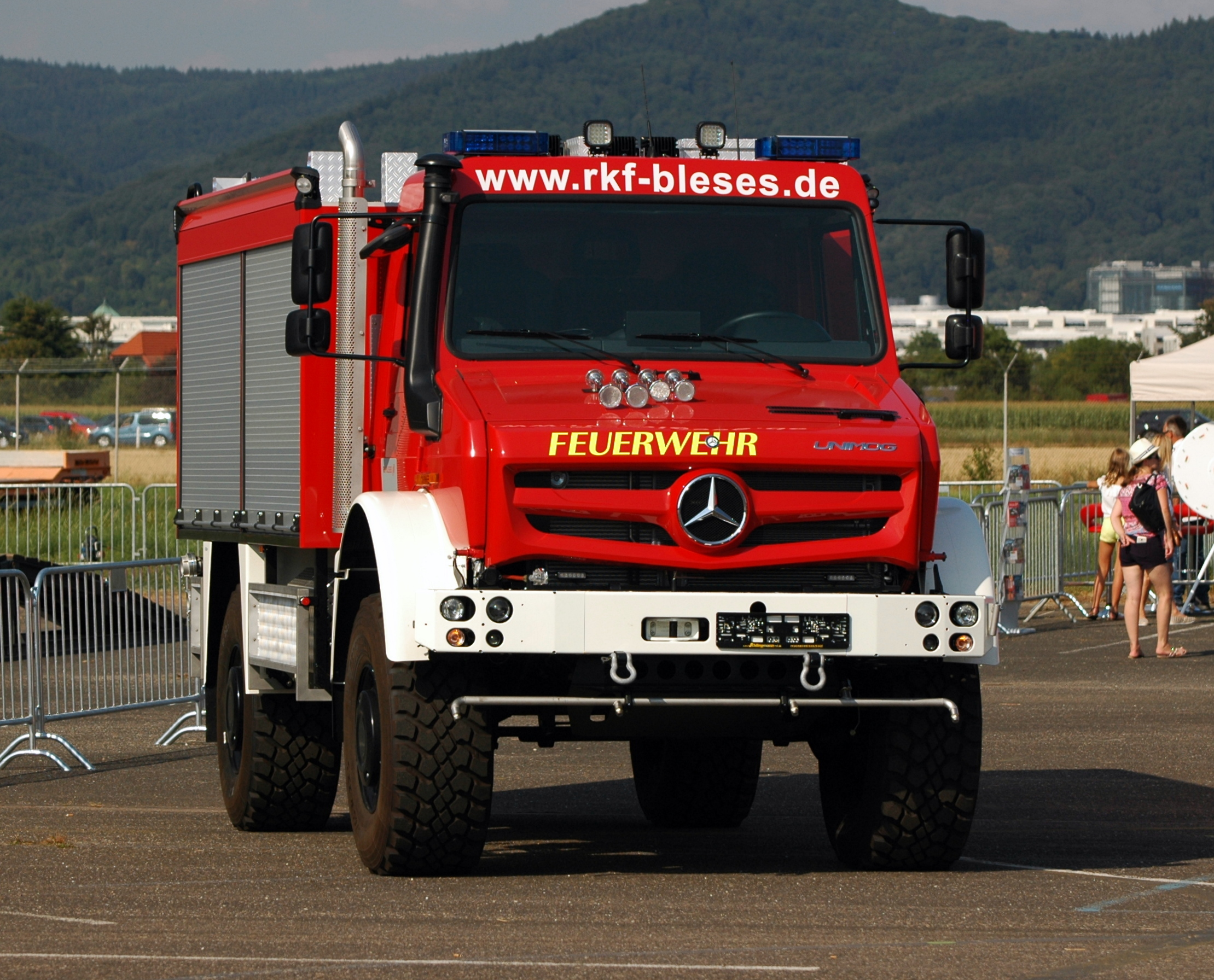
2018 Unimog 437.4 Firefighter

The Unimog (English: /ˈjuːnɪmɒɡ/; German: [ˈʊnɪmɔk] []) is a Daimler Truck line of multi-purpose, highly off-road-capable AWD vehicles produced since 1948. Utilizing engine-driven power take-offs (PTOs), Unimogs have operated in the roles of tractors, light trucks and lorries, for snow plowing, in agriculture, forestry, rural firefighting, in the military, and even in rallying and as recreational vehicles.

== Overview ==
Conceived in 1944 in response to the Morgenthau Plan, former Daimler-Benz airplane engine engineers developed prototypes under occupation. The small universally-applicable motorised 25hp workhorse was designed to be able to fit over two rows of potatoes to work on fields like a slow agricultural tractor, but with four equal size wheels on portal axles, coil spring suspension, and many gears allowing it to run on roads like a truck. Unimog production started in 1948 at Boehringer in Göppingen. When larger production numbers were needed, Daimler-Benz took over manufacture of the Unimog in 1951, and first produced it in their Gaggenau plant, and the Unimog was sold under the Mercedes-Benz brand. However, the first Unimog to feature the three-pointed Mercedes-Benz star instead of the Boehringer bullhead was only introduced in 1953. From 1973, the more tractor-like sister product MB-trac was offered by Daimler-Benz before its production was discontinued in 1991.

Since 2002, the Unimog has been built in the Mercedes-Benz truck plant in Wörth am Rhein in Germany. The Mercedes-Benz Türk A.Ş. plant assembles Unimogs in Aksaray, Turkey. Unimogs were also built in Argentina (the first country to do so outside Germany) by Mercedes-Benz Argentina S.A., under licence, from 1968 to 1983 (with some extra units built from parts in stock up until 1991) in the González Catán factory near the city of Buenos Aires.

The first model was designed by Albert Friedrich and Heinrich Rößler shortly after World War II, to be used in agriculture as a self-propelled machine providing a power take-off with which to operate saws in forests or harvesting machines on fields. It was designed with rear-wheel drive and switchable front-wheel drive, with equal-size wheels, in order to be driven on roads at higher speeds than standard farm tractors. With their very high ground clearance and a flexible frame that is essentially a part of the suspension, Unimogs are not designed to carry as much load as regular trucks.

Due to their off-road capabilities, Unimogs can be found in jungles, mountains and deserts as military vehicles, fire fighters, expedition campers, and even in competitions like truck trials and Dakar Rally rally raids. In Western Europe, they are commonly used as snowploughs, municipal equipment carriers, agricultural implements, forest ranger vehicles, construction equipment or road–rail vehicles and as army personnel or equipment carriers (in its armoured military version). New Unimogs can be purchased in one of two series: the medium-series 405, also known as the UGN (Geräteträger, or "equipment carrier"), or the heavy-series 437, also known as the UHN (Hochgeländegängig, or "highly mobile cross-country").

== Etymology ==
The name Unimog is an abbreviation of the German "Universal-Motor-Gerät", Gerät being the German word for a piece of equipment (also in the sense of device, machine, instrument, gear, apparatus). It was created by German engineer Hans Zabel, who made the note Universal-Motor-Gerät on a technical drawing. Later, this was abbreviated to Unimog. The shortened name was officially unveiled on 20 November 1946. Since 1952, Unimog has been a brand of Daimler Truck.

== Features ==
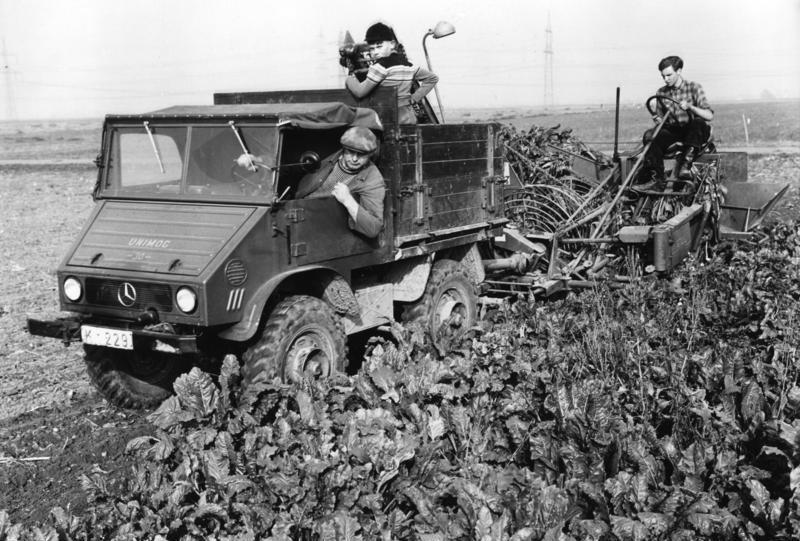
Unimog 411 with beet lifter, 1957

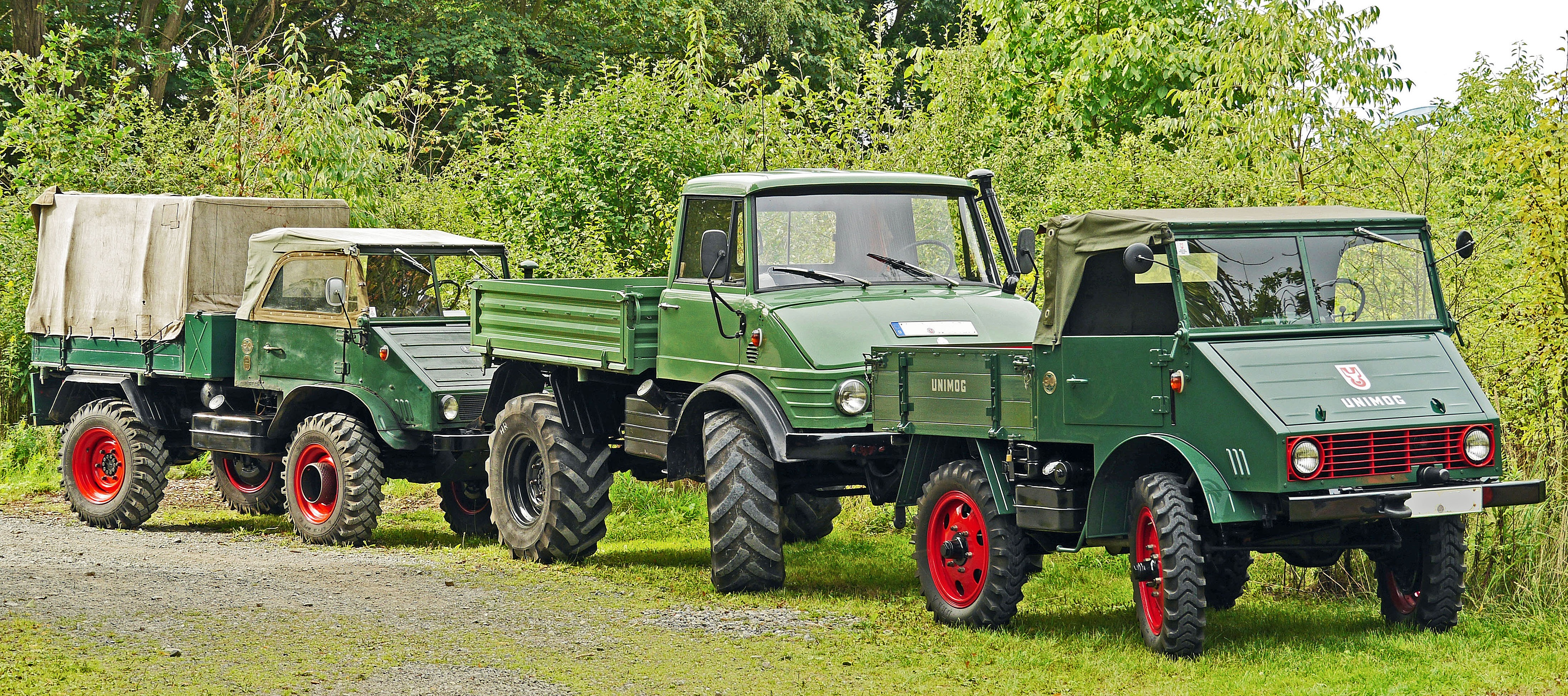
Unimog 401, 406 and 411

=== Design ===
The Unimog's characteristic design element is its chassis: a flexible ladder frame with short overhangs, and coil sprung beam portal axles with a central torque tube and transverse links. Having portal axles, the wheels' centres are below the axle centre, which gives the Unimog a high ground clearance without the need for big tyres. The coil sprung axles with torque tubes allow an axle angle offset of up to 30°, giving the wheels a wide range of vertical movement to allow the truck to drive over extremely uneven terrain, even boulders of one metre in height.

Unimogs are equipped with high-visibility cabs to maximize operator visibility of terrain and when manipulating powered tools. The newest implement carrier Unimog models can be changed from left-hand drive to right-hand drive in the field to permit operators to work on the more convenient side of the truck. The ability to operate on highways enables the Unimog to be returned to a secure garage or yard at the end of a shift.

=== Equipment ===
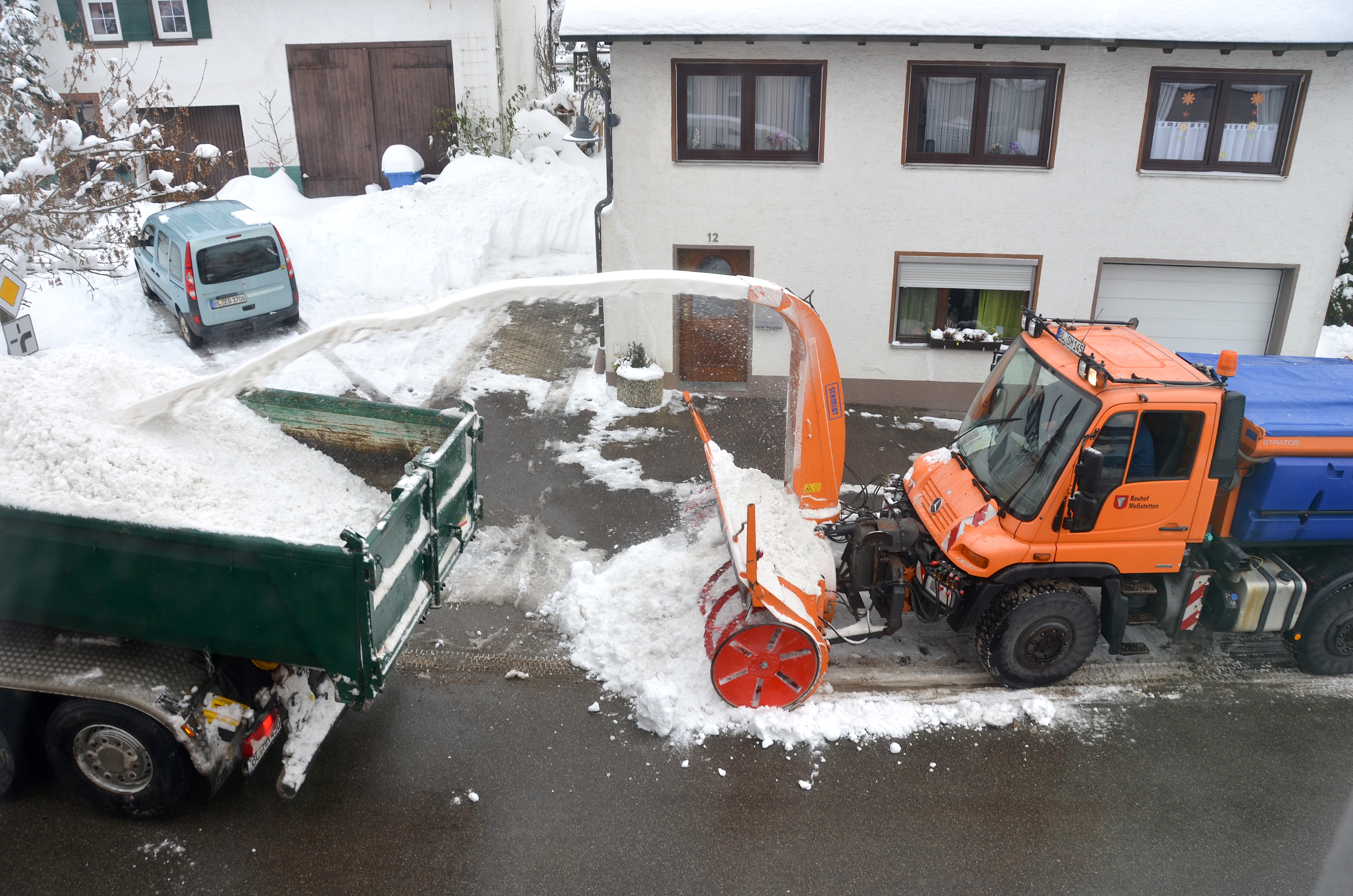
Unimog equipped with a snow blower

Unimogs can be equipped with front and rear tool mounting brackets and hydraulic connections to allow bucket loaders and hydraulic arms to be used. Most units have a power take-off (PTO) connection to operate rotary equipment such as snow brooms, snow blowers, brush mowers, loaders or stationary conveyor belts.

=== Variants ===
Unimogs are available with short wheelbases for implement carrier operations or long wheelbases for all-terrain cargo carrying operations. Currently (2022), Daimler Trucks offers the 437.4 heavy series and the 405 implement carrier series. Starting in 1951 having purchased the traditional Unimog from Boehringer, Daimler-Benz started making the Unimog S series in the mid-1950s and added light, medium and heavy series to the model lineup in the 1960s and 1970s, before they successively reduced the available models during the 1990s to end up with the modern implement carrier and the heavy series today.

Originally, the traditional Unimog 70200 was a rather small agricultural tractor, measuring just 3520 mm in length. It was only offered as a Cabrio with a canvas roof. The engine power output of 25 PS (18 kW) proved to be insufficient for many applications. To accommodate customer needs, a longer wheelbase version, a proper cab and more powerful engines (up to 34 PS (25 kW)) were introduced soon after Daimler-Benz took over Unimog manufacture; the traditional Unimog evolved into its final stage, the 411-series. Yet, Daimler-Benz decided that an entirely new, more powerful version of the Unimog would be required to meet future customer expectations. This Unimog version would later be known as 406-series.

The military Unimog S series is the first Unimog designed to be an offroad truck rather than a tractor, and it is the only series production Unimog that has an Otto engine. (Note: In this article, the terms Otto cycle engine and Diesel cycle engine are used to differentiate between a traditional petrol engine and a traditional Diesel engine. This is because the original Unimog does not only have a Diesel engine that can burn petrol (precombustion chamber design), but also used to require petrol as a fuel additive in winter to prevent the fuel from gelling. Furthermore, many German military vehicles (such as the Unimog S) have petrol engines, but several military petrol engines use the Diesel principle.) Daimler-Benz designed a new frame for it, but it still shares its drivetrain with the 411-series.

With the introduction of the 406-series in 1962, Daimler-Benz laid the foundation for a completely new Unimog model family, the 406-based medium series (in the 1960s known as heavy series). It was produced until 1994. Unimogs belonging to the medium series are the series 403, 413, 406, 416, 426, and 419. These models were offered with three different wheelbases (2380 mm, 2900 mm, 3400 mm) and two engines, the straight-four and straight-six direct injected Diesel engines OM 314 and OM 352, ranging from 54 to 110 PS (40–81 kW). The light series 421 and 431 share their frame design with the 411-series, but borrow their drivetrain and cab design from the 406-series, which is why they also count as 406-related Unimogs.

The heavy series Unimogs were introduced in 1974, and first featured the edgy cab, which is still a design feature of the Unimog today. The first heavy series Unimog was the 425-series, which was available from 1976. (Note: Mercedes-Benz presented the 425 in 1974, and the 435 in 1975. Series production started in January 1976.) Soon after, the 435-series and 424-series followed, which caused a decline in Unimog 406 sales.The 425 was available with a wheelbase of 2810 mm, the 424 with 2650 mm and 3250 mm, and the 435 with 3250 mm, 3700 mm and 3850 mm. The introduction of new engines starting in 1986 caused a shift in the series numbers, but leaving the vehicles mostly unchanged otherwise. The 424 became 427 and both 425 and 435 were joined together and became 437. A derivative of the 437-series, the 437.4-series is still in production today.

In 1988, after declining Unimog sales, Daimler-Benz launched a new strategy that was supposed to increase sales and make the Unimog more profitable, called "Unimog-Programm 1988". New models introduced with this programme were the new light series 407 and medium series 417, which ought to replace all Unimog 406-related series. 407- and 417-series were replaced after just four years, in 1992, with the 408- and 418-series. in 2000, these two models were replaced with the current 405 implement carrier series, making the 437.4 and the 405 the only remaining Unimog series.

== Technical description ==
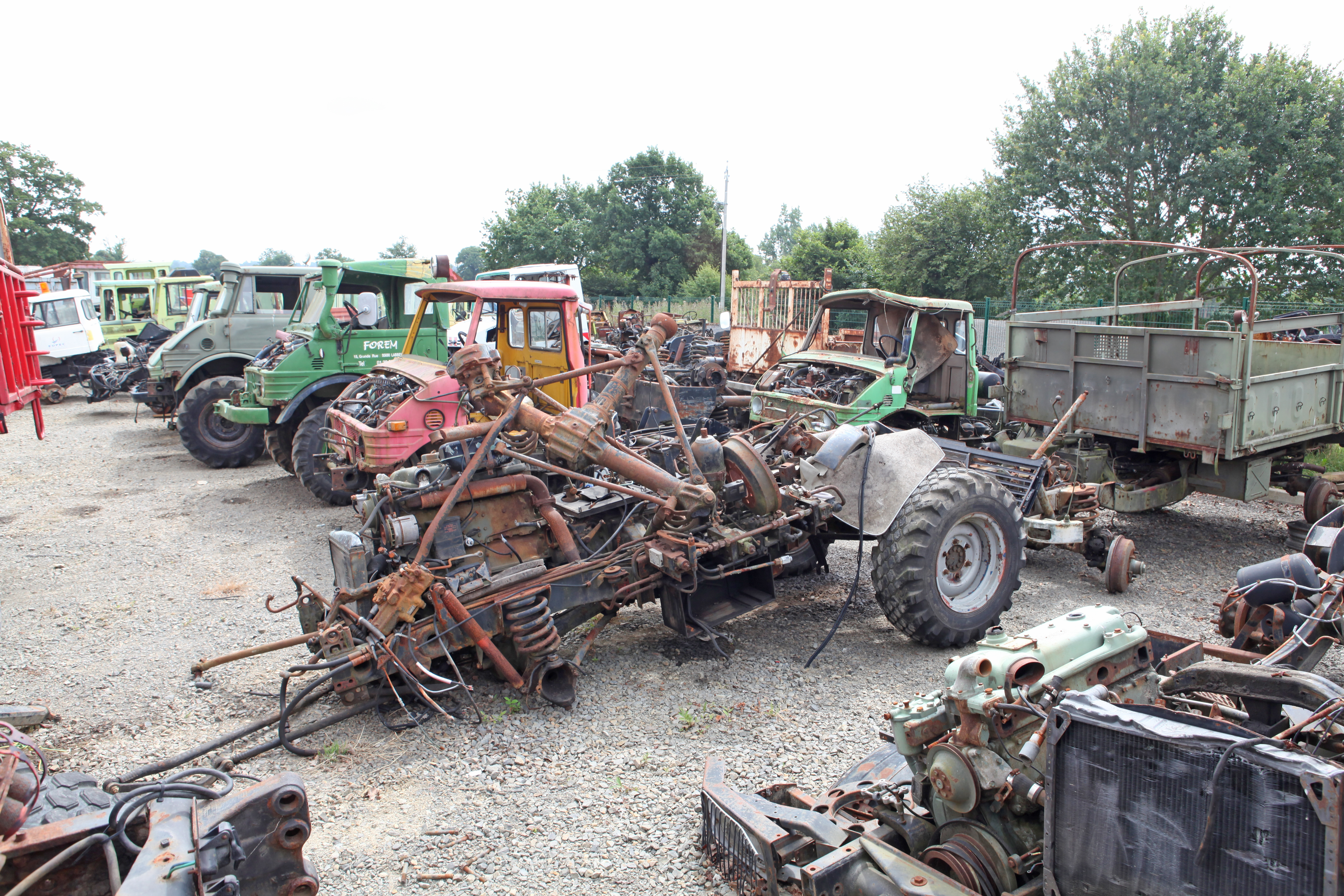
Scrapped Unimog 411 with plane frame

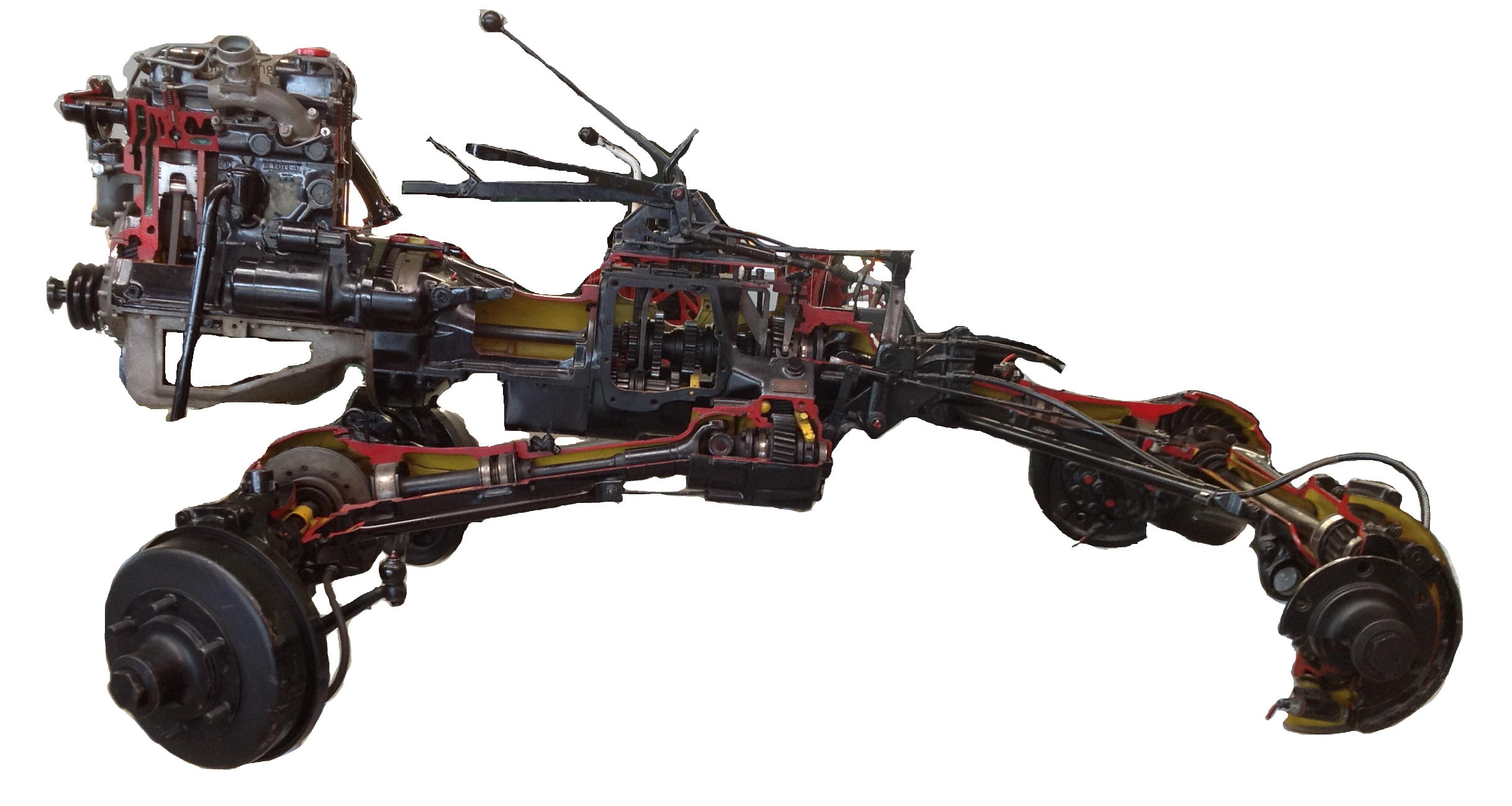
Cutaway drivetrain model of a Unimog 401 showing torque tubes

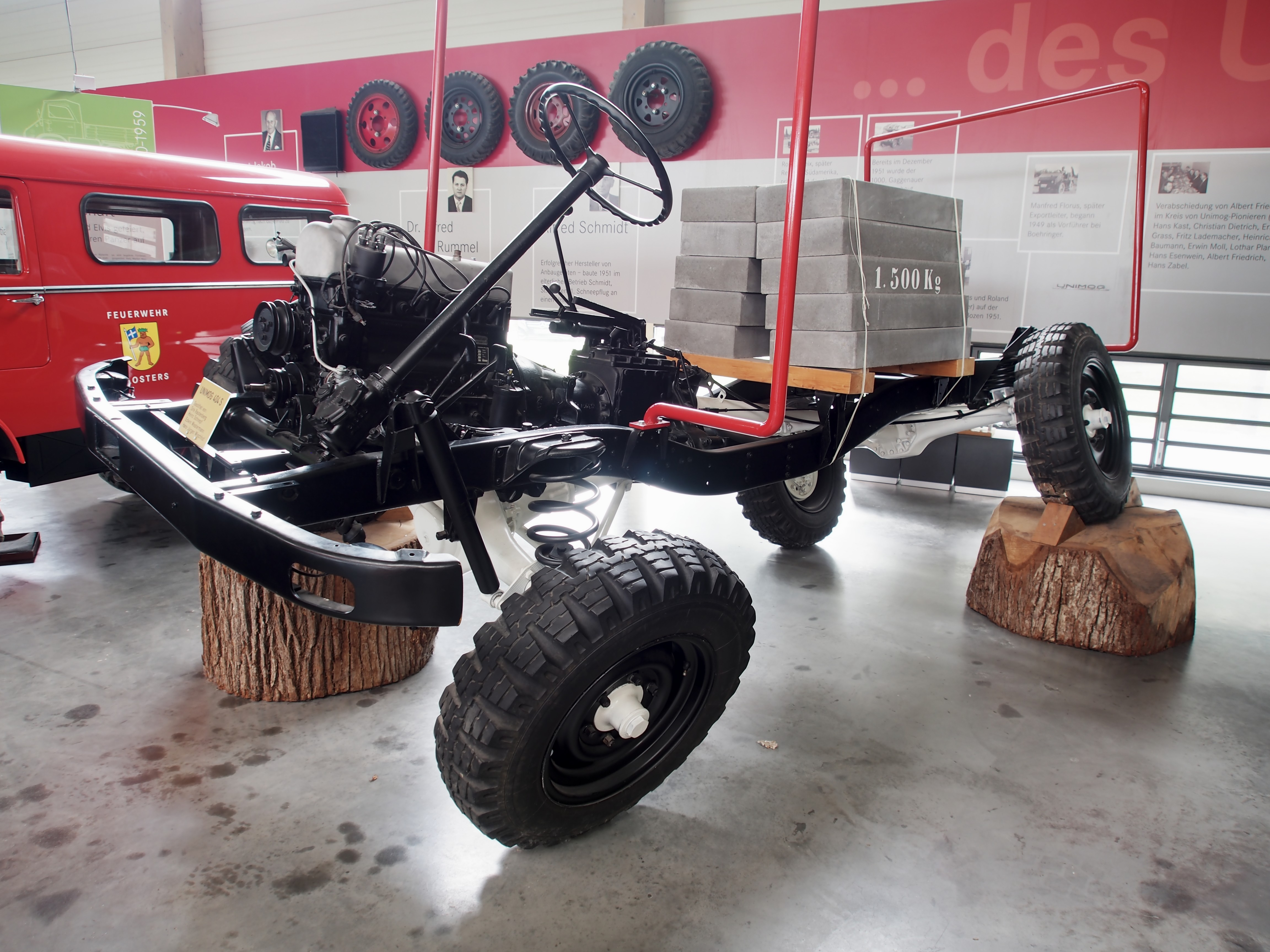
Chassis of a Unimog 404, showing extreme axle angle offset over two tree stumps, while the load, a pile of bricks, remains level. The red frames represent cabin and flatbed

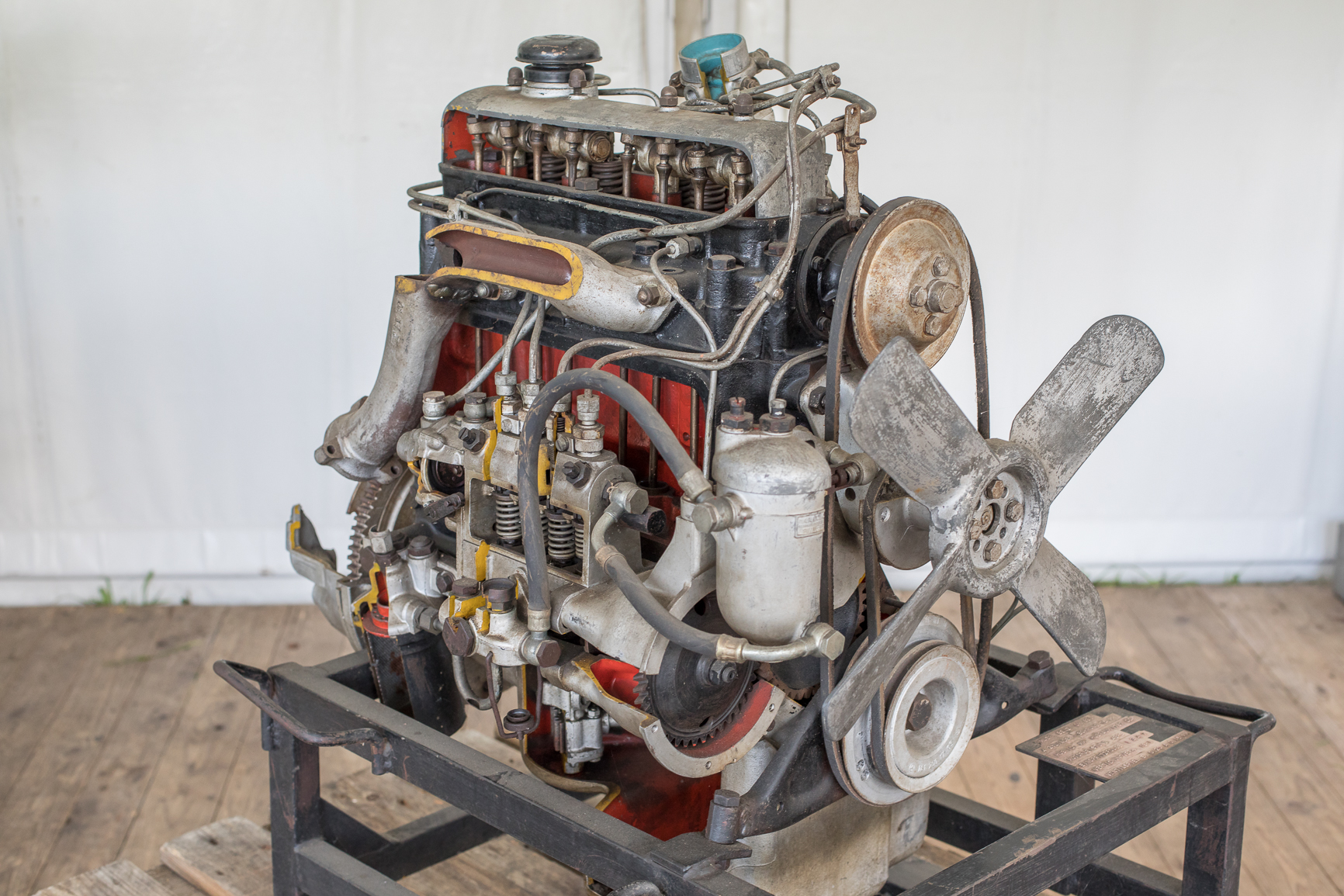
Mercedes-Benz OM636, the original Unimog Diesel engine

=== Chassis ===
Like other trucks, but unlike agricultural tractors, the Unimog is a body-on-frame vehicle with short overhangs. The original Unimog was made with a plane ladder frame and a wheelbase of 1720 mm. Later, the wheelbase was extended several times to accommodate customer needs. Starting in the mid-1950s, with the introduction of the Unimog 404, the frame received a drop. Originally, this was done to make space for a spare tyre, but soon engineers found out that the new frame would improve the torsion performance, which is why all following Unimog series also received a frame with a drop. Several mounting brackets, additional cross members and tool boards were offered as factory options for the frame.

=== Suspension ===
The Unimog has live front and rear axles that have portal gears (portal axles). Such axles have a lifted axle centre, but the wheels' centre remains unchanged, meaning that a high ground clearance can be achieved with small wheels and tyres. Unlike "regular" trucks, the Unimog has coil springs with hydraulic shock absorbers rather than leaf springs, as coil springs provide more spring travel. The axles themselves have only one longitudinal pivot point each, the so-called torque tubes. The torque tubes contain the drive shafts and connect the axles' differential gearboxes to the Unimog gearbox, but being also parts of the suspension system, the torque tubes prevent longitudinal movement of the axles, whilst still allowing limited vertical movement. Lateral axle movement is prevented by panhard rods and transverse links. This design results in extreme axle angle offsets of up to 30° possible.

A wide variety of wheels and tyres were available for the Unimog. Originally, the first Unimog was equipped with 6.5–18 in tyres designed for both on- and offroad use. Later, bigger wheels and tyres with different tread patterns were available, reaching from agricultural tractor tread patterns to massive bar tyre treads to low pressure ballon tyre treads. Until 1973, drum brakes were standard for all Unimogs, until they were replaced by disc brakes, however, until 1989, drum brakes remained an option for Unimogs of the 406-family. The steering system used to be a screw-and-nut system until 1970. Then it was replaced by a power assisted ball-and-nut system for the 406-series.

=== Drivetrain ===
The classical Unimog is rear-wheel drive vehicle, meaning that the rear axle is directly connected to the gearbox. Turning on front wheel drive automatically locks both axles, without torque compensation. The mechanical lever that turns on all wheel drive has a third position that locks front- and rear differentials. As of 1963, a pneumatic power switch was used instead of a lever. Due to the reduction gears inside the portal axles, the rotational frequency of the driveshafts inside the torque tubes is relatively high, meaning that the amount of torque they have to withstand is fairly low.

=== Gearbox ===
Traditionally, the Unimog has a splitter gearbox. Over the years, three different base gearbox designs have been used, all following the same principle, and having four gears and two ranges (called groups) and an additional direction gear. Those designs were UG-1/xx, UG-2/xx, and UG-3/xx. UG is an abbreviation for Unimog-Getriebe (Unimog-Gearbox), the number after the slash resembles the input torque in kp·m (=9.80665 N·m). (Note: The kilopondmetre (kp·m) is the traditional technical unit of torque used in many European countries until the early 1980s. It equals the force that a mass of 1 kilogram applies. If the acceleration is exactly 9.80665 m·s^{−2} (default gravitational acceleration), this equals 9.80665 N·m.) Until 1955, the Unimog base gearbox UG-1 was a constant-mesh countershaft gearbox, it was then upgraded with synchroniser rings to a synchromesh gearbox. However, the synchromesh-version was only used for the 404-series, and the constant-mesh version remained the standard gearbox for the 411-series. In 1957, the synchromesh-version became an option for the 411-series, before it became the standard gearbox for all Unimogs in 1959. The following gearbox versions UG-2 and UG-3 were made as synchromesh versions only.

There are different layouts of the gearbox, namely F-layout and G-layout as well as their upgraded layouts, not having particular names. The F-layout is the original gearbox layout and is limited to the first two gears in the first range as it does not have selector sleeves, meaning that in total there are six forward gears. Instead of a reverse gear, the gearbox has its direction gear, which, in theory, can be used to reverse any gear. Due to the lacking shifting sleeves however, the reverse direction can only be used in the first range, which itself is limited to the first two gears, resulting in only two reverse gears (resulting in six forward and two reverse gears). To operate the gearbox, there is only one shift lever with a six-speed H-layout, the gearbox shifts its ranges automatically. An additional shift lever is used for shifting into reverse. The G-layout has an additional reduction gearbox, which can be used in all gears. This effectively doubles the number of gears (twelve forward and four reverse gears). This reduction gearbox was also available with an additional crawler gear, which can only be used in the first range (twenty forward and eight reverse gears). As of 1976, shifting sleeves were added and a four-speed-H-layout replaced the six-speed-H-layout, which allows using all gears in all ranges. With the introduction of the UG-3-gearbox, the standard gearbox-shifter-layout was changed to an eight-speed-H-H-layout, with eight gears on one lever, without any additional switches. When shifting from "4th" into "5th" gear, the gearbox automatically shifts into range 2 and back into gear 1. Crawler gearboxes were offered as a factory option for the UG-3 gearbox as well, resulting in 24 gears. The design with the additional direction gear was kept, which means that all 24 gears can also be used in reverse mode. Since the highest final gear ratio allows top speeds of up to 110 km/h, and the reverse gear only comes with a small reduction of 1:1.03, the top speed in reverse mode is more than 100 km/h. To prevent such high reverse speeds, a lock for the second range was available as a factory option, allowing only the first range (gears "1" to "4") in reverse mode.

=== Engine ===
The initial Unimogs were equipped with passenger car engines, the first Unimog series to receive a truck engine was the 406-series in 1963. All engines use the Diesel principle, except for engines used for the Unimog 404-series and the first four Unimog prototypes, which use the Otto principle. The following engines were used as of 1947, with M being Otto and OM being Diesel engines (the list is incomplete):

- M 136
- M 130
- M 180
- OM 636
- OM 621
- OM 615
- OM 616
- OM 312
- OM 314
- OM 352
- OM 353

=== Cab ===
Traditionally, three different cab options were available for the Unimog: An open roof cab (Cabrio), single cab and double cab, with the single cab being the most popular. Because the Unimog was designed to be a better agricultural tractor, its original design did not include a closed cab (as agricultural tractors in Germany usually did not have a closed cab in the 1940s). The first Unimog series to be officially offered with a cab was the 401-series. However, the first cabs were made by Westfalia in Rheda-Wiedenbrück and then shipped to the Unimog plant in Gaggenau for assembly. These cabs are known as Westfalia type B or simply Froschauge ('frog's eye'). Starting in 1957, a new cab with 30% more volume, called Westfalia type DvF, Typ D, verbreitertes Fahrerhaus (Type D, widened cab), was used. Both Westfalia cabs were fairly narrow and came with the problem of engine heat causing high cabin temperatures. The first Unimog that was designed with a cab was the series 406. Just for the purpose of manufacturing cabs, Daimler-Benz built a new 1000-Megapond-sheet-panel-press in the Unimog plant. It was planned that the double cab parts would also be produced with this press, instead, the double cabs were manufactured by Wackenhut in Nagold. In 1974, the current heavy-duty-series' cab was introduced. Its basic design has not been changed since. The equipment carrier versions' cab on the other hand has received several modifications since its introduction in the late 1980s, with the current version being introduced in 2000.

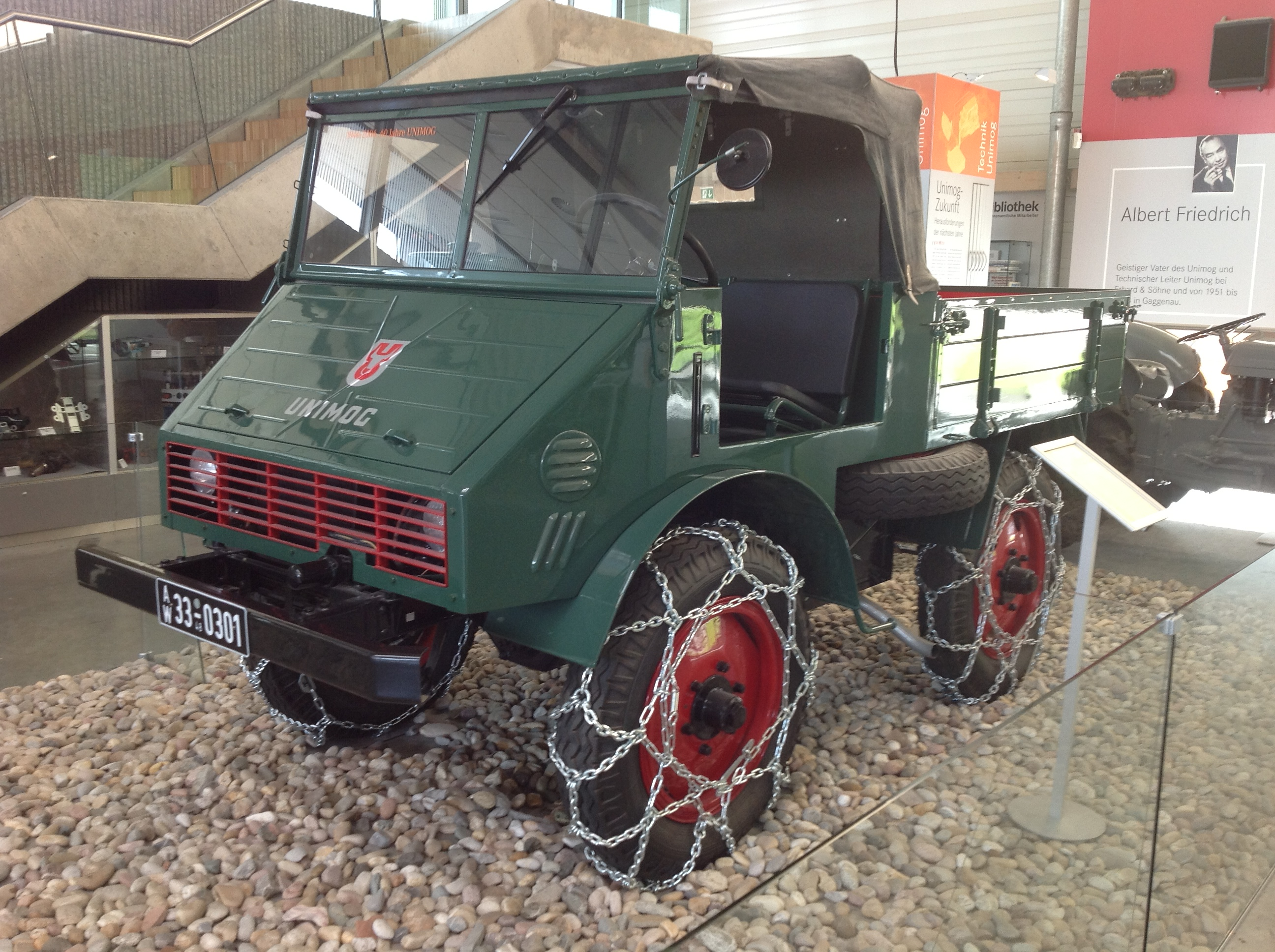
1948 Unimog U6, second oldest Unimog that still exists to this day, it is a Cabrio version without doors.

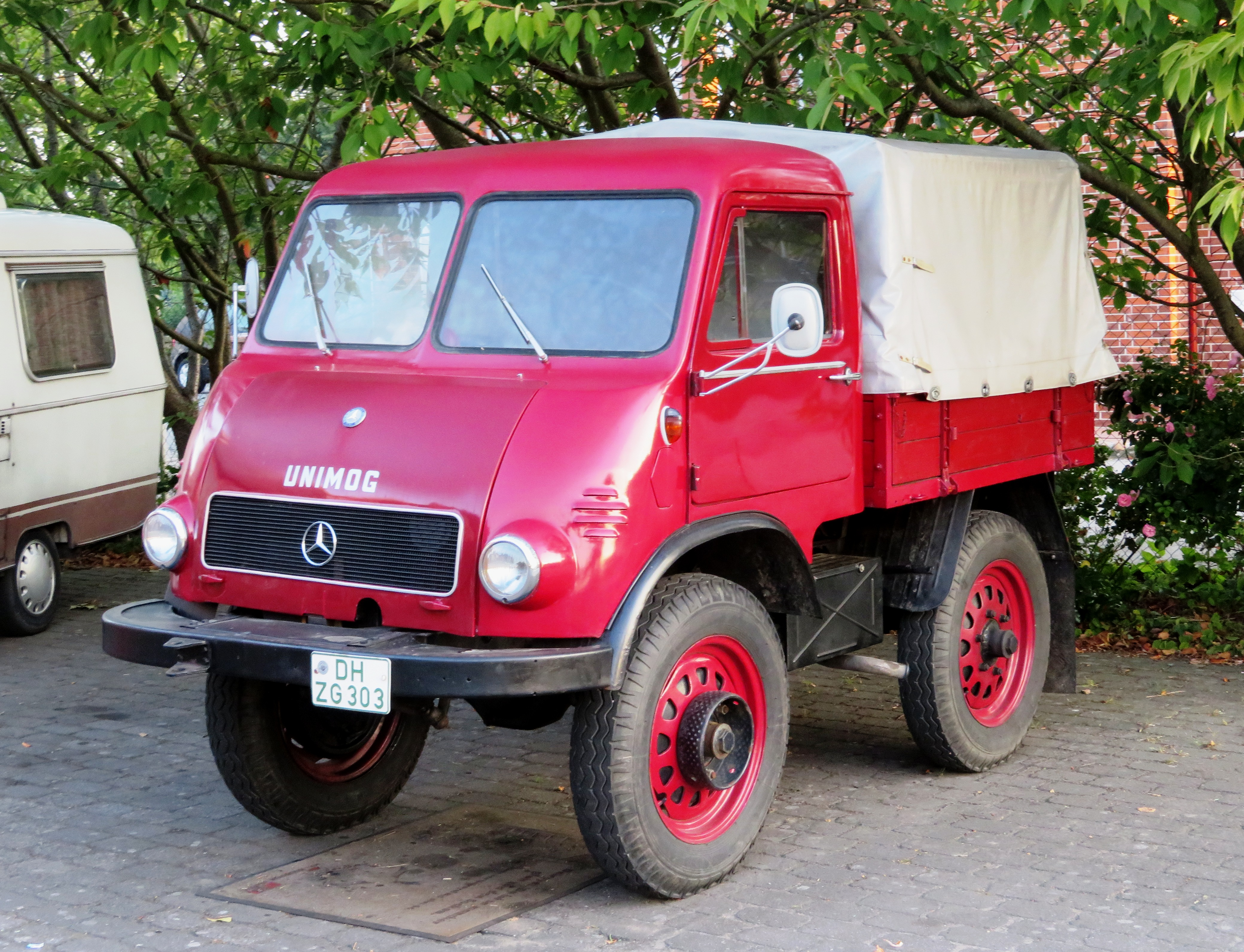
1954 Unimog 401 with Westfalia B cab

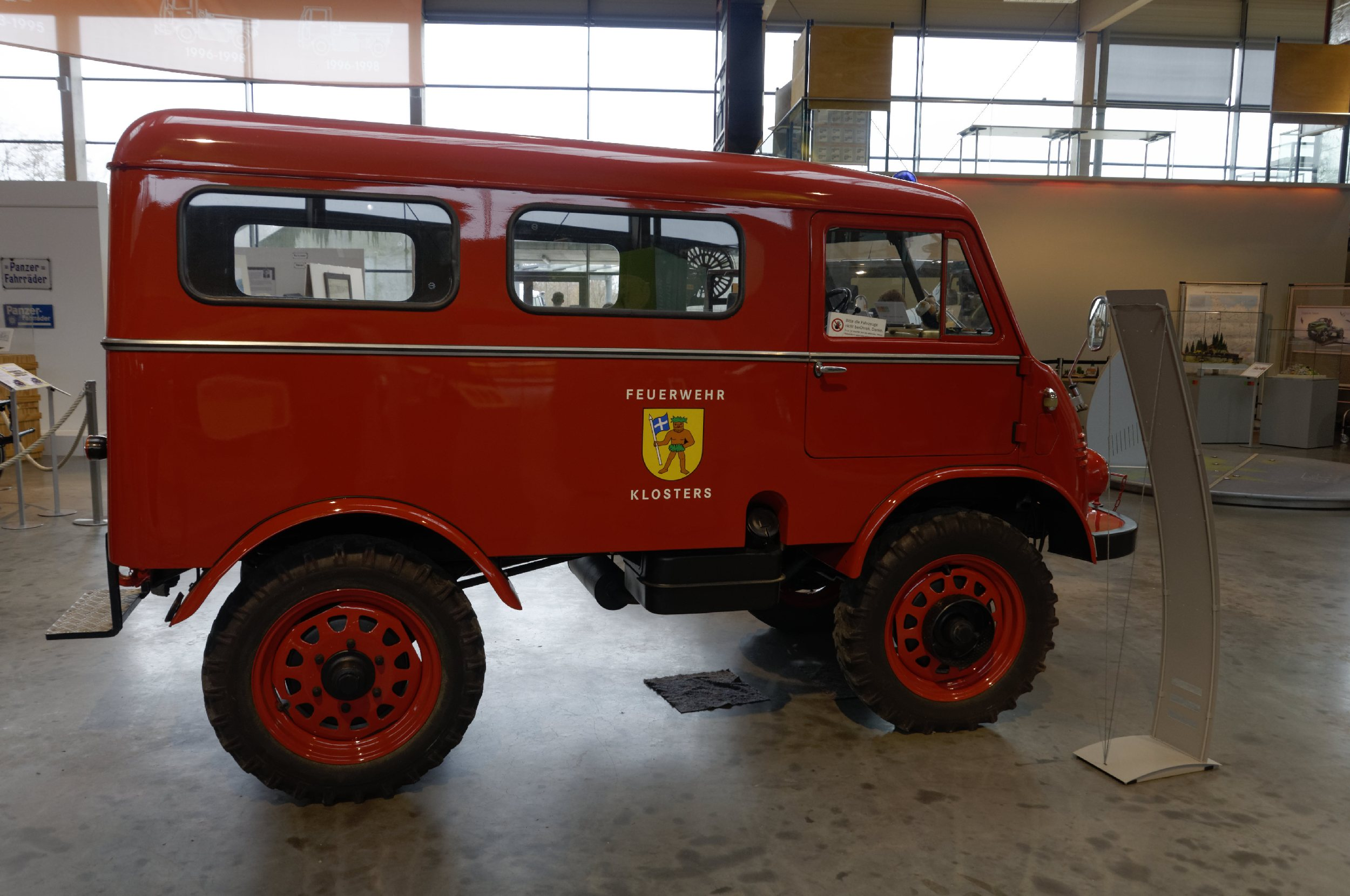
1954 Unimog 402 with Westfalia B crew cab

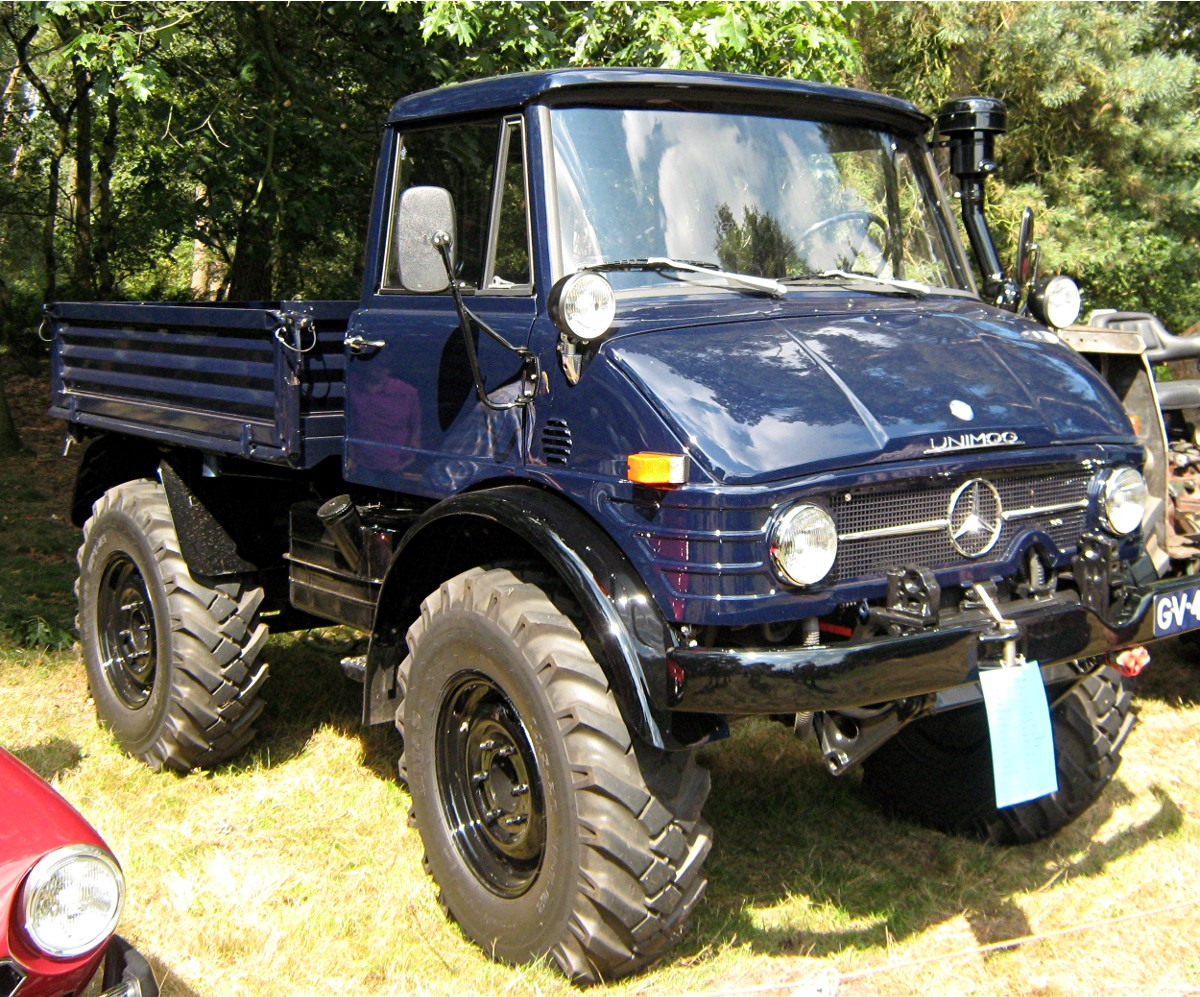
Unimog 406 with Daimler-Benz cab

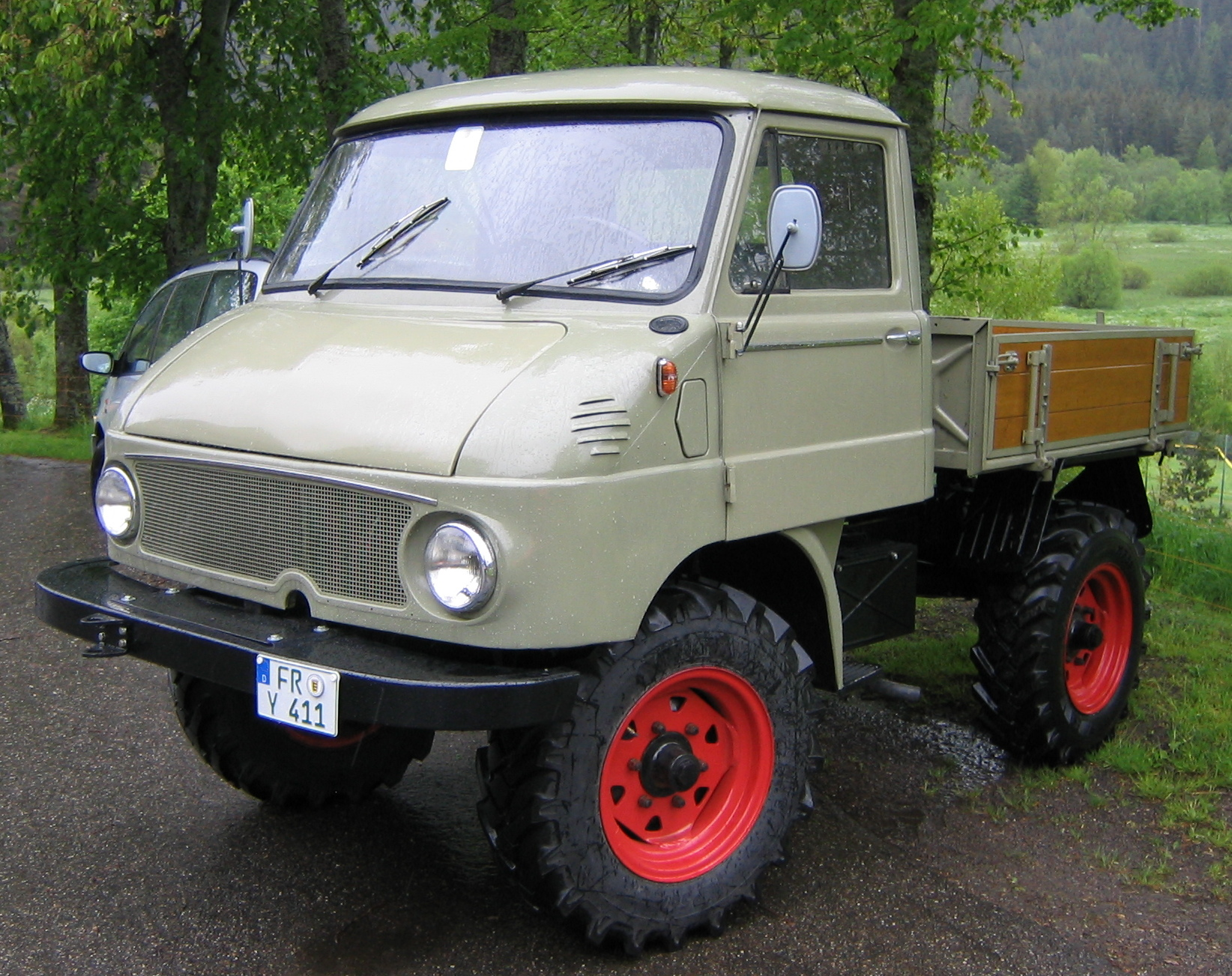
1959 Unimog 411 with Westfalia DvF cab

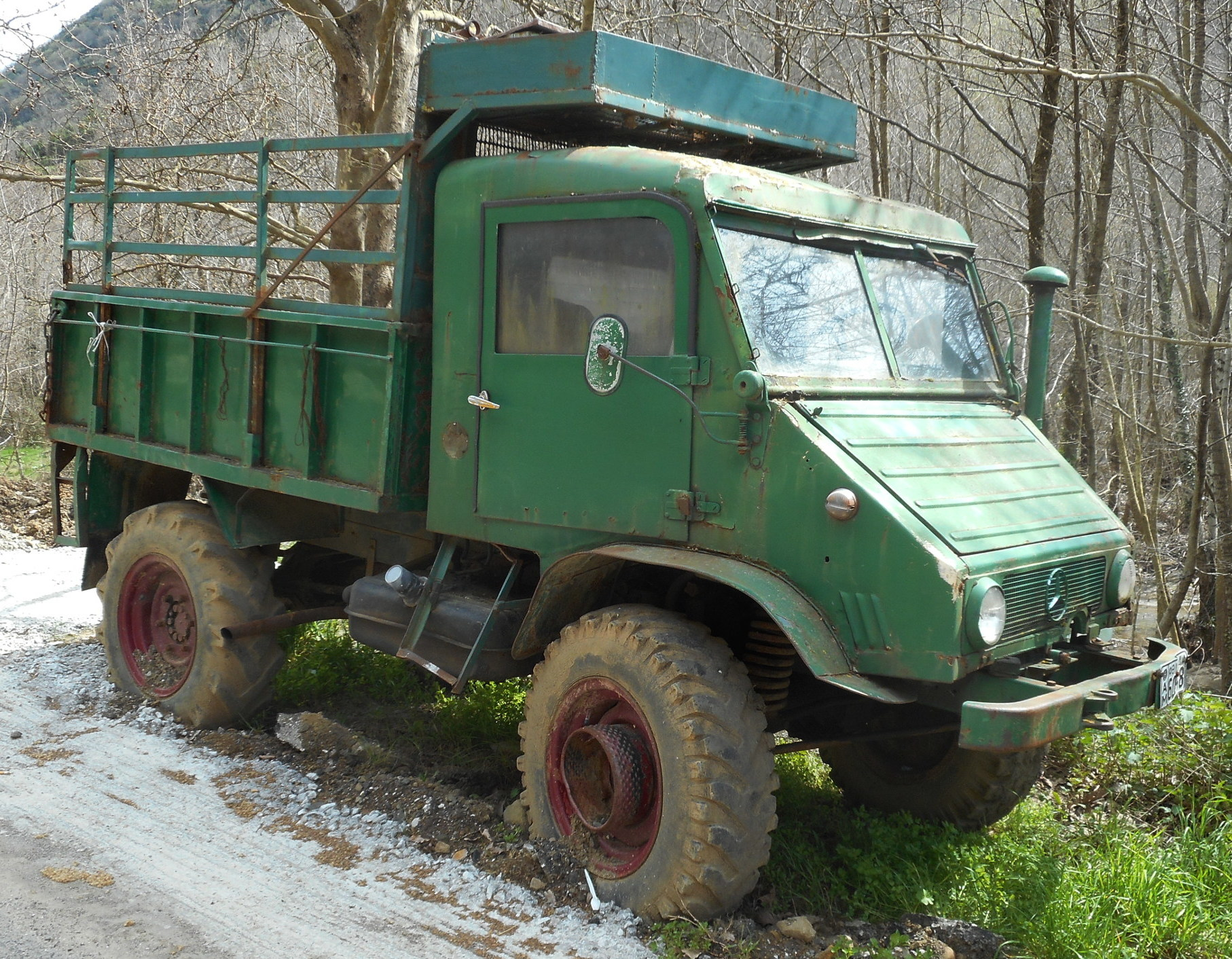
1966 Unimog 411c with a self-made cab

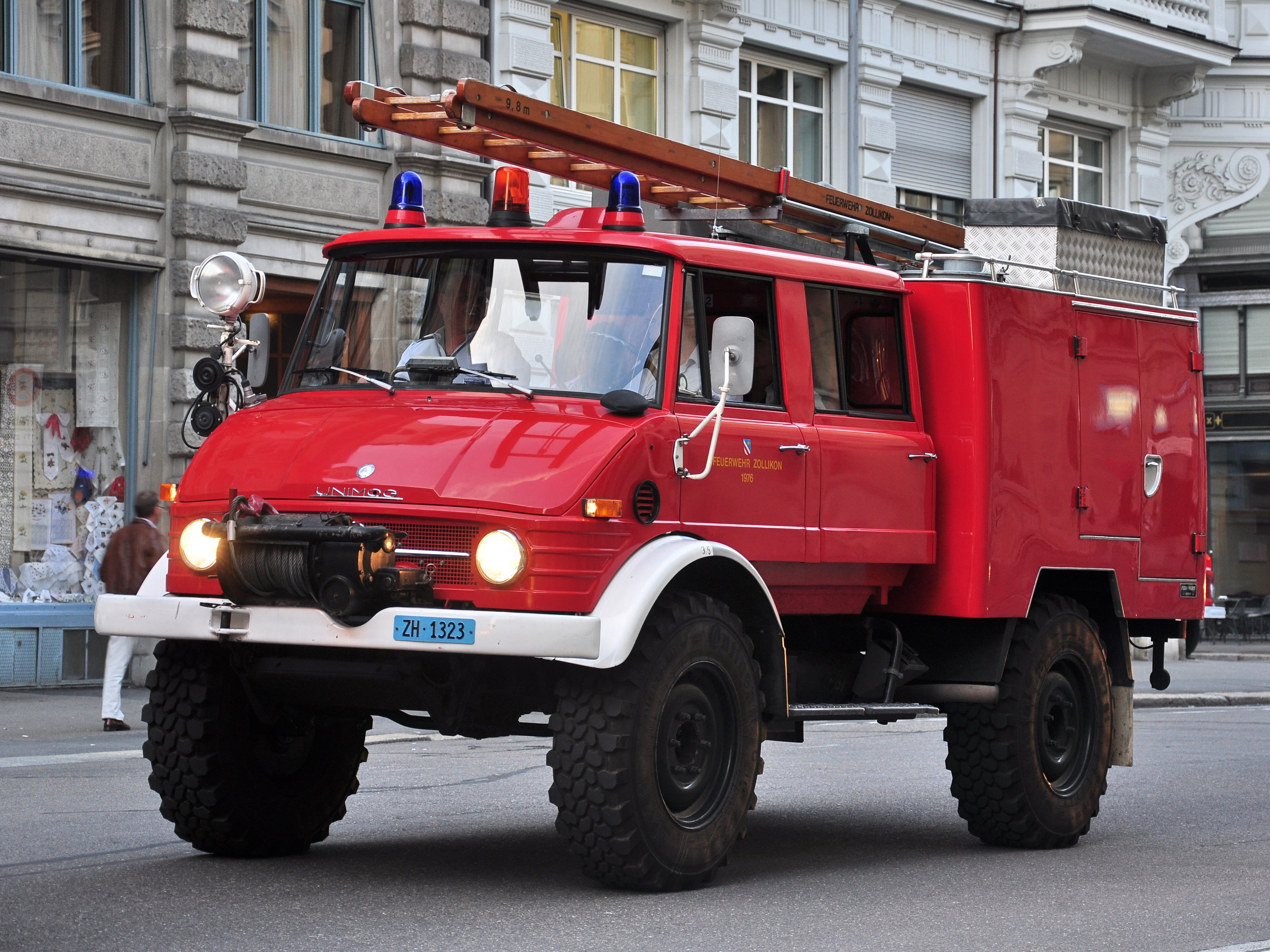
1970s Unimog 416 with Wackenhut crew cab

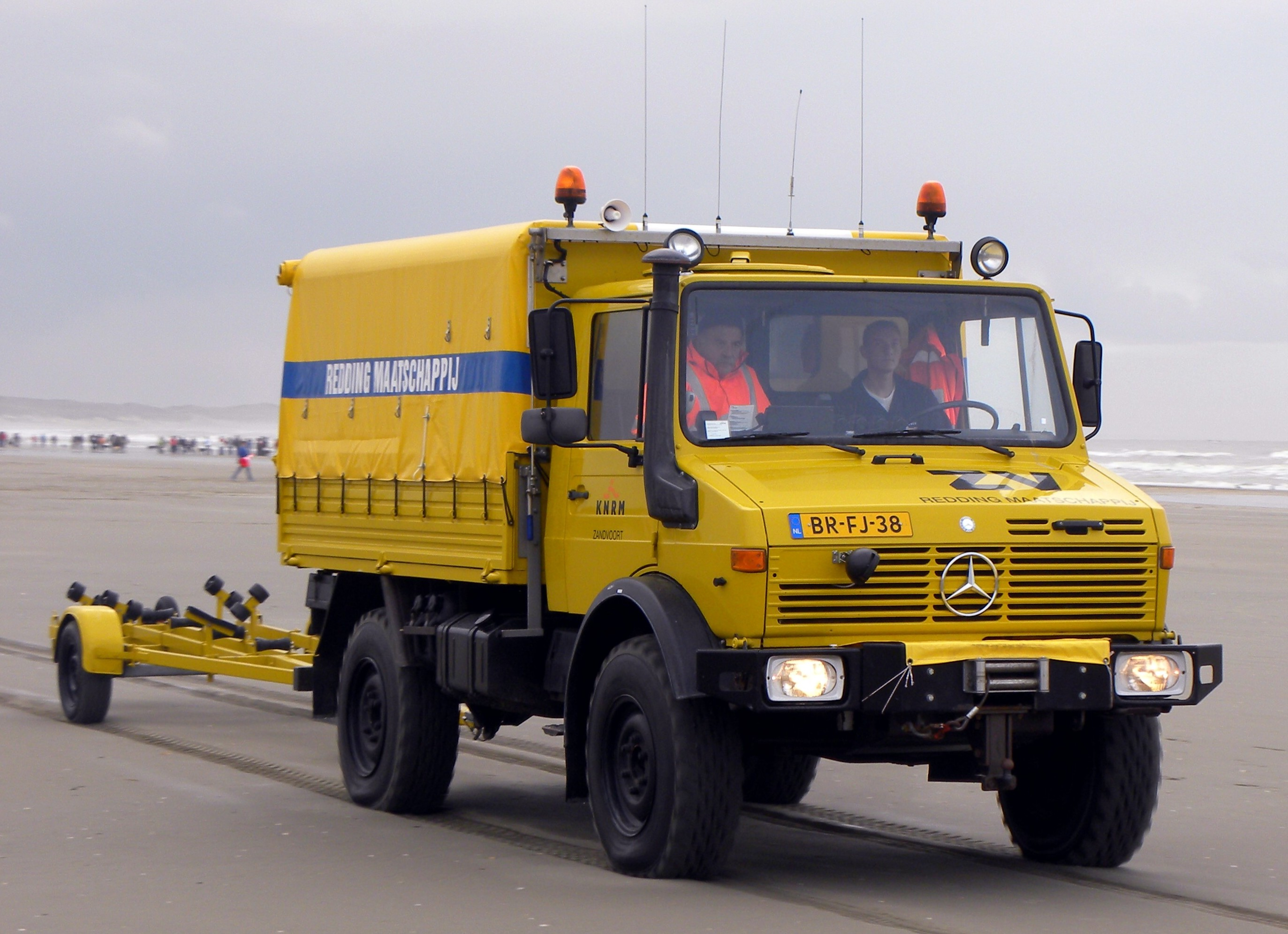
1975 Unimog 435 with single cab

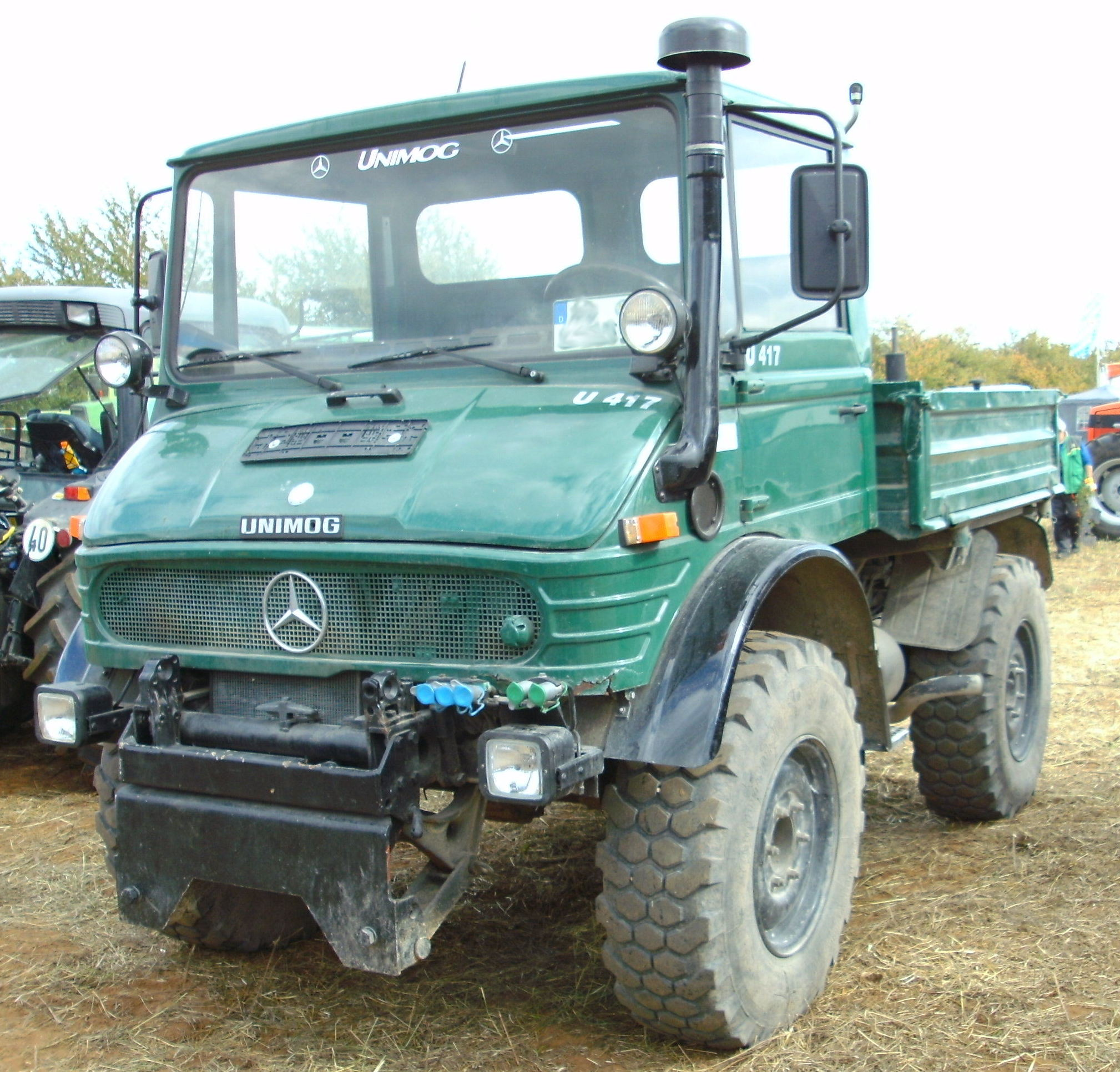
1988 Unimog 417 with single cab

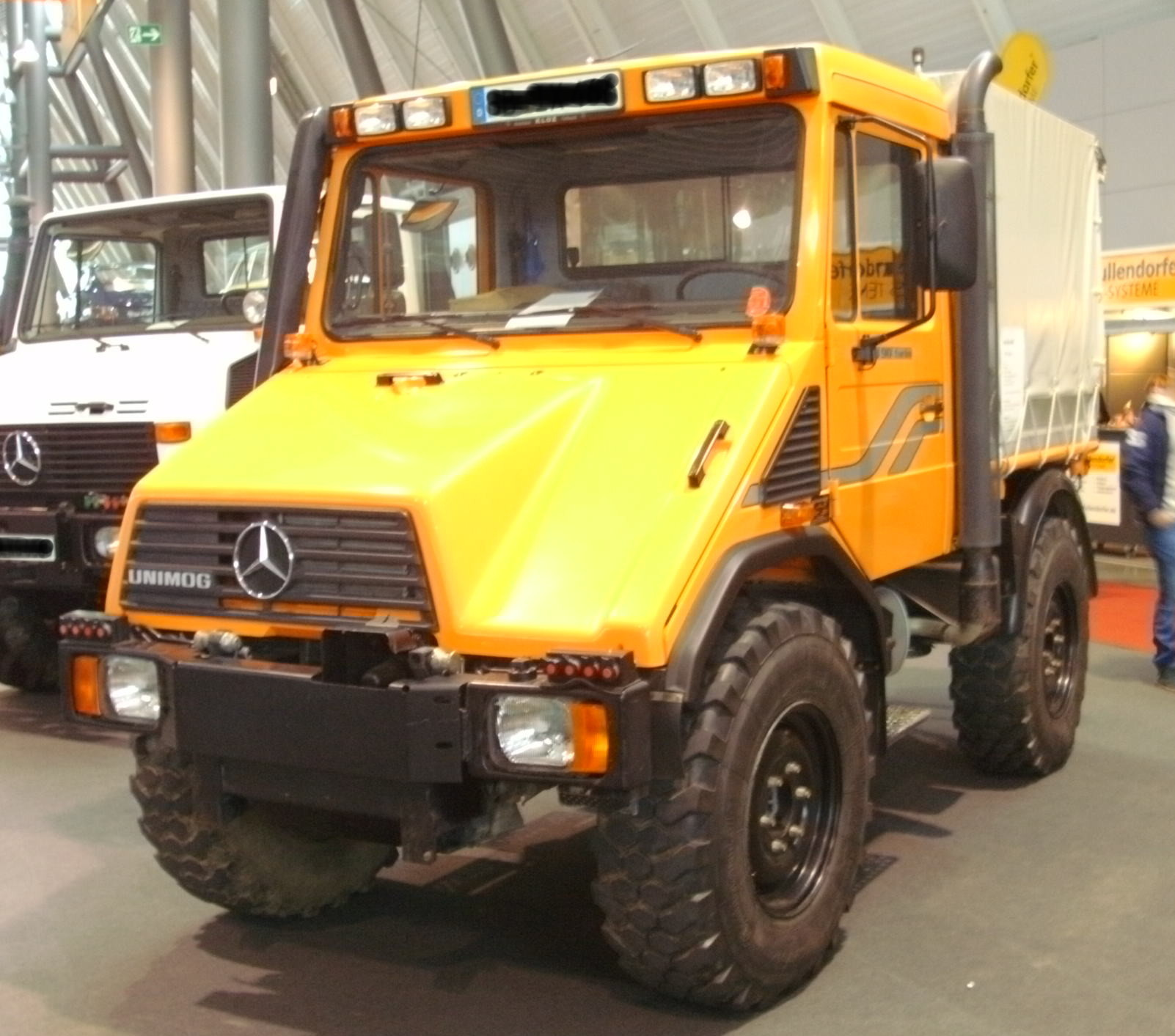
1997 Unimog 408 with single cab

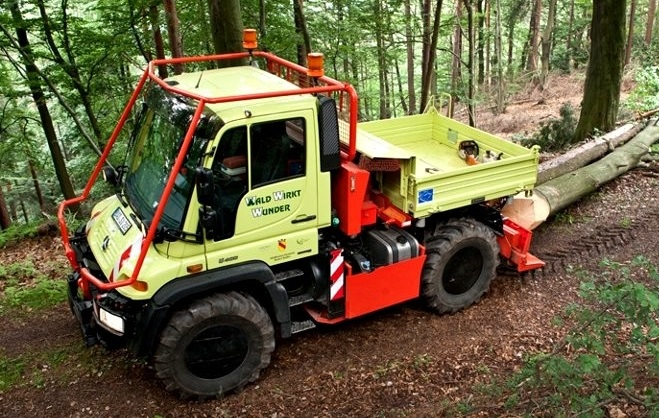
2000 Unimog 405 with single cab

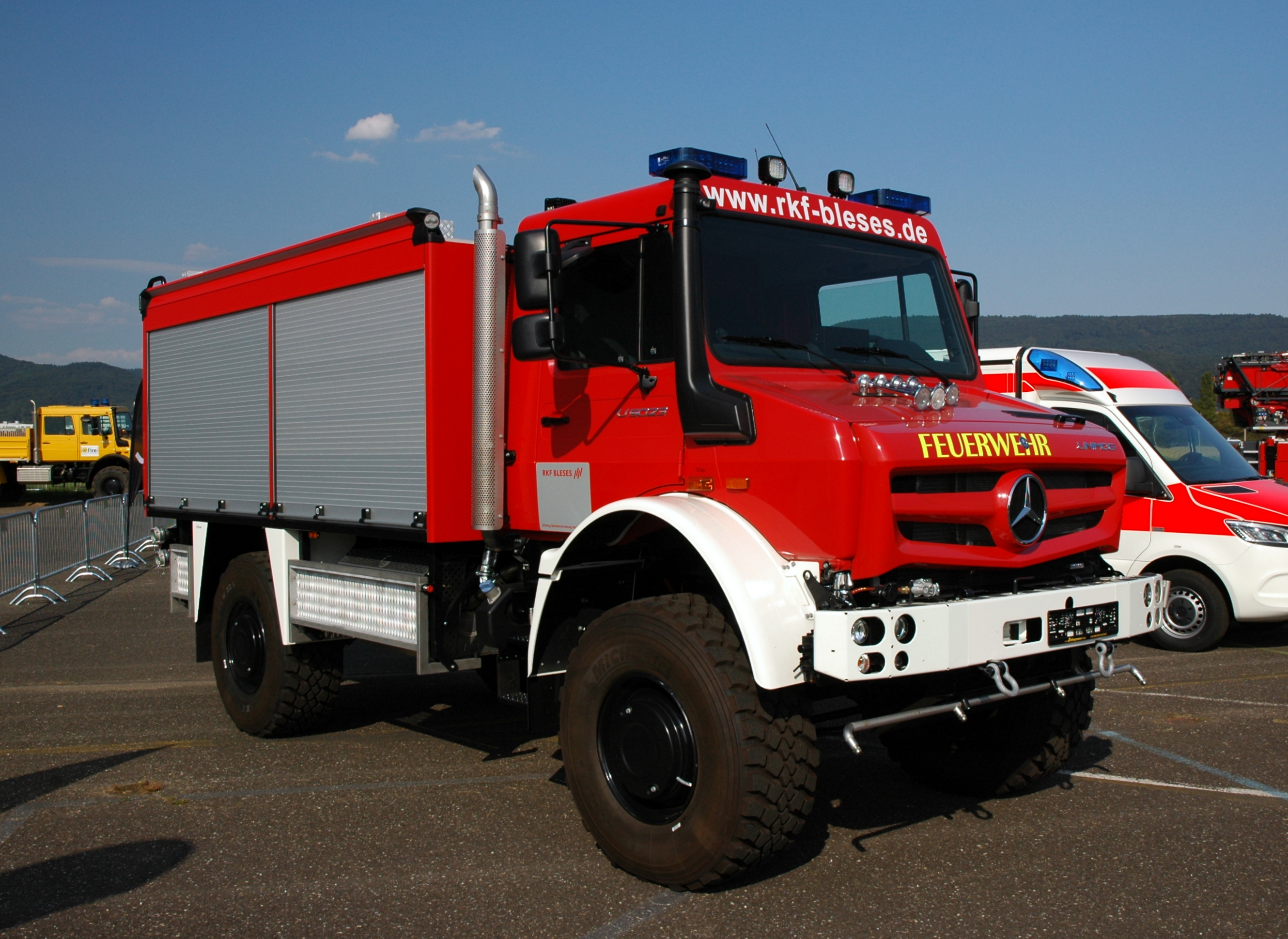
2018 Unimog 437.4 with the same cab as the 1975 model

=== Pneumatics and hydraulics ===
The original Unimog was offered with a pneumatic system. This system was used for powering all auxiliary devices as well as the three-point linkages. As of October 1961, a hydraulics system became an option, and as of 1963, the hydraulics system became standard, but unlike the pneumatics system, the hydraulics system was made by Westinghouse Air Brake Company in Hannover. With the introduction of the hydraulics system, the pneumatics system was solely used for operating the brakes.

== Users ==
=== Military ===
The Unimog was never meant to be a military vehicle; Allied permission to develop the Unimog was granted only because Albert Friedrich, inventor of the Unimog, ensured that the Unimog would not have any military purpose. However, the Unimog has always been used as a military vehicle. 44 Unimogs of the first model, the Unimog 70200, served as combat engineer tractors in the Swiss army. They proved successful, and the Swiss army purchased 540 units of the 70200's successor, the Unimog 2010. These early Swiss military vehicles were known as ″Dieseli″. The Dieseli-Unimogs remained in service until 1989. Officers of the French army, then occupying forces in Germany, noted the Unimog testing at the Sauberg in the early 1950s and considered the Unimog useful for patrolling purposes. Soon after, the French army purchased Unimogs of the series 2010 and 401. The Unimog proved to be so successful that Daimler-Benz was ordered to develop an entirely new Unimog just for military purposes. This new model was supposed to be a small 1.5-tonne truck, capable of carrying 10 to 12 soldiers on its bed, at a speed of up to 90 km/h, rather than being an agricultural tractor. Being a NATO member state, France demanded that the military Unimog would have an engine running on petrol. Daimler-Benz decided to use an Otto cycle engine, the M 180, displacing 2.2 litres, and producing 85 PS (63 kW). The military Unimog would later be known as Unimog 404 or Unimog S.

In total, 64,242 units of the Unimog 404 were produced, which makes it the Unimog with the highest production figure. 36,638 Unimog 404 were purchased by the German Bundeswehr. Apart from the Bundeswehr, many different military forces have either used the Unimog in the past or still make use of it today. In addition to the military series 404, several civilian models have been adapted for military use. In Argentina, the series 426, actually a version of the civilian series 416 produced under licence, was made for the Argentinian, Chilean, Peruvian and Bolivian military. In total, 2643 units of the series 426 were made. The Argentinian made Unimog 431, which was a licensed version of the civilian series 421, was also used as a military vehicle, mainly as a self-propelled howitzer. Another civilian Unimog that was mainly used a military vehicle, is the series 418.

The military Unimogs are used as troop transportation vehicles, ambulances, and mobile command centers equipped with military communications equipment. The United States Marine Corps and United States Army uses the Unimog 419 as an engineer tractor, while the United States Army also uses Unimog vehicles to access remote installations. In total, 2416 Unimog 419 were made, and only used by United States Forces. Modern Unimogs also serve as military vehicles, and the current Unimog 437.4 chassis is used for the ATF Dingo. More than 5,500 Unimogs are in active service in the Turkish Armed Forces. They were produced by Mercedes-Benz Türk.

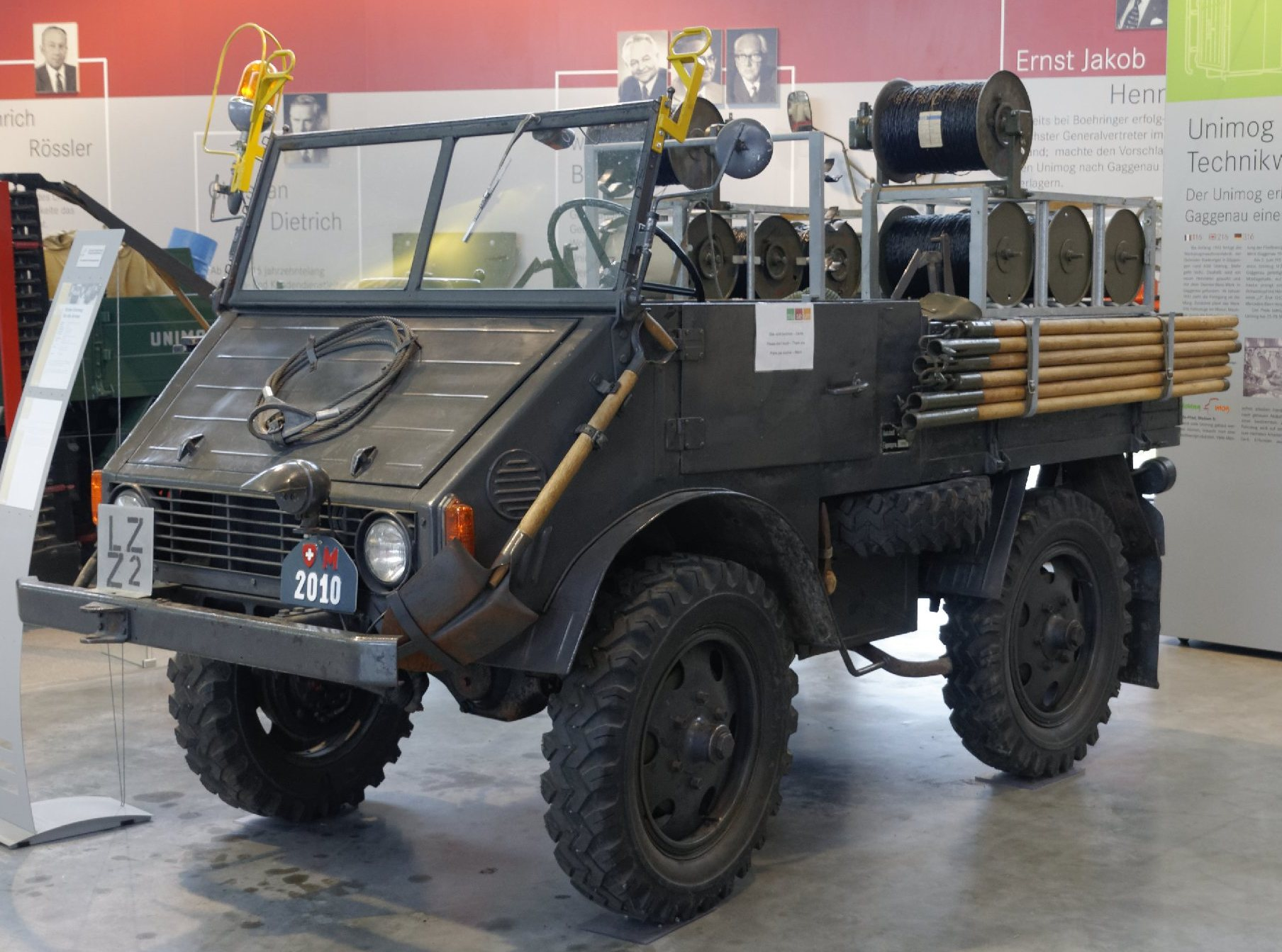
Swiss army ″Dieseli″ Unimog 2010

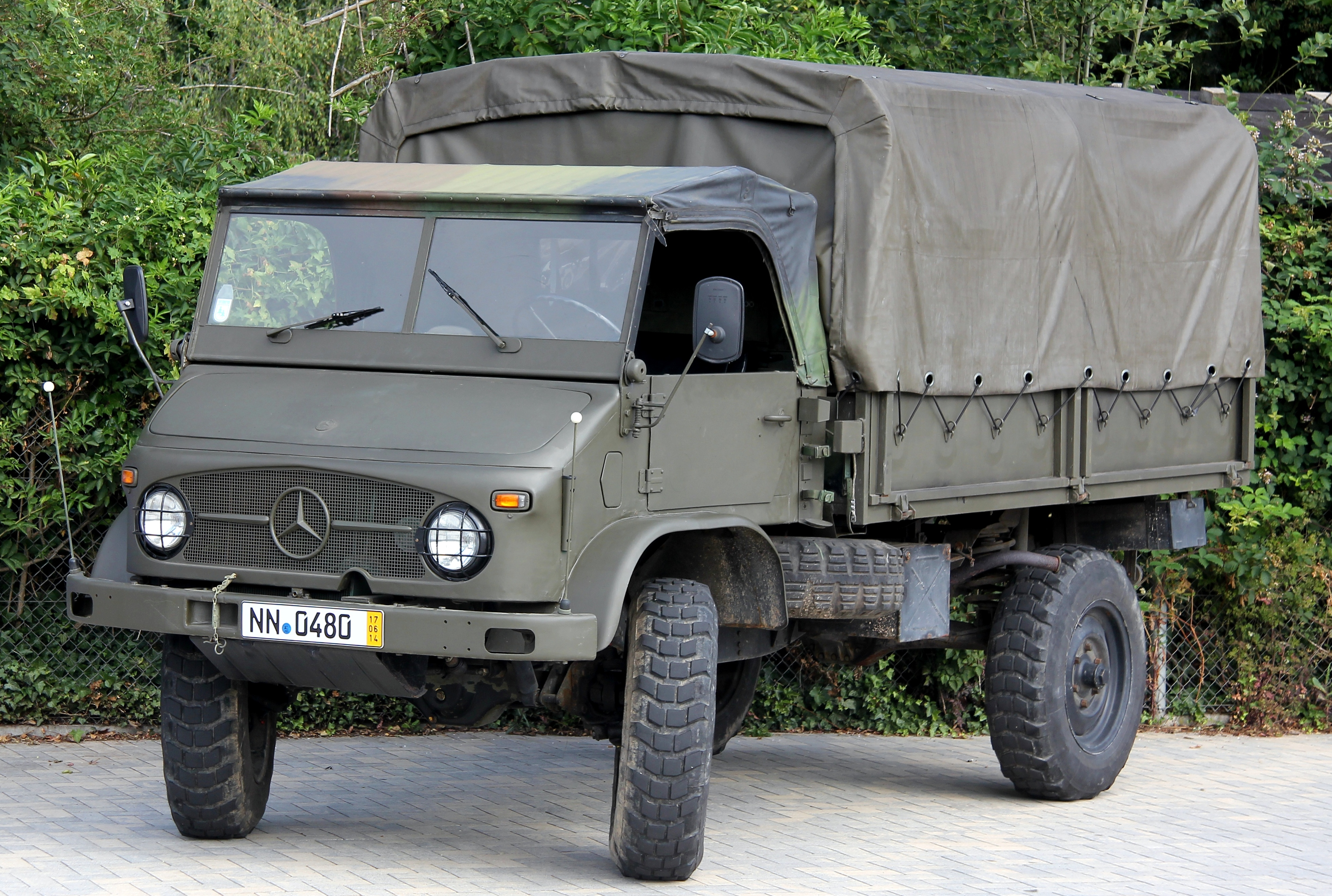
The first Unimog solely designed for military purposes, the Unimog 404 from 1955

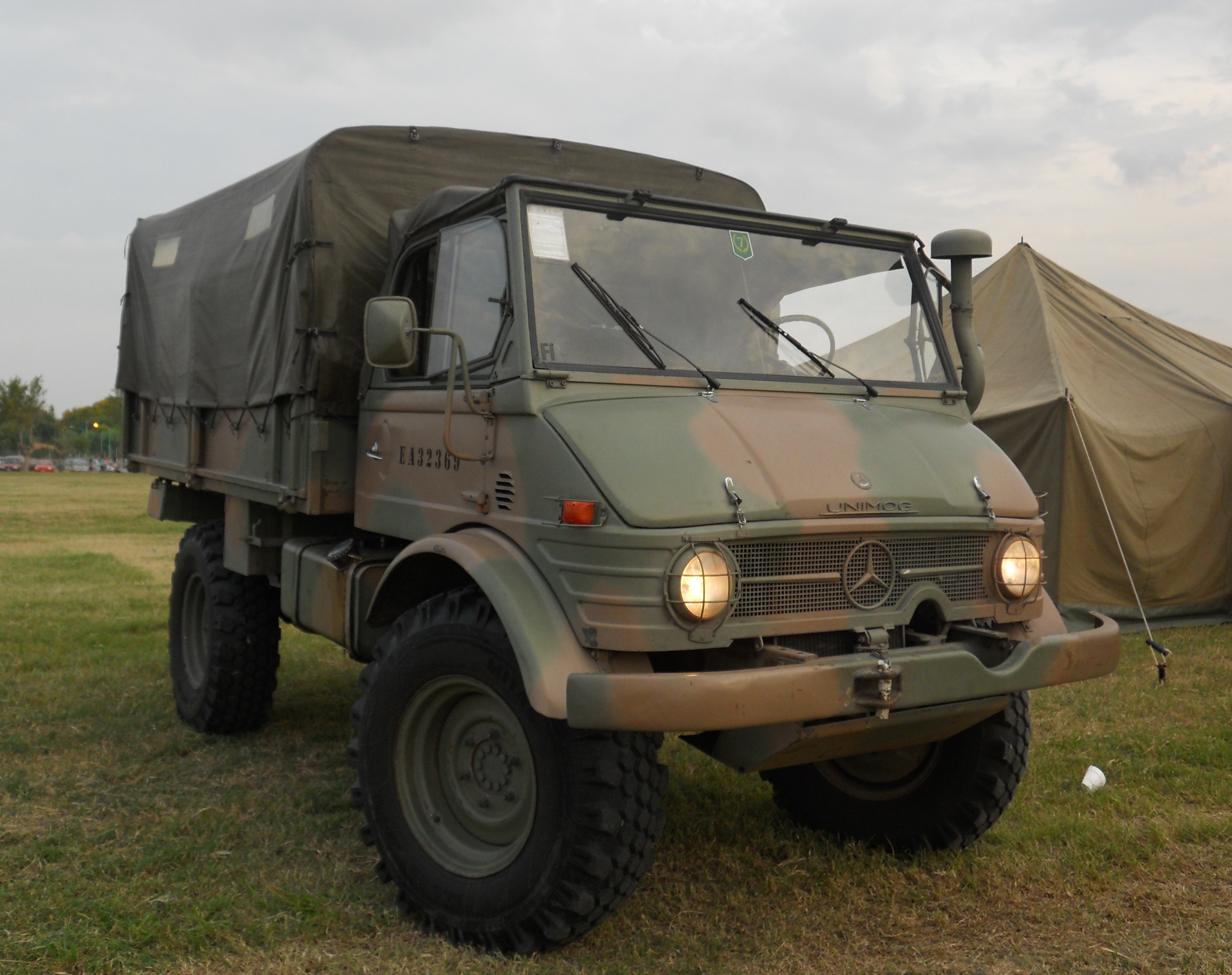
Argentine Army Unimog 426

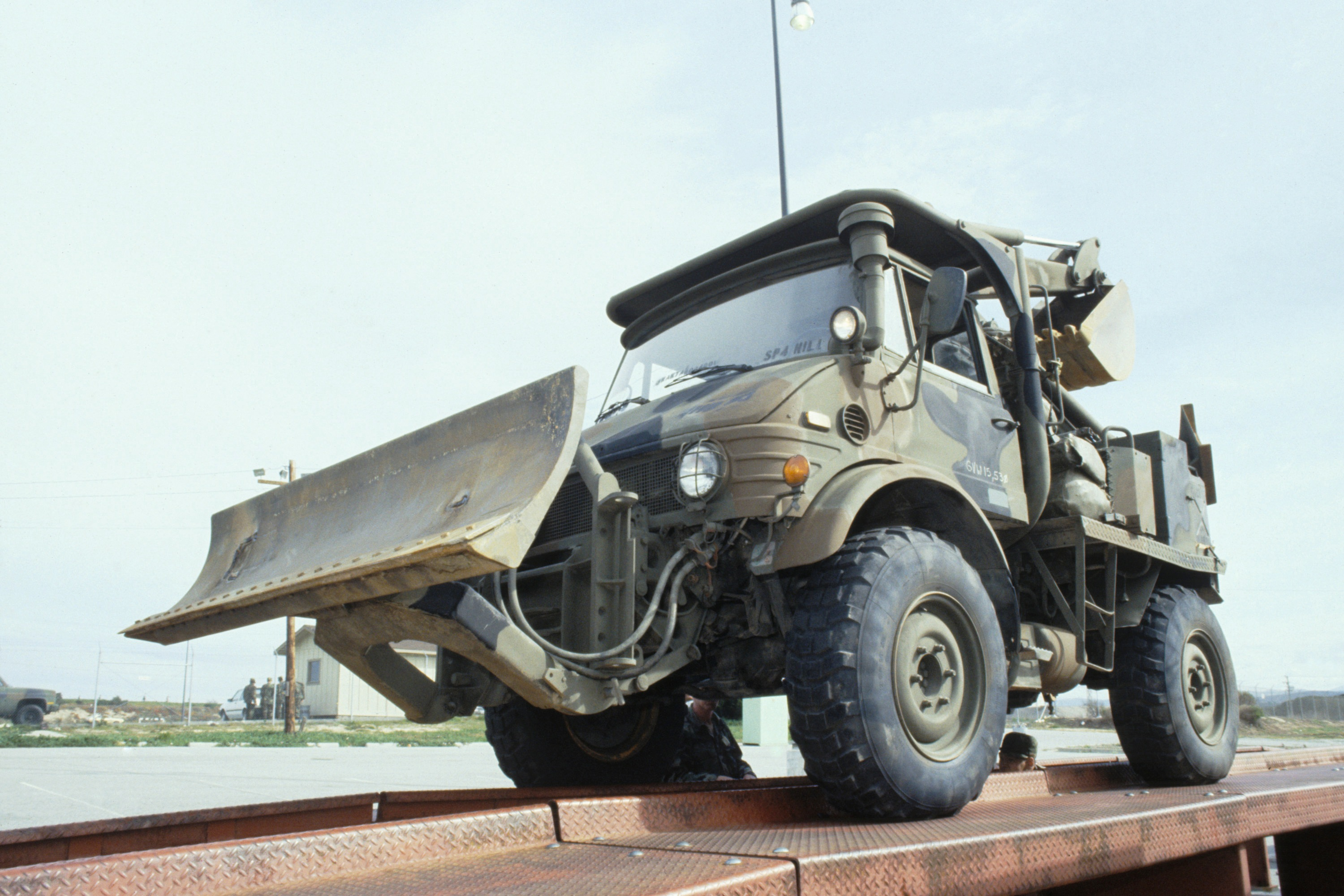
Unimog 419

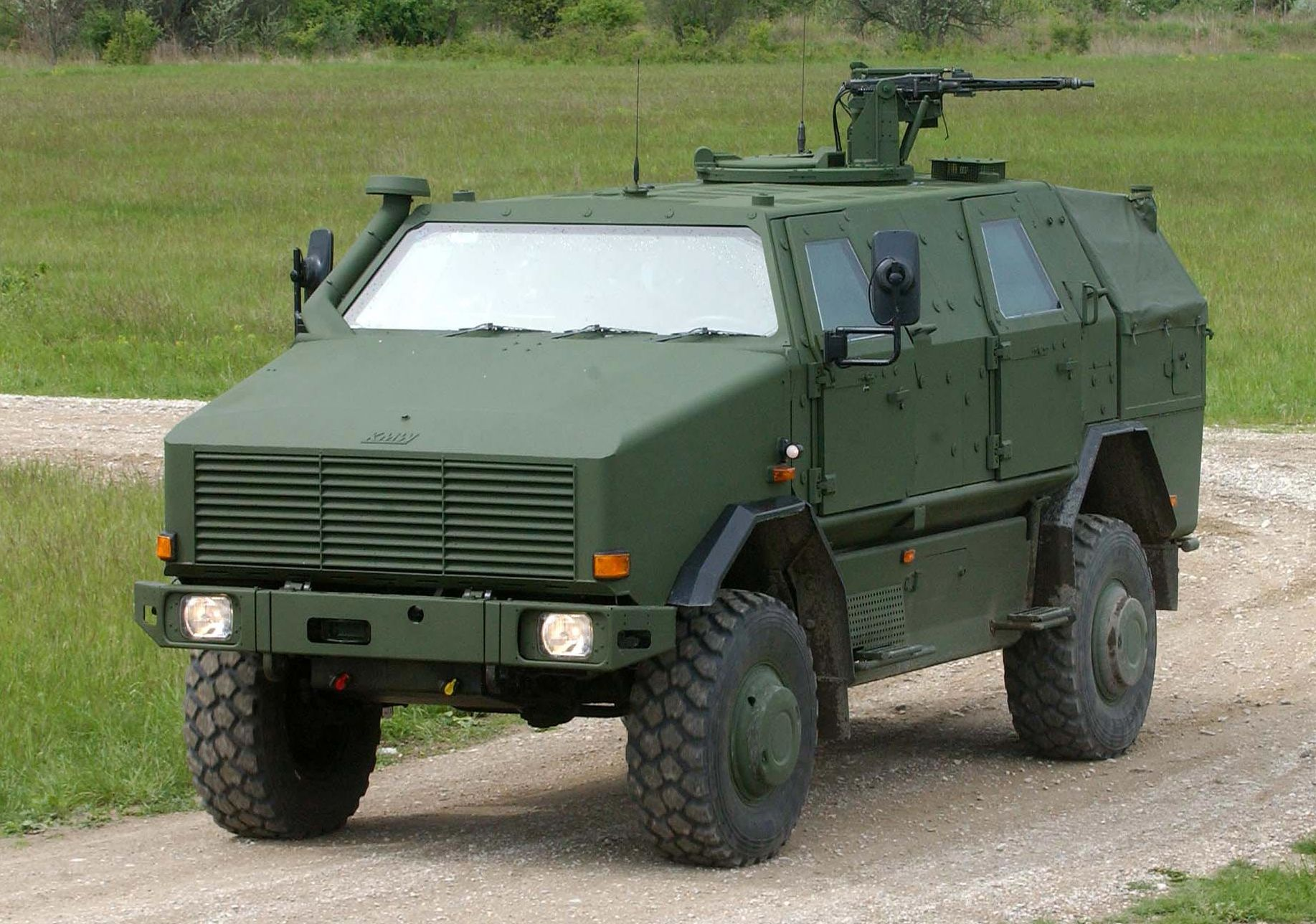
ATF Dingo

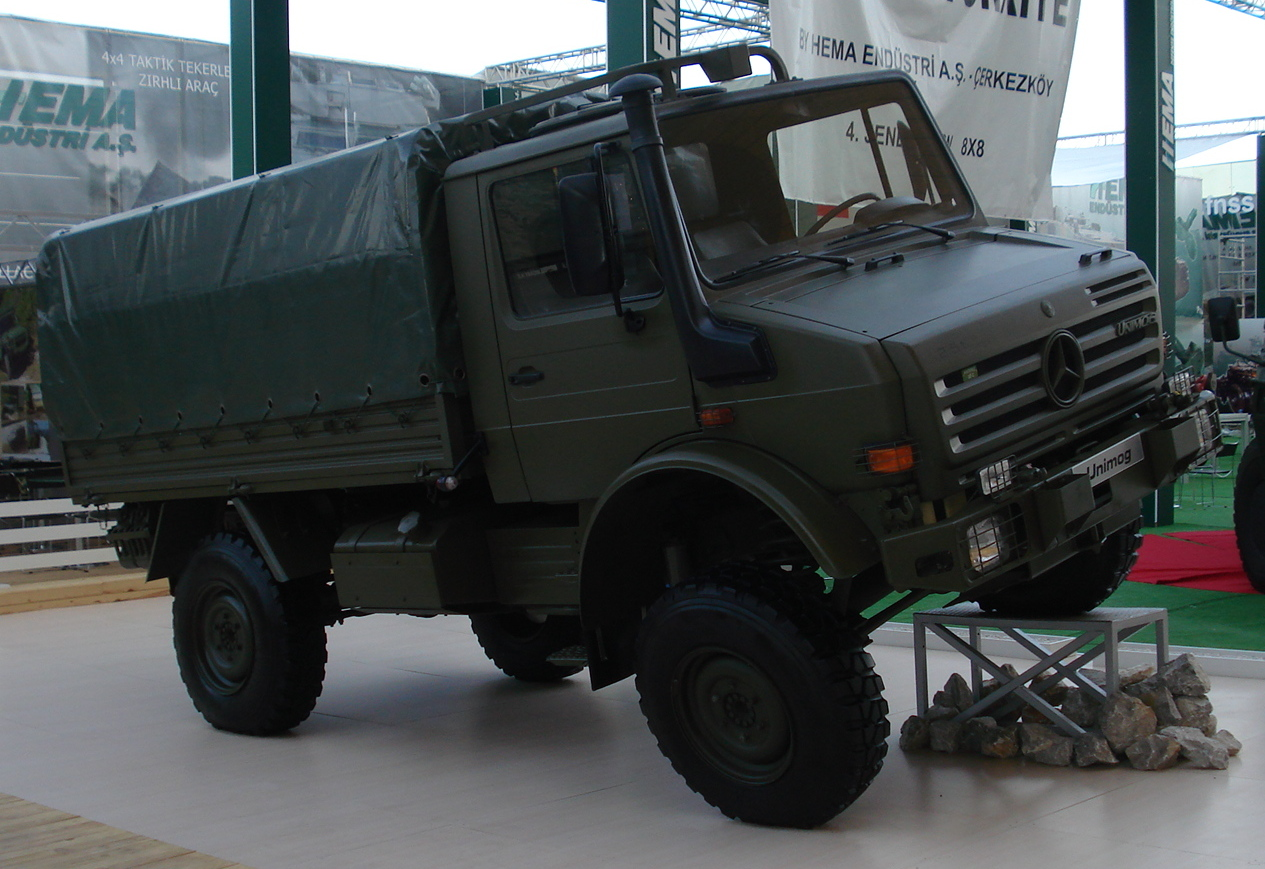
Mercedes Benz Unimog locally produced in Turkey and still widely used by Turkish Land Forces

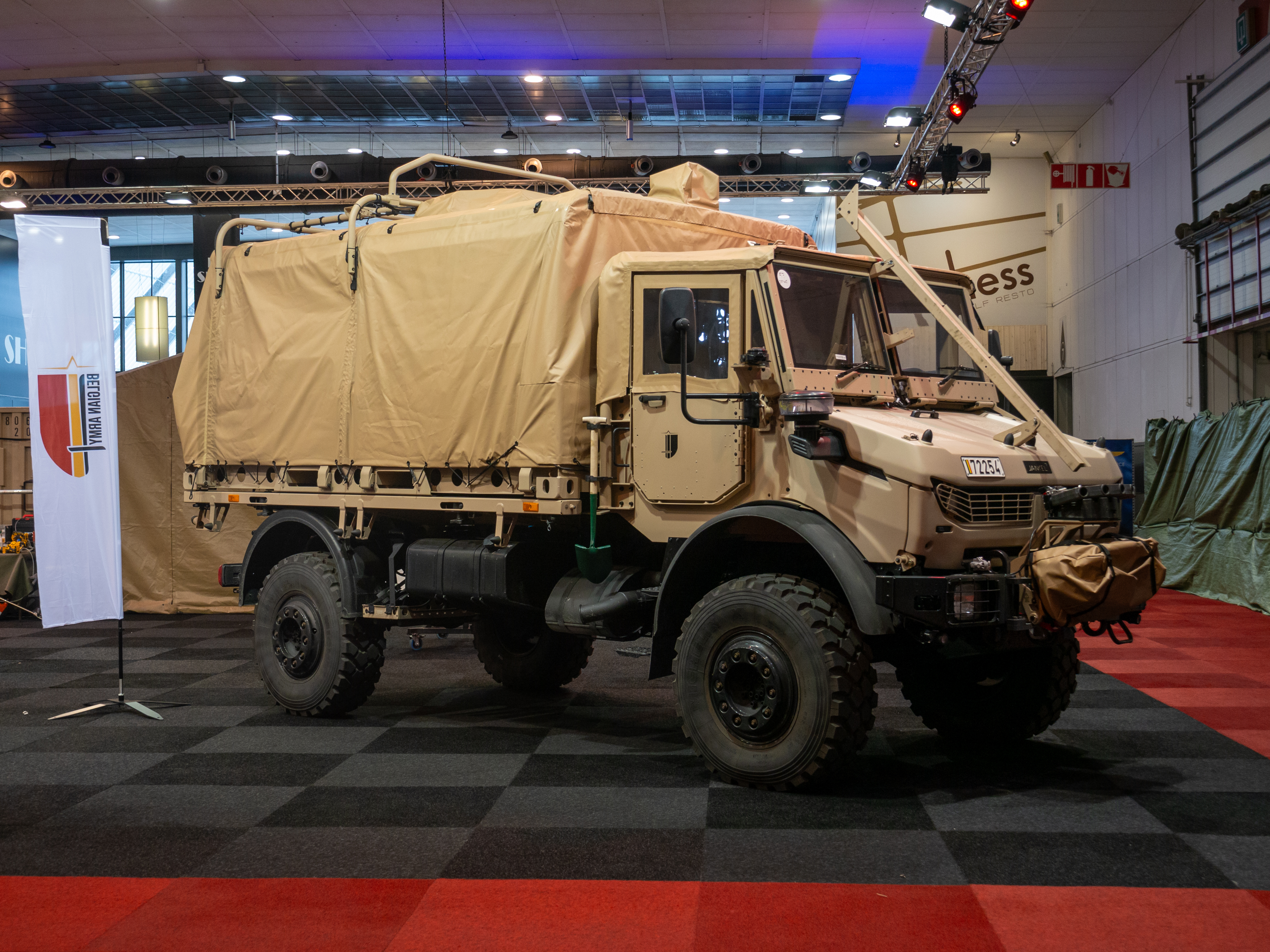
A 2022 model of Jankel Light Transport Tactical Vehicle used by Special Forces Group (Belgium)

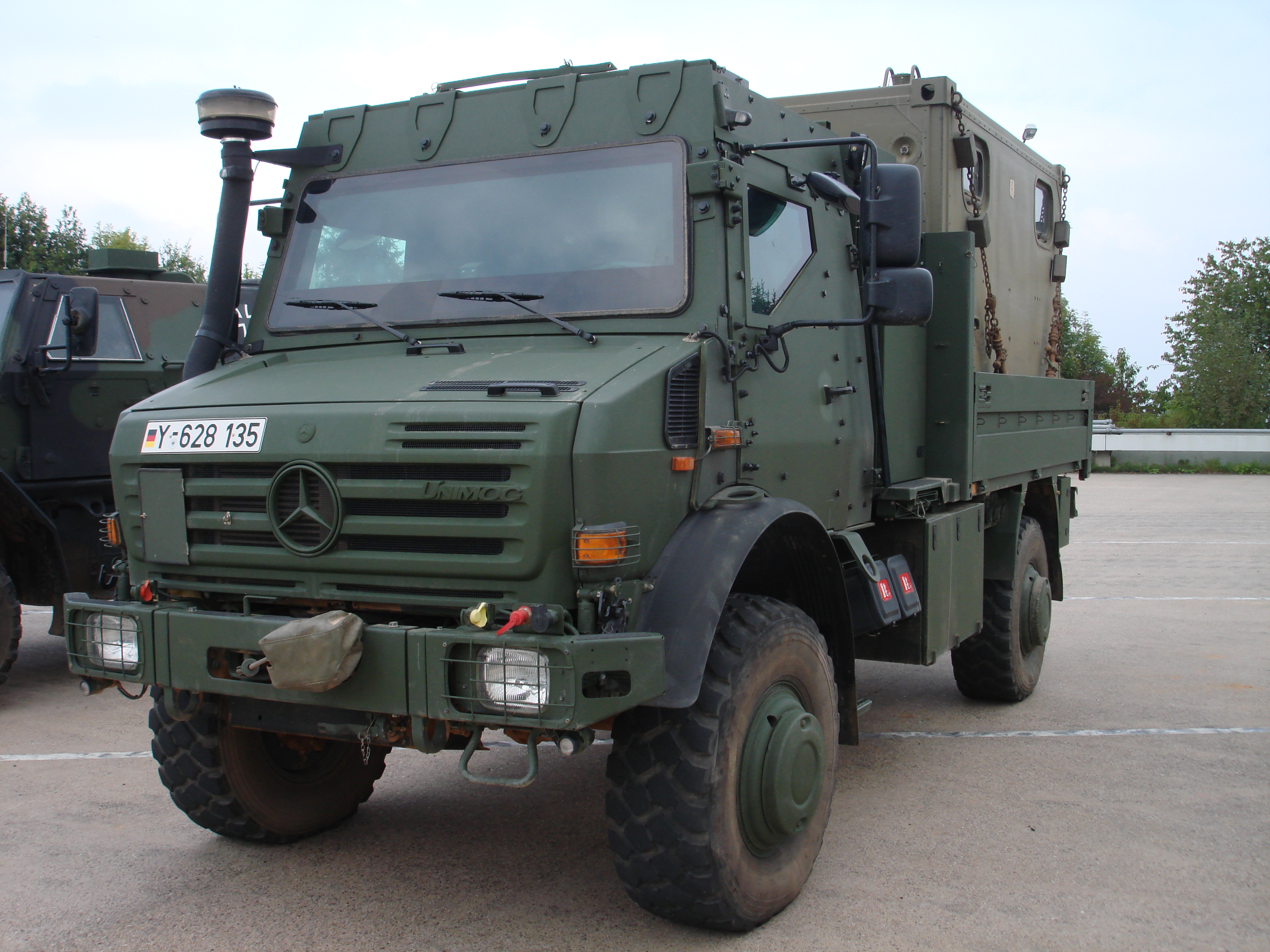
A Unimog U5000 of the German Army with an armoured cabin.

=== Civilian ===
Unimogs are used by the German emergency management agency Technisches Hilfswerk (THW),(literally Technical Relief Organization), by fire departments and municipalities as utility vehicles. They can be used as material handlers, auxiliary power providers (generators), and equipment carriers. Their ability to operate off-road, in high water, or mud, makes it easier to access remote areas in emergency situations. They are commonly used in snow removal where other vehicles might not be able to operate. Many Alpine towns and districts are equipped with one or more Unimog snow blowers to clear narrow mountain roads that have drifted closed.

In construction, Unimogs are used as carriers of equipment and, with the optional extended cabin, also of workers. They can be equipped with a backhoe, front loader, or other contracting equipment. On railroads, Unimogs are used as rail car movers and road-rail vehicles. They have also been used in mining areas, like seen in Gold Bridge, BC, Canada.

In agriculture, Unimogs are used to operate farm equipment. While most farm field implement operations are now performed by a tractor, Unimogs are used to haul produce, machinery and animals. They are also used around the farmyard to run chippers, grain augers, and conveyors.

Unimogs are also used as a prime mover, to pull heavy trailers, large wheeled conveyances and jet airliners. Often, only the front half, (an OEM part), is combined with a tailor-made rear.

Unimogs are used as tourist transport for jungle ecotourism or safaris.

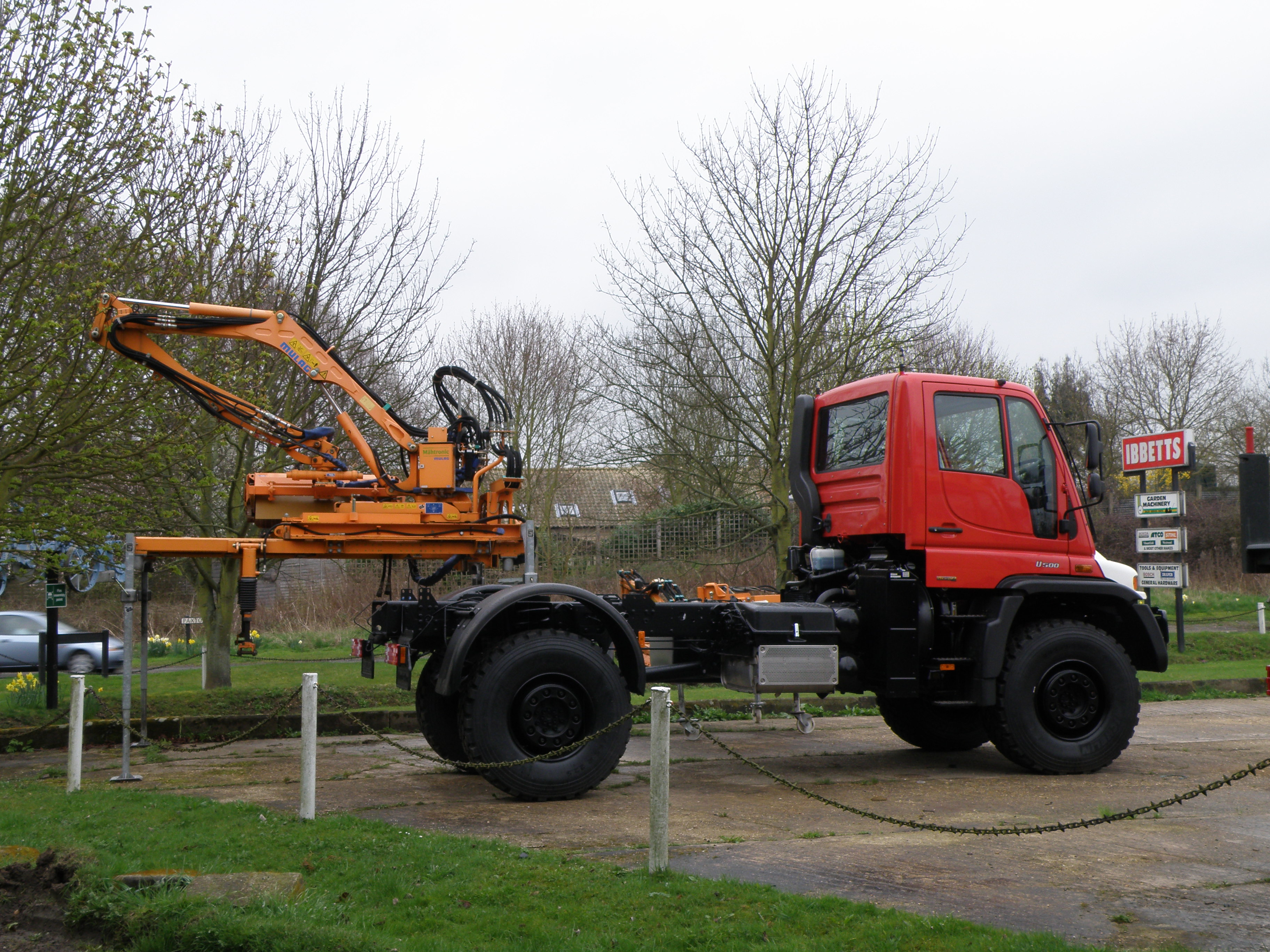
The modular design offers attachment capabilities for various different implements. Here shown with a flail hedge and verge trimmer implement used in agroforestry.

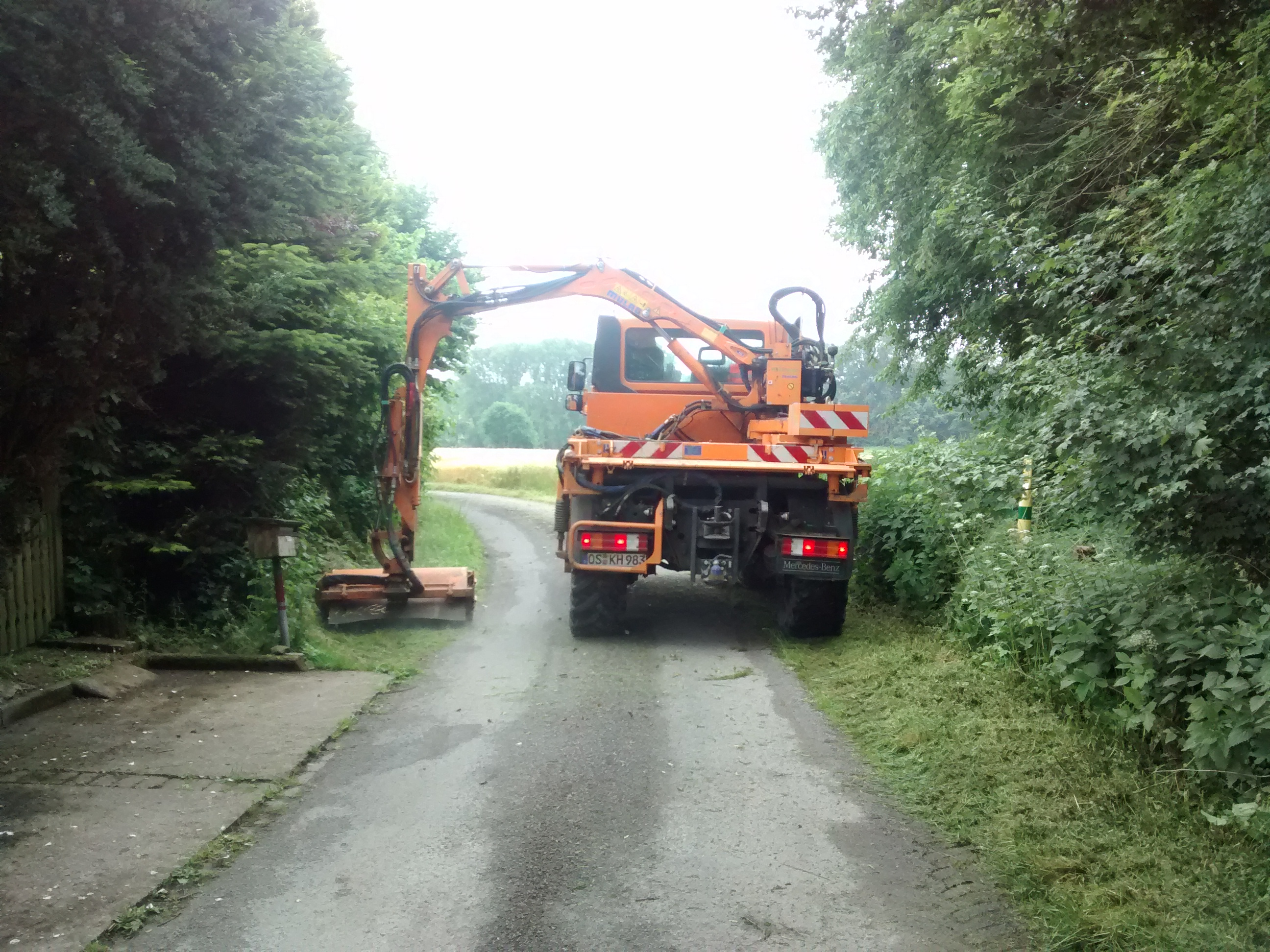
Unimog mowing in Germany

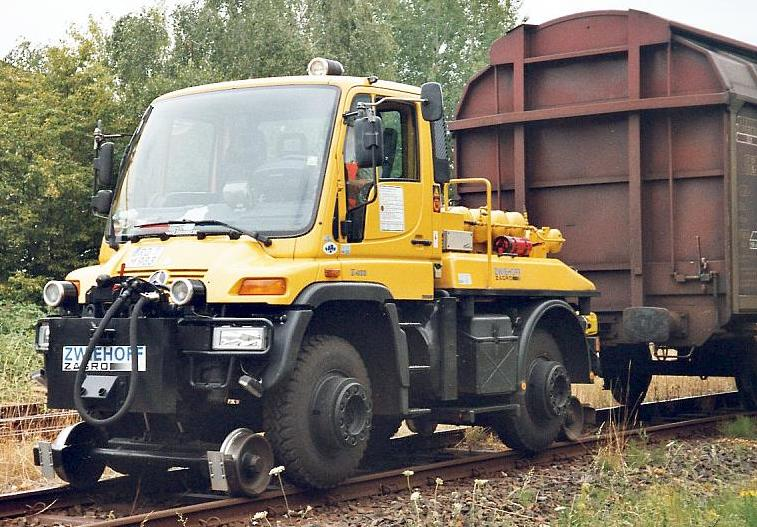
Unimog 405/UGN road-rail vehicle used as a rail car mover

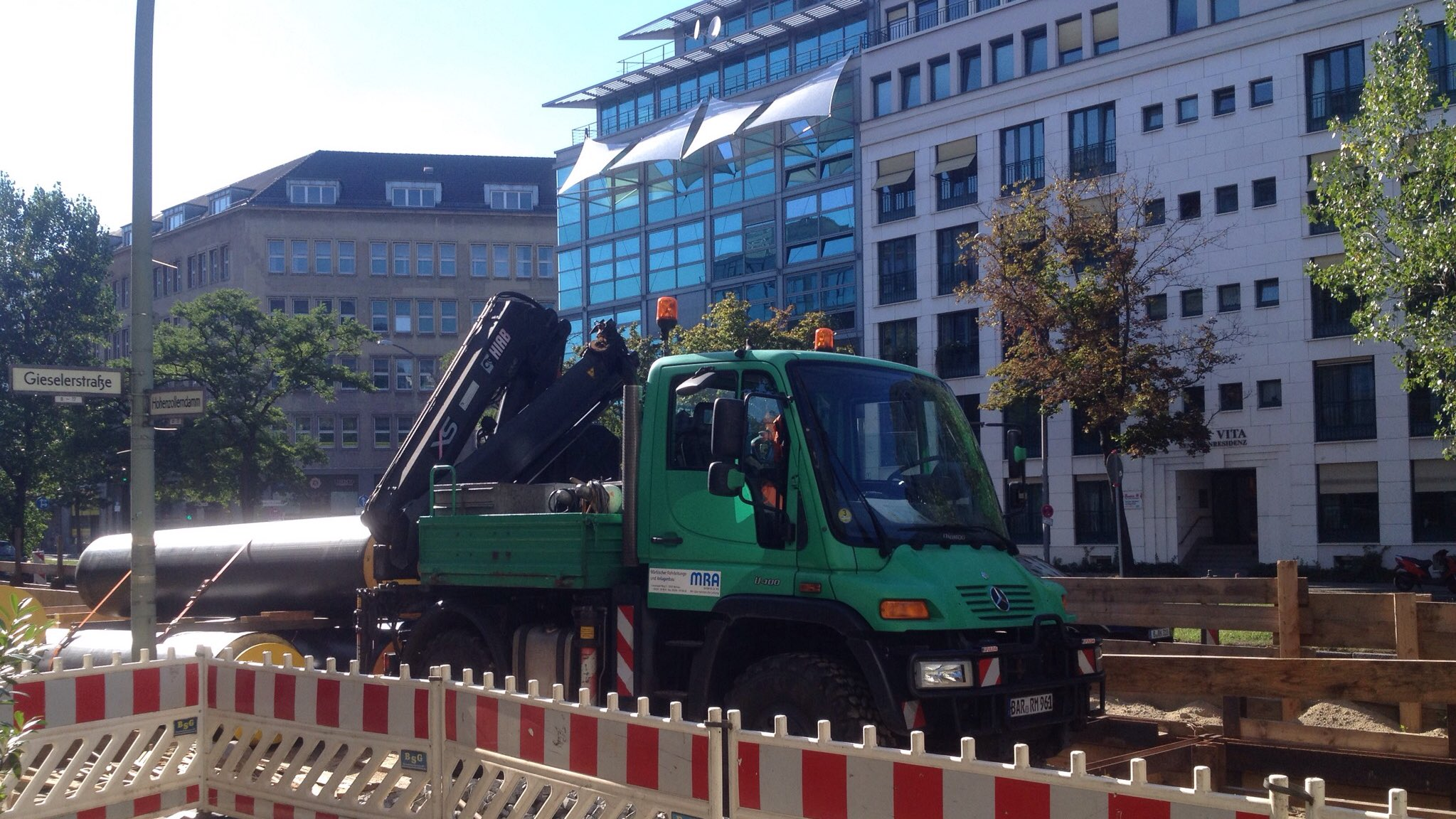
Unimog 405/UGN with HIAB crane used at a construction site

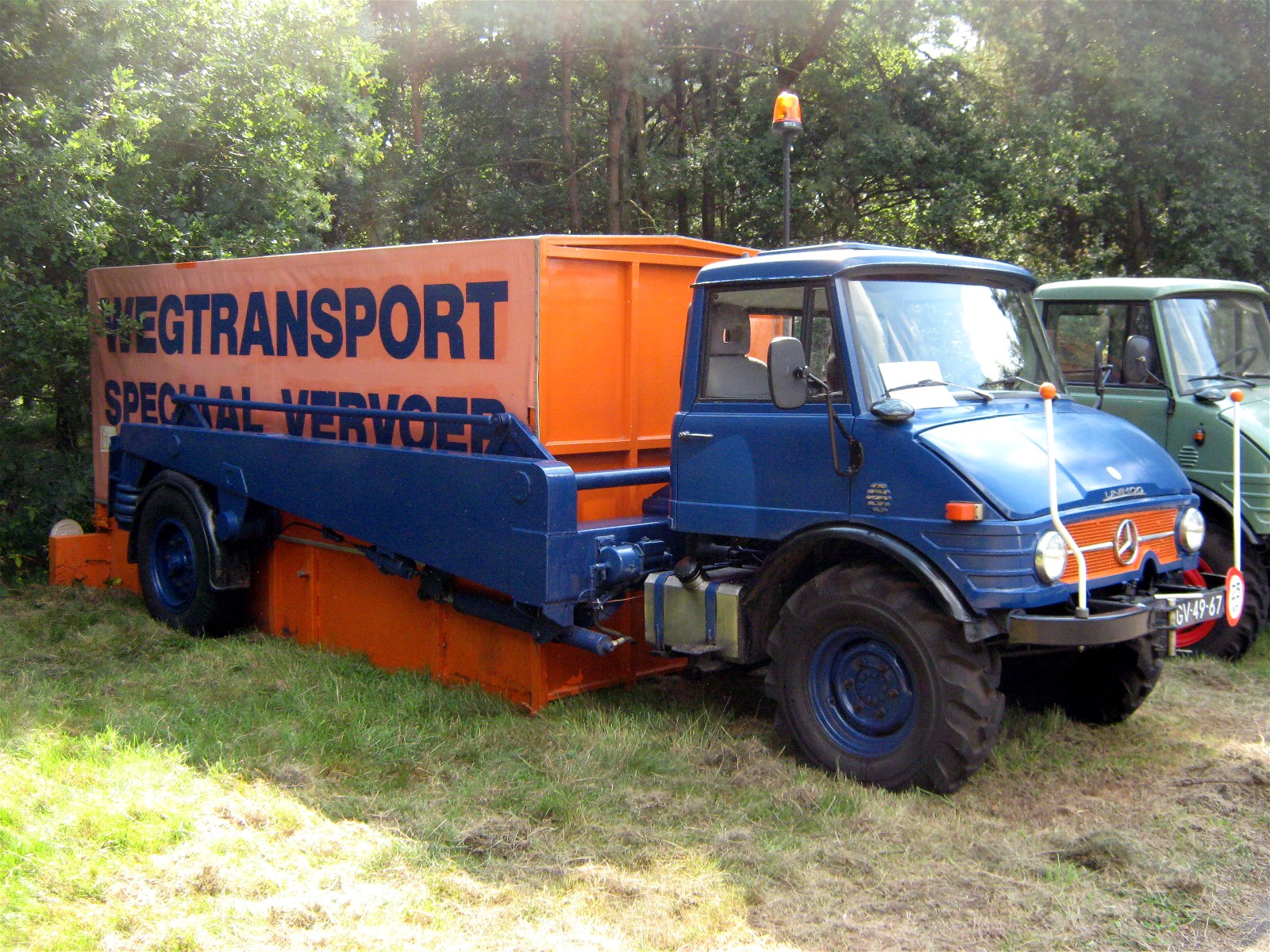
Unimog 406 "front half" OEM part made vehicle for moving 20' containers

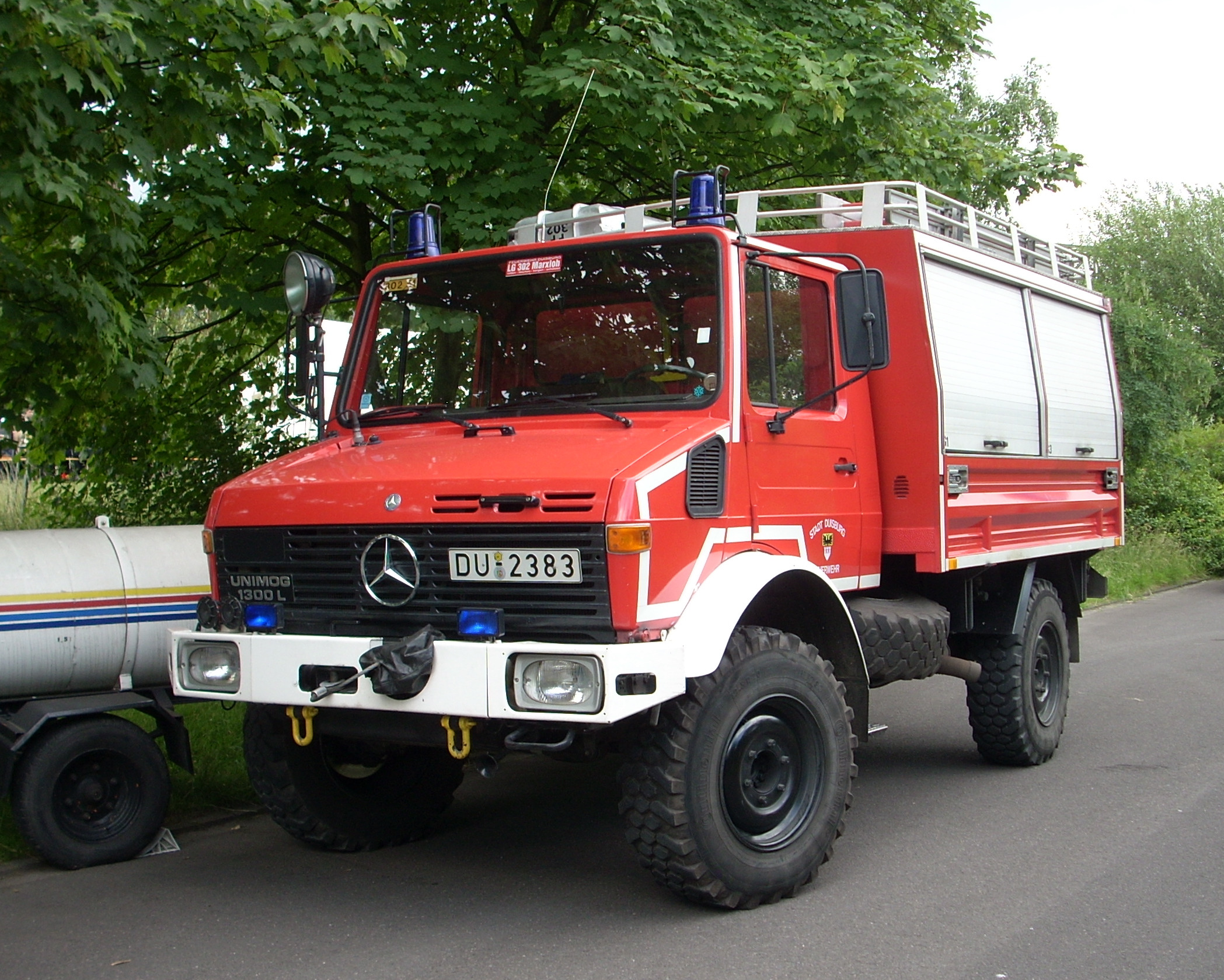
Technical rescue fire engine RW1, a common Unimog-based fire engine in Germany, based on the Unimog 435.115 (U 1300 L)

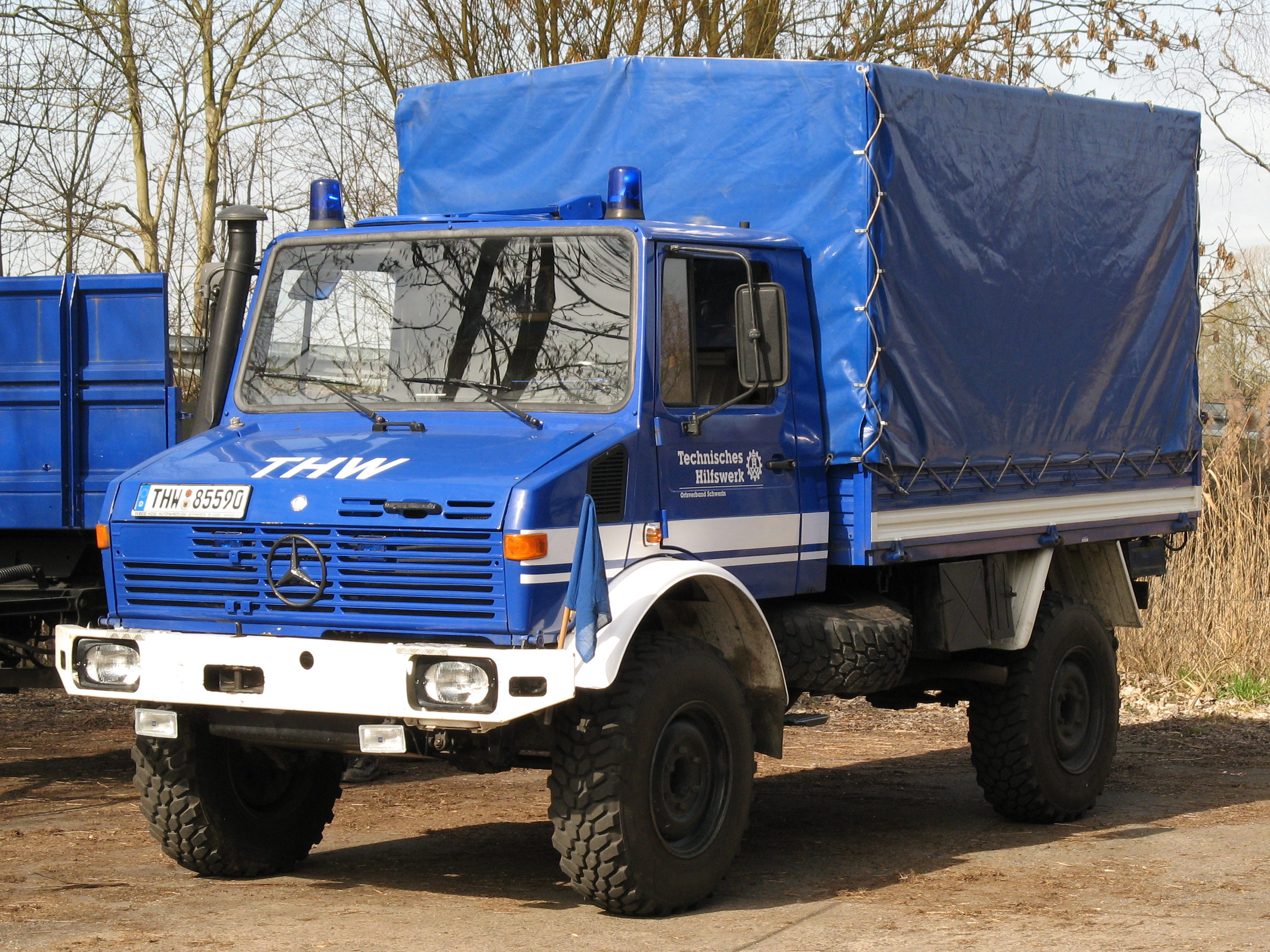
Crew lorry MLW 2 of the THW, based on the Unimog 437 (U 4000)

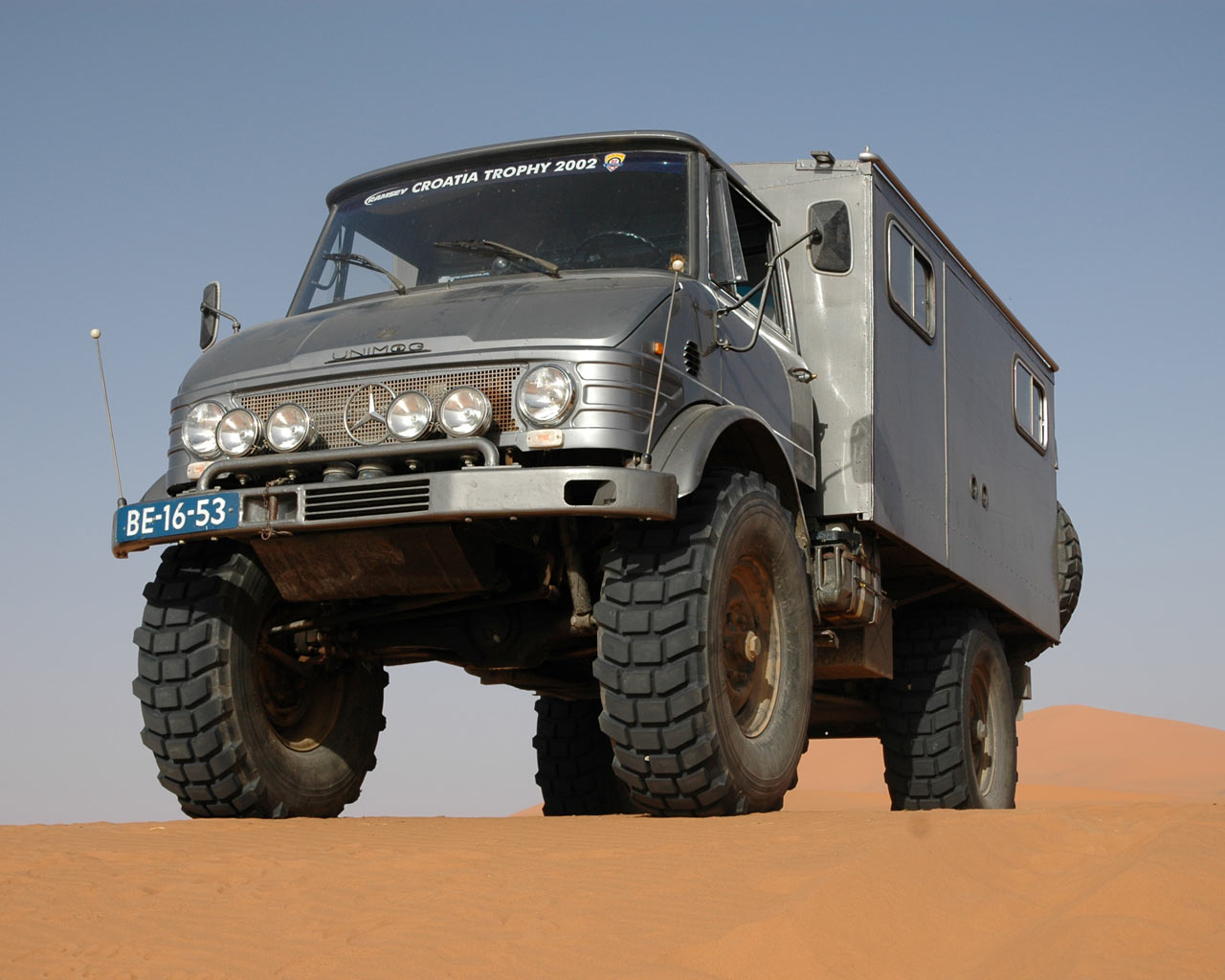
Unimog 404 used as mobile home in the Dunes of Erg Chebbi in Morocco. Note the high ground clearance due to portal gear axles

=== North America ===
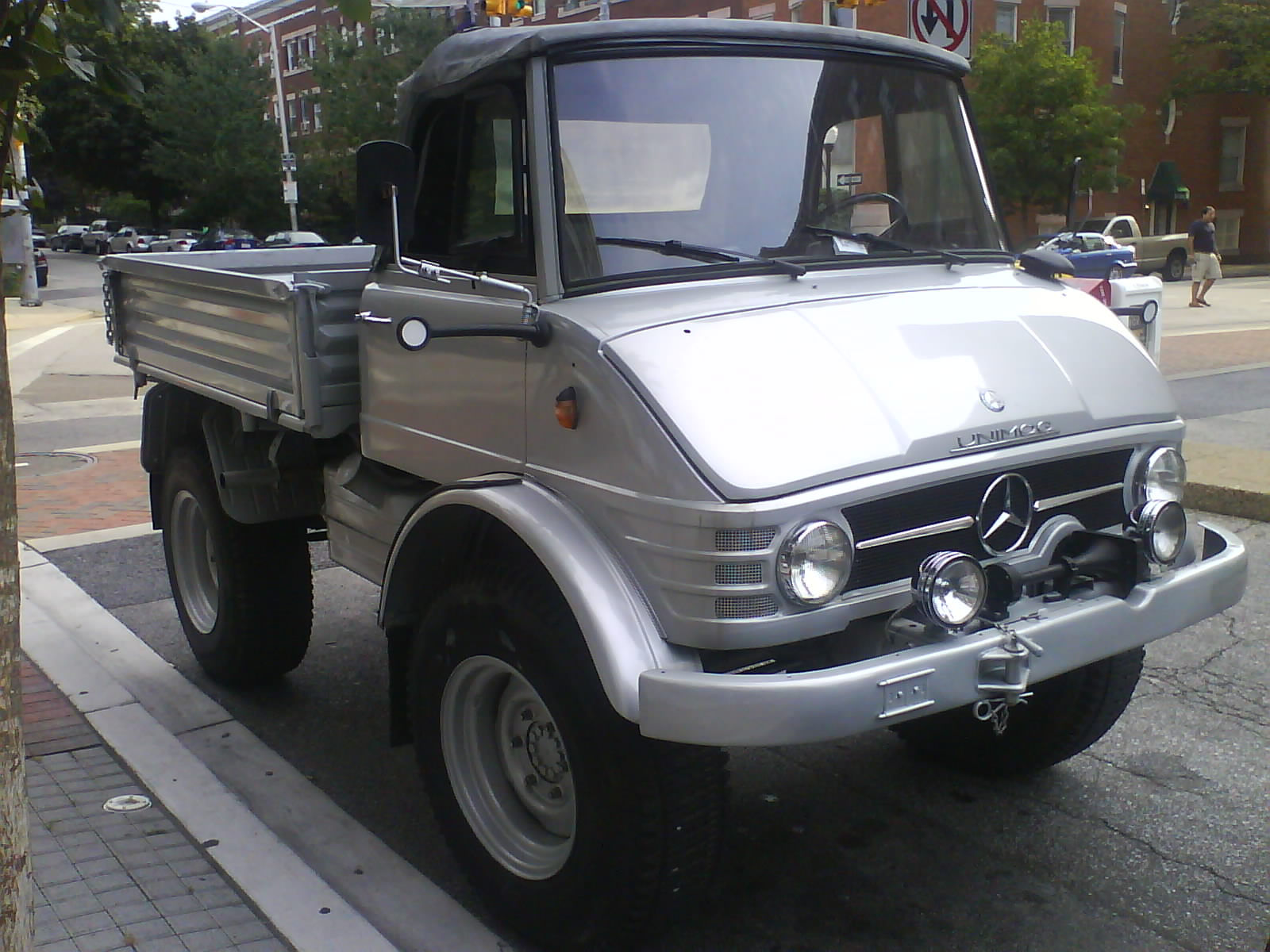
Unimog pickup in Baltimore, Maryland

Unimogs have been uncommon in North America because of differing vehicle regulations and requirements from those in Germany, and due to the lack of a North American sales and support network. Most Unimog models found in North America have been imported by individual dealers or independent enthusiasts.

Between 1975 and 1980 the Case Corporation (now merged into CNH Global) imported the U-900 model into the United States and sold it through Case tractor dealerships as the MB4/94.

In 2002 DaimlerChrysler tried to re-enter the North American market with the Unimog and engaged in four years of aggressive marketing, which included activities such as; truck and trade shows, exposure on the television show Modern Marvels, numerous magazine articles and extensive demonstrations (both touring and on an individual basis). They were generally sold through Freightliner truck dealerships. Freightliner is a Daimler AG subsidiary. The UGN series was specifically manufactured for the North American market and was significantly different mechanically from its European counterpart. The UGN faced stiff competition in North America by manufacturers whose truck or equipment lines performed some of the same duties as the Unimog. Some of them are Caterpillar, John Deere, AM General, Sterling Trucks (also a Daimler AG subsidiary), and General Motors. After five years and selling only 184 Unimogs, Freightliner LLC exited the market. Daimler AG cited non-compliance with EPA07 emission requirements as the main reason for ceasing North American sales.

=== Motorsport ===
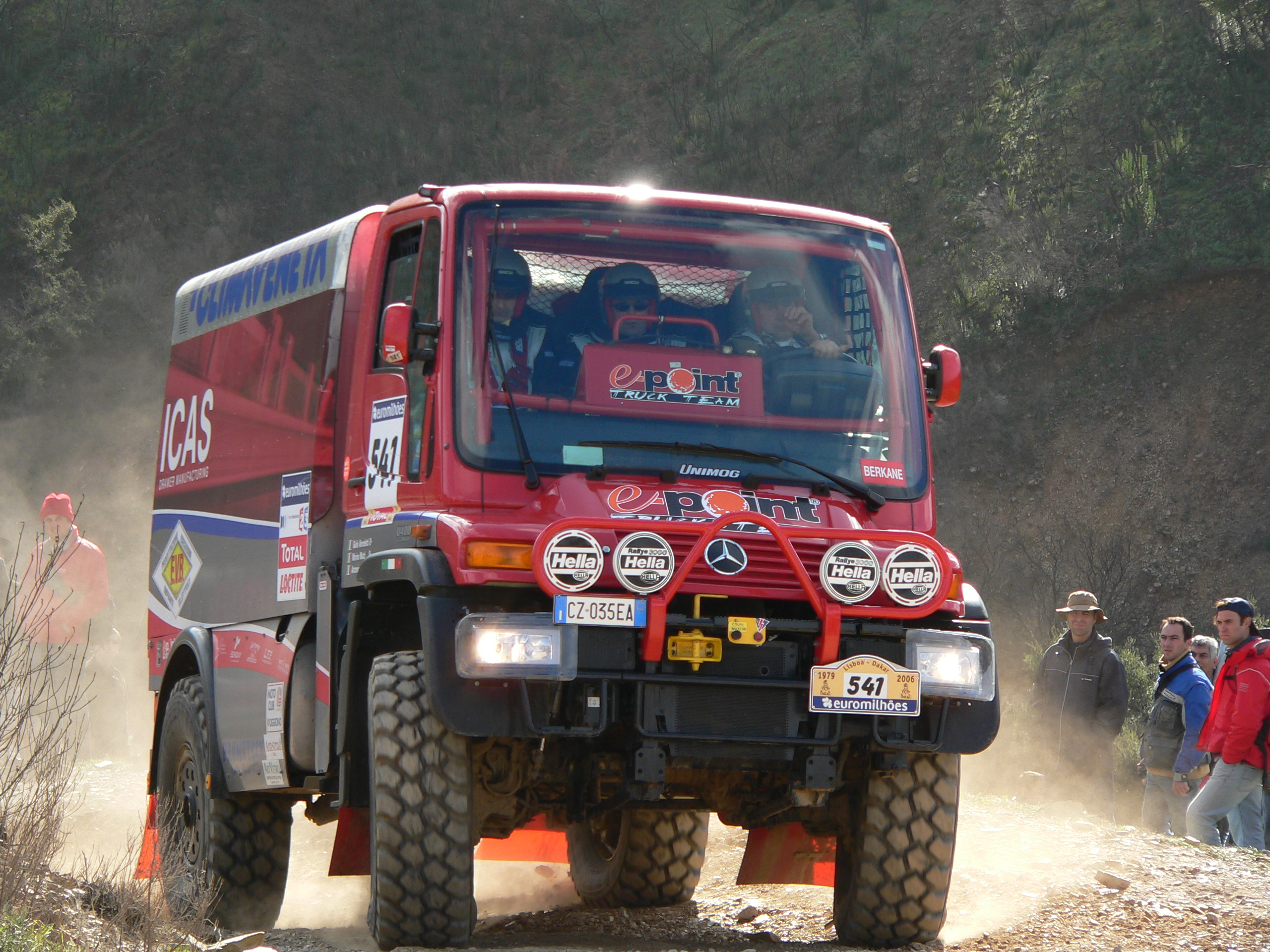
Unimog in the 2006 Dakar Rally

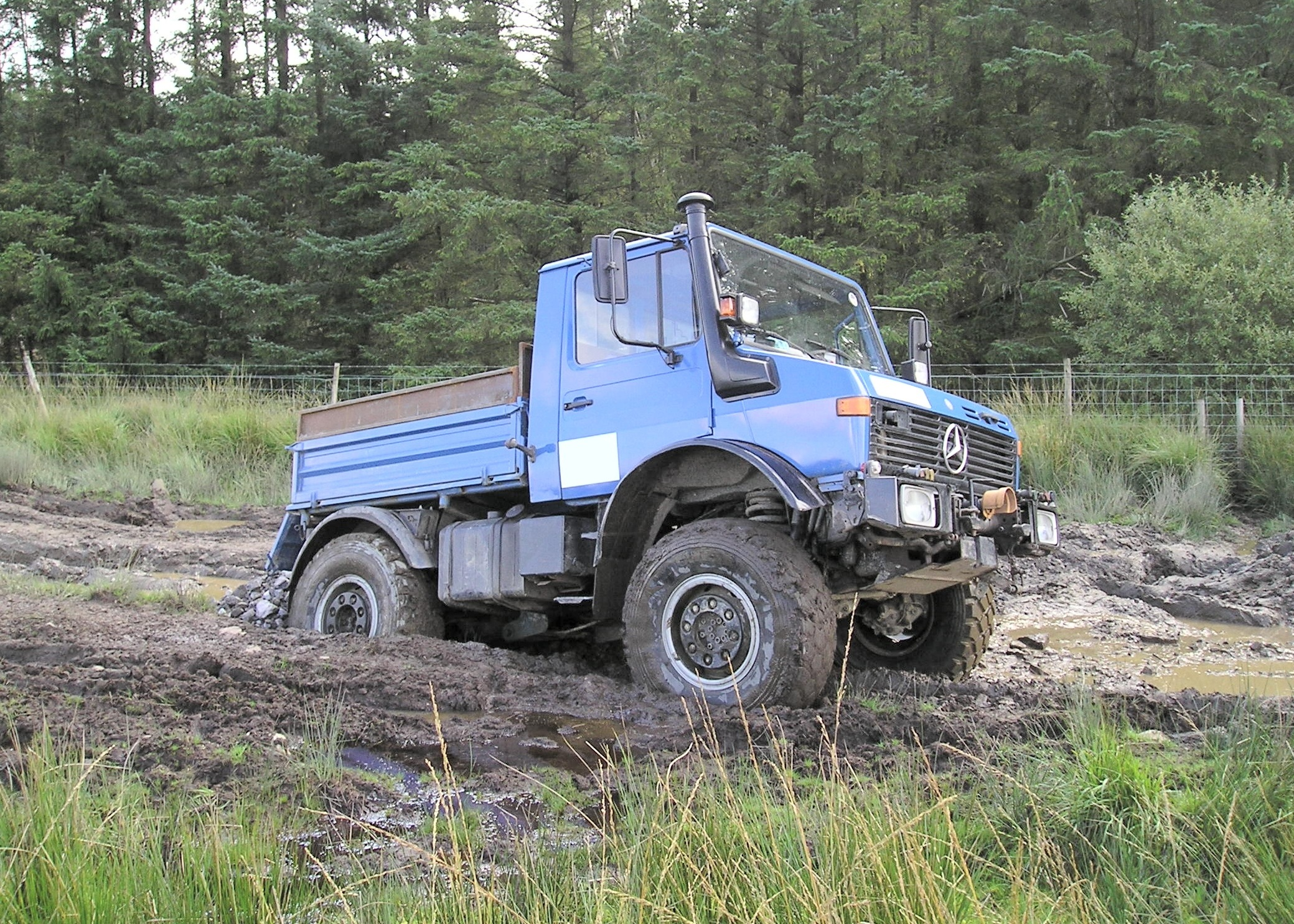
Mud bogging Unimog 427

Unimogs have been used in three kinds of competition: Dakar Rally and other desert rally competitions, mud bogging, and slow-moving Truck Trials over obstacles.

Unimogs have won the truck class of the Dakar in 1982 and 1986, the latter an unexpected victory as the vehicle participated for Honda, primarily to provide support for the motorcycles of the team. High-powered factory-sponsored entries of truck companies aiming for the overall win have since taken the laurels, with Unimogs used mainly for service purposes.

== Derivatives ==
=== MB-trac ===
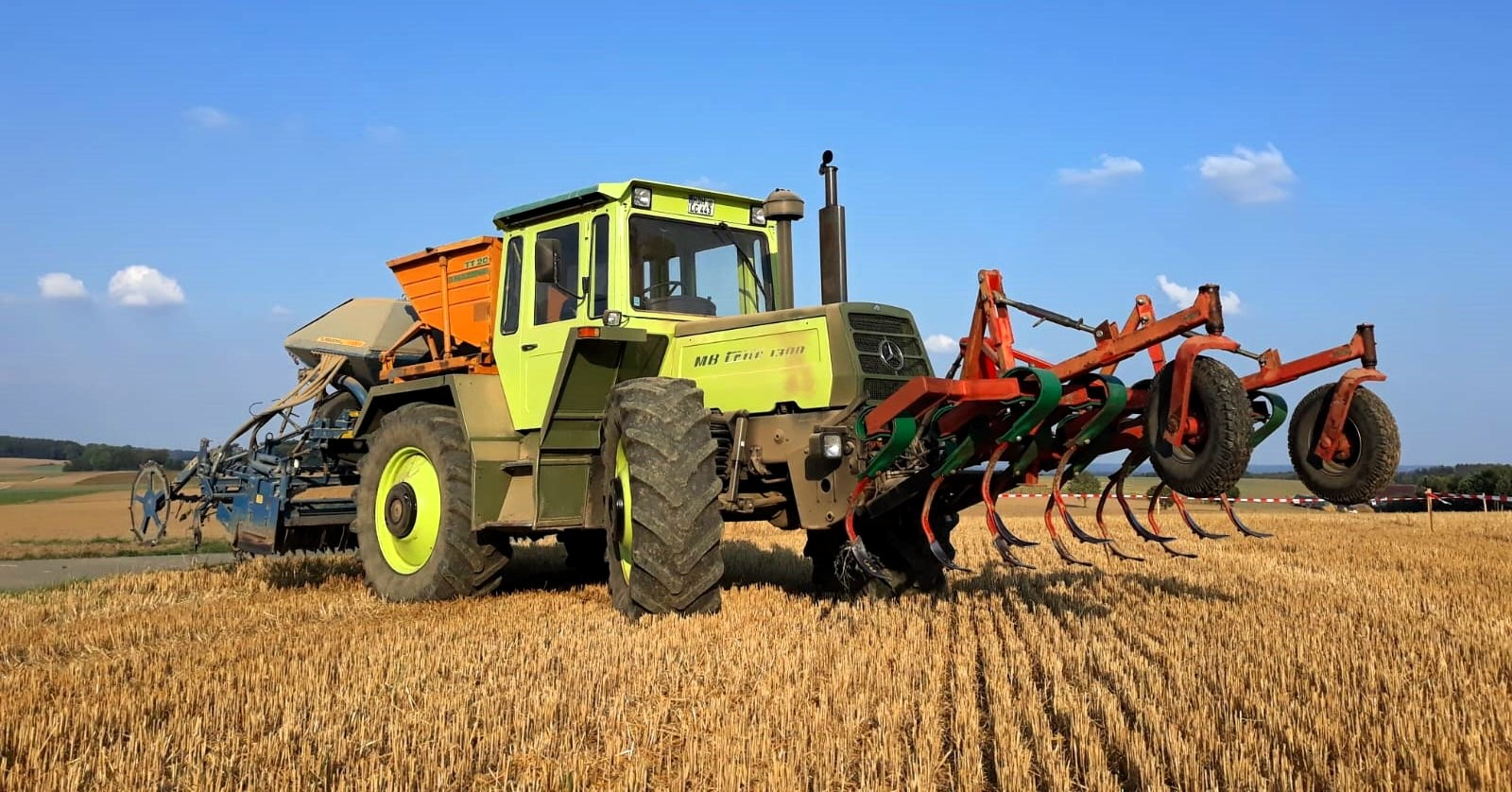
MB-trac 1300

In 1968 the Unimog department in Gaggenau began development of the MB-trac, a tractor based on the Unimog 403 drivetrain. It was produced by Daimler-Benz from 1973 to 1991.

=== Military derivatives ===
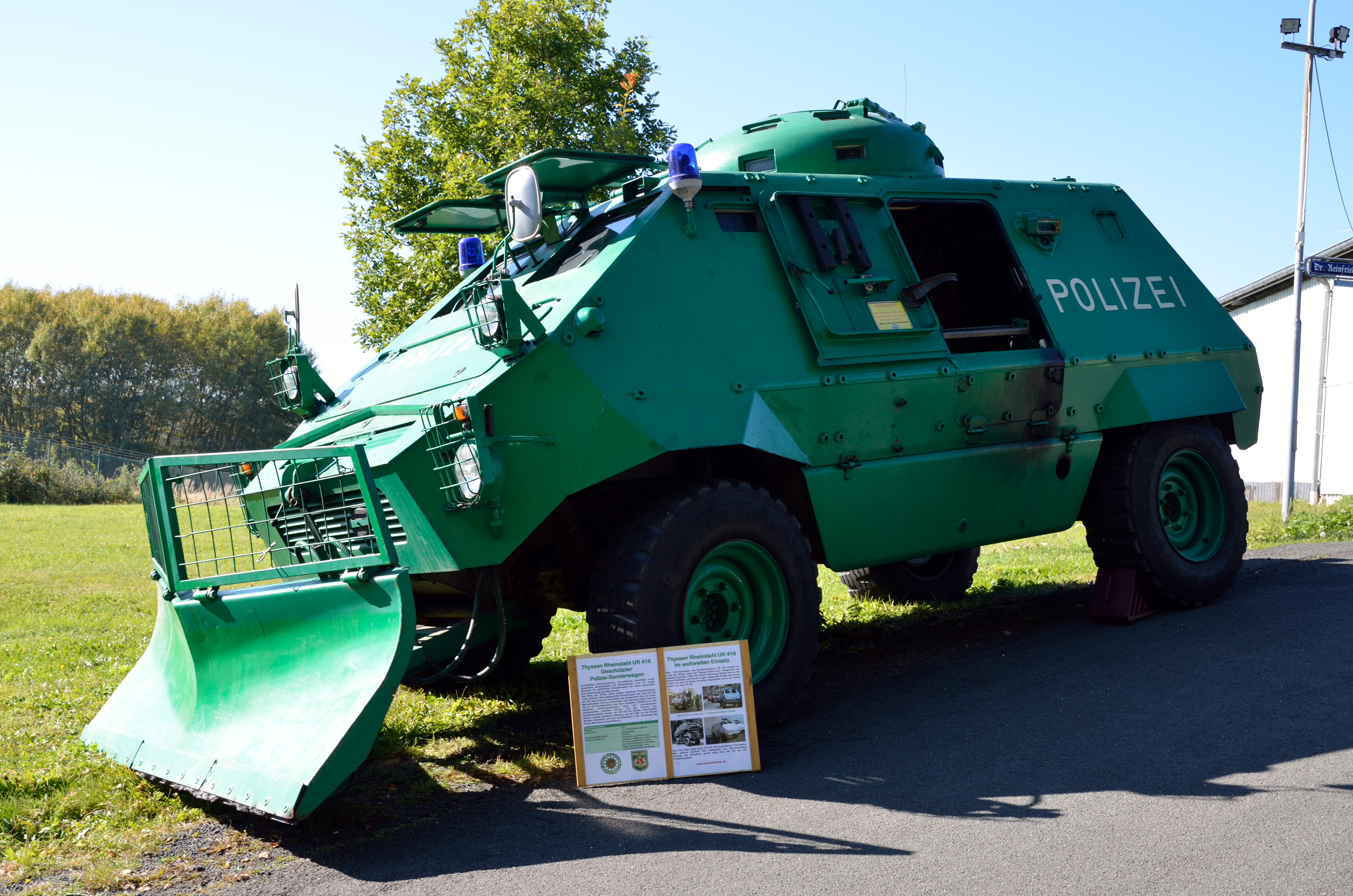
UR-416, a police vehicle based on a Unimog 416 chassis.

The Unimog also serves as a technical platform for armoured vehicles like the ATF Dingo, a mine-protected utility and reconnaissance vehicle used by the German and other European Armed Forces (e.g. Belgium) for territorial defence purposes as well as in international missions.

In late Autumn 1956, Daimler-Benz started developing a new military version of the Unimog, the Unimog SH. It was based on the Unimog S and had a rear engine (German: Heckmotor), hence the name Unimog SH. Until 1960, Daimler-Benz completed 24 Unimog SH and sent them to AB Landsverk for final assembly. Initially, the Belgian Army intended to purchase these vehicle for their police forces in the Belgian Congo, but only 9 vehicles were actually sold to the Belgian forces; the 15 remaining vehicles were purchased by the Irish Army in 1972. They were intended as a stop-gap vehicle for use until the first Panhard M3 VTT APCs entered service in 1972. The type had excellent off-road capability but poor on-road handling due to a high centre of gravity and several accidents occurred as a result. A four-man dismountable squad was carried, but space was cramped, and in any case a four-man detachment was far too small for any sort of realistic military purpose. Other considerations were that the FN MAG gunner's position was too exposed. Eventually the Unimog Scout Cars arrived in Ireland in February 1972, their departure having been delayed by a local peace group who thought they were destined for the Provisional Irish Republican Army (PIRA). By mid-1978 all had been transferred to the Irish Army Reserve, the FCA. All were withdrawn by 1984, and two are preserved; one in the transport museum in Howth Co Dublin and one in the Muckleburgh Collection, England.

An updated version of the Unimog SH, the Unimog T was made for the German Bundeswehr in 1962. The German defence ministry decided not to purchase the Unimog T, which is why it was never put into series production. Further armoured vehicles developed in Germany using Unimog chassis are the UR-416, the Sonderwagen 4 and Condor 1 in Police service, and the ATF Dingo used by the Bundeswehr in Afghanistan. The French Aravis mine-protected vehicle, like the Dingo, based on the Special Chassis FGA 12.5. The Buffel, Mamba, RG-31, and RG-33 armoured personnel carriers from South Africa are based upon the Unimog driveline. The AV-VBL developed by Brazil's Tectran is also an AFV family based on the Unimog.

== History ==
=== 1940s ===
==== 1945 – First prototype ====
Original Boehringer-era logo from the 1940's

Originally, the Unimog was developed in post-war Germany to be used as agricultural equipment. It was designed with equal-sized wheels, a mounting bracket in front, a hitch in the rear, and loading space in the center. This was to make it a multi-purpose vehicle that farmers could use in the field and on the highway. Albert Friedrich was granted permission to develop the Unimog in November 1945, and entered a production agreement with Erhard und Söhne (Erhard and Sons) in Schwäbisch Gmünd on 1 December 1945. Development began on 1 January 1946. Soon after, Heinrich Rößler, the Unimog lead designer, joined the development team. The first prototype was ready by the end of 1946. The early prototypes were equipped with the M 136 Otto engine, because the development of the OM 636 Diesel engine had not been finished. The prototypes were similar to the later series production models. The original track width of 1.270 m (4 ft 2 in) was equivalent to two potato rows.

==== 1947 – Production ====
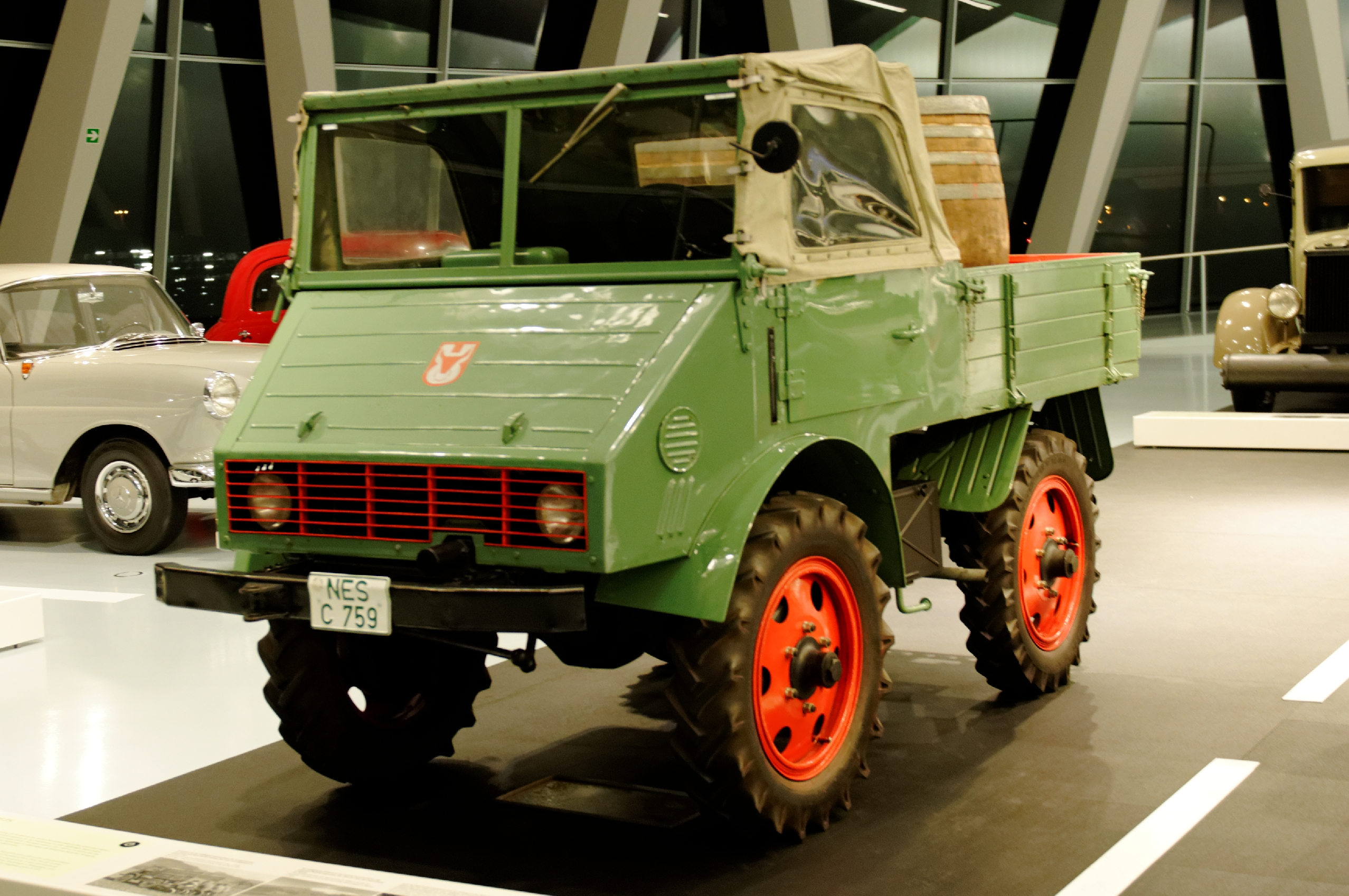
1948 Boehringer Unimog 70200

The 25-PS (18 kW) OM 636 Mercedes-Benz Diesel engine became standard equipment in the first production Unimogs at the end of 1947. The original emblem for the Unimog was a pair of ox horns in the shape of the letter U. The first 600 units of the 70200 series Unimogs were built by Boehringer. This was done mainly for two reasons: Erhard und Söhne did not have the capacity to build the Unimogs and Boehringer (a former tool manufacturer) could evade dismantling.

=== 1950s ===
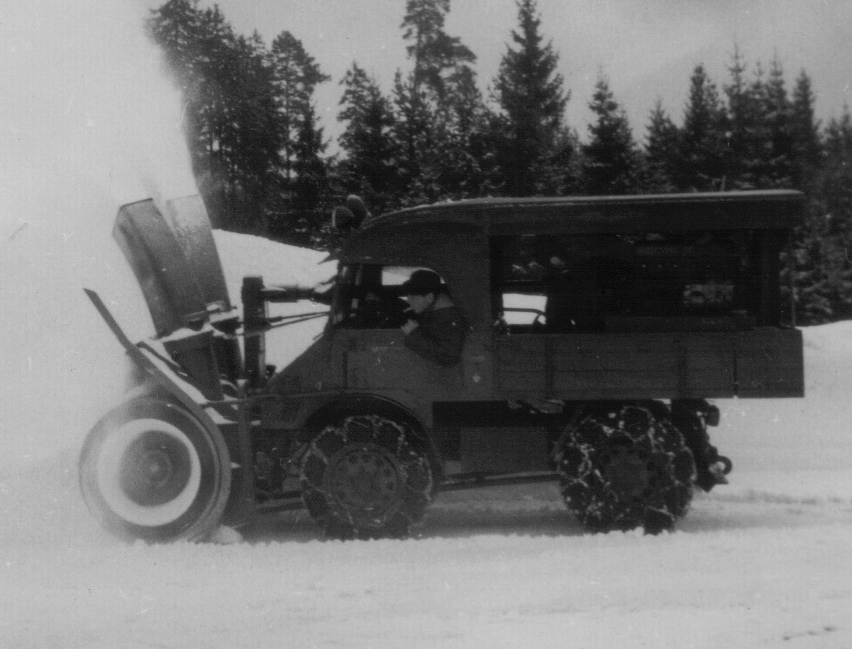
Unimog 401 with snow blower, c. 1955

In late 1950, Mercedes-Benz entered into a contract with Boeringer to take over production of the Unimog.

==== 1951 – Daimler-Benz – Gaggenau manufacturing plant ====
Daimler-Benz modified the Unimog for mass production to create the series 2010 and in 1951, started its manufacture in their Gaggenau plant in Baden-Württemberg, where production continued until 2002.

==== 1953 – The 401, 402 and the closed cab ====
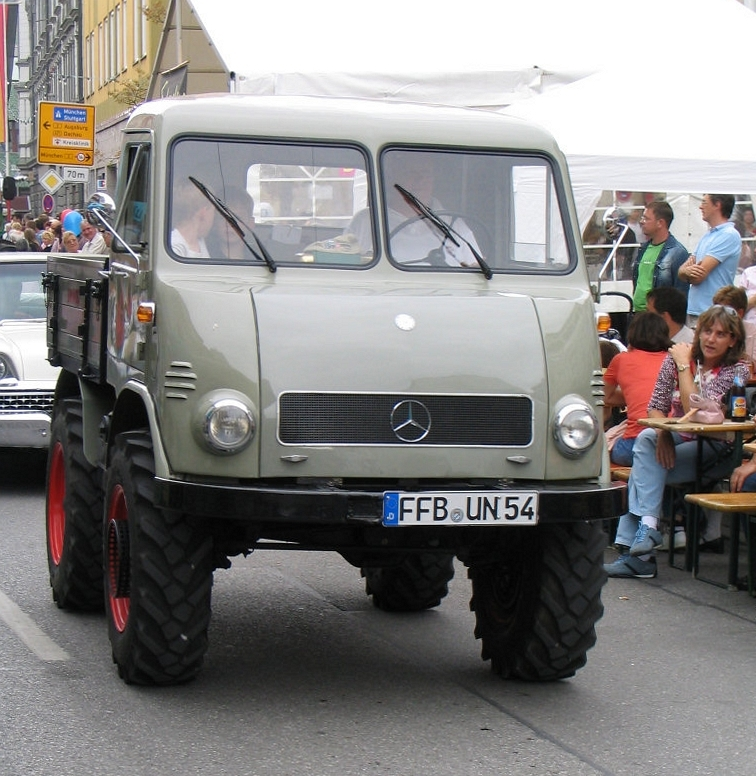
Unimog 401 with a Westfalia Typ B cab, 1954

In 1953, the Unimog was updated and the three-pointed Mercedes star began to appear on the bonnet, replacing the Unimog ox horn emblem. The new model became known as the series 401. A new series 402 with a long wheelbase chassis (2,120 mm (83 in) instead of 1,720 mm (68 in)) also became available.

An enclosed driver's cab was available as an option from 1953, making the Unimog a true all-weather vehicle.

==== 1955 – The 404 S ====
In 1955, the first Unimog 404 S series were produced. The primary customer of the 404 S was the Bundeswehr (literally Federal Defence, i.e. the West German Armed Forces), which was created in the mid-1950s in the era of the Cold War.

The 404 was intended to be a mobile cross-country truck, instead of an agricultural implement. The 404 S is the most popularly produced variant. 64,242 units were produced between 1955 and 1980. The oldest 404 known to exist is the first 1953 prototype, located in an East German museum.

==== 1957 ====
Starting in 1957, the Unimog 411 was offered with a synchromesh gearbox as an option, and in 1959, the synchromesh gearbox became standard.

=== 1960s ===
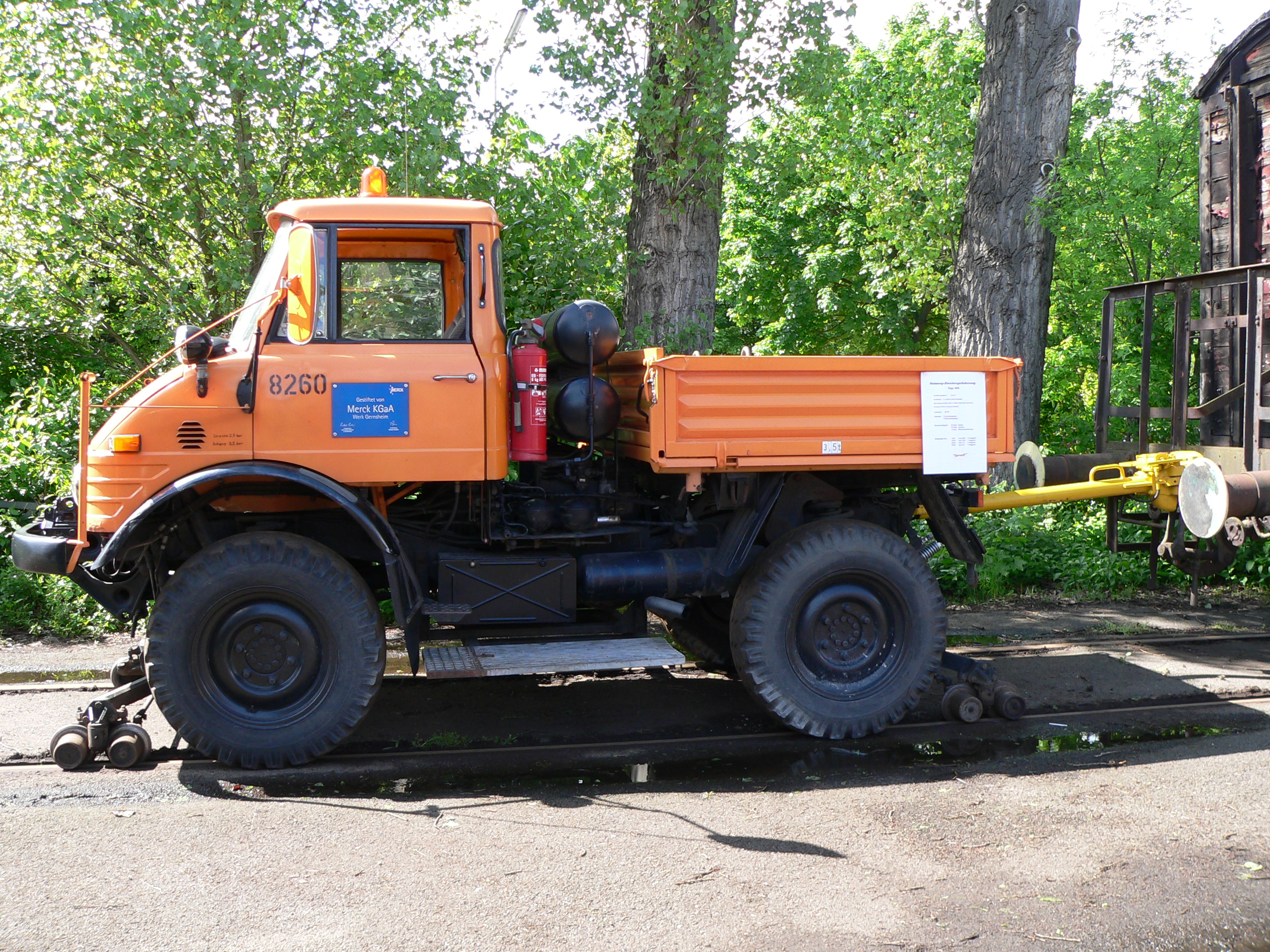
1971 model Unimog 406, as a Road–rail vehicle used for shunting (Rail car mover)

The 406/416 middle series were produced beginning in 1963. They were equipped with the six-cylinder pre-combustion chamber Diesel engine OM 312 producing 65 PS (48 kW; 64 hp). The 406 and 416 are similar, The 416 having a longer 2,900 mm (114 in) wheelbase compared to 2,380 mm (94 in) for the 406. Starting in 1964, the 406-series was equipped with the direct injected OM 352 Diesel engine starting with 65 PS (48 kW; 64 hp) and going up to 84 PS (62 kW; 83 hp) (110 PS (81 kW) for the Unimog 416).

Between the original Unimog and the middle series, Daimler-Benz developed a light series. The light series consisted of two separate Unimog series, the 421 and the 403. The 403, which basically is a 406-series with a 54 PS (40 kW; 53 hp) 3.8-litre four-cylinder engine, has a 2,380 mm (94 in) wheelbase and was later supplemented by the 413-series, which is a four-cylinder-version of the 416-series (long wheelbase (2,900 mm (114 in)) model). The 421 is the successor of the 411-series and has a 2,250 mm (89 in) wheelbase. It is powered by a 40 PS (29 kW; 39 hp) 2.2-litre passenger car Diesel engine.

The 100,000th Unimog (a 421) was built in 1966 in Gaggenau.

Argentina was the first country to manufacture the Unimog outside Germany. The first Unimog produced in the Mercedes-Benz Argentina S.A. factory in Gonzalez Catán, in the outskirts of Buenos Aires city, rolled off the assembly line on 1 September 1968.

The two models made in Argentina, are the 426 and 431. They are versions of the 416 respectively 431 produced under licence.

=== 1970s ===
==== 1972 – MB Trac ====
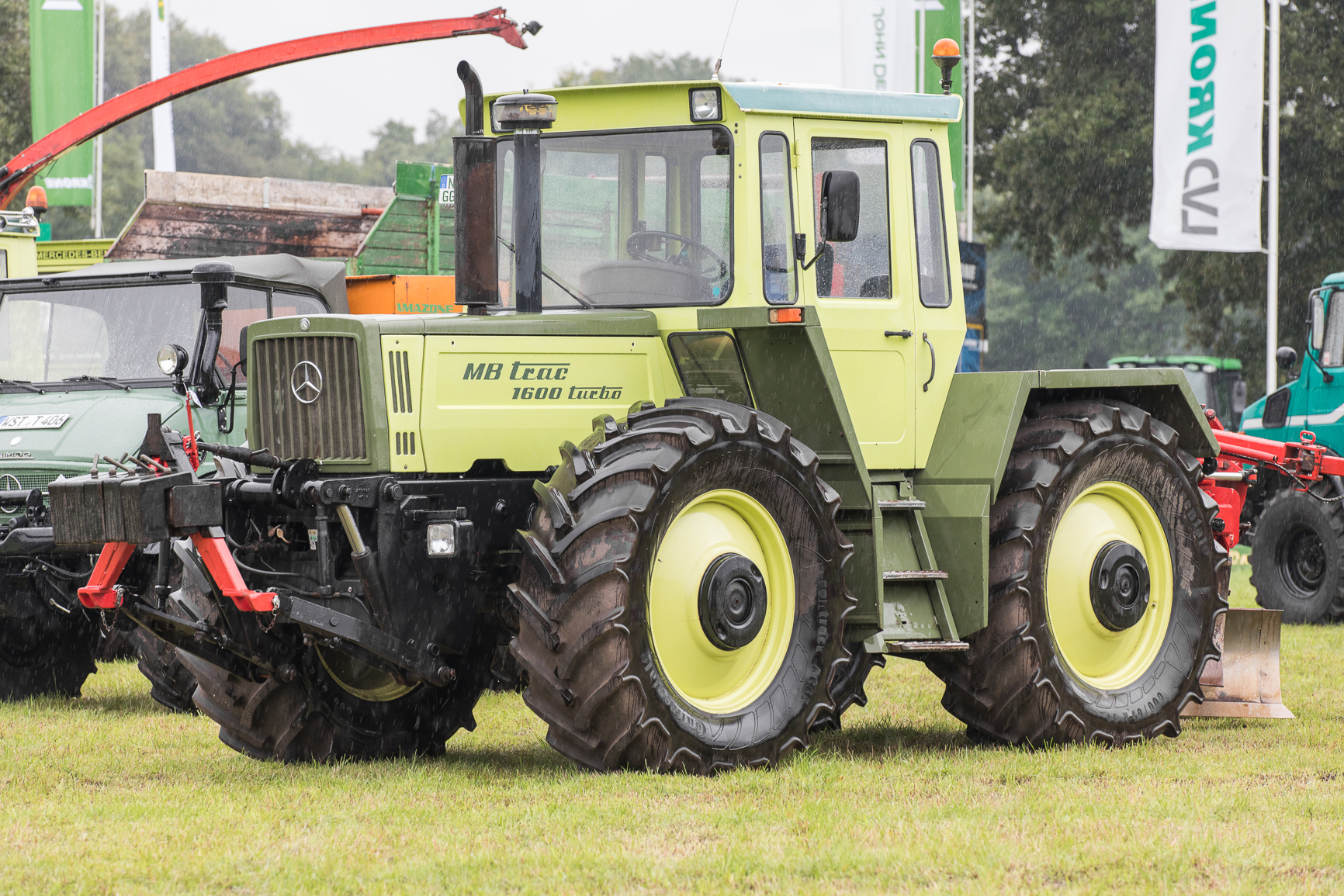
The MB-trac range of agricultural tractors produced from 1973 until 1991 by Daimler-Benz is based on the trac design principle and shares the Unimog's drivetrain. Pictured, 1600 turbo.

Despite originally being designed as an agricultural vehicle, the Unimog had more success as a multi-purpose tool carrier. To actually serve the agricultural market, Daimler-Benz designed a completely new agricultural tractor in 1972, the MB Trac. It is a body-on-frame design trac-tractor, has four big wheels of the same size, and all-wheel-drive, a slim bonnet, and an angular driver cab. In contrast to conventional tractors the cab is situated between the axles, similar to comparable four-wheel-drive tractors. There is no articulation between the front and rear sections, instead, the MB Trac has conventional steering.

A wide range of MB Trac tractors were offered, ranging from the entry model MB-trac 65 to the top model MB Trac 1800 intercooler. Daimler-Benz later merged the MB-trac with the agricultural machinery activities of Deutz AG. The manufacturing of the MB Trac series ceased in 1991.

==== 1974 – Heavy series ====
In 1974, Mercedes-Benz presented the new Unimog U 120. It was the first model of the "heavy duty" Unimog series 425. The heavy duty series, or simply "heavy" series, extended the Unimog model lineup. The characteristic "edgy" bonnet introduced with the heavy Unimog series remains a Unimog style element to this day.

The series 425 have a 2,810 mm (111 in) wheelbase, 9 t permissible maximum mass and an OM 352 Diesel engine producing 120 PS (88 kW; 120 hp) (shortly thereafter 125 PS (92 kW; 123 hp) as U 125).

==== 1975 – Series 435 ====
Manufacture of the series 435 for the Bundeswehr began in 1975, as a successor of the Unimog S 404. The 435 was characterized by a long wheelbase of 3,250 mm (128 in), 3,700 mm (146 in) or 3,850 mm (152 in) and shares its cab with the series 425.

==== 1976 – Unimog models renamed ====
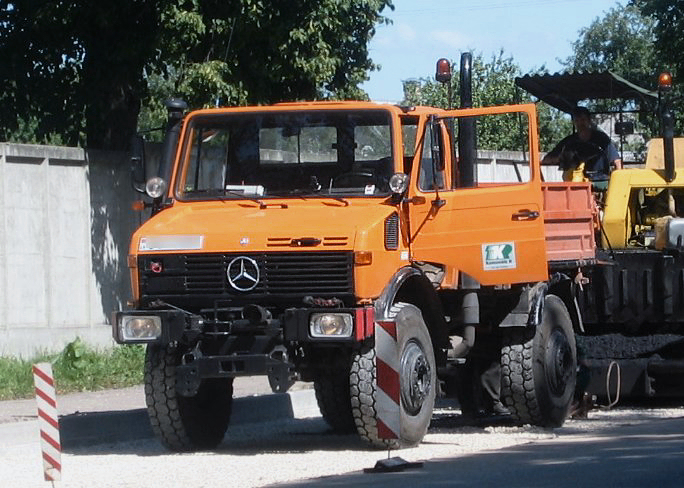
Unimog U 1300 (series 425) municipal truck in Rēzekne, Latvia

The new 424 "middle" series of Unimogs was produced starting from 1976. They share the cab with the series-425 and are designated U 1000, U 1300/L, U 1500, and U 1700/L with 124 kW (166 hp; 169 PS) engine performance.

In the same period Daimler-Benz re-ordered the type designations for the older series. The classical round form series of the Unimog were now designated U 600/L, U 800/L, U 900 and U 1100/L. (The letter L stands for a long wheelbase, because most models were available in two wheelbase variants.)

The Unimog with the rounded driving cab became known as the light series. The new series with angular cab was divided by payload into a middle and heavy series. Some engines overlap – the Unimog nomenclature is not simple to understand (see below for notes on series names).

The long-proven Unimog-S (404), although with clearly decreasing production figures, was the only Unimog with an Otto cycle engine in the lineup.

With the exception of the entry-level model, all Unimogs for 1976 were equipped with four wheel disc brakes.

==== 1977 – 200,000th Unimog ====
The 200,000th Unimog, a 424.121, was produced in 1977.

=== 1980s ===
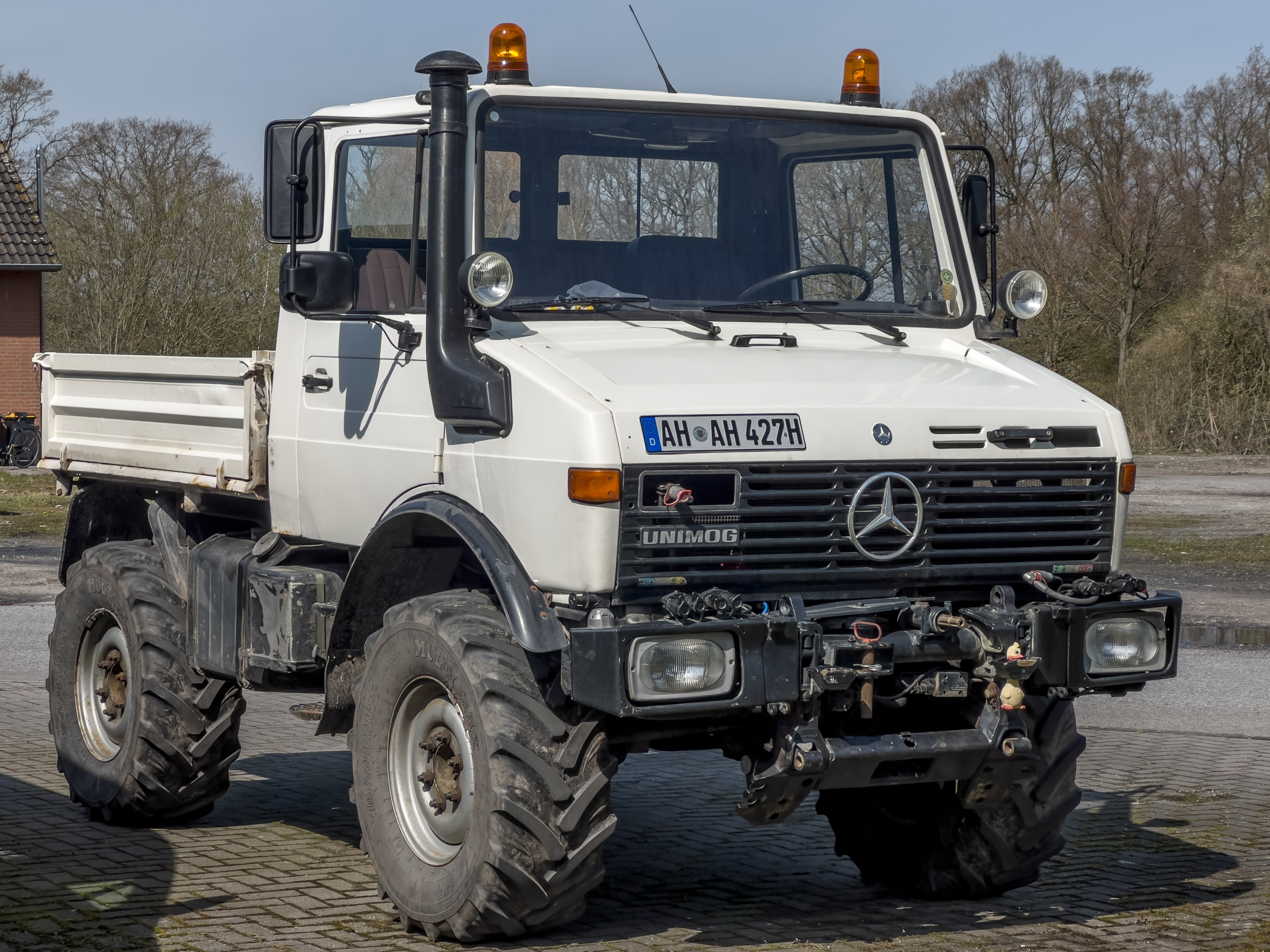
Unimog 427 short-wheelbase (2650 mm) tractor – the Unimog 427 was among the first Unimogs to be fitted with the 6-litre OM366 Diesel engine

In 1980, production of the U 404 (Unimog S) ended.

The light and medium series 407 and 427 were introduced in 1985.

Production of the 406 and 416 ceased in 1988 and the 437-series was introduced the same year.

=== 1990s ===
==== 1992 – New light models ====
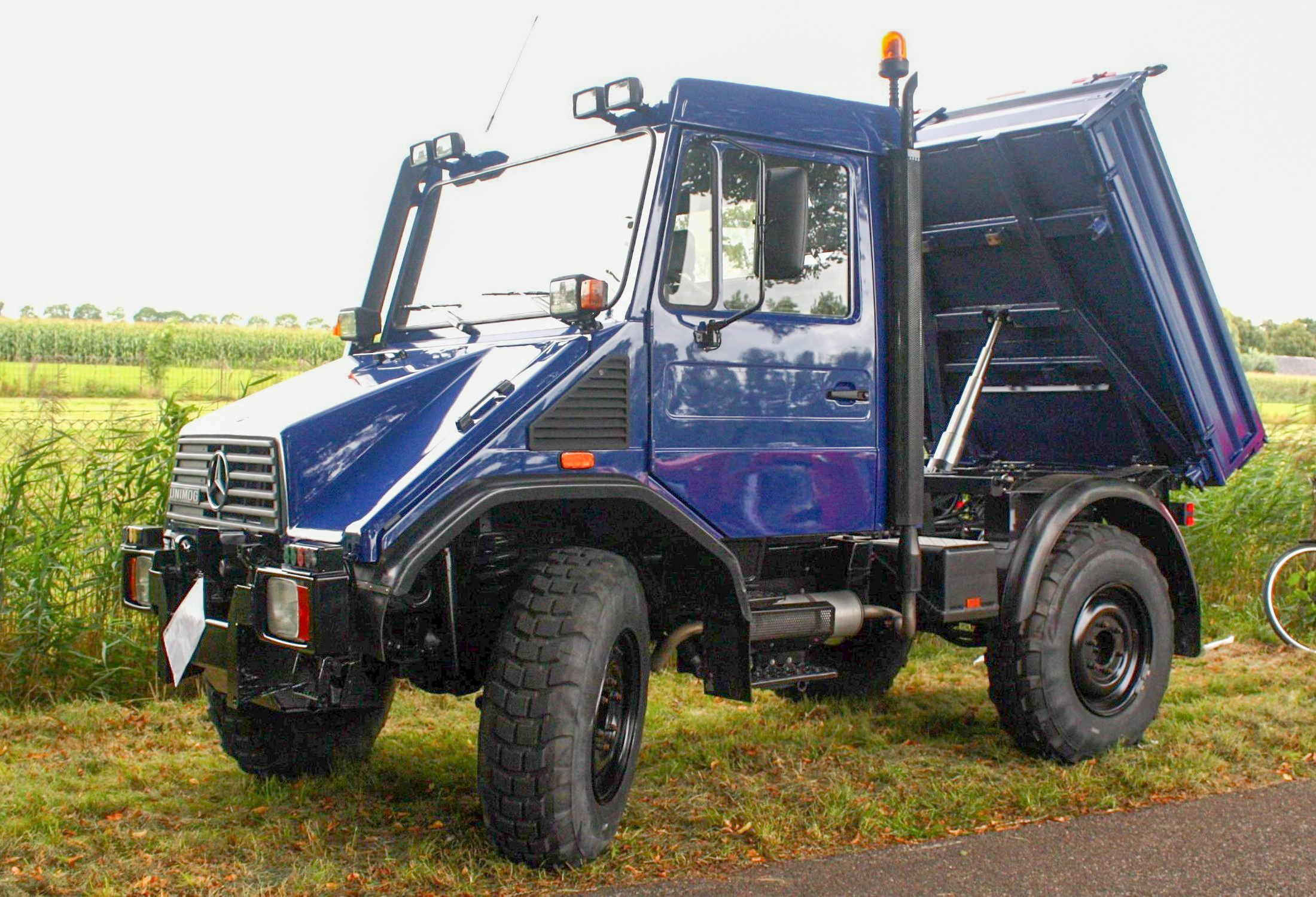
Unimog 408 dump truck

In the early 1990s, the new light models 408 (U 90) and 418 (U 110-U 140) with newly designed cabins were introduced to replace the predecessor models. The new very diagonal front portion gives the operator a good overview forward. The 408 features an asymmetric front bonnet, which is lower on the driver's side. This is supposed to permit the driver a good overview. A new ladder frame and progressively working coil springs to improve the Unimog's handling were implemented. In addition to that, the Unimog received a new tyre pressure adjustment system that can be operated whilst driving, an anti-skid system, new engines, and a "Servolock" mechanism for the hydraulic connection of implements.

==== 1994 – The "Funmog" ====
In March 1994, Mercedes-Benz presented the design concept "Funmog", a luxury version of the Unimog, on the International Off-Road-Exhibition in Köln, Germany. Based on the 408-series, it was only built by special order. Luxury options such as leather seats, deluxe carpeting and other interior modifications were available; though the design featured chrome bull bars and air horns, it lacked hydraulics and was limited to a total mass of 5,000 kg. Starting price was DM 140,000. A total of twelve units were built through 1997 by Daimler-Benz, most exported to Japan.

==== 1995 – U 2450 L 6×6 ====
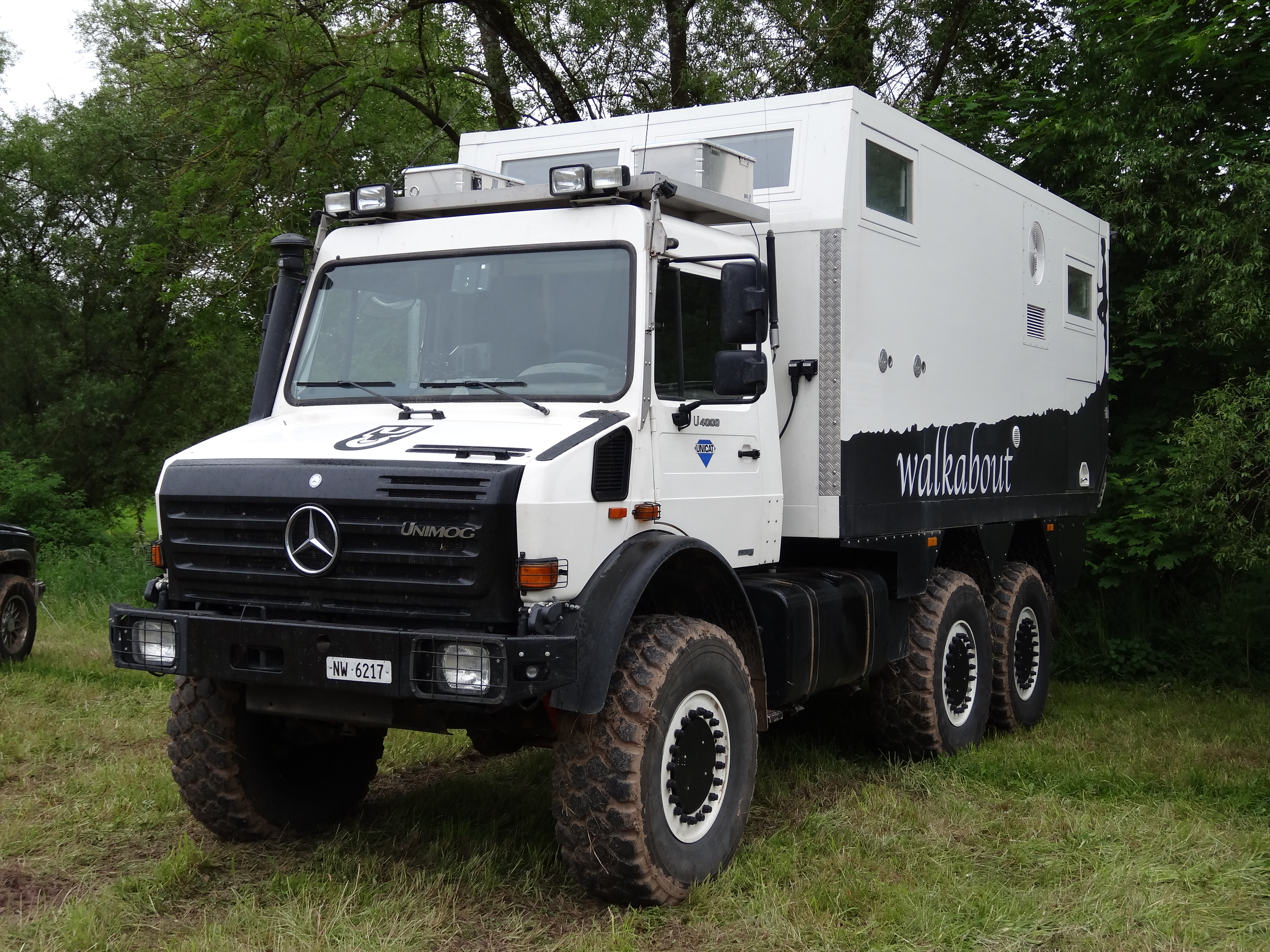
Unimog U 2450 L 6×6 (series 437)

In 1995, the Unimog U 2450 L 6×6 (437.156), an all-wheel-drive, 3-axle Unimog version, was presented.

==== 1996 – UX 100 ====
Mercedes-Benz presented the Unimog 409 (officially called UX 100) in 1996. It is the smallest Unimog model ever made and designed to slip speedily over sidewalks and around plants. Within a few years, production of the UX 100 was transferred to the Multicar subsidiary of Hako GmbH, who specialize in vehicles of this kind and size.

=== 2000s ===
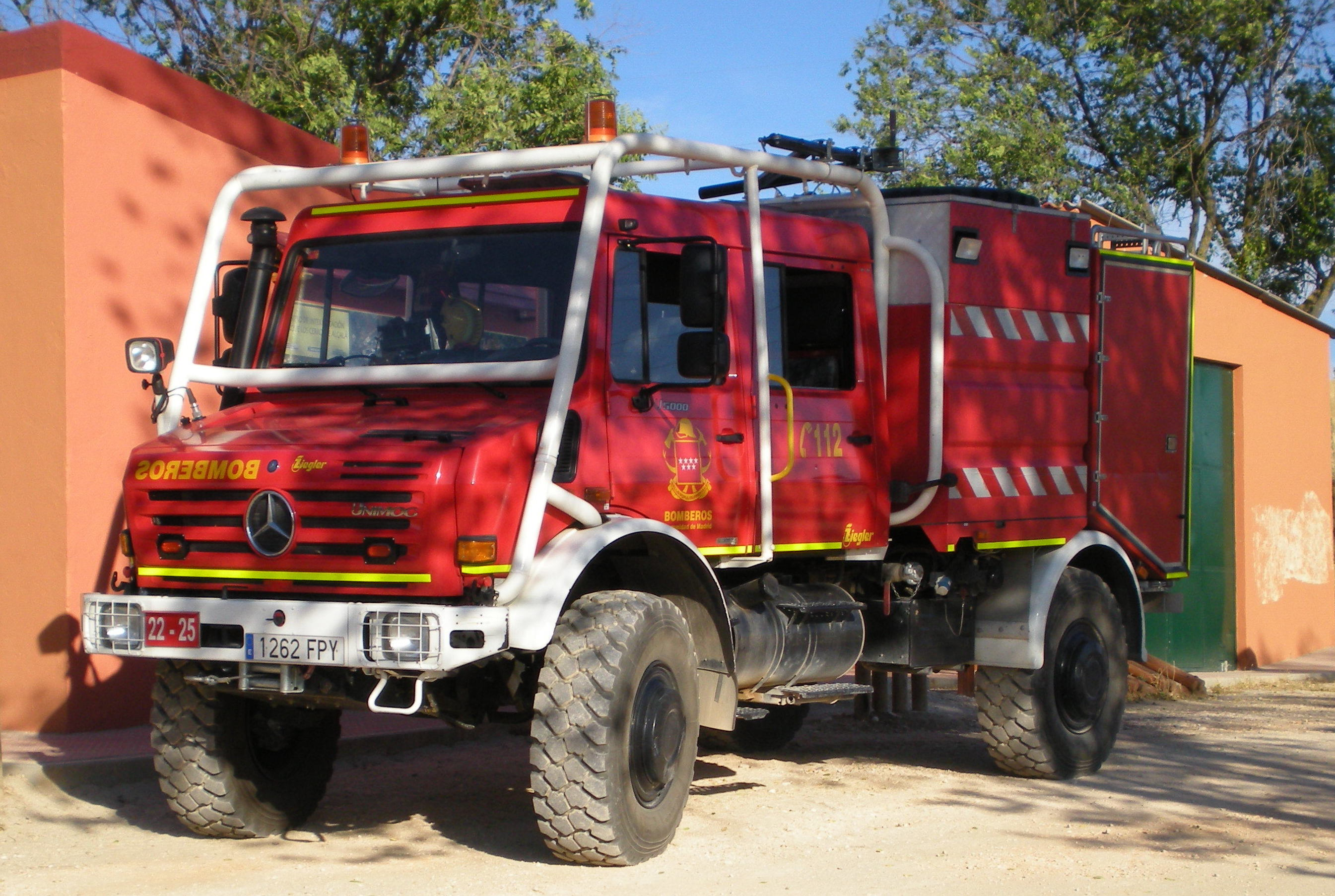
Unimog 437.4 U 5000 (UHN) fire engine with rollover protection structures

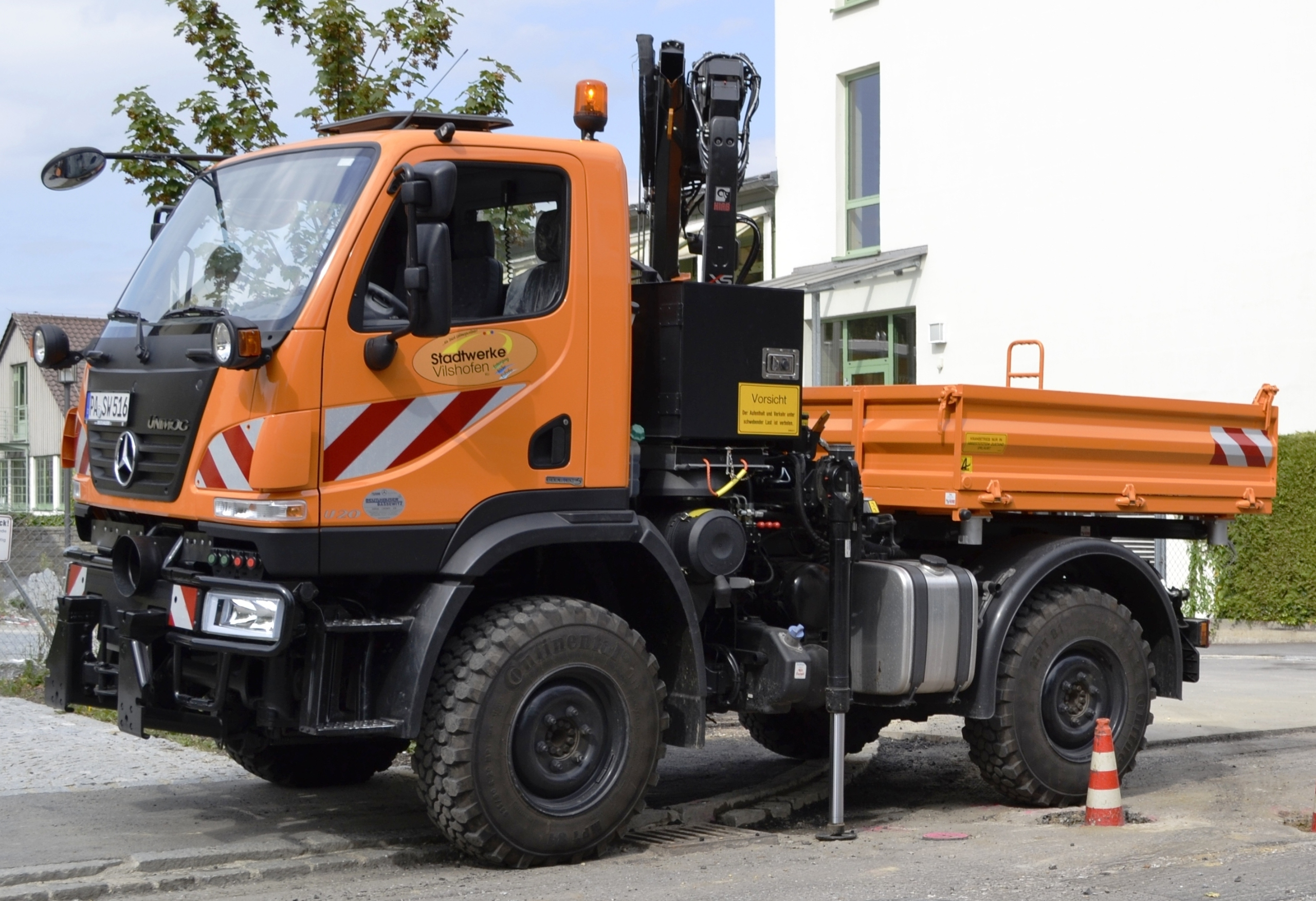
Unimog U 20 (series 405 LUG)

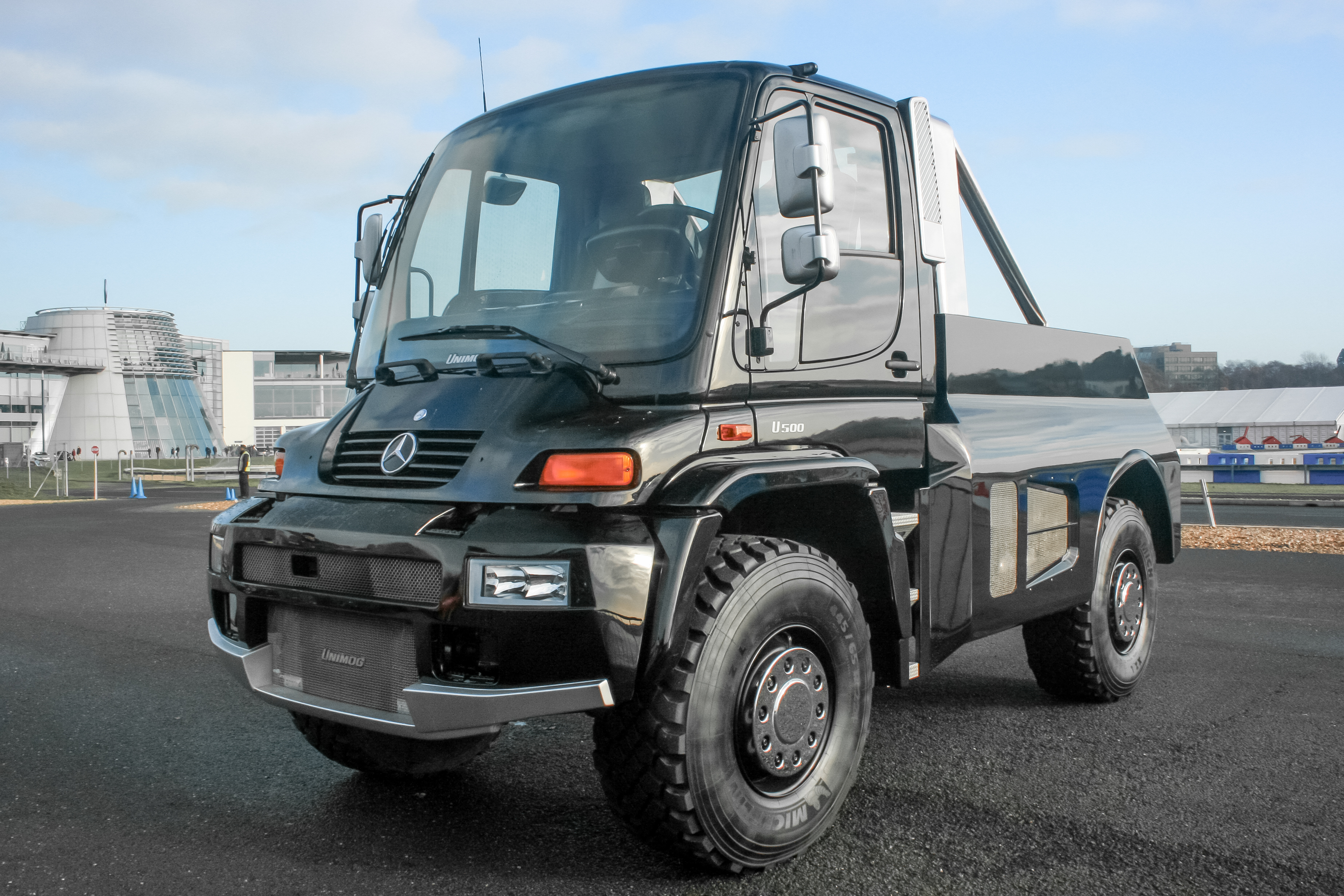
Unimog U 500 Black Edition (series 405 UGN) at the Mercedes-Benz World

The all-new range of UGN models (405 series U 300, U 400, U 500) was introduced in 2000.

In August 2002 production ended in the Gaggenau plant after 51 years and more than 320,000 Unimogs being made, and started up in Mercedes-Benz's truck manufacturing plant in Wörth am Rhein. The U 3000, U 4000 and U 5000 models (UHN 437.4 series) were introduced at the same time.

At the Dubai Motor Show in December 2005, the "Unimog U 500 Black Edition" premiered as an offering to wealthy desert-dwellers. It is a similar luxury offering comparable to the Funmog.

Starting from June 2006 the UGN series was produced with BlueTec technology so that the Euro IV emission requirements would be met. The design designations changed from 405.100 to 405.101.

At the IAA 2006 commercial vehicle show in Hanover a new Unimog U 20 was presented, which was to be available at the end of 2007. The most striking feature is the cab over design with no vestigial front bonnet characteristic of the traditional Unimog. It has a total mass of 7,500 kg up to 8,500 kg. The underlying technology comes from the U 300. The driving cab is from the new Brazilian Accelo light truck (Caminhões Leves) series. The wheelbase is shortened to 2,700 mm (106 in).

=== 2010s ===
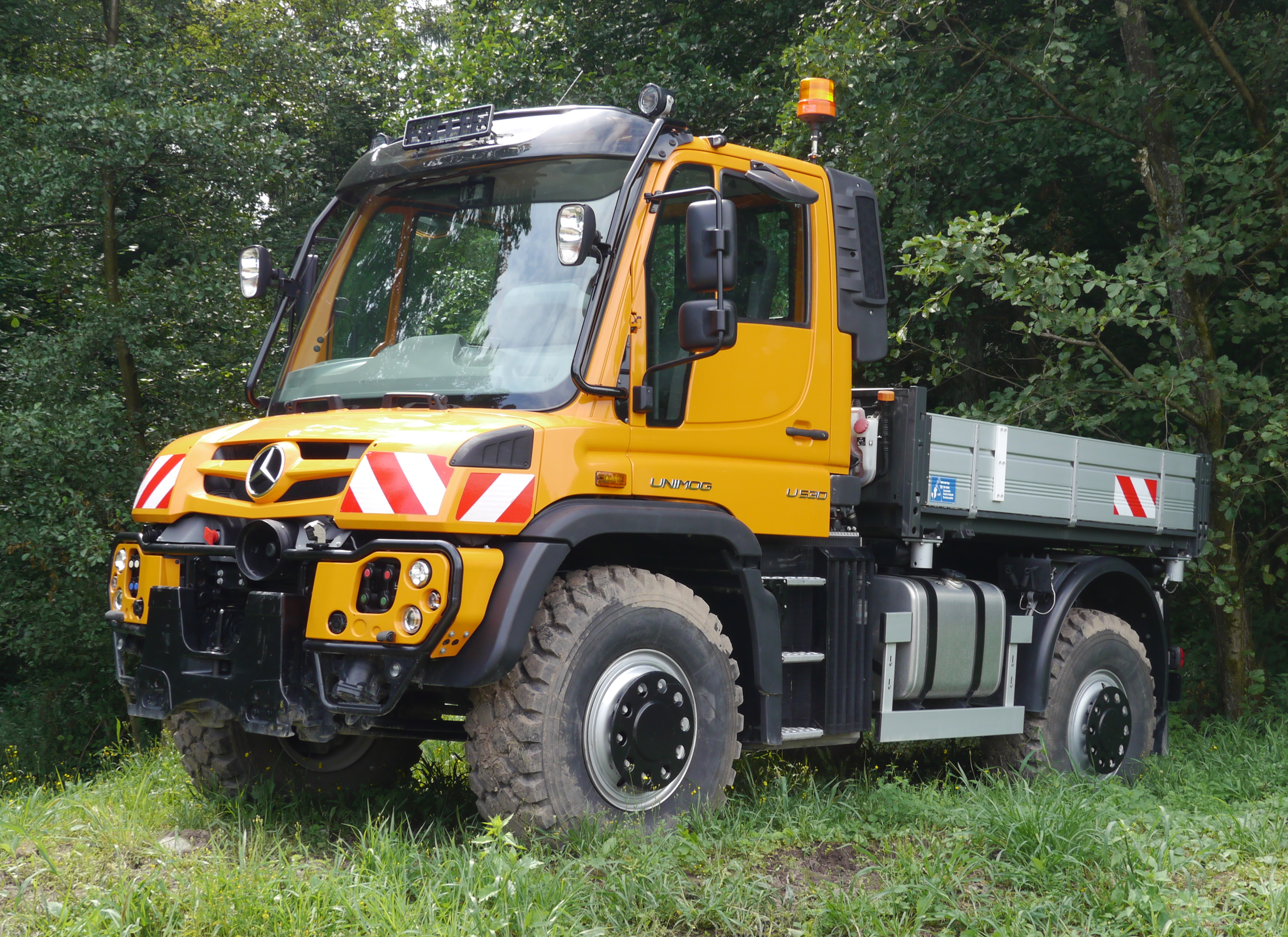
Unimog 405 UGE variant 2013–

In August 2013, production of the next generation models commenced at the Wörth plant. The new models feature redesigned cabins and new engines that were claimed to meet the Euro VI emission standards.

== Series numbers and models ==
Unimog series numbers like 401, 406, or 425 in this article are the factory numerical designation (in German "Baumuster", literally Construction Pattern). Unimogs also have a sales model number like U 80, U 120, or U 1350. Each series can have several model numbers, as they are equipped with different engines or chassis options.

Originally, the "U" model numbers were roughly equivalent to the horsepower of the engine (in German: PS):

- A 424.121 with a 2,630 mm (103 1/2 in) wheelbase equipped with the 100 PS (74 kW; 99 hp) OM 352 engine is a U 1000
- A 427.100 with a 2,650 mm (104 3/8 in) wheelbase and the 100-PS 366 engines is also a U 1000.

Starting in 1976, model numbers added an extra 0 at the end. More recent model numbers may have three or four digits and sometimes do not relate to horsepower (the engine of the U 5000 is rated at 218 PS). The most recent models introduced since 2013 are:

- The 437.4 series is intended for extreme offroad use, with the smaller U 4023 and larger U 5023 models, which are only available with 230 PS engines
- The 405 series is intended for use with implements, with three digit model numbers. The first digit is related to the vehicle size (U 200, U 300, U400 and U 500 model ranges) and the second and third digits related to the engine power, starting from the 190 PS U 219 and going up to the 350 PS U 535.

== See also ==
- Bremach – similar vehicles built in Italy
- Railcar mover
- SCAM – similar vehicles built in Italy
- Silant – similar vehicles built in Russia
- Pinzgauer – similar vehicles built in Austria
- Mercedes-Benz Zetros
