= Unimog 406 =

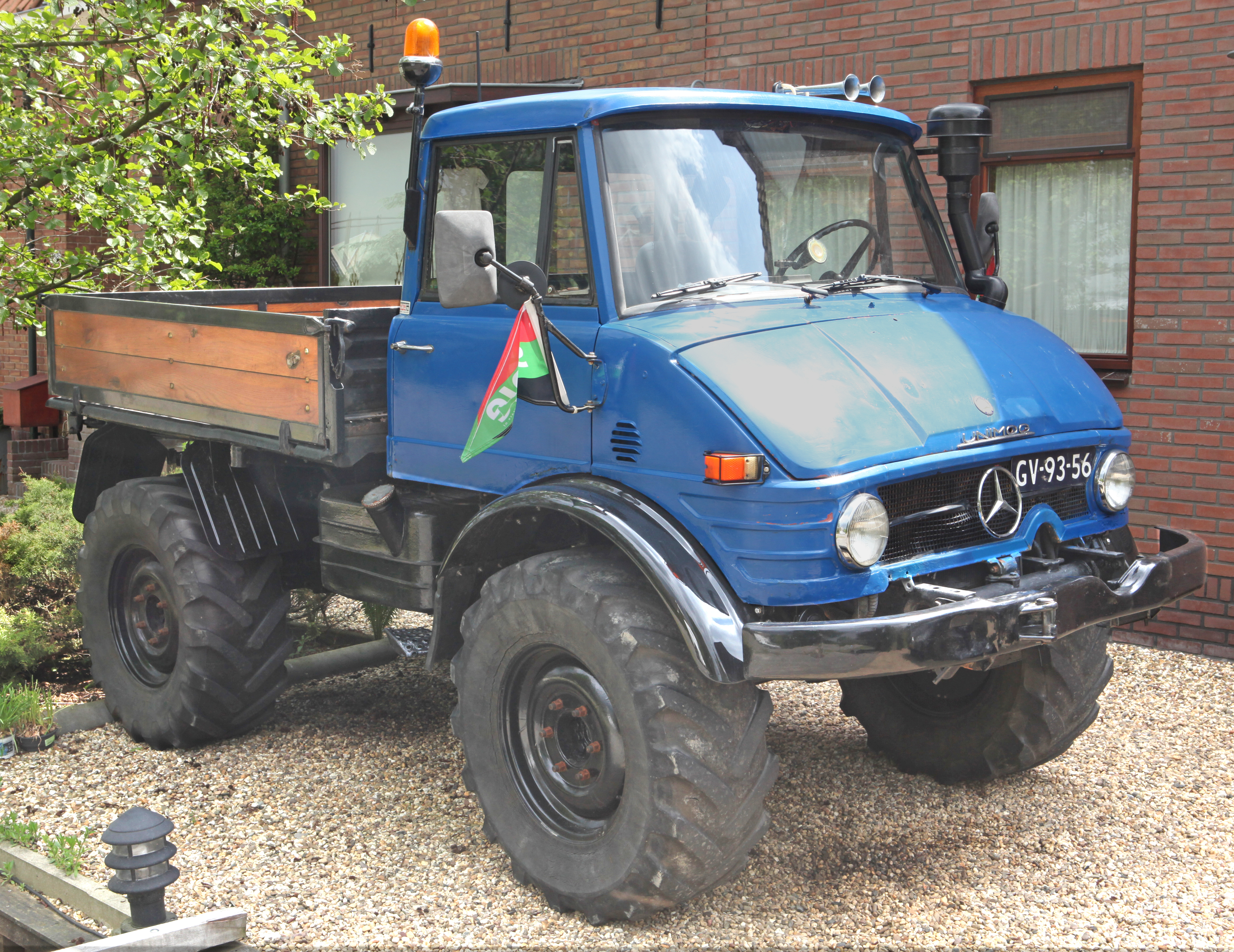
- Unimog 406.121

Overview
- Type: Truck
- Manufacturer: Daimler-Benz AG
- Also called: U65; U70; U80; U84
- Production: 1963–1989
- Assembly: Germany: Gaggenau (Mercedes-Benz Gaggenau plant)

Body and chassis
- Class: Medium duty truck
- Related: Unimog 416; Unimog 421; Unimog 403; Unimog 413; Unimog 426; Unimog 419

Powertrain
- Engine: OM 312 (Diesel, 48 kW); OM 352 (Diesel, 48–53 kW); OM 353 (Diesel, 59–62 kW)
- Transmission: UG-2/27: 6 / 2 manual 2 × 4 / 2 × 2 manual 2 × 6 / 2 × 2 manual 2 × 6 + 2 × 4 / 2 × 2 + 2 × 2 Manual

Chronology
- Predecessor: Unimog 411
- Successor: Unimog 417

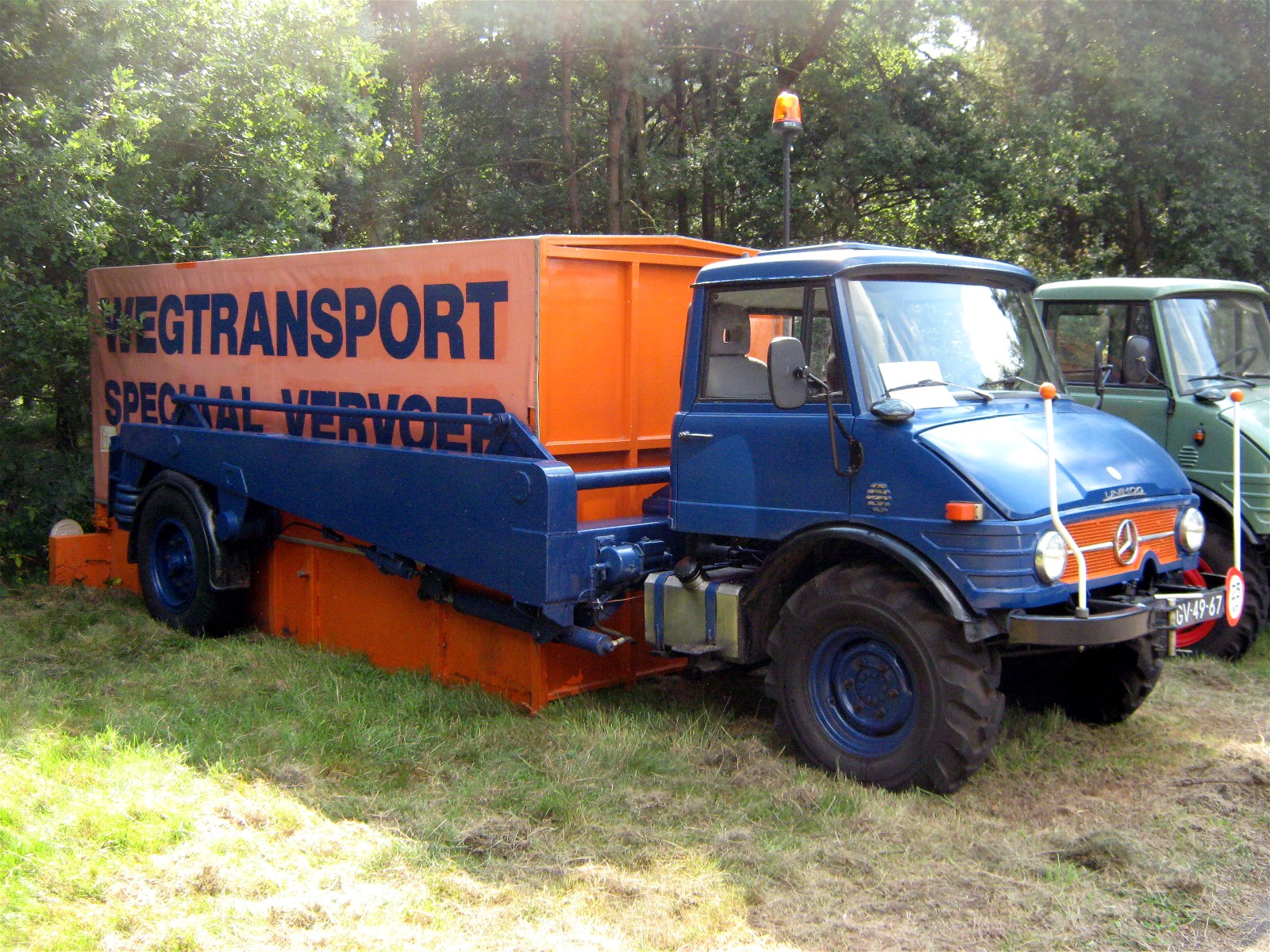
Conveyance motor Unimog 406.131 completed by an external vehicle builder. Only the front part was made in the Unimog plant.

The Unimog 406 is a vehicle of the Unimog-series by Mercedes-Benz. A total of 37,069 units were manufactured by the Daimler-Benz AG in the Unimog plant in Gaggenau from 1963 to 1989. The 406 was the first medium duty Unimog, having a larger wheelbase of 2380 mm and more than twice the engine power of the Unimog 401. Unlike the initial Unimog, the 406 does not have a car engine but a heavy duty truck engine instead. Several following Unimog versions were based on the 406. There were eleven different types made of the Unimog 406, which were available in four models (U 65 – U 84) with a closed two-door or four-door cab, as Cabrio and as an OEM part (a "half" Unimog lacking the rear part, as a basis for third party vehicle manufacturers). (Note: In his 1972 essay The present state of development of the Unimog, German Daimler-Benz engineer J. O. Wendeborn uses the term "drive-head" for the OEM part Unimog. ("The present state of development of the Unimog". A.T.Z. Automobiltechnische Zeitschrift. 74 (2). Springer-Verlag: 72. 1972. ISSN 0001-2785.) Drive-head is a literal translation of the German word Triebkopf that Daimler-Benz engineer C.-H. Vogler uses in his 2016 book. (Vogler, Carl-Heinz (2016). Unimog 406 Typengeschichte und Technik (in German). München: GeraMond Verlag. ISBN 978-3-86245-576-8. OCLC 949783030.)) During its long production period, the 406 received several technical refinements. In 1964, the precombustion chamber diesel engine OM 312 was replaced with the direct injected OM 352. Disc brakes followed in 1973. For many enthusiasts, the now highly collectible Unimog 406 represents the classical Unimog, having agricultural and silvicultural applications with the last of the drum braked 1973 406BT being the most desirable for collectors. It was successful and the best embodiment of the word Universal-Motor-Gerät considering all prior Unimogs.

== History ==
=== Conception and development ===
The initial Unimog concept was favoured by customers and accessory manufacturers, however, starting in the early 1960s, they desired a "heavy duty Unimog", following the trend of more powerful agricultural tractors beginning in the late 1950s which was due to German agriculture's shift to heavy mechanisation requiring less personnel. It led to the end of the tractor boom in Germany in the mid-1960s, a demand for agricultural tractors with low power output. The most powerful Unimog 411 model at that time was offered with a 25-kW-engine which was considered too weak for several applications. Analysts warned that the demand for the Unimog 411 would pass the zenith after 1960 and fall below 3000 produced units per year. This point was reached in 1964. Also, a decline of the military Unimog 404 production was foreseeable since the Bundeswehr had reached their required number of vehicles for the majority of their regiments and battalions. Therefore, Daimler-Benz decided to create a more powerful Unimog, the 406.

In 1960, the performance specifications were completed. The 406 was still supposed to be an agricultural and forestry vehicle and tractor but have a greater wheelbase, a higher top speed, the downbent frame of the Unimog 404 and a stronger engine. Three cabs were planned: The Cabrio cab, a closed cab and a closed double cab. The initial engine concept favoured the direct-injected four-cylinder, diesel engine OM 314 with 54 PS (40 kW). Since Heinrich Rößler, the leader of the Unimog development did not want this engine, it was decided to use the, also direct injected, six-cylinder OM 352 instead. New tyres had to be developed by Dunlop and Continental, also, the Unimog 406 needed a new hydraulics system for auxiliary devices and a new drivetrain with new axles and a new gearbox for the increased engine power. Several new 1,000 Mp (9,807 kN) sheet panel presses had to be installed in the plant in Gaggenau for producing the closed cabs.

The first prototypes were tested in 1961, prototype 1 was a disguised prototype vehicle lacking the Mercedes-Benz and Unimog emblems with a slightly different cab and the bumper of the Unimog 404, prototype 2 already had the cab of the series production model with emblems but still had the Unimog 404 bumper. The final presentation of the Unimog 406 was at the German Agricultural Society (DLG)-exhibition in Munich 1962, led by the Daimler-Benz board of directors. In the run-up to the presentation on 20 May 1962 a lot of minor Unimog changes and improvements as well as improvisations were made. Daimler-Benz split the truck production in Gaggenau in 1963; while the truck and lorry production was moved to the new Daimler-Benz plant in Wörth, the Unimog production stayed in Gaggenau. More production capacity could be used for the new Unimog 406. In 1963, 800 Unimog 406 were produced, the first 100 of them being pre-series production models.

During the late 1960s, the Unimog 406 was a popular type though the less powerful but cheaper types (403 with a smaller industrial engine and 421 with a car engine) were introduced. Yearly improvements increased the quality of the Unimog, the highest production figures were reached in the first half of the 1970s. With the start of the series production of the heavy duty Unimog types 425 in 1974 and 435 in 1975, the demand for the 406 was declining. The yearly improvements were reduced and since 1979, the 406 had not been changed anymore. Soon it became very unpopular with an average production number of only 380 Unimogs per year during the 1980s. Series production was stopped after 27 years in 1989.

- Also see → Production figures

=== Model changes ===
1964

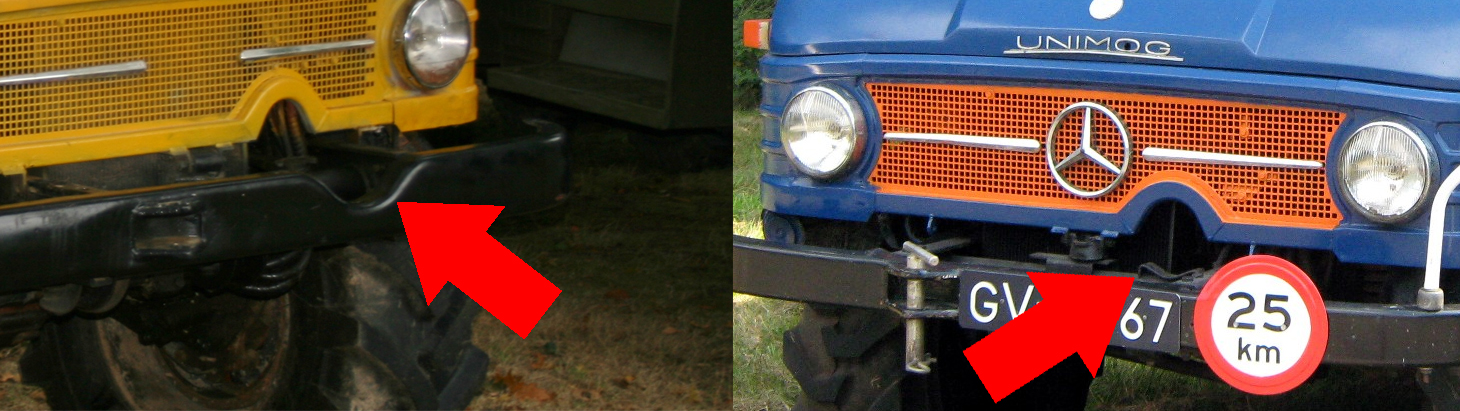
Left: 1974 model – Right: 1963 model. The indentation for the PTO in the front bumper was added in 1964. The right Unimog 406 lacks it.

Due to a shortage of OM 352 diesel engines, the first 1766 series production Unimogs as well as the prototypes were fitted with the precombustion chamber injected OM 312 diesel engine, detuned to 65 PS (48 kW). In 1964, OM 352 engines were available for the Unimog 406 and they were used instead, also detuned to 65 PS (48 kW). This power output turned out being insufficient for many applications the Unimog was used for, later Daimler-Benz decided to offer more powerful variants of the OM 352 engine for the 406. Further changes in 1964 included a Rockinger trailer hitch, an indentation in the front bumper for the front PTO, a compressed-air tank with a capacity of 27 litres instead of 20, uprated springs, new portal axles and new rims without the four apertures at an angle of 90°.

1965

In this year, the Unimog 416 production was started as well as the Unimog 406.130 / 406.131 OEM part production. The 406 was fitted with new mudwings, a new clutch and rectangular tail lights. Due to DIN and ISO standards which intended that the PTO shaft had to be underneath the trailer hitch, Daimler-Benz offered a PTO-relocating-gearbox for the rear PTO shaft.

1966

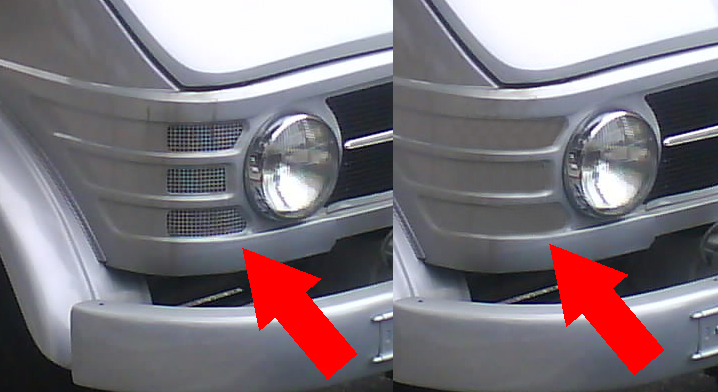
Left: 1965 model – Right: 1966 model. The air louvres for the heating and ventilation system were removed in 1966.

For the Unimog 406 production, 1966 was an important year. A tilting mechanism was added to the cab. The cab was also fitted with a new removable bonnet and a new windscreen, the air louvres for the heating and ventilation system next to the headlights were removed and replaced with smaller louvres near the indicators. The production of the U 65 came to a close, it was replaced by the more powerful U 70, now offering 70 PS (51 kW). Starting with the U 70, the four door double cab was offered for the first time. The drivetrain was improved with ruggedised reduction gears, new portal axles and axle stubs as well as optimised torque tube welding. Modifications of the electrical system included an electrical thermostat and a new alternator with an external governor. Also, the main brake cylinder was replaced. Some parts of the interior were changed as well.

1967

1967 brought only minor changes, the driver and passenger seats were upgraded, the rear-view mirror was modified. The portal axles were improved slightly.

1968

In 1968, the F-Gearbox was replaced with the G-Gearbox. Both are basically the same sliding gearboxes, however, the G-Gearbox has an additional intermediate gearbox. Furthermore, the 406 received a new governor for the compressed-air system and a new oil tank for the steering system as well as new outside mirrors.

1969

With the 1969 model changes, Daimler-Benz introduced the hinged windscreen for the Cabrio and a new closed cab with a bigger ventilation flap. The model U 80 was added to the model range in addition to the U 70. Also, the doors were made sturdier.

1970

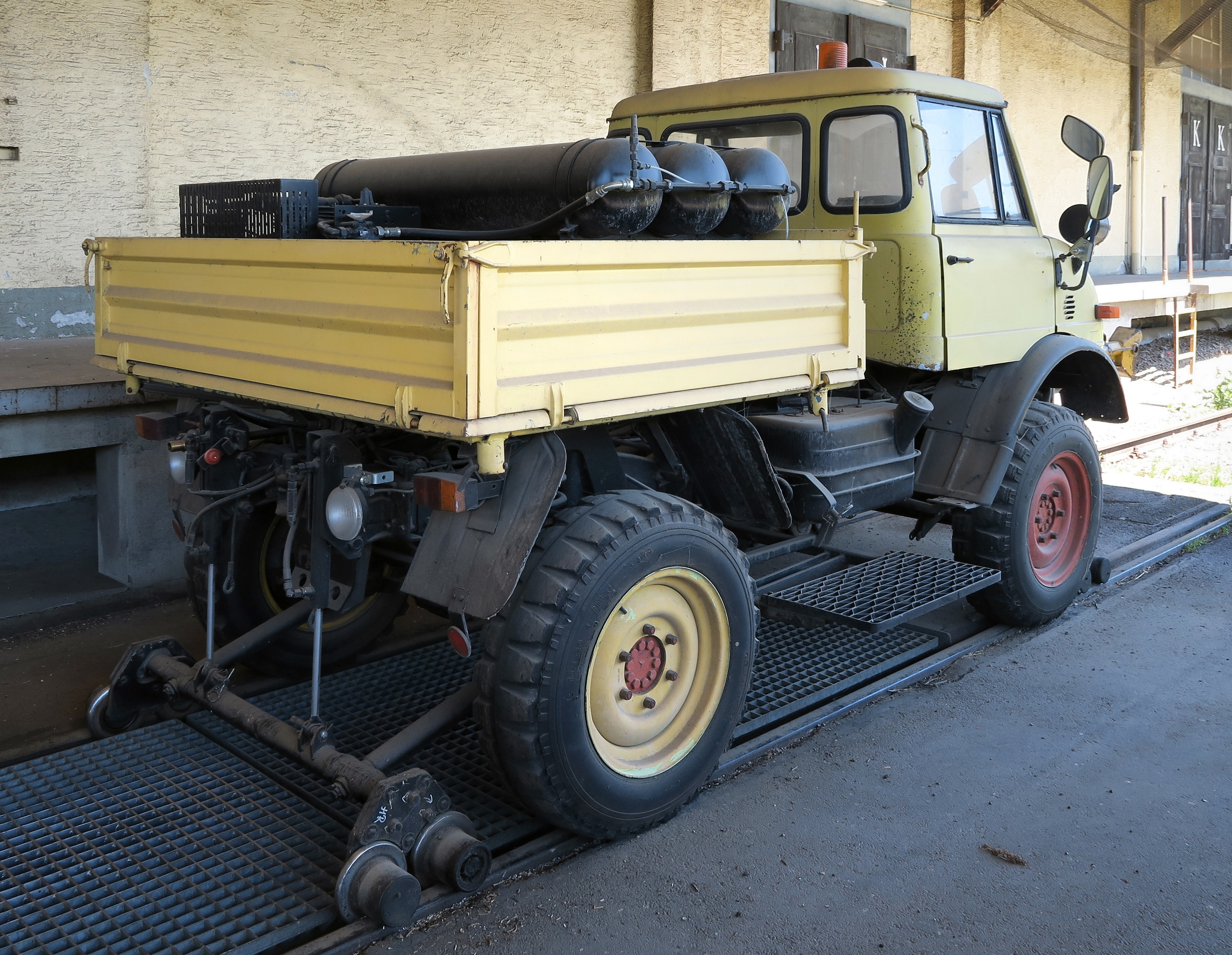
Unimog 406.121. This model has two additional rear windows.

The steering system was replaced with a hydraulically assisted ball-and-nut steering in 1970, the mechanical steering system was still offered as an option. New safety regulations required a roll bar for the 406, also, the closed cab models were equipped with two additional rear windows. The brake cylinders were upgraded again.

1971

In March 1971, the U 80 was replaced with the U 84. It was fitted with bigger, rectangular indicators, new tail lights, upgraded portal axles and a new aluminium bed.

1972

The 1972 changes were a removal of the ventilation louvres above the windscreen and the introduction of a plastic coolant reservoir.

1973

The last major changes were made on 2 July 1973 when the drum brakes were replaced with disc brakes. With the introduction of the disc brakes, a dual-circuit brake system was installed and the rim colour was changed from red to black. Also, the steering system was upgraded and the radius of the exhaust pipe was increased to 35 mm.

1974–1989

The most important improvements for the Unimog 406 were completed by 1974. In 1974, the exhaust silencer was modified, followed by a new step for the cab in 1975 and a constant-mesh version of the gearbox in 1976. The all-wheel-drive switching mechanism was upgraded to a pneumatic version in 1977, the chromed moldings on the front grille were removed in 1979. From 1979 to 1989, the 406 was produced without any major changes.

== Unimog 406 types ==
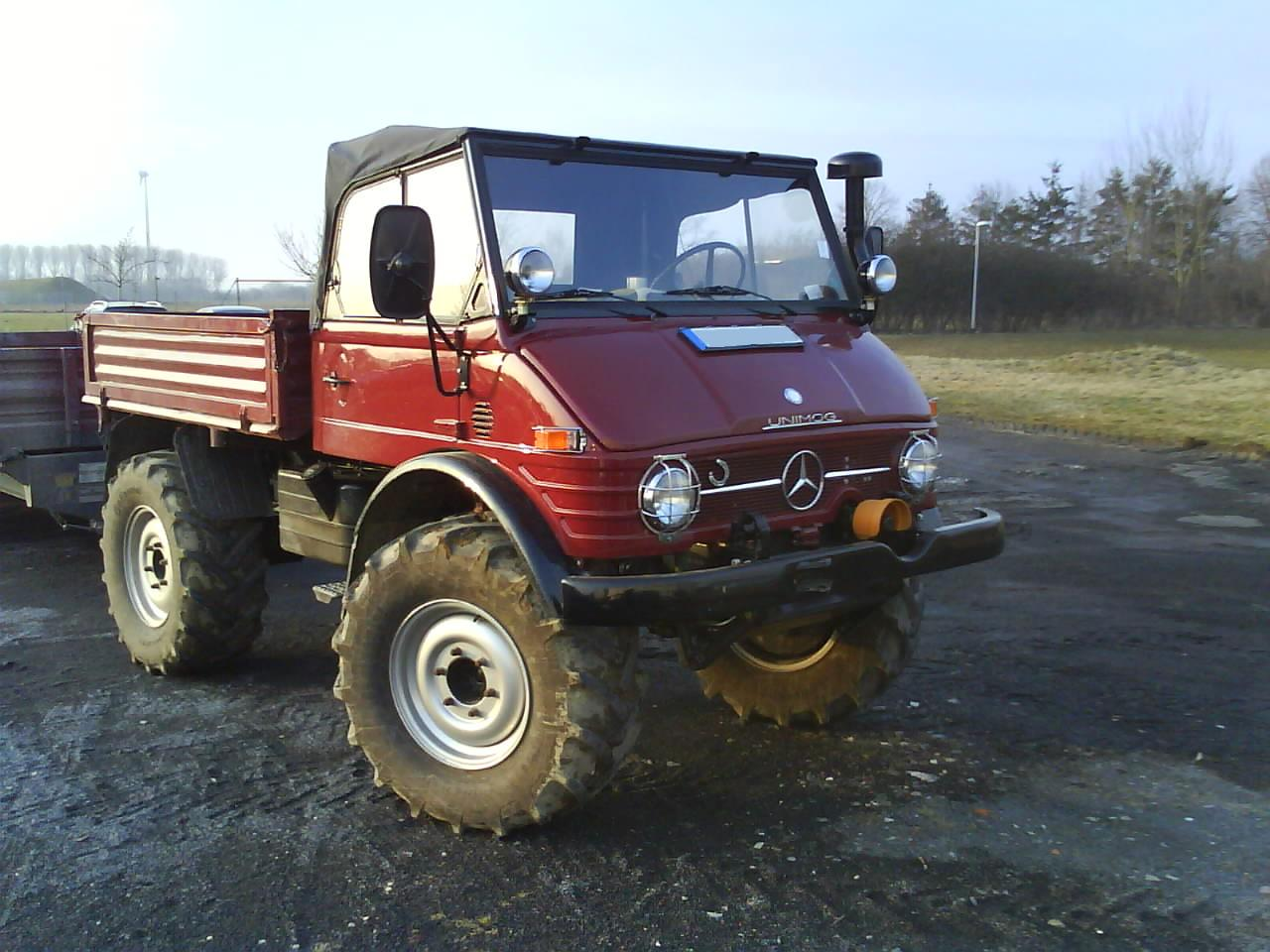
Unimog 406.120 Cabrio

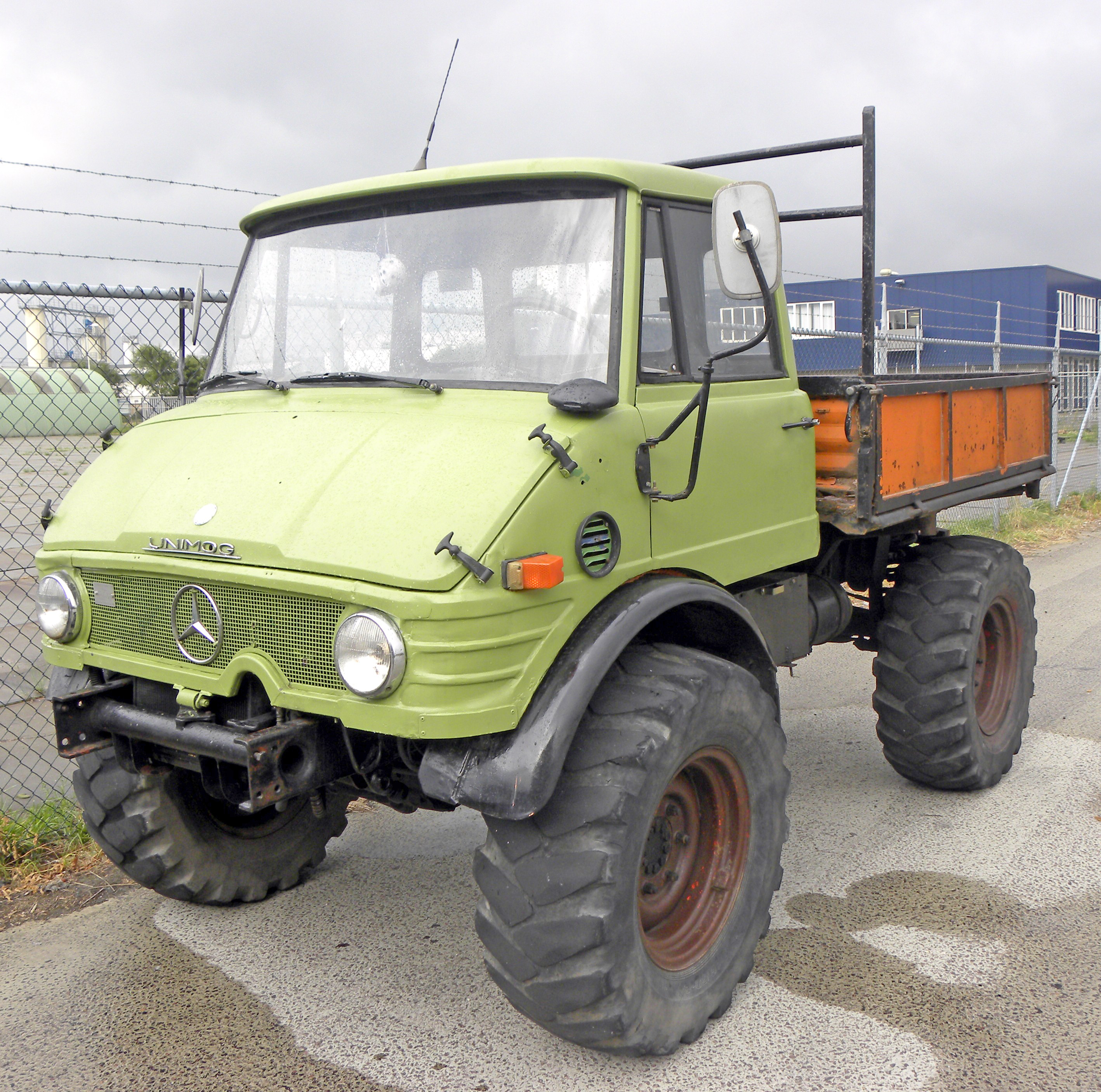
Unimog 406.121 without snorkel

Eleven different Unimog 406 types were offered with the standard cabrio (406.120) and closed cab (406.121) types being the most important, 96% of all Unimog 406 ever produced are either one of these two. The OEM part models were not given a type number until 1965 when they received the type numbers 406.130, 406.131 and 406.133. In 1968 they were merged into the Unimog 416 series. Each Unimog type was offered in different models, the four models were; U 65, U 70, U 80 and U 84 (later called U 900).

Unimog 406 types
| Type | Sold as | Cab type | Wheelbase | Power | | Production | Comment |
| Type | Sold as | Cab type | Wheelbase | PS | kW | Production | Comment |
|---|---|---|---|---|---|---|---|
| 406.120 | U 65, U 70, U 80, U 84 | Cabrio | 2380 mm | 65, 70, 80, 84 | 48, 51, 59, 62 | 12,753 | Standard cabrio model |
| 406.121 | U 65, U 70, U 80, U 84 | Closed cab | 2380 mm | 65, 70, 80, 84 | 48, 51, 59, 62 | 22,936 | Standard closed cab model |
| 406.130 | U 65 T, U 70 T | Cabrio | 2380 mm | 65, 70 | 48, 51 | | OEM part; merged into Unimog 416 series in 1968 |
| 406.131 | U 65 T, U 70 T | Closed cab | 2380 mm | 65, 70 | 48, 51 | | OEM part; merged into Unimog 416 series in 1968 |
| 406.133 | U 80 T | Cabrio | 2380 mm | 80 | 59 | 523 | OEM part; merged into Unimog 416 series in 1968 |
| 406.142 | U 900, U 84, U 100 | Cabrio | 2380 mm | 84, 100, 110 | 62, 74, 81 | | Internal works transport tractor, V_{max}: 40 km/h |
| 406.143 | U 900, U 84, U 100 | Closed cab | 2380 mm | 84, 100, 110 | 62, 74, 81 | | Internal works transport tractor, V_{max}: 40 km/h |
| 406.145 | U 900, U 84 | Closed double cab | 2380 mm | 84 | 62 | 302 | Bundeswehr aircraft tractor |
| 406.170 | | Cabrio | | | | | CKD-Kit |
| 406.171 | | Closed cab | | | | | CKD-Kit |
| 406.200 A | Was never sold | Cabrio/Closed cab | 2900 mm | 100 | 74 | 1 | Prototype, series production model merged into Unimog 416 series |
| Unimog 406 | | | | | | 37,069 | |

=== Further Unimog 406 models ===
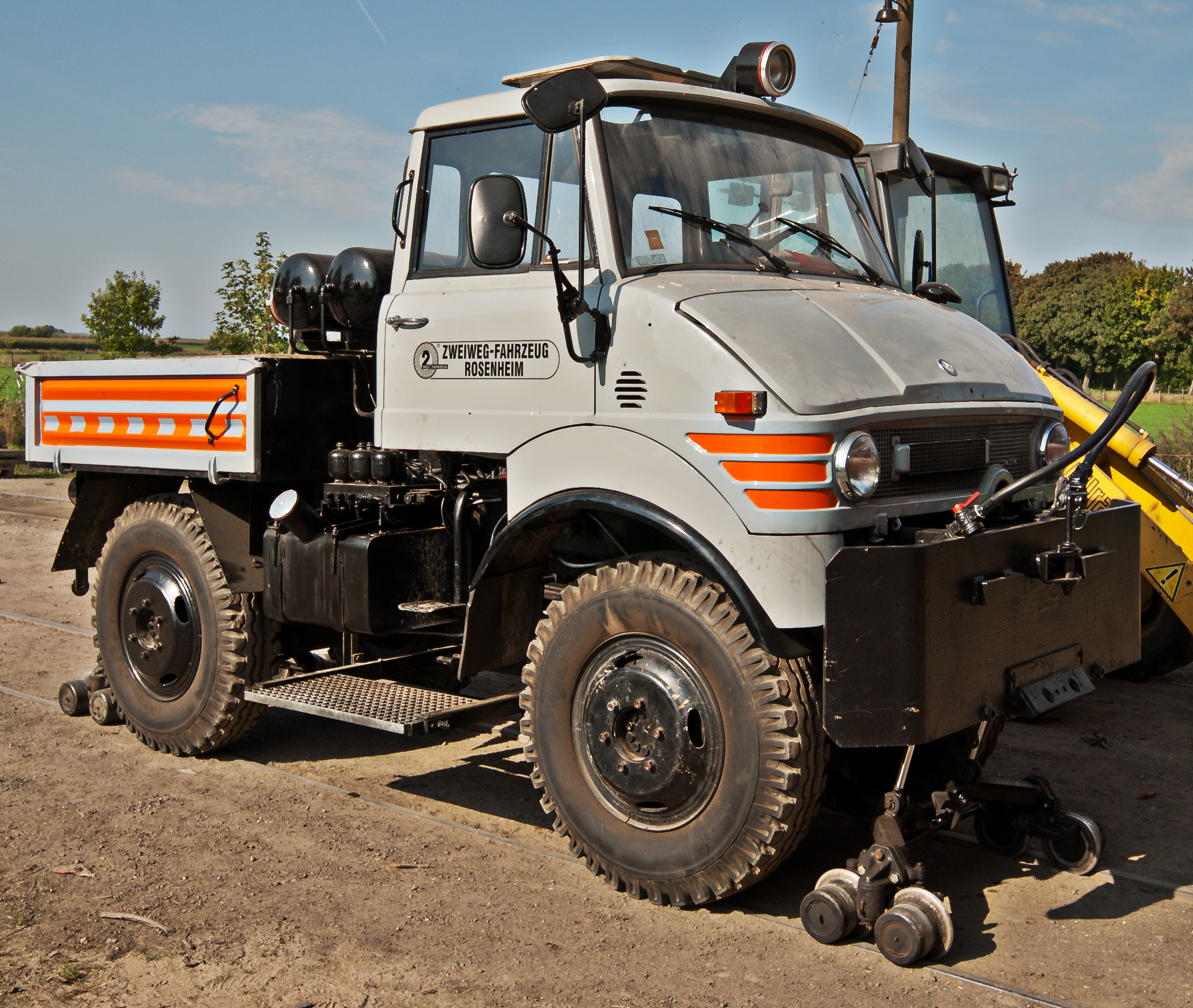
Multipurpose road-rail Unimog 406

The 406 was used as a basis for road-rail-vehicles made by external companies, the rated towing capacity is up to 300 t.

Initially, the Unimog 406 was offered with a 65 PS (48 kW) engine, this figure was later increased to 84 PS (62 kW) and series production models never exceeded it. Some prototypes and special order models were fitted with more powerful engines though. The first prototype of a road legal tractor for local hauling and internal works transport in the Unimog family was the 406.200 A in September 1969. It had the long wheelbase of the Unimog 416 and an OM 352 engine with 100 PS (73.5 kW). The 1971 series production model of this particular tractor was integrated into the Unimog 416 series and had the type numbers 416.140 (cabrio) and 416.141 (closed cab). The latter was produced 3496 times.

For industrial internal works transport, the types 406.142 and 406.143 were made. Daimler-Benz decided to offer the default 84 PS (62 kW) engine for these types, though customers could also purchase more powerful variants of these types with either 100 PS (73.5 kW) or 110 PS (81 kW). None of these was produced more than approximately 300 times which makes any Unimog 406 with more than 84 PS very rare.

=== The double cab ===
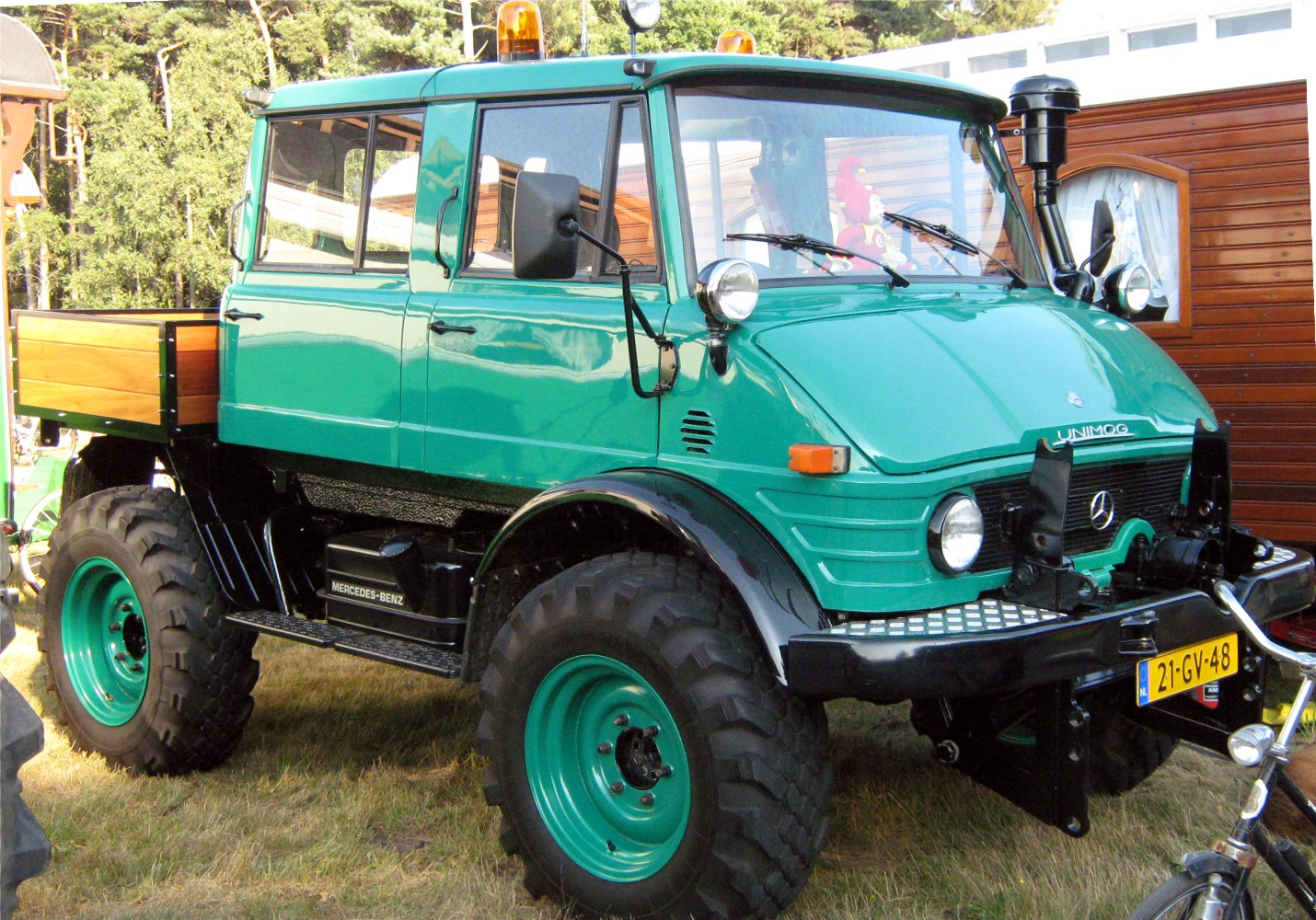
Unimog 406.145 double cab

Initially, it was planned that the Unimog 406 would also be offered with a closed double cab in addition to the cabrio and default closed cab. The closed double cab was made by Wackenhut in Nagold, mainly the type 406.145, an aircraft tractor, was fitted with this cab. Only 353 double cab Unimog 406 were made with 302 of them being 406.145. However, not only the 406 was offered with a double cab. In fact, the 416 is the most common double cab Unimog of the 406 family. Unimog 416 with double cabs were converted into motorhomes quite often.

== The Unimog 406 model family ==
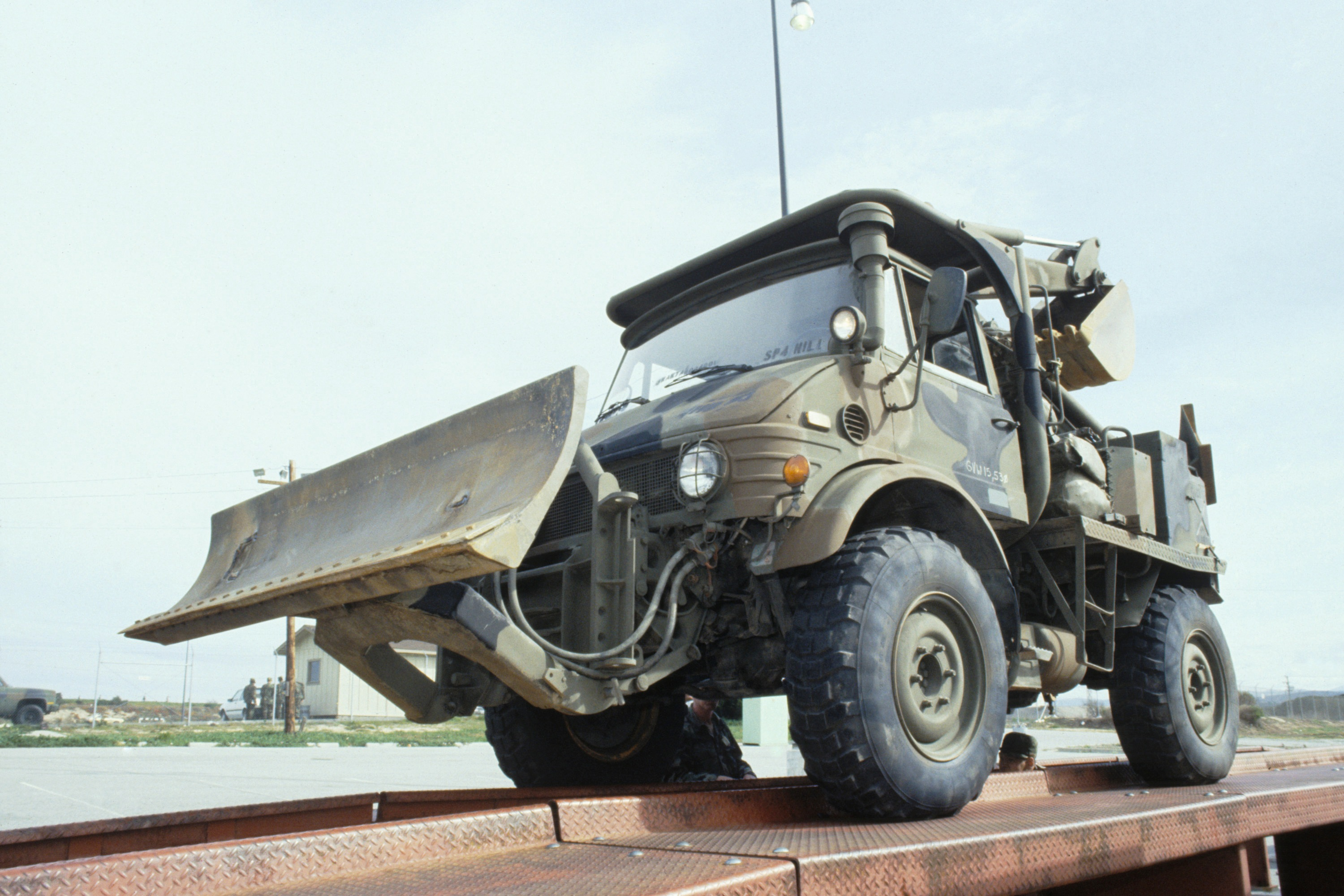
Unimog 419

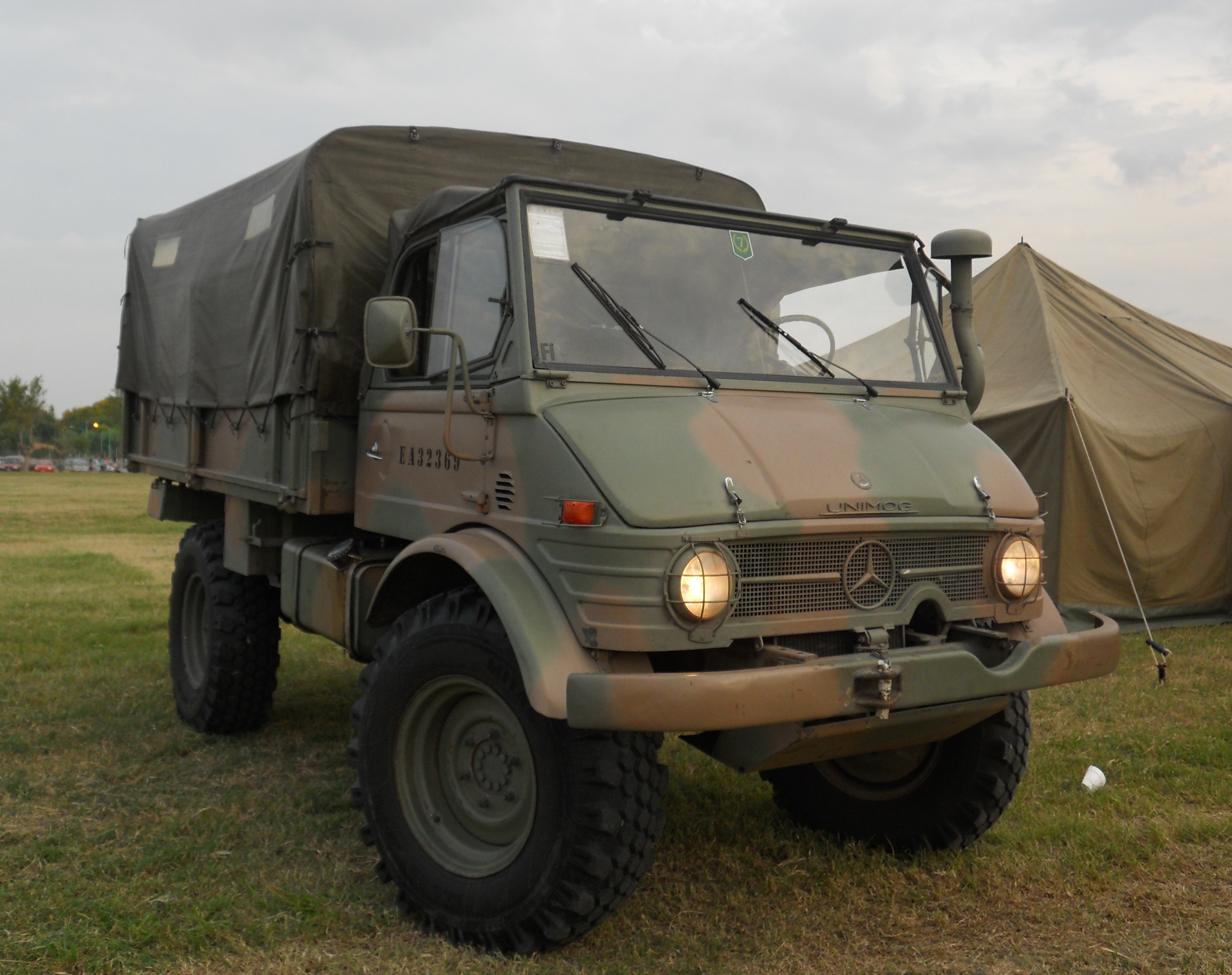
Unimog 426 of the Argentine Army

With the Unimog 406, Daimler-Benz laid the foundation for the expansion of the Unimog family. 94,215 Unimogs of eight different series belonging to the 406 family were made from 1962 to 1994. The family included similar models all based on the technical and optical design of the Unimog 406 with different engines, wheelbases and applications. In 1965, the first long wheelbase model in addition to the 406 was offered, the Unimog 416. It had the same wheelbase as the long wheelbase model of the Unimog 404: 2900 mm. It was also available with 3400 mm. Later, the conveyance motor models and the more powerful prototypes of the Unimog 406 were also integrated into the Unimog 416 series. Engines with 80–125 PS (59–92 kW) were offered for this model. It was the most popular Unimog of the 406 family with 45,544 units made. In March 1966, the Unimog 421 was added to the Unimog family, a weaker model with 40 PS (29 kW). It was followed by the Unimog 403 in August 1966. The 403 has the OM 314 engine with 54 PS (40 kW) that was initially planned for the 406 and is therefore a cheaper model. With the increasing demand for higher power output, Daimler-Benz offered a 66 PS (48 kW) version starting in 1969 that was followed by a 72 PS (53 kW) model in 1976 for the 403. Optically and technically there are no differences between the Unimog 403 and 406 other than the engine. Since Daimler-Benz also wanted to offer an inexpensive version of the long wheelbase model, they created the Unimog 413. Due to the less powerful OM 314 engine, it was less expensive but also very unpopular, only 633 Unimog 413 were made. From 1969 to 1971, CKD-kits of the Unimog 421 were made for the production in Argentina. These Unimogs belong to the Unimog 431 series.

While the majority of military Unimogs are 404s, some 406-family Unimogs were also made for military use. These are the 426 and the 419. Starting in 1969, completely knocked-down (CKD) Unimog 416 parts were made in Gaggenau and shipped to Argentina, where these parts were used to build a licensed version of the Unimog which was given the number 426. In total, 2643 Unimog 426 were made for the Argentine, Chilean, Peruvian and Bolivian military. A version for the United States Army with the type number 419 was made starting in 1986. Approximately 2200 units were planned, in total, 2416 were produced. The Unimog 419 has the same wheelbase as the 406 but comes with a more powerful version of the OM 352 engine with 110 PS (81 kW). Unlike other Unimogs, it was sold under the Freightliner brand name and classified as Small Emplacement Excavator (SEE) tractor that was used as an engineer vehicle. The Unimog 406.145 was a military aircraft tractor.

== Production figures ==
37,069 vehicles of the Unimog series 406 were built. The entire "model family 406" reached a total production of 94,215 vehicles, to which the "Unimog 416" contributed most significantly with its 45,544 vehicles built.

View source data.

== Technical description ==
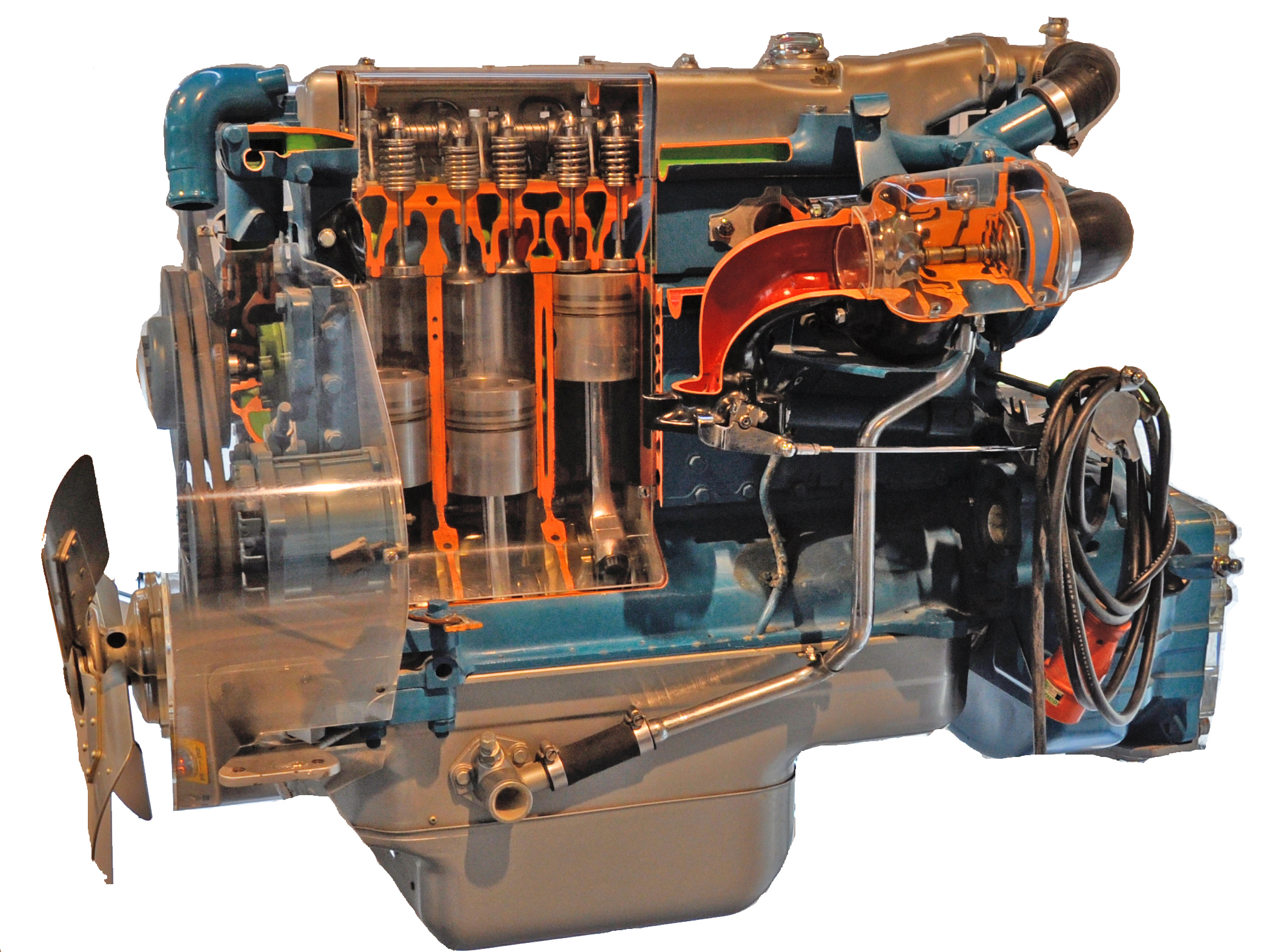
Cutaway of OM 352 engine; on the Unimog version the turbocharger was not fitted.

The Unimog 406 is a multi-purpose off-road capable vehicle with four wheels of the same size. Like the Unimog 404, it has a downbent ladder frame, two portal axles with torque tubes, reduction gears and coil springs with hydraulic shock absorbers for the rear and front axles. For powering mountable equipment, two standard switchable 540/1000 rpm PTOs are built in; both can be switched on and off independently. The 406 is a rear-wheel-drive vehicle with switchable all-wheel-drive and three differential locks. A bed is mounted on the rear part of the Unimog frame. The 406, like the initial Unimog, has a 12V electric system by default though a 24 V electric system with two 12 V lead acid batteries was available for military and other customers who preferred it - often because of trailers shared with trucks.

=== Cab ===
Daimler-Benz made the Unimog 406 with a cabrio cab and with a closed single or double cab; while the cabrio and closed single cab were built by Daimler-Benz, the double cab was produced by Wackenhut. All cabs have a three-point-mount. Both cabrio and closed single-cab versions have two seats, the double cab version has three additional seats. Gauges, steering wheel, levers, the sliding seats and further interior parts such as the ventilation and heating system resemble the parts also used in Mercedes-Benz trucks of the 1960s and were considered ergonomical and comfortable at that time. Cabrio models from 1969 onwards have a fold-down windscreen. Starting in 1970, the cabrio models were fitted with a roll bar that protects the driver in case of an accident. The air-inlet is on the left hand side of the Unimog 406, a snorkel was a factory option. The snorkel comes with a built-in cyclone dust separator.

=== Bed ===
Series production Unimogs have a bed with the dimensions 1950 × 1890 mm and approximately 3.7 m^{2} (40 sq ft). A hydraulic dumping ram makes it possible to dump the bed. For several applications, Daimler-Benz also offered a smaller bed (1475 × 1890 mm; 2.8 m^{2}), furthermore, it is possible to demount the bed completely.

=== Engine ===
Initially, the water-cooled straight-six precombustion chamber diesel engine type OM 312 powered the Unimog 406. It has a displacement of 4.580 litre and produces roughly 48 kW. In 1964, this engine was replaced with the direct-injected straight-six diesel OM 352 (Note: The Diesel engine Mercedes-Benz OM 352 was made in so many different types that Daimler-Benz had to rename some of them to keep their spare parts logistic system working. Therefore, some OM 352 engines simply have the name OM 353.) that was produced until 1989. The OM 352 displaces 5.675 litre and is naturally aspirated in the Unimog version, its power output figure was changed over the production period several times, however, the standard power output never exceeded 62 kW. Some special order Unimog versions of the 406 series were also offered with higher engine power outputs, these special versions are very rare though.

=== Drivetrain and suspension ===
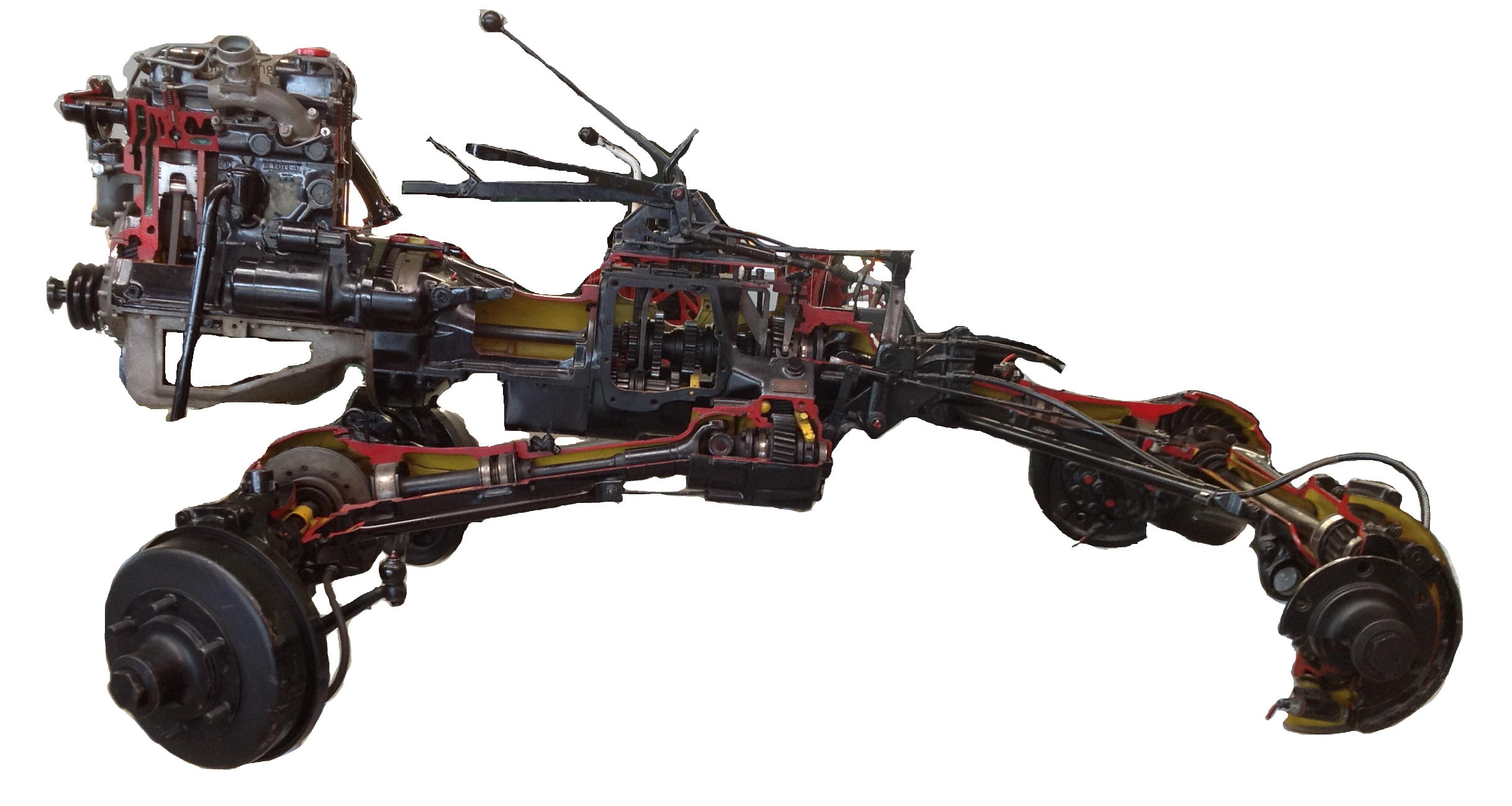
Unimog drivetrain cutaway model (Unimog 401)

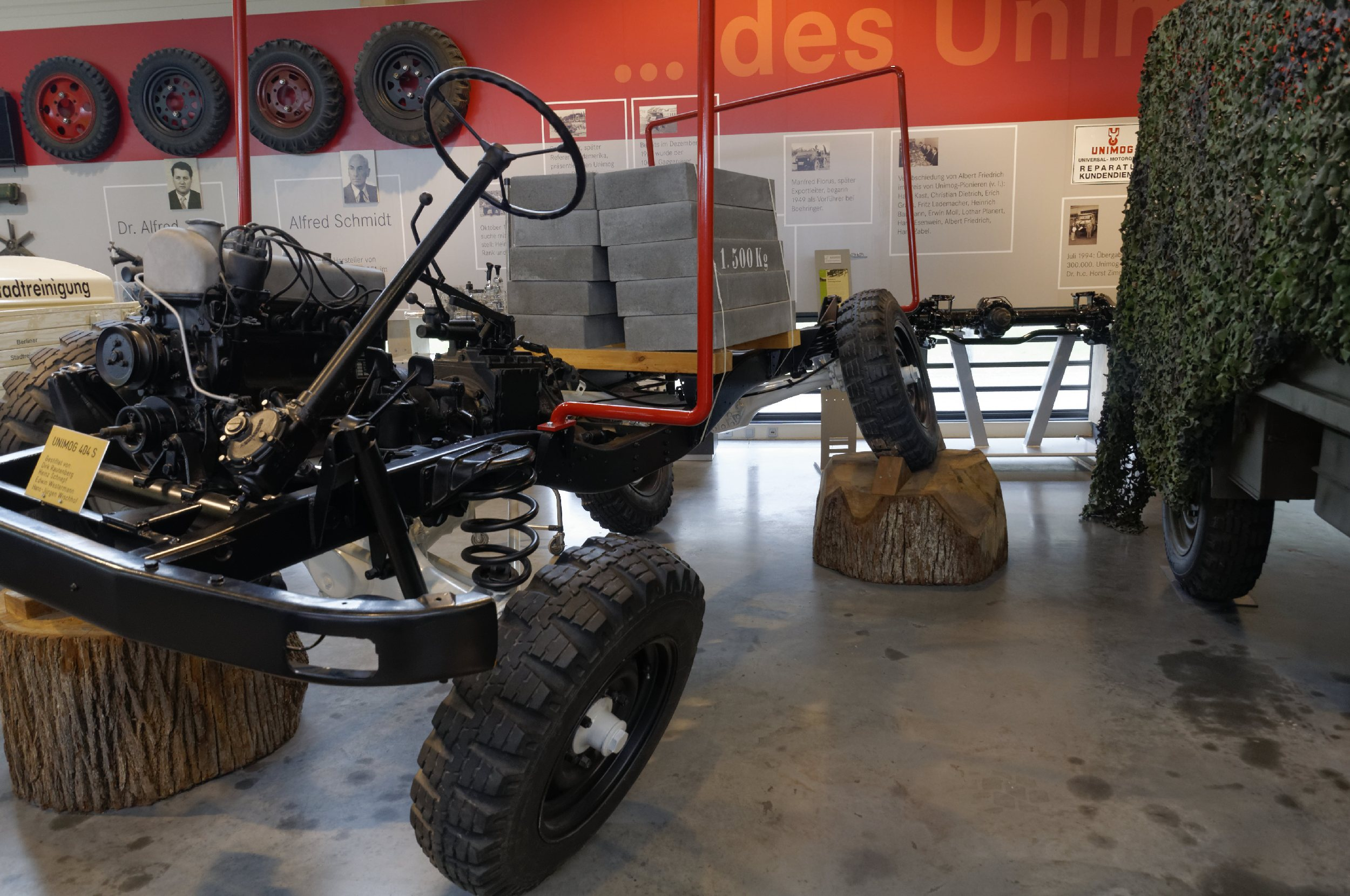
Unimog frame (Unimog 404) Front and rear part of the Unimog frame allow torsional flexing while the centre is rigid.

Like the Unimog 404, the 406 has a downbent ladder frame and rigid portal axles. The ladder frame allows torsional flexing at the front and rear part but is rather rigid at its centre. This is achieved by the position of the transverse rails with tulip shaped weld seams. The portal axles have reduction gears so that the Unimog would have a good ground clearance even with small wheels. Most important part of the drivetrain are the two torque tubes that transmit the torque from the gearbox to the portal axles. Since the torque tubes hold the portal axles in place, the Unimog does not need longitudinal control arms. A torque ball connects the torque tube to the gearbox and allows some flexion. The portal axles have coil springs and telescopic shock absorbers. This construction allows very long suspension travel. The standard tyres have the size 10.5–20", Daimler-Benz also offered 12.5–20", 14.5-20" and 22-20"-tyres as a factory option.

=== Gearbox ===
The 406 has the fully synchronised four-speed UG-2/27 group sliding gearbox that is designed for a maximum input torque of 27 kp·m (264.8 N·m). It was available with four different gearbox layouts:

The default gearbox layout (F-Gearbox) was used for the models U 65 and U70. It has four gears and two groups. The first group however only allows the first and second gear to be engaged so that the total number of gears is six; the gearbox lever has a six-speed H-layout. When shifting from second into third gear, the gearbox automatically switches from the first into the second group. The gearbox lacks a reverse gear, instead, the Unimog has a second gear lever for switching the driving direction. This lever is part of an additional reverse gear unit. When in reverse, due to the gearbox construction, only the first group of the gearbox, that can make use of the first two gears only, can be used. This results in two reverse gears.

The standard gearbox was available with an additional intermediate gearbox for the model U 80 and U 84 (G-Gearbox). The intermediate gearbox simply doubles the number of gears, resulting in 2 × 6 forward and 2 × 2 reverse gears. Its gear lever has the three positions ″main gearbox″, ″intermediate gearbox″ and neutral. In addition to the additional intermediate gearbox, Daimler-Benz also offered a crawler-gearbox. The crawler-gearbox can be used with the first and second gear of each group of the main gearbox, it has two crawler gears, ″crawler″ and ″super crawler″, a neutral position and a ″main gearbox″ position. When in main gearbox position, all main gearbox gears can be used. This results in 2 × 6 + 2 × 4 forward and 2 × 2 + 2 × 2 reverse gears.

In 1976, the default gearbox was upgraded to a constant mesh version and made available with a fully usable first gear group, resulting in eight forward gears and four reverse gears. The eight-speed-gearbox-lever has a single-H-layout with an additional lever for switching the groups, rather than the six-speed-H-layout.

Depending on the gearbox, the Unimog 406 was equipped either with a single-disc dry clutch (usually type G 280 KR) or a dual clutch.

=== Hydraulic system ===
Daimler-Benz installed a hydraulic system made by Westinghouse in Hannover. It is sturdier than the Unimog 411 hydraulics system and consists of six main components: one pump, one oil reservoir, two hydraulic cylinders and two control units. The hydraulic pump is a gear-driven Westinghouse Typ 5 P 41-13 and initially had an operating pressure of 150 bar and a delivery rate of 32 litre per minute, later these figures were increased to 40 litre per minute and 180 bar. In the front part of the Unimog, the hydraulic oil reservoir holds the operating fluid, the filling quantity of the entire hydraulic system is 18 L. The two control units are located behind the engine, they have one lever each. Both levers are mounted on the steering column underneath the steering wheel. With the first lever, the driver can control either the hydraulic dumping cylinder for the bed or the hydraulic cylinder for the rear three-point linkage. The second lever allows the control of auxiliary devices.

Initially, the hydraulic steering system was attached to the main hydraulic system. Later, it received a separate pump and finally a separate hydraulic circuit. The standard hydraulic power-steering system is a worm-and-nut steering type ZF 19/74, a hydraulically assisted ball-and-nut steering was offered optionally and later became standard, replacing the worm-and-nut steering system in 1973. Each wheel of the 406 has a pneumatic-hydraulic servo drum brake; starting in 1973, disc brakes were used instead. Unimogs for export markets were still offered with drum brakes until 1989.

Unimog prototypes and the 1962 presentation model did not have an infinitely adjustable hydraulic system; meaning that activating a lever for a hydraulic device would either turn the full hydraulic power on or off, not allowing fine and slow adjustments.

=== Pneumatic system ===
Like earlier Unimogs, the Unimog 406 has a pneumatic system, however, it is mainly used for the brake system. Also, it is used for engaging the differential lock. It consists of several parts: An air compressor driven by the engine that generates the pressure for the pneumatic system, a control valve in front of the rear axle, the compressed-air tank in front of the left rear tyre, the valve for the differential lock, the pneumatic brake booster and the master brake cylinder for activating the hydraulic brake and the trailer brake system. The pneumatic trailer brake systems connects to the Unimog using two quick connectors, one for the compressed-air for the trailers compressed-air tank and one for activating the brake itself. An additional air compressor was available that reduces the amount of time required to fill the compressed-air tanks. Initially, the compressed-air tank had a capacity of 20 L, it was increased to 27 L in 1966.

== Paintwork ==
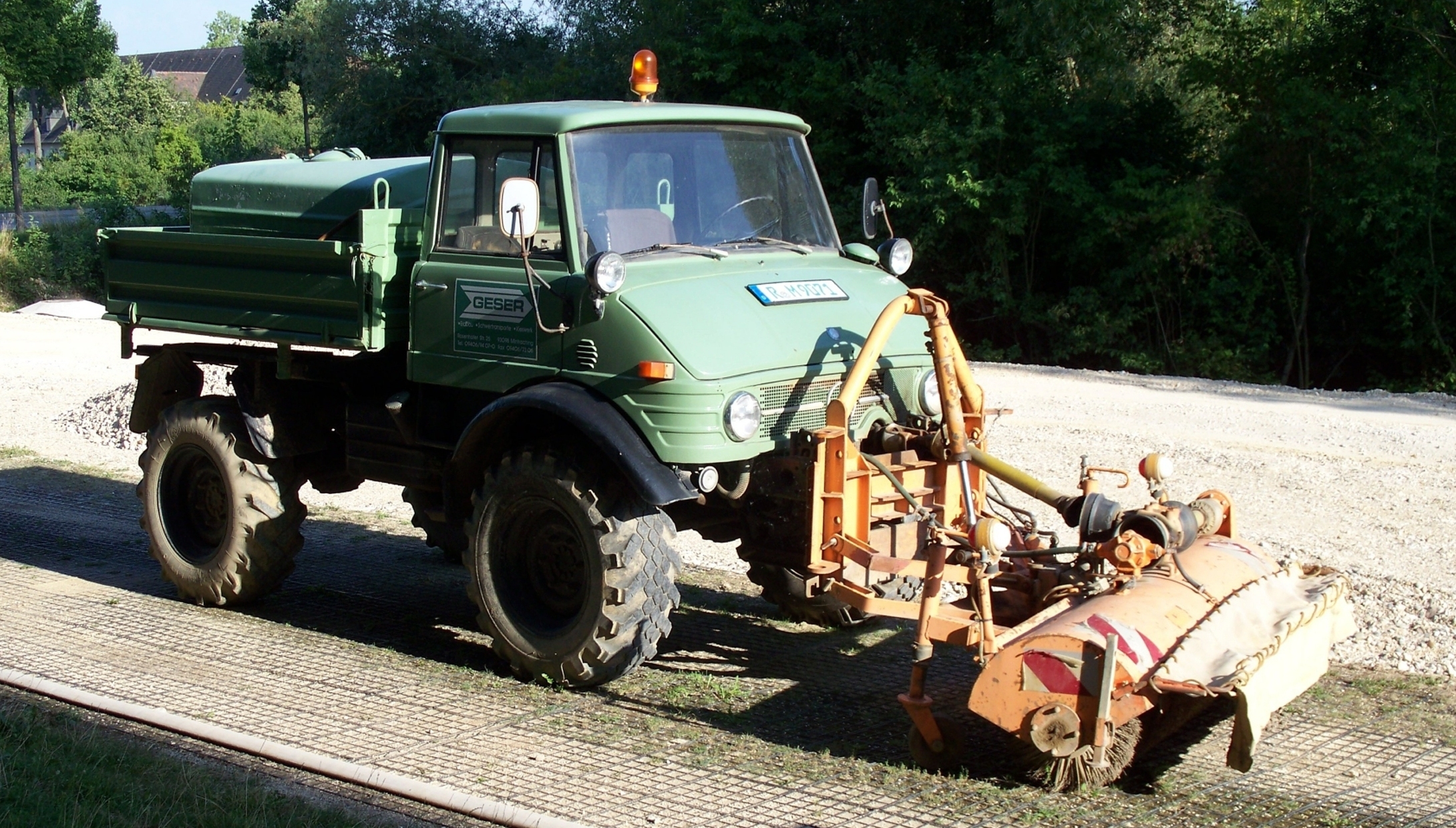
Unimog 406.121 painted in "lorry green", the most common Unimog colour.

Initially, the Unimog 406 was painted in lorry green (DB 6277), approximately more than 70 % of all Unimogs ever made have this colour. Daimler-Benz offered six colours for the paintwork in the 1970s; other colours were available as an extra.

Default colours

| Lorry green (DB 6277) | Sap green (DB 6821) | Lorry grey (DB 7187) | Brown orange (DB 2603) (RAL 2011) | Amber yellow (DB 1624) | Curry yellow (DB 1600) (RAL 1027) |

Extra colours

| Brown beige (DB 1448) (RAL 1011) | Yellow orange (DB 2550) (RAL 2000) | Fire red (DB 3534) (RAL 3000) | Red orange (DB 2553) (RAL 2001) | Gentian blue (DB 5361) (RAL 5010) | Moss green (DB 6294) (RAL 6005) | Pebble grey (DB 7701) (RAL 7032) | Grey-white (DB 9136) (RAL 9002) |

== Technical specifications ==
| Type | U65 | | U70 | U80 | U84 |
|---|---|---|---|---|---|
| Years | 1963–1964 | 1964–1966 | 1966–1968 | 1969–1971 | 1971–1989 |
| Mass (approx.) | 2,650 kg (5,840 lb) | | 3,100 kg (6,800 lb) | | 3,600 kg (7,900 lb) |
| Length | 4,000 mm (157 1/2 in) | | 4,100 mm (161 3/8 in) | | 4,160 mm (163 3/4 in) |
| Width | 2,000 mm (78 3/4 in) | | 2,030 mm (79 7/8 in) | | 2,130 mm (83 7/8 in) |
| Height | 2,250 mm (88 5/8 in) | | 2,330 mm (91 3/4 in) | | 2,325 mm (91 1/2 in) |
| Wheelbase | 2,380 mm (93 3/4 in) | | | | |
| Track width | 1,536 mm (60 1/2 in) | | | | 1,555 mm (61 1/4 in) |
| Bed length | 1,950 mm (76 3/4 in) | | | | |
| Bed width | 1,890 mm (74 3/8 in) | | | | |
| Bed height | 400 mm (15 3/4 in) | | | | |
| Tyres | 10–20" (12.5–20") | | 10.5–20" (12.5–20") | | |
| Engine model | OM 312.954 | OM 352.919 | OM 352.902 | OM 353.902 | |
| Engine type | Straight-six Diesel, water-cooled | | | | |
| Fuel system | Precombustion chamber injection | Direct injection | | | |
| Displacement | 4.580 litres (279.5 cu in) | 5.675 litres (346.3 cu in) | | | |
| Bore × stroke | 90 mm × 120 mm (3.54 in × 4.72 in) | 97 mm × 128 mm (3.82 in × 5.04 in) | | | |
| Rated power (DIN 70020) | 65 PS (48 kW; 64 hp) | | 70 PS (51 kW; 69 hp) | 80 PS (59 kW; 79 hp) | 84 PS (62 kW; 83 hp) |
| Max. torque (DIN 70020) | 21.4 kp⋅m (210 N⋅m; 155 lb⋅ft) | 23.7 kp⋅m (232 N⋅m; 171 lb⋅ft) | 24.5 kp⋅m (240 N⋅m; 177 lb⋅ft) | 25.9 kp⋅m (254 N⋅m; 187 lb⋅ft) | 27.5 kp⋅m (270 N⋅m; 199 lb⋅ft) |
| Top speed | 65 km/h (40 mph) | | | 71 km/h (44 mph) | 79 km/h (49 mph) |
| Source | | | | | |

== Unimog tuning ==
The initial factory power output of the naturally aspirated OM 352 engine was 93 kW with a maximum torque of 353 N·m, this figure was later increased to 96 kW / 363 N·m. The Unimog however received a significantly power-reduced engine version. Daimler-Benz never offered the standard and high-power output versions for the Unimog 406, since its gearbox and clutch are designed for an input torque of only 27 kp·m (264.8 N·m). For increasing the engine power of the Unimog 406 to 96 kW, the gearbox and clutch have to be replaced first. The engine itself usually needs a paper air filter instead of the oil-bath air cleaner, a new oil filter and a modified injection pump because the built-in injection pump cannot be set to 96 kW.

== Bibliography ==
- Carl-Heinz Vogler: UNIMOG 406 – Typengeschichte und Technik. Geramond. München. 2016. ISBN 978-3-86245-576-8. (German)
