= Unimog 419 =

German tractor

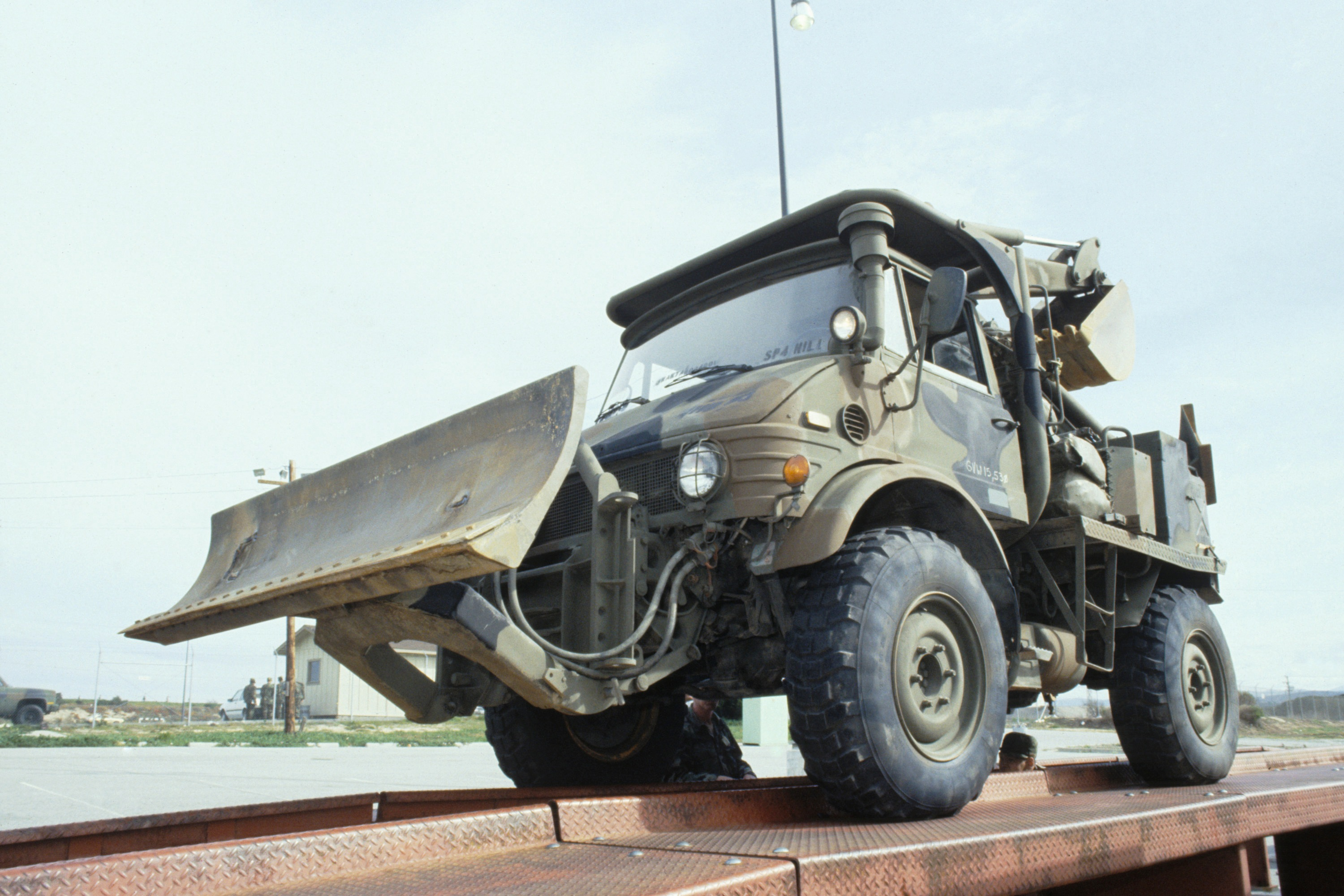
- An Unimog 419

Overview
- Type: Tractor
- Manufacturer: Daimler-Benz AG
- Also called: Freightliner tractor, SEE Tractor
- Production: 1986–1991
- Assembly: Mercedes-Benz-Werk Gaggenau

Body and chassis
- Related: Unimog 406

Powertrain
- Engine: OM 352 (Diesel, 81 kW (109 hp; 110 PS))
- Transmission: 4-speed manual gearbox with ranges, (16 forward and 8 reverse gears in total)

Dimensions
- Wheelbase: 2,380 mm (93 3/4 in)
- Length: 6,350 mm (250 in)
- Width: 2,440 mm (96 1/8 in)
- Height: 2,600 mm (102 3/8 in)

Chronology
- Predecessor: none
- Successor: none

The Unimog 419, also known as the Freightliner tractor or simply SEE Tractor, is a military vehicle made by Daimler-Benz for the US Army. It is technically related to the Unimog 406. Daimler-Benz designed four different types of the Unimog 419 and made a total of 2416 units, with most of them being SEE tractors. Manufacture took place at Daimler-Benz's Gaggenau plant in Germany, where the Unimog 419 was assembled using the Unimog 406's chassis, the Unimog 416's engine, and American-made off-the-shelf components such as the entire 24-Volt electrical system. The US Army used the Unimog 419 as a combat engineering vehicle.

== Unimog 419 types ==
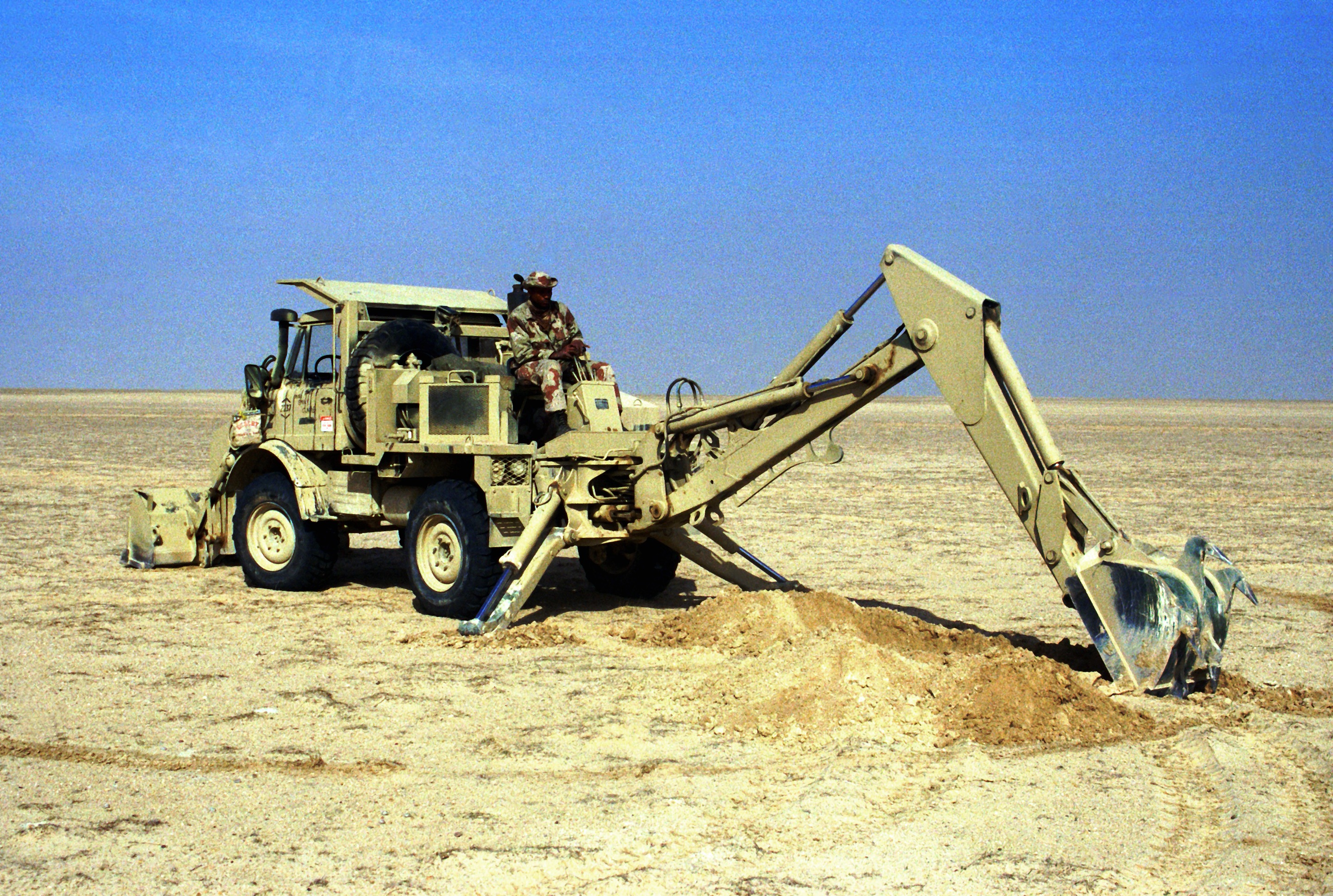
Unimog 419 during Operation Desert Storm

All Unimog 419 types have a 2380 mm wheelbase, a closed single cab, and a naturally aspirated straight-six 5.7 liter OM 352 diesel engine rated 81 kW.

Unimog 419 types
Type	Model	Number built
419.101	SEE Tractor	2086
419.102	HME Tractor	13
419.103	HMMH Tractor	164
419.104	HME Tractor	153

Abbreviations:

- SEE: Small Emplacement Excavator
- HME: High Mobility Entrencher
- HMMH: High Mobility Material Handler
