= Mercedes-Benz OM352 engine =

Mercedes-Benz OM 352
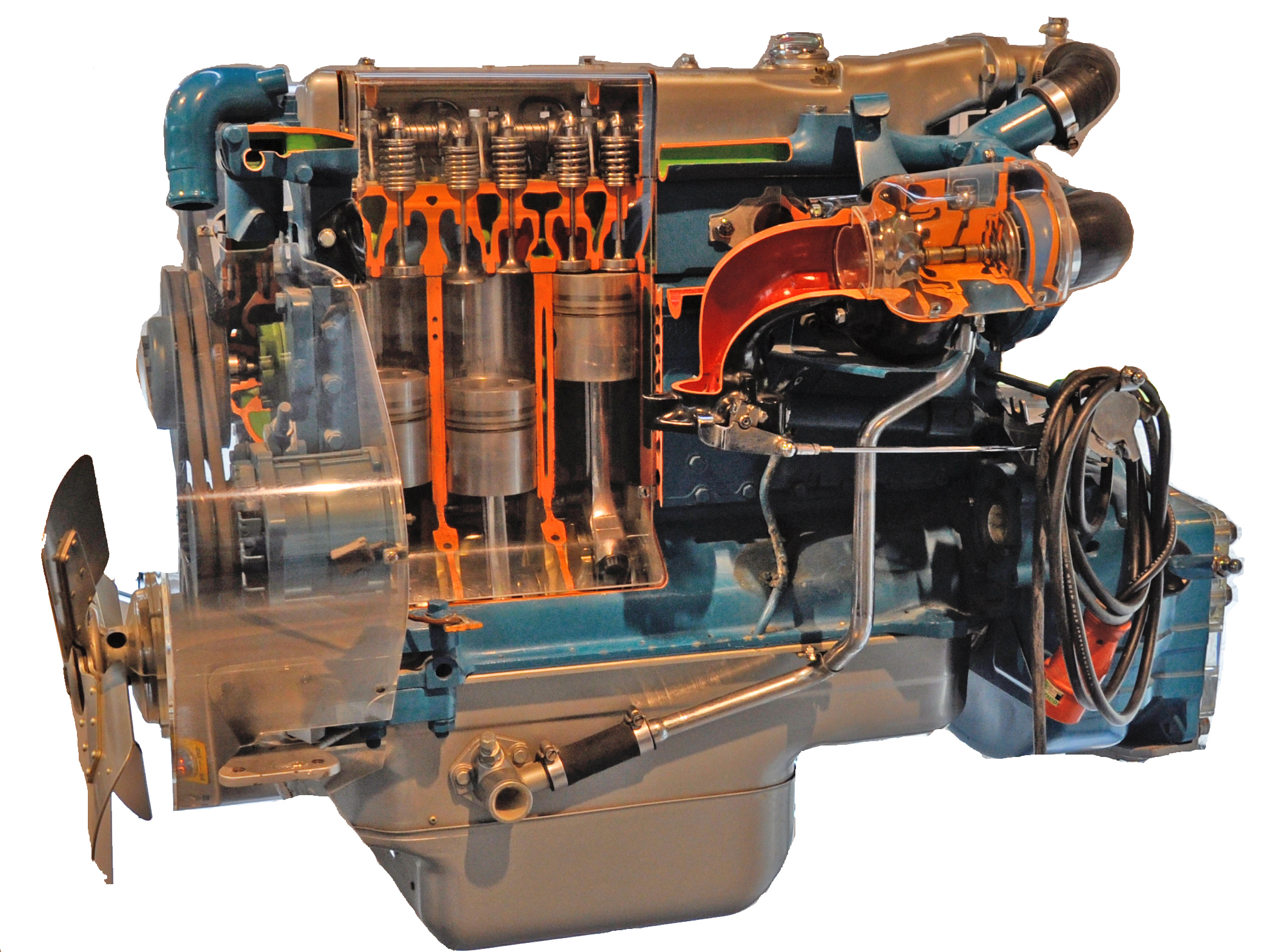
- OM 352 cutaway model on static display at the Unimog Museum Gaggenau.

Overview
- Manufacturer: Daimler-Benz
- Production: 1963-present

Layout
- Configuration: Inline-6
- Displacement: 5.675 L (346 cu in)
- Cylinder bore: 97 mm (3.82 in)
- Piston stroke: 128 mm (5.04 in)
- Cylinder block material: Cast iron
- Cylinder head material: Cast iron
- Compression ratio: 16:1

RPM range
- Idle speed: 700/min

Combustion
- Operating principle: Diesel
- Turbocharger: OM 352: none OM 352 A: Turbocharger; OM 352 LA: Turbocharger and intercooler
- Fuel system: Helix-controlled mechanical injection pump, direct injection
- Fuel type: Diesel fuel (DIN 51601)
- Cooling system: Water-cooled

Output
- Power output: 48–127 kW (65–173 PS; 64–170 hp)

The Mercedes-Benz OM 352 is a 5.7 litre inline-6 cylinder 4-stroke Diesel engine, made by Daimler-Benz.

== Development ==
It is one of many models in the 300 series of engines, which were developed during and after World War II, while specifically the OM352 was revealed in 1964. The OM352's lineage can be traced back to the OM311, itself an 80 PS (59 kW) inline-six engine. The OM352 has many applications, including marine, military, municipal, and agricultural vehicles, as well as stationary settings. The engine has differing trim and power levels, affording designations such as OM 352A a variant fitted with a turbocharger, or the OM352 LA, which is fitted with an intercooler and a turbocharger. (List of Mercedes-Benz engines.)

The engine is water-cooled, and is produced using cast-iron cylinder block, with cast-in cylinders. The engine utilizes diesel fuel delivered in a direct injection method from a Bosch PES style inline injection pump. The cylinder head is a single unit for all cylinders, and the cylinder head cover and air intake are shared by a single cast aluminum alloy. Exhaust ports 2&3 and 4&5 are siamesed together, presenting an exhaust manifold with only four outlets.

The crankshaft is a precision forged unit running in seven three-layer bearings, with counterweights bolted onto the crank webs, much like any other diesel motor of its vintage. The middle bearing is also the thrust bearing. The connecting rods are of a split design, with bronze bushings for the piston pin.

== OM314 ==
In 1965, a four-cylinder variant derived from the six-cylinder OM352 was introduced, the OM314. Typical output for trucks was 59 kW (80 PS), later 63 kW (85 PS).

== Licensed production ==
The OM352 was also one of many Mercedes engines licensed in 1979 for manufacture by Atlantis Diesel Engines (ADE) in South Africa. These were known as ADE 352 and are virtually identical to the Mercedes engines. Recently the OM352 was licensed by Tata Motors for use in their 713S Trucks. These are manufactured by Tata but however have slight differences like the weights no longer being bolted to but rather part of the crank and no holes for oil sprayers in the block. These modifications are likely to reduce complexity and cost of engine production.

Common output power can vary from 92 to 141 kW (125 to 192 PS; 123 to 189 hp) depending on the fuel delivery and air charge options. Higher output can be achieved through special modifications, however engine longevity may be affected with such non-factory modifications.

Improved engines developed after the OM314 and OM352 include the OM364 (4 cylinders) and OM366 (6 cylinders), which look extremely similar in appearance and marked the final stage of development for the 300 series engines due to emissions requirements. Mercedes Benz 900 series engines are the successors of engines such as the OM300 series.

== OM352 variants for the German market ==
Variants for the German market
Rated power (DIN 70020)	48 kW	50 kW	59 kW	62 kW	66 kW	74 kW	81 kW	92 kW	93 kW	96 kW	110 kW	115 kW	124 kW	127 kW
Type designation	OM 352.919	OM 352.902	OM 353.902	OM 353.902	OM 352.xxx	OM 352.xxx	OM 353.901	OM 352.xxx	OM 352.xxx	OM 353.961	OM 352.xxx	OM 352.xxx	OM 352.xxx	OM 352.xxx
Turbocharger	no										yes			
Year	1964	1966	1969	1971	1965	1969	1969	1970	1963	19xx	196x	1966	1979	19xx
Source														

== Technical specifications ==
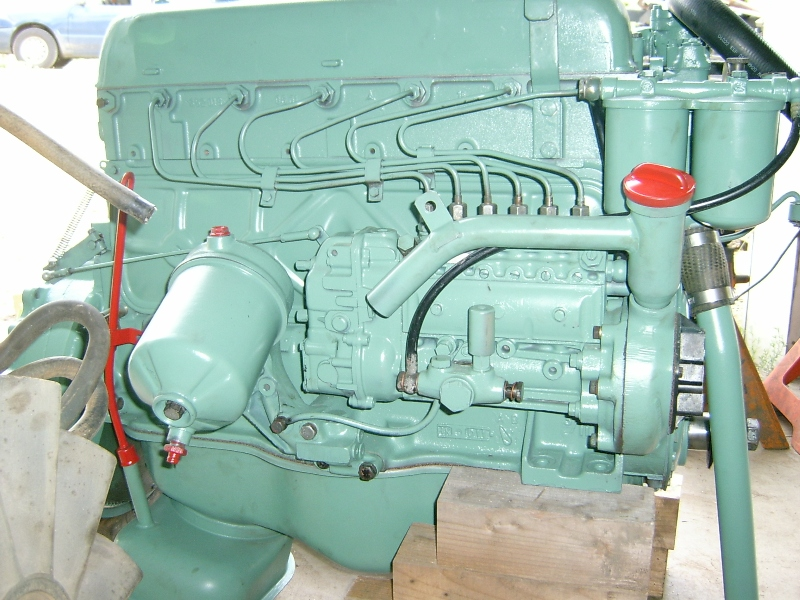
Injection side of engine

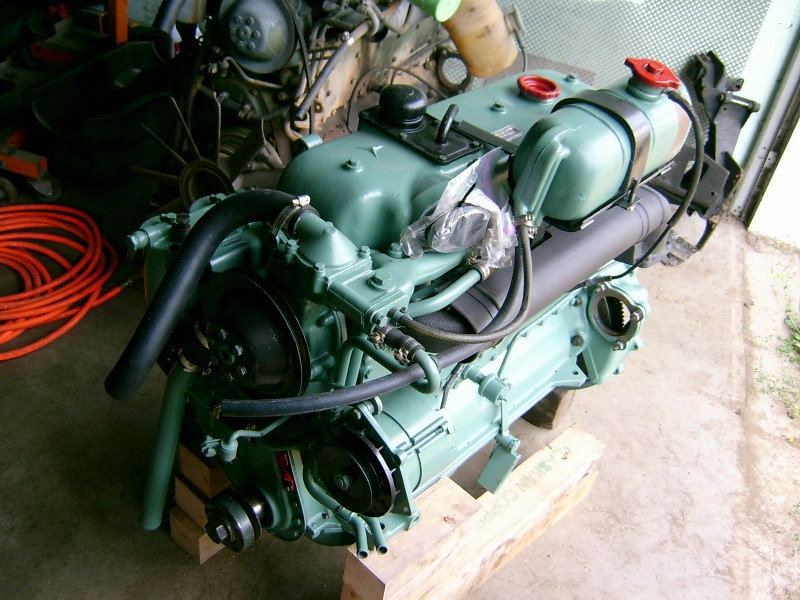
Exhaust side of engine

Model	OM 352	OM 352	OM 352 A	OM 353	OM 352 LA
Year	1964	1966	1975	1975	1979
Vehicle	Unimog 406 (U 65)	Mercedes-Benz L 322 (L 1113)	Unimog 425 (U 1500)	Unimog 435 (U 1300 L)	Mercedes-Benz L 322 (LAF 1113)
Type designation	352.919			353.961	
Configuration	Water-cooled Straight-six				
Operating principle	Diesel				
Valve system	OHV, two valves per cylinder				
Aspiration	Natural		Turbocharged	Natural	Turbocharged and intercooled
Oil system	Wet sump				
Fuel system	Direct injection				
Bore × Stroke	97 mm × 128 mm				
Displacement	5.675 L				
Rated power (DIN 70020)	48 kW (65 PS) at 2550/min	93 kW (126 PS) at 2800/min	110 kW (150 PS) at 2550/min	96 kW (130 PS) at 2800/min	124 kW (169 PS) at 2800/min
Max. torque (DIN 70020)		353 N·m at 1600/min	461 N·m at 1600/min	363 N·m at 1700/min	
Mean effective pressure		784.5 kPa			955 kPa
Mean piston speed		11.95 m/s			
Injection pressure		19.6 MPa		19.6 MPa	
Compression ratio		17 : 1	16 : 1	17 : 1	
Mass		410 kg		460 kg	460 kg
Firing order	1–5–3–6–2–4				
Sump capacity		7–9 L			
Cooling system capacity		24 L			
Alternator		12 V, 0.24 kW			
Source					
