= Mercedes-Benz MB700 =

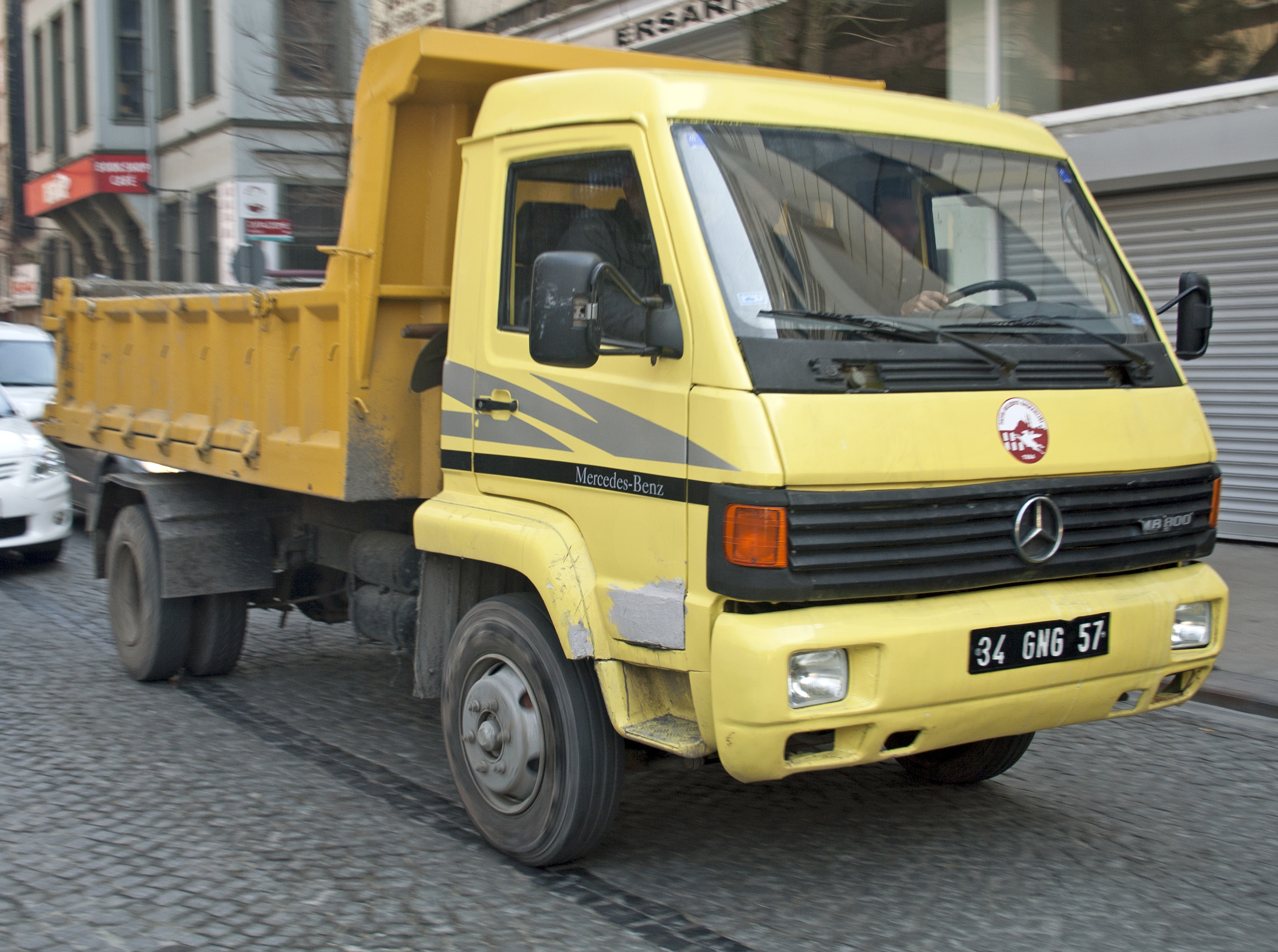
- Mercedes-Benz MB800 (Turkey)

Overview
- Manufacturer: Daimler-Benz
- Production: 1994–2002
- Assembly: Indonesia: Bogor; Turkey: Aksaray; South Africa: Atlantis; Egypt: 6th of October

Body and chassis
- Class: Light commercial vehicle (medium trucks)
- Body style: Cab over chassis truck; Rolling chassis
- Layout: Front mid-engine, rear-wheel-drive
- Related: Mercedes-Benz MB100

Powertrain
- Engine: 3972 cc OM364 I4 (NA & TD)
- Transmission: 5-speed ZF S5-42 manual transmission

Dimensions
- Wheelbase: 3,276 mm (129.0 in) (MB800); 3,800 mm (149.6 in) (MBO800)
- Length: 6,001 mm (236.3 in) (MB800); 6,910 mm (272.0 in) (MBO800)
- Width: 1,977 mm (77.8 in)
- Height: 2,384 mm (93.9 in) (MB800); 1,773 mm (69.8 in) (MBO800)
- Kerb weight: 2,340 kg (5,158.8 lb) (MB800); 2,190 kg (4,828.1 lb) (MBO800)

Chronology
- Predecessor: Mercedes-Benz T2
- Successor: Mercedes-Benz Accelo

The Mercedes-Benz MB700 is a medium-sized cab-over truck designed and produced by PT German Motor Manufacturing in Indonesia since June 1994. The MB700 was specifically designed for the Asian markets. Its rough road capabilities also made it suitable for sale across Africa and the Middle East. It was eventually assembled and sold in several additional countries. The Turkish assembly, by Mercedes-Benz Türk A.Ş, commenced in June 1996. This was also the time that the facelifted MB800 model arrived. The truck was discontinued in 2002.

== MB700 ==
The MB700 is powered by a 4.0-litre Mercedes-Benz OM364 engine in two versions, built under license by Atlantis Diesel Engines (ADE) in South Africa. The naturally aspirated version has 90 PS (89 hp; 66 kW), while the turbodiesel version has 122 PS (120 hp; 90 kW). The transmission was sourced from Spain, and the Indonesian-made cabin was a modified version of the Mercedes-Benz MB100. The front axle came from Tata in India and was considerably wider than that used on the MB100; the rear axle was supplied by Rockwell in the United States. The MB700 was an attempt by Mercedes-Benz to challenge the dominance of the Mitsubishi Colt Diesel in the Indonesian medium truck market, but it did not meet with significant success. A longer wheelbase, bare chassis (MBO700) intended for a bus body was also built.

Sales markets aside from Turkey and Indonesia include North Africa, South Africa, the Middle East, and New Zealand. In 2000, PT German Motor Manufacturing changed its name to "PT DaimlerChrysler Indonesia" following the merger with Chrysler.

== MB800 ==
The facelifted MB800 can be recognized by its more modern, rounded-off appearance and by having the headlights mounted in the bumper rather than in the grille. The interior was also modernized, with a more softly contoured dashboard. Payload is 5 tonnes (11,000 lb) with a gross weight of 8.3-tonne (18,300 lb); the engine remained the same, naturally aspirated or turbocharged diesel as used in the MB700. The longer chassis (MBO800) was available for fitment with bus bodies, although it was not a particularly strong seller. Mercedes-Benz replaced the MBO800 with the slightly larger OF 8000 in 2002. Also, a lighter-duty version called MB500 appeared, using the MB700's interior, the naturally aspirated OM364 diesel engine, and single rear tires.

In its Indonesian home market, neither the MB700 nor the MB800 was able to challenge Colt Diesel's market dominance, however, following the Asian market crash in 1998, sales slowed down even further. Sales in Indonesia dropped from 800 trucks in 1997 to about 200 the following year. 314 examples were exported in 1997, but this increased five-fold in 1998, and Mercedes-Benz aimed to bring that number up to 2,500 eventually. Mercedes-Benz added assemblies in Egypt and Turkey to serve local markets, including North Africa and Eastern Europe, and in early 1999, the MB800 entered production in South Africa. As for the previous generation, the South African variant was rated for a 4.5 tonnes (9,900 lb) payload. However, the possible synergy of using locally sourced engines came to naught as ADE had wrapped up operations by the time the South African assembly started. In the end, only the first 200 trucks built received South African-made engines. Later engines, at least for Turkish-built trucks, were sourced from Brazil. The braking system and the transmission were strengthened to suit sub-Saharan conditions, modifications which were then applied to the Indonesian-built trucks as well.

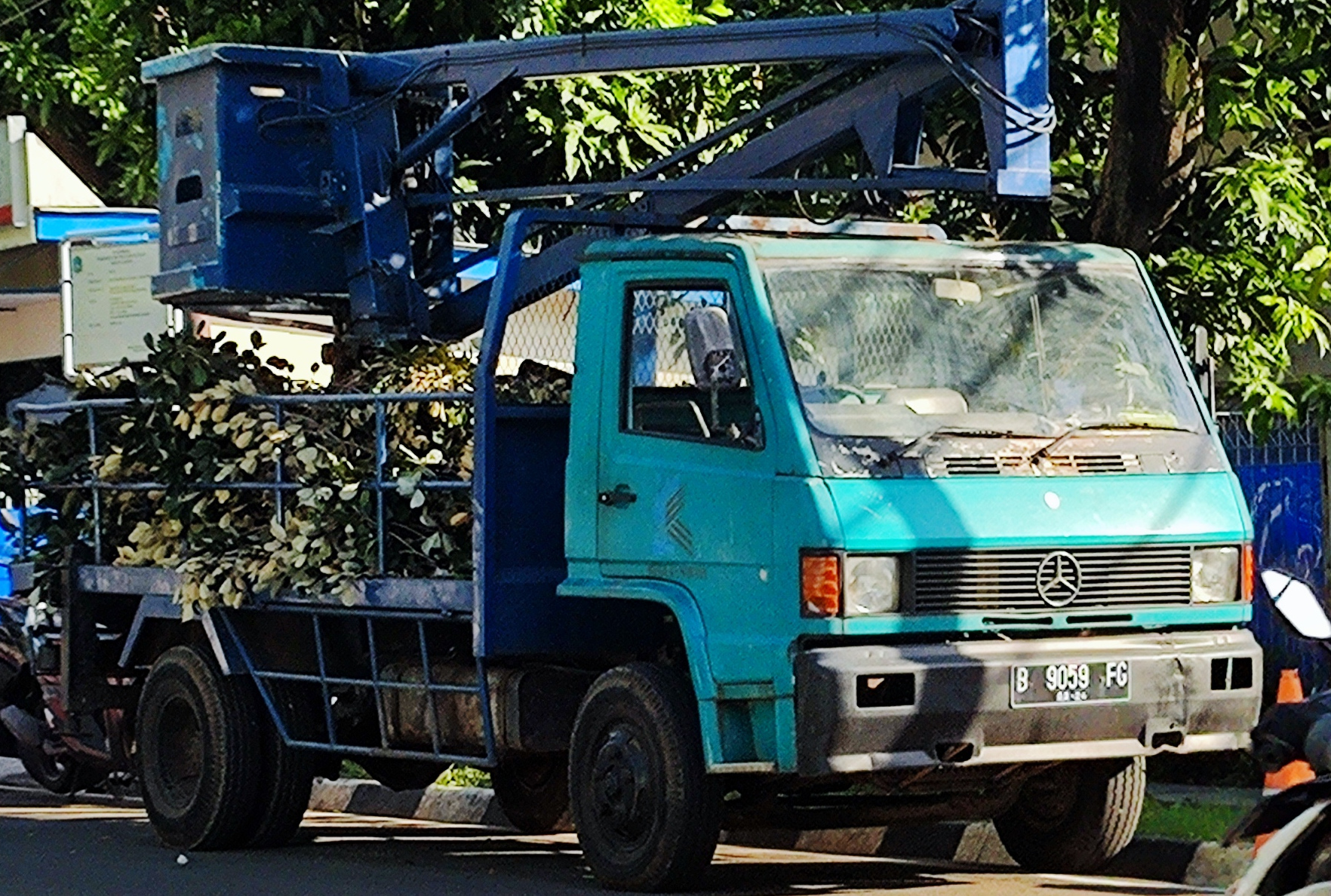
Mercedes-Benz MB700 (Indonesia)
