= Unimog 425 =

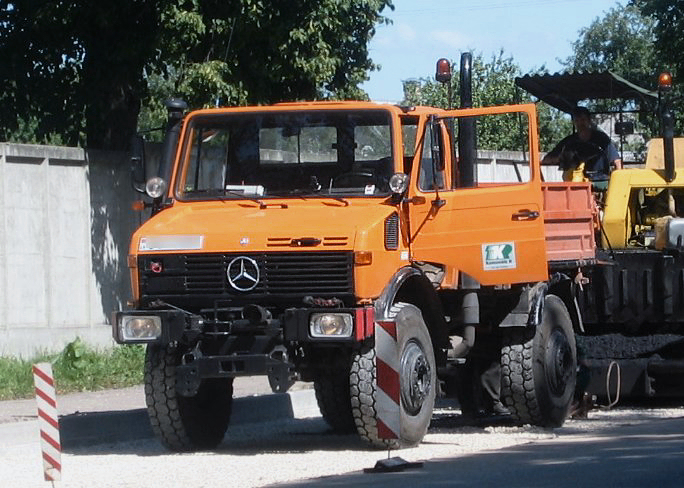
- 425.121

Overview
- Type: Truck
- Manufacturer: Daimler-Benz AG
- Also called: U 1300; U 1500 T U 1500
- Production: 1975–1988
- Assembly: Germany: Gaggenau (Mercedes-Benz Gaggenau plant)

Body and chassis
- Class: Heavy duty tractor
- Related: Unimog 435

Powertrain
- Engine: OM 352 (diesel, 88–110 kW)
- Transmission: UG 3/40-8: 2 × 4 manual; 2 × 4 × 3 manual

Dimensions
- Wheelbase: 2,810 mm (110 5/8 in)
- Length: 4,870 mm (191 3/4 in)
- Width: 2,300 mm (90 1/2 in)
- Height: 2,685 mm (105 3/4 in)
- Kerb weight: 5,940 kg (13,100 lb)

Chronology
- Successor: Unimog 427

The Unimog 425 is the first series production heavy duty Unimog series, made by Daimler-Benz AG from 1975 to 1988 in the Mercedes-Benz Gaggenau plant, alongside the long-wheelbase model Unimog 435. It was first presented to the public on the 1974 DLG show in Frankfurt, then named Unimog U 120, indicating a power output of 120 PS (88.3 kW; 118.4 hp). However, series production models were equipped with 125 PS (92 kW; 123 hp) or 150 PS (110 kW; 148 hp) engines, and therefore called U 1300 and U 1500. Daimler-Benz made three types of the Unimog 425, and a total number of 3135 were built, making the 425 much rarer compared to the longer wheelbase, but otherwise similar Unimog 435, of which more than 30,000 were built. The 425 was the first Unimog to feature the "edgy cab", which is still used in the Unimog today.

== Technical description ==
The Unimog 425 is a two-axle lorry with a downswept ladder frame and rear-wheel drive. Front-wheel drive can be manually enabled. Both axles are coil-sprung, live, portal axles, with panhard rods, torque tubes, and hydraulic shock absorbers. All four wheels have the same size; the braking system is a pneumatic, dual-circuit system with disc brakes on all wheels. A trailer braking system was available as a factory option. For powering (farm) implements, the 425 has two switchable (540 and 1000/min) PTO shafts, and a hydraulic rear three-point linkage. The steering is hydraulically power-assisted. Daimler-Benz offered only one engine, the turbocharged Mercedes-Benz OM 352 diesel engine.

The torque is transmitted from the engine to the wheels through a dry single-disc clutch, and synchronised UG 3/40-8 gearbox. It has four gears and an additional planetary two-speed box, resulting in eight total gears. The gearbox shifts its gears pneumatically, and has a single gear leaver with a traditional H-shift pattern for all eight gears. When shifting from fourth into fifth, the main gearbox shifts from its fourth gear into its first gear, and the planetary gearbox shifts from its first into its second gear. There is no reverse gear on the UG 3/40–8 gearbox, instead, the Unimog 425 has an additional gearbox just for reversing. The reduction is only 1 : 1.03, meaning that, given a top speed of 85 km/h (53 mph), the maximum reverse speed exceeds 80 km/h (50 mph). Therefore, the planetary gearbox's second group can be locked to prevent drivers from reversing at very high speeds.

Daimler-Benz offered another gearbox option for agricultural customers. The agricultural extra gearbox is a planetary gearbox with three gears, regular, field, and crawler, thus resulting in 2×4×3=24 gears. Unimog 425 with the agricultural gearbox option have a pneumatic dual-clutch transmission instead of the dry single-disc clutch.

== Unimog 425 types ==
Unimog 425 types
Type	Model name	Cab style	Wheelbase	Engine power	Number built
425.121	U 1300	Closed cab	2,810 mm (110 5/8 in)	88 kW (118 hp), 92 kW (123 hp)	1063
425.131	U 1500 T	OEM part (half Unimog without rear), closed cab	2,810 mm (110 5/8 in)	110 kW (148 hp)	282
425.141	U 1500	Closed cab	2,810 mm (110 5/8 in)	110 kW (148 hp)	1790

== Technical specifications ==
Technical specifications for type 425.141
	U 1500
Production years	1975–1988
Mass	5,940 kg (13,100 lb)
Length	4,870 mm (191 3/4 in)
Width	2,300 mm (90 9/16 in)
Height	2,685 mm (105 11/16 in)
Wheelbase	2,810 mm (110 5/8 in)
Track width	1,840 mm (72 7/16 in)
Ground clearance	500 mm (19 11/16 in)
Turning diameter	13 m (42.65 ft)
Tyres	16–70/24″
Engine type	OM 352
Engine layout	Water-cooled, straight-six, diesel engine
Injection system	Helix-controlled direct injection with inline injection pump
Displacement	5,675 cm^{3} (346.3 cu in)
Bore × Stroke	97 mm × 128 mm (3.82 in × 5.04 in)
Compression ratio	16 : 1
Rated power (DIN 70020)	110 kW (150 PS; 148 hp) at 2,550 rpm
Max. torque (DIN 70020)	461 N⋅m (47.0 kp⋅m; 340 lb⋅ft) at 1,600 rpm
Top speed	85 km/h (53 mph)
Source	
