= Unimog 437 =

Unimog 437. 1
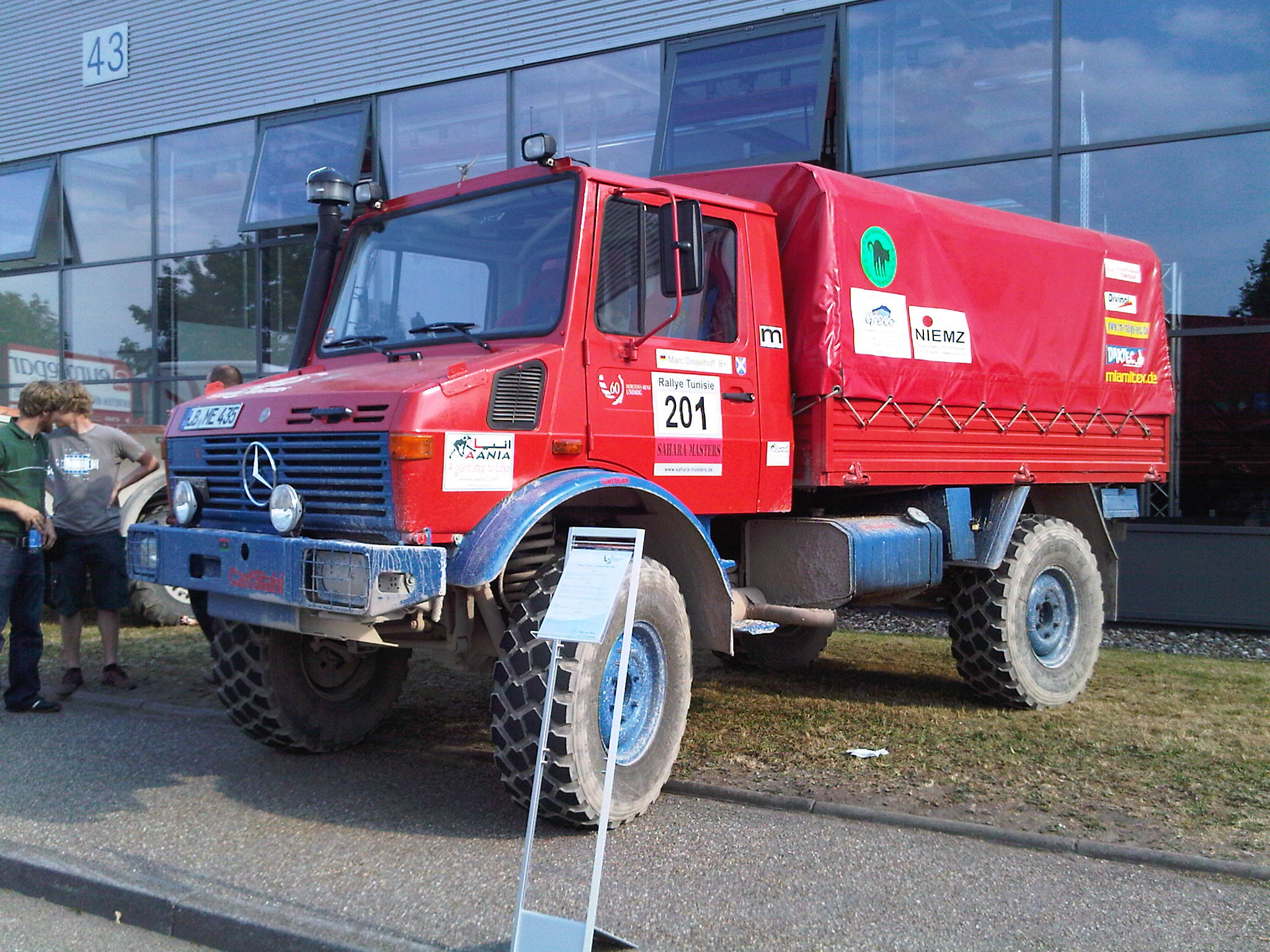
- Unimog 437.1

Overview
- Type: Truck
- Manufacturer: Daimler-Benz AG (1988–1998); DaimlerChrysler AG (1998–2007); Daimler AG (2007–2019); Daimler Truck (2019–present)
- Production: 1988–present
- Assembly: Germany: Gaggenau

Body and chassis
- Class: 7,5 t truck

Powertrain
- Transmission: 8-speed manual

Chronology
- Predecessor: Unimog 435

The Unimog 437.1 is a medium-heavy truck of the Unimog series by Mercedes-Benz.

The first generation, the 437.1 was built from 1988 until 2003. It replaced the 425 and 435, the basic structure of which was retained on the Unimog 437.1. With 28 different models, the 437.1 series is the most comprehensive Unimog series. A total of 10,718 vehicles were produced. For the first time there was also a standard three-axle model.

The second and current generation, the 437.4 was introduced in August 2002 by Daimler AG at the Mercedes-Benz plant in Wörth. The vehicle was presented at the IAA 2002 in Hanover. In the Unimog series, the 437.4 belongs to the previously heavy-duty, off-road class, whose 1974 appearance of the angular driver's cab has been retained in the Unimog 437.4 until today. In 2013, the 437.4 series underwent a comprehensive facelift. In the first ten years of production, 6,497 vehicles were produced in twelve models. The Dingo 2 is also built on the chassis of the Unimog 437.4. The model designation of the Unimog 437.4 is no longer based on the engine power in DIN-PS, instead, as in the Unimog 405 numbers (U 3000, U 4000, U 5000) were used.
