= Mercedes-Benz OM364 engine =

Type of internal combustion engine

The Mercedes-Benz OM364 is a 4.0 liter (3,972cc) Inline-four engine (I4) Overhead valve (OHV) diesel engine with 2 valves per cylinder. It is related to the Straight-six engine OM366 engine which has two extra cylinders, while the bore and stroke remain unchanged.

It launched in 1983 and was first utilized in the Mercedes-Benz LK followed by the second generation Mercedes-Benz T2. Other applications include the MB-trac, the Mercedes-Benz MB800 and industrial engines. MTU Friedrichshafen sold the engine under the ??? label. The engine had a Direct injection system (inline fuel pump) to deliver fuel to every cylinder. Naturally aspirated and turbocharged versions with and without intercooler existed. Only the turbocharged and intercooled version became EURO II capable from 1994 onwards. A twin-scroll turbocharger was utilized giving ~0.9-1atm of boost.

Engine Details
| Power: | 63-103 kW (86-140 hp) @ 2,600-2,800 rpm | Height: | - |
| Torque: | 254-500 Nm (187-369 lb.ft) @ 1,200-2,800 rpm | Weight: | - |
| Aspiration: | Naturally aspirated or Turbocharged or Twin-scroll turbocharger with intercooler | Injection: | Direct injection |
| Compression Ratio: | 16.5-17.25 | Boost: | 0.9-1 |
| Bore: | 97.5mm (3.8in) | Launch year: | 1983 |
| Stroke: | 133mm (5.2in) | | |
| Displacement: | 3,972cc (242CI) | | |
| Redline: | 2,800 rpm | | |
| Length: | - | | |
| Width: | - | | |

== See also ==
- List of Mercedes-Benz engines
