= Unimog 435 =

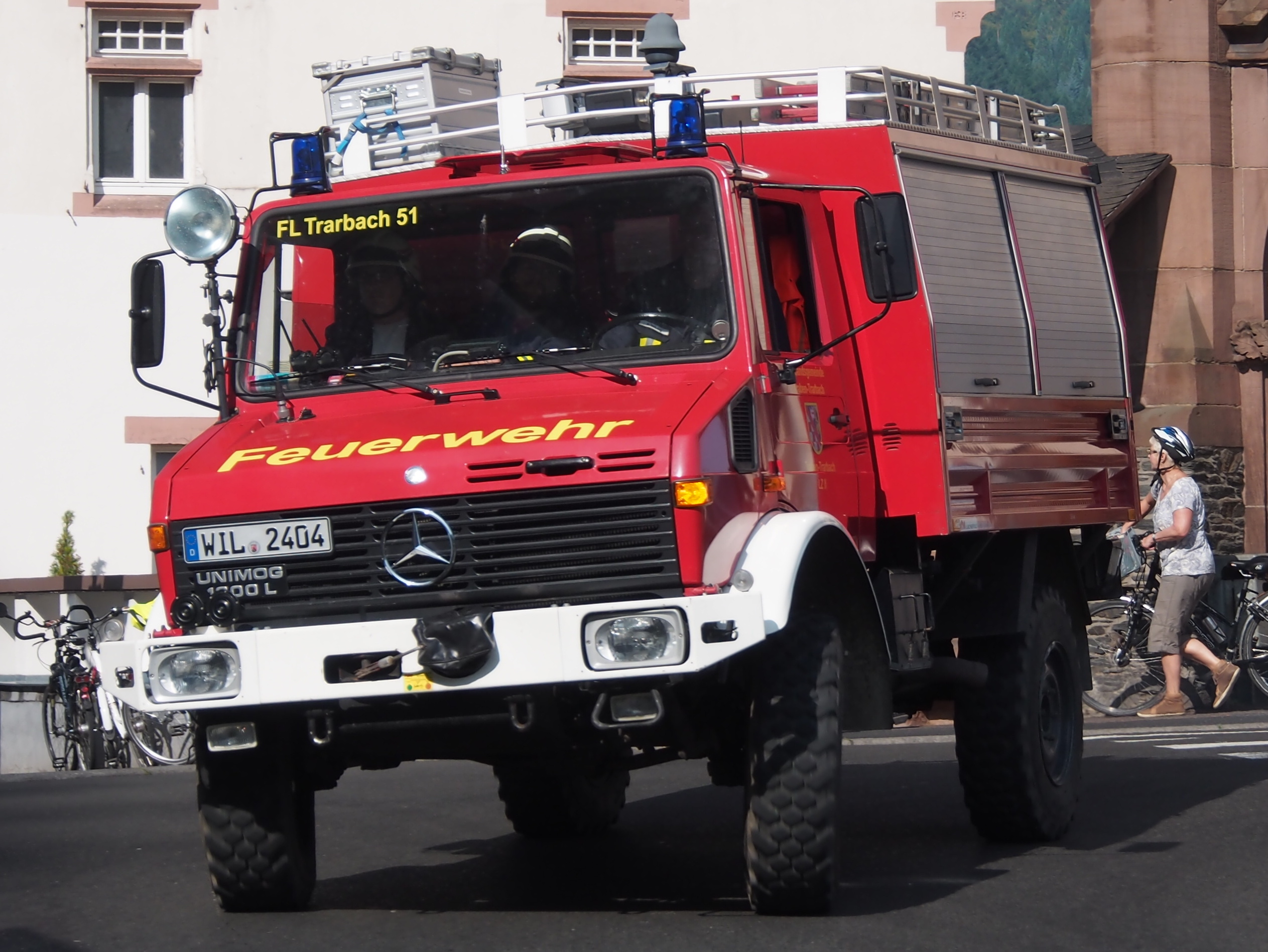
- Unimog U-1300-L-based RW1 fire engine (435.115)

Overview
- Type: Truck
- Manufacturer: Daimler-Benz
- Also called: Unimog U 1300 L Unimog U 1700 L
- Production: 1975–1993
- Assembly: Germany: Gaggenau

Body and chassis
- Class: 7,5 t truck
- Related: Unimog 436

Powertrain
- Engine: Mercedes-Benz OM 353.959; Mercedes-Benz OM 353.961; Mercedes-Benz OM 366
- Transmission: 8-speed manual

Dimensions
- Wheelbase: 3,250–3,850 mm (128–151 5/8 in)
- Length: 5.500–6,100 mm (1/4–240 1/8 in)
- Width: 2,300 mm (90 1/2 in)
- Height: 2,875 mm (113 1/4 in)
- Kerb weight: 4.5–5.5 t (4.4–5.4 long tons; 5.0–6.1 short tons)

Chronology
- Predecessor: none
- Successor: Unimog 437

The Unimog 435 is a vehicle of the Unimog-series by Mercedes-Benz. 30,726 vehicles were produced from 1975 to 1993 in eight different variants in the Mercedes-Benz Unimog-plant in Gaggenau. The vehicles were sold as Unimog U 1300 L and Unimog U 1700 L. Best selling vehicle was the U 1300 L, which was built as a special vehicle for the Bundeswehr and the German fire department often. The successor Unimog 437 with a similar appearance is still in production. The Unimog 436, which is produced in Turkey, was initially based on the Unimog 435. It is also available with a convertible cab, while the Unimog 435 comes always with a full cab. The names of Unimog-modells may create confusion, the U 1300 belongs to the Unimog 425-series, while the U 1300 L belongs to the Unimog 435-series.

== Description ==
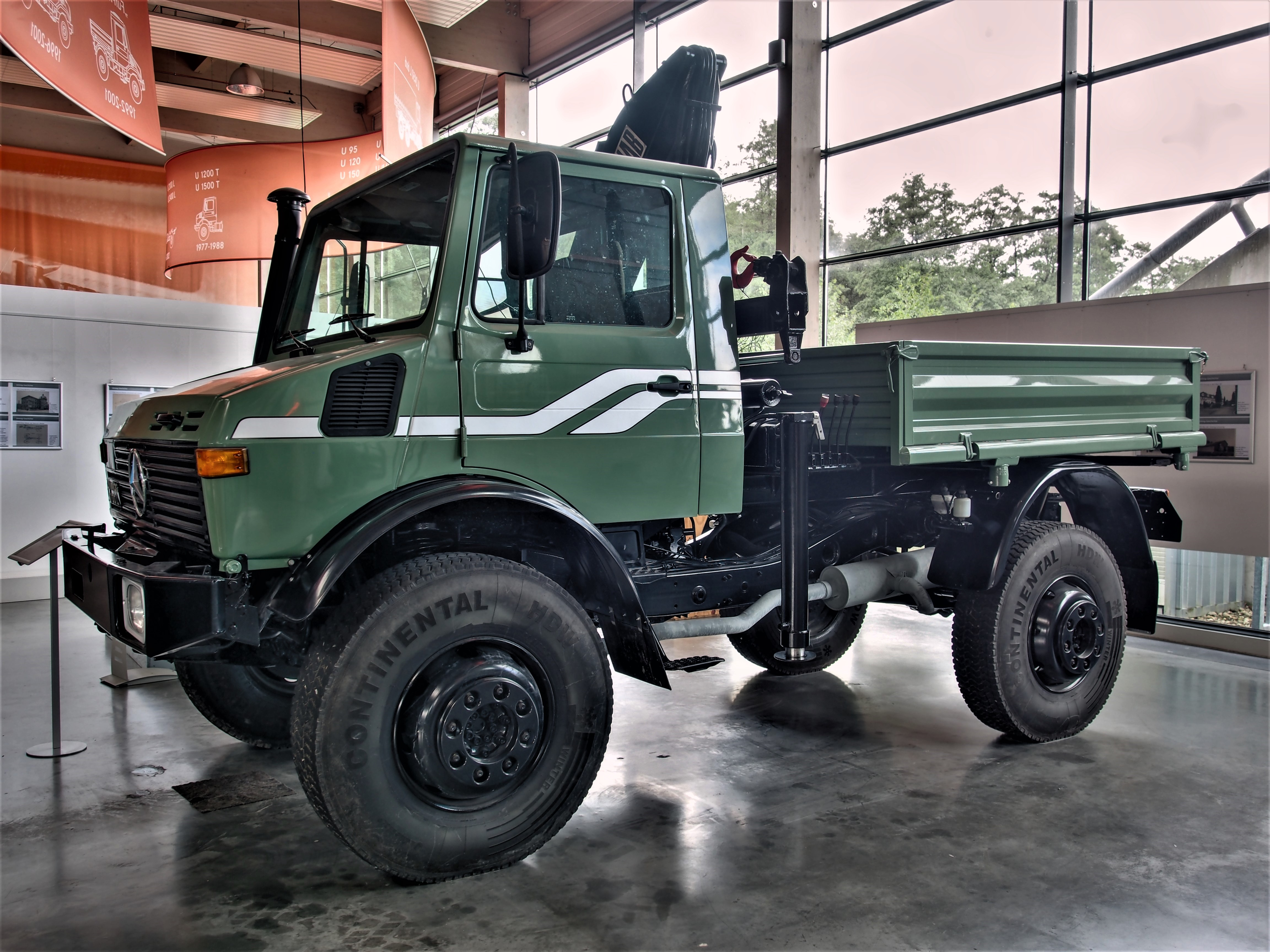
Unimog U 1700 L (435.111) on static display at the Unimog museum in Gaggenau

The Unimog 435 belongs to the heavy duty Unimog series which started with the Unimog 425. Compared with the Unimog 425, the 435 has a longer wheelbase and more powerful engines. Just as the 425, it has the "edgy" cab (425.820), and is designed as a 7,5-ton truck. Like other Unimogs it has a ladder frame, portal axles and coil springs. The Unimog 435 was built with two different wheelbases, 3,250 mm (128 in) and 3,850 mm (152 in). It is a rear wheel drive vehicle with selectable four wheel drive (part time four-wheel drive). The gearbox is a fully synchronized 8-speed manual gearbox with lockable differentials. A reduction gear and a crawler gear were available as additional accessory. Depending on the built in gear box and portal axle final drive ratio the top speed is between 80 and 100 km/h (50 and 62 mph). The brake system uses compressed air to activate the dual hydraulic circuit disc brakes. A compressed air trailer brake system was an additional accessory. An engine brake was available as well. The Unimog 435 uses hydraulic power steering. The engines in the Unimog 435 are naturally aspirated or turbocharged Mercedes-Benz OM 353 series engines. Starting in 1987 Mercedes-Benz used the OM 366 engine instead.

=== Types' designations ===
The Unimog 435 was made in eight different types, with the 435.115 type being by far the most common Unimog 435, with 21,775 units built. In total, 473 units of the 435.115 type were built as RW1 fire engines (as depicted in the infobox).

Types' designation	Model designation	Wheelbase	Number built	Engine	Power output
435.110	U 1700	3250 mm	1161	OM 353	124 kW
435.111	U 1700 L	3250 mm	808	OM 353	124 kW
435.113	U 1700 L/38	3850 mm	5898	(OM 352); OM 353	110/124 kW
435.115	U 1300 L	3250 mm	21,775	OM 353 (OM 352) (OM 366); OM 353	96/110/115/124 kW
435.117	U 1300 L/37	3700 mm	779	OM 353 (OM 352); OM 353	96/110/124 kW
435.160	Thyssen TM 170	3250 mm	290	OM 353	124 kW
435.161	Thyssen TM 215	3250 mm	15	OM 366	157 kW
435.170	Thyssen Condor	3275 mm		OM 353 (OM 366)	124/170 kW

=== Technical specifications ===
	U 1300 L	U 1700 L
Production	1975–1987	1975-1993
Engine	Inline six-cylinder diesel engine with direct injection	
Engine supercharging	None	Turbocharger, no intercooler
Engine model	OM 353.959	OM 353.961 A
Bore × Stroke, Displacement	97 mm × 128 mm (3.82 in × 5.04 in); 5,675 cm^{3} (346.3 cu in)	
Rated power	96 kW (131 PS; 129 hp)	124 kW (169 PS; 166 hp)
max. Torque	363 N⋅m (268 lbf⋅ft)	520 N⋅m (380 lbf⋅ft)
Gearbox	8-speed manual	
Propulsion	Rear wheel drive with selectable all wheel drive	
Vmax,	80–110 km/h (50–68 mph)	
Fuel consumption	17.5–19 L/100 km (16.1–14.9 mpg_{‑imp}; 13.4–12.4 mpg_{‑US})	20–22 L/100 km (14–13 mpg_{‑imp}; 12–11 mpg_{‑US})
Turning radius	14,100 mm (46.26 ft)	
Approach angle	46°	
Departure angle	51°	
Ground clearance	440 mm (17 3/8 in)	
Fording depth	1.200 m (3.94 ft)	
