= Atlantis Diesel Engines =

Coordinates: 33.599322°S 18.476182°E

Atlantis Diesel Engines(Pty) Ltd - Manufacturing and Engineering
- Industry: Manufacturing
- Founded: 1979
- Founder: Government of South Africa
- Headquarters: Germiston, Gauteng, South Africa
- Area served: Worldwide
- Products: Diesel engines

Atlantis Diesel Engines/ Engineering (ADE) is a South African manufacturer of diesel engines and components, notably for the mining, on and off road applications as well as defense force industries. The company operates from Germiston, Gauteng, South Africa.

== History ==
The company was started by the Government of South Africa following the imposition of United Nations Security Council Resolution 418. The company was licensed in 1979 to manufacture Mercedes-Benz and Perkins diesel engines, which were primarily destined for military vehicles such as the Ratel IFV, Buffel, Casspir and SAMIL Trucks. The original ADE ceased in 1999 due to insolvency, and was reopened in 2009 by a group of private shareholders. OEM engines and parts including Mercedes/ MAN/ CAT/ BELL/ MTU are distributed by ADE.
