= Mercedes-Benz OM366 engine =

Six-liter diesel engine by Mercedes-Benz from 1983

Mercedes-Benz OM366

Overview
- Manufacturer: Mercedes-Benz
- Production: 1983-

Layout
- Configuration: Straight-six
- Displacement: 5,958 cc (363.6 cu in)
- Cylinder bore: 97.5 mm (3.84 in)
- Piston stroke: 133 mm (5.2 in)
- Compression ratio: 16.5:1-17.25:1

RPM range
- Max. engine speed: 2,800 rpm

Combustion
- Turbocharger: Twin-scroll with intercooler
- Fuel system: Direct injection

Output
- Power output: 100–150 kW; 130–200 hp
- Torque output: 402–640 N⋅m; 296–472 lb⋅ft

Dimensions
- Dry weight: 445–470 kg (981–1,036 lb)

The Mercedes-Benz OM366 is a 6.0-liter (5,958 cc) straight-6 overhead valve (OHV) diesel engine with 2 valves per cylinder. It is related to the straight-4 OM364 engine which has two cylinders removed, while the bore and stroke remain unchanged.

It launched in 1983 and had a direct injection system (inline fuel pump) to deliver fuel to every cylinder. It used a twin-scroll turbocharger, giving approximately 0.6–0.8 atm (8.8–11.8 psi) of boost.

== See also ==
- List of Mercedes-Benz engines
