= Unimog 411 =

Vehicle in the Unimog series from Mercedes-Benz

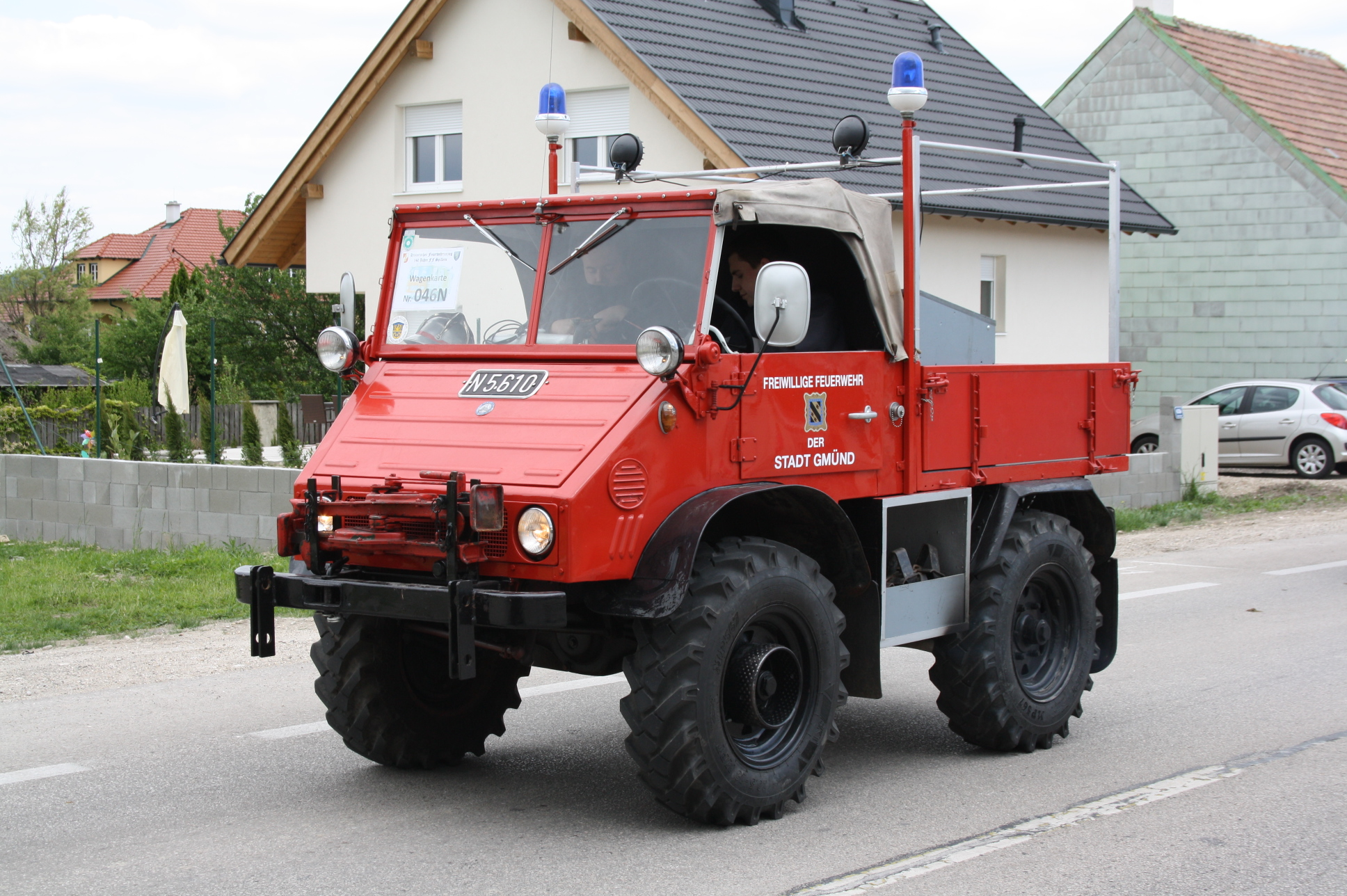

Overview
- Type: Tractor
- Manufacturer: Daimler-Benz AG
- Production: August 1956 – October 1974
- Assembly: Germany: Gaggenau (Mercedes-Benz Gaggenau plant)

Powertrain
- Engine: 1767 cm³ OM 636 (diesel)
- Transmission: 6-speed manual gearbox

Chronology
- Predecessor: Unimog 401
- Successor: Unimog 406

The Unimog 411 is a vehicle in the Unimog series from Mercedes-Benz. Daimler-Benz AG built 39,581 units at the Mercedes-Benz plant in Gaggenau between August 1956 and October 1974. The 411 is the last series of the "original Unimogs". The design of the 411 is based on the Unimog 401. It is also a commercial vehicle built on a ladder frame with four equally sized wheels and designed as an implement carrier, agricultural tractor and universally applicable work machine. Like the 401, it had a passenger car engine, initially with 30 hp (22 kW).

There were a total of twelve different models of the 411, which were offered in numerous model variants with three wheelbases (1720 mm, 2120 mm and 2570 mm) and could be supplied in the conventional convertible version, as a drive head and with a closed cab, which was manufactured by Westfalia as with the predecessor. The closed cab was available in two versions, the Type B resembled the cab of the Unimog 401, the Type DvF resembled the cabs of the Mercedes-Benz trucks of the 1950s and 1960s with headlights in the radiator grille and chrome strips.

During its long production phase, the Unimog 411 was technically revised several times. Due to the large number of changes that the 411 series underwent, four types of the 411 series are distinguished for better differentiation: the Ur-411, 411a, 411b and 411c. Although the 411 was technically based on the 401, design features from other Unimog model series were also adopted for the 411, including the axle design of the Baureihe 406, which was used in modified form on the 411 from 1963. As the last classic Unimog, the 411 had no direct successor, but from 1966 the Unimog 421 was in the Unimog range, which was technically based on the 411 and was positioned in the same product segment.

== Vehicle history ==
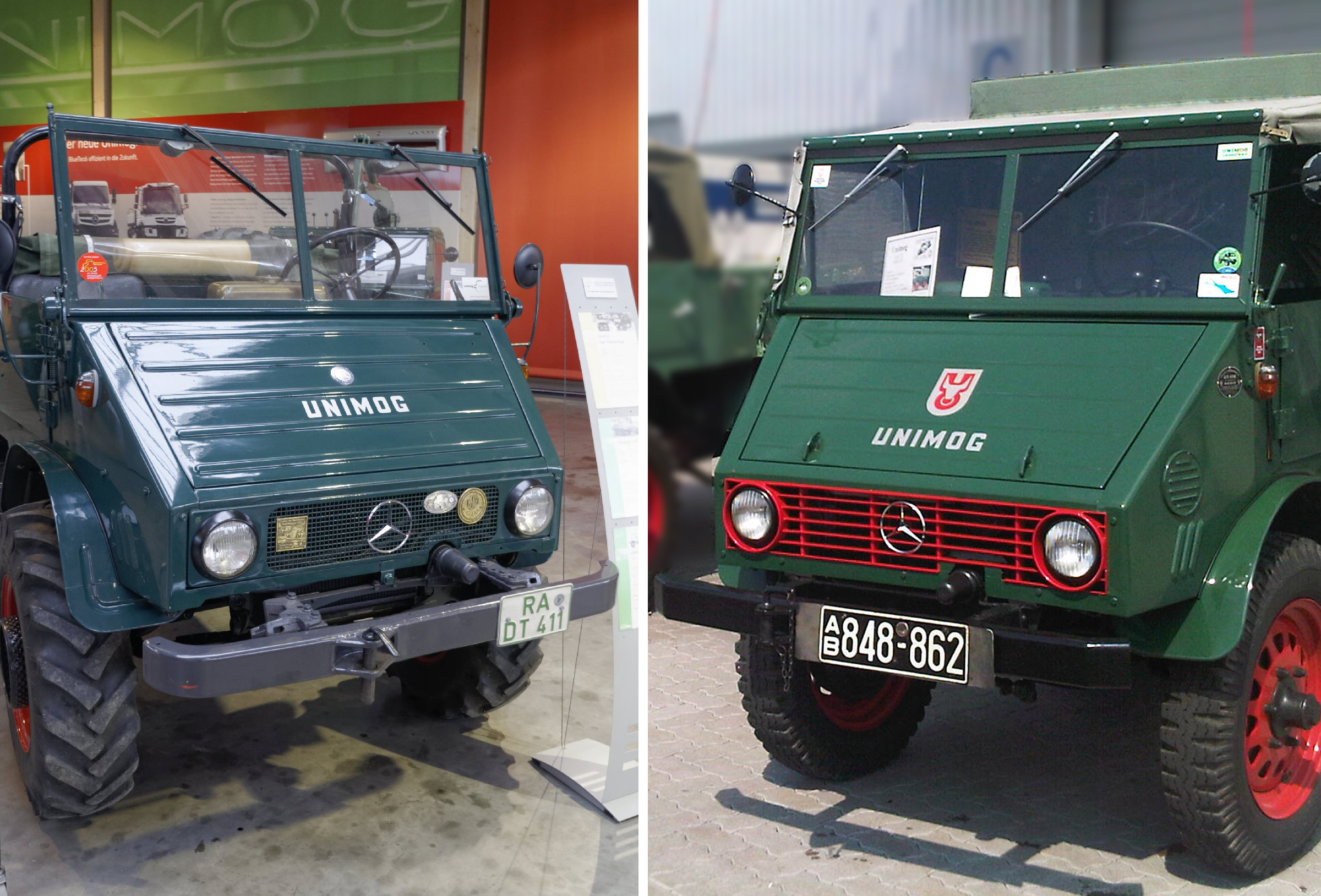
'Links: Unimog 411c, Baujahr 1966'. Right: Unimog 401Immediately recognizable difference: The radiator grille of the 411 is narrower and painted in the vehicle color. (If you click on the picture, you can call up a more detailed description of the individual differences).

=== Development ===
The Unimog 411 was not a completely new development, rather Daimler-Benz derived the 411 series from the predecessor 401 and 402 series. In the 1950s, the Unimog design department under the leadership of Heinrich Rößler took a wait-and-see approach to new developments, even though consideration was given to offering the Unimog 411 with a 40 hp (29.5 kW) diesel engine and an 80 hp (59 kW) petrol engine. However, these ideas were only implemented in later model series. The developers' hopes were pinned in particular on the 411 with an all-steel cab. The most important focus of the development department was primarily on demonstrating, testing and improving the Unimog as such. The main changes to the 411 compared to its predecessor were an increase in engine output by 20%, reinforced shock absorbers, reinforced crossmembers for the engine, from 1959 plain bearings instead of roller bearings for the manual gearbox and enlarged tires with the dimension 7.5-18″ (optional equipment: 10-18″), which made a new wheel arch necessary; on the 411, the front wheel arches are slightly longer at the top than on the 401, so that the tires do not drag when turning the steering wheel. In addition, the front end of the 411 was redesigned, with wider beading on the hood. The radiator grille was also made smaller; it was now a square grille painted in the vehicle color instead of the struts of its predecessor.

Series 401 convertibles were already equipped with the cab of the later 411 series from June 1955, so that there are some hybrid vehicles. The 411 was then presented at the DLG exhibition in Hanover in September 1956. As many changes were made to the Unimog 411 during the entire period of series production, the Daimler-Benz works literature divides the 411 series into four types to make it easier to distinguish between significant technical changes: the original type "411" (1956-1961), "411a" (1961-1963), "411b" (1963-1965) and "411c" (1965-1974).

With the Unimog 411, Daimler-Benz set itself the target of selling 4,000 vehicles a year. In order to meet the requirements of the Unimog 411, customer wishes were incorporated and taken into account in the further development of the series. Nevertheless, the 411 was more of a small vehicle with an output of just 34 hp (25 kW) powerful diesel engine, which was considered too underpowered for some applications. Analysts at Daimler-Benz warned that the annual production rate of the Unimog 411 would fall below 3000 vehicles after 1960. This point was reached in 1964. Daimler-Benz therefore introduced a larger Unimog in 1963, the 406. The 411 was thus transformed from the former core product of the Unimog range into a light series. However, the further development of the Unimog 411 did not end there; from 1963, the axles of the Unimog 406 were also fitted to the 411 in a modified form. These axles are more stable, cheaper and easier to maintain. From 1967, the 411 received the same bumper as the Unimog 421.

After the introduction of the type 411c in 1965, the 411 series was no longer developed further on a large scale; the models with an extra-long wheelbase were the last major innovation to be added to the Unimog model range for the export market from 1969. In March 1966, the Unimog 421, a technically similar vehicle with a much more modern appearance, was presented in the same segment. The 421, which had the technology of the Unimog 411 and a 2-liter pre-chamber engine of the type OM 621 with 40 hp (29.5 kW), was actually designed as an inexpensive addition to the 406 series, But from 1970 onwards, the Unimog 421 was already much more popular than the similar but older and weaker 411 and was preferred by customers. Dhe Unimog 411 continued to be built unchanged. Production was only discontinued in October 1974 after 39,581 vehicles. Presumably some vehicles were produced again in 1975 for a military customer.

=== Distribution ===
On the West German market, the basic version of the Unimog 411 cost DM 12,500 as a convertible when it was launched in 1956. It initially had the OM 636.914 engine, which produced 30 DIN hp (22 kW) at 2550 rpm. As the Unimog 411 was too expensive for some customers, an "economy model" was offered from 1957 to 1959, the U 25. The U 25 was given the independent model number 411.116. It lacked the windscreen, side windows, windscreen wipers, soft top and other small parts, the seats and engine came from the Unimog 2010, and the transmission ratio of the portal axle was also changed. It was a failure, only 54 units were sold. At the end of the 1950s, the 411 model series was also exported to the USA, where Curtiss-Wright sold the 411.112 and 411.117 models; the Mercedes-Benz brand name was retained. In 1965, the basic version cost 15,300 DM. Daimler-Benz AG achieved the largest turnover with Unimog sales in West Germany. In 1962, worldwide sales of the U 411, excluding the spare parts business, amounted to 54,870,000 DM.

=== Prototype for the French army ===
At the request of the French army Daimler-Benz built a prototype based on the 411 series with a gasoline engine in 1957. The vehicle was given the chassis number 411.114 75 00939 and was assigned to type 411.114, which was reassigned to the extra-long wheelbase models in 1969. The prototype 411.114 had the long wheelbase of 2120 mm, transmission and clutch of the Unimog S and tires of dimension 7.5-18″. The desired and installed four-cylinder engine was the M 121 with a displacement of 1897 cm³ and an output of 65 hp (48 kW) at 4500 min-1 as well as a maximum torque of 128 N-m at 2200 min-1, as it was also used in the Mercedes 180. The top speed is 90 km/h. The reinforced windshield with the windshield wipers at the bottom is a distinctive feature. The French army tested the vehicle over a period of almost 9000 operating hours and decided not to procure it due to its high center of gravity. On the basis of this prototype, Daimler-Benz developed further military vehicles with a payload of one ton.

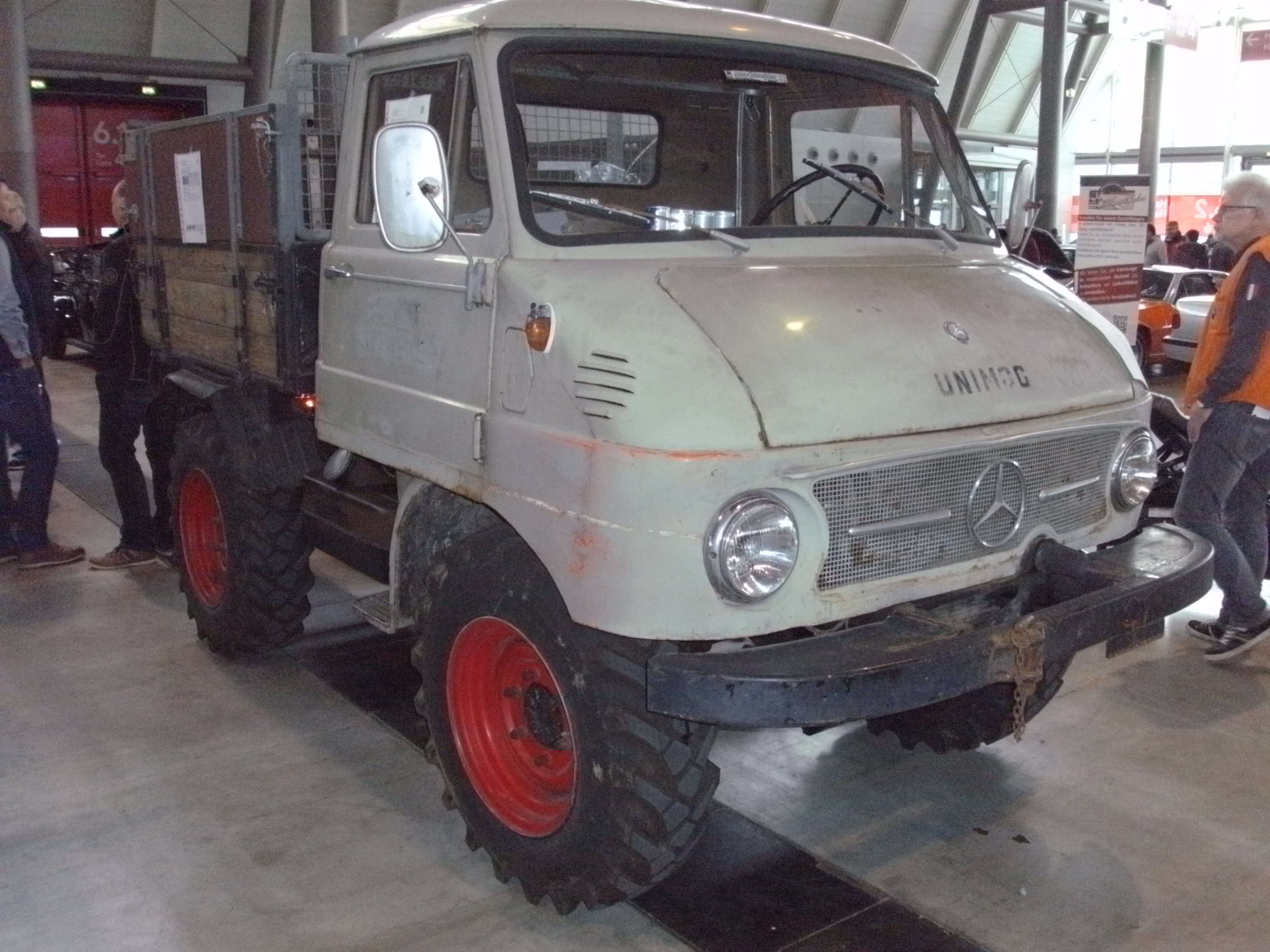
Unimog 411.120, Year of construction 1966, Westfalia cab type DvF. power: 34 hp (25 kW)

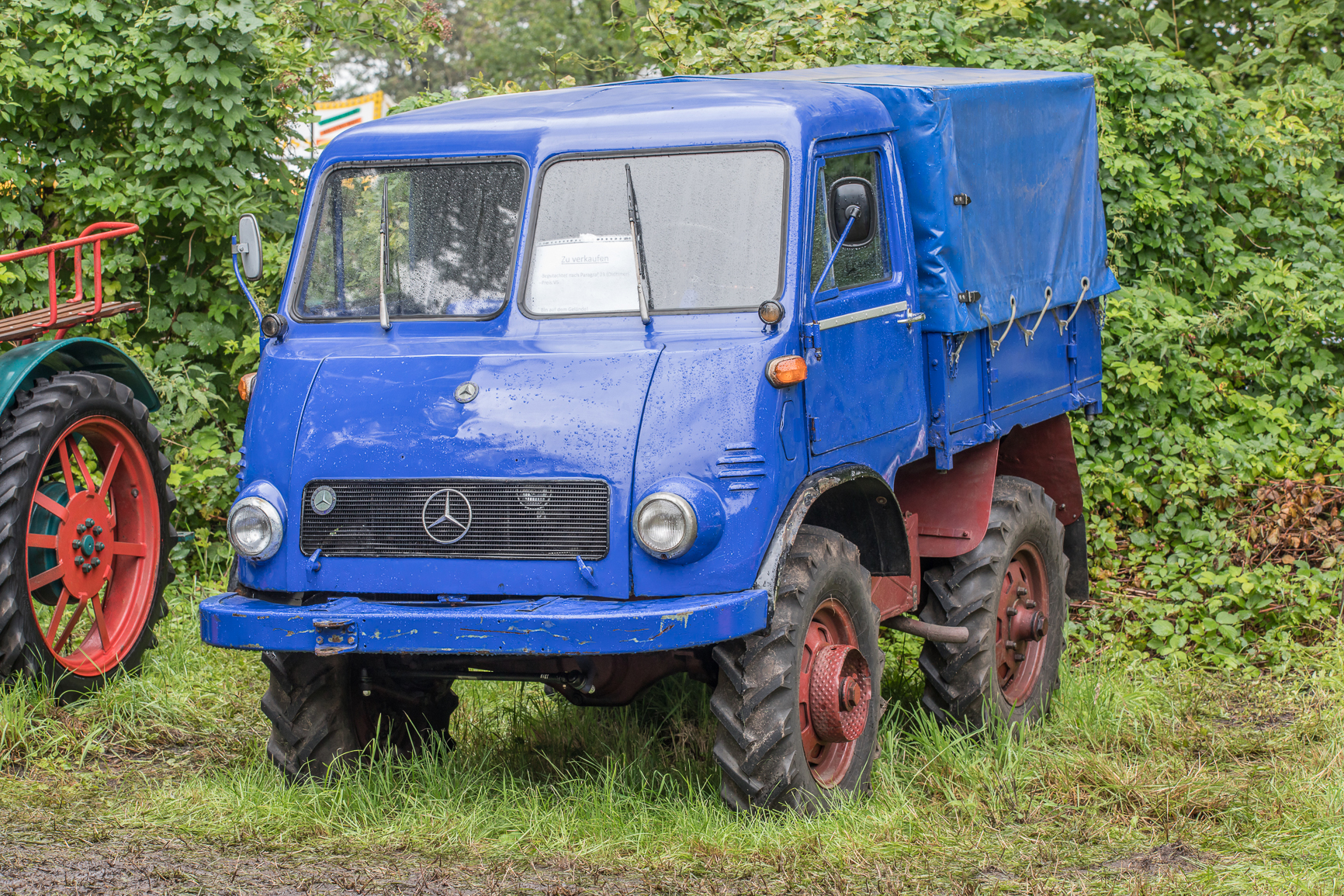
Unimog 411 with Westfalia Type B cab

=== Westfalia cab ===
Like the Unimog 401 and 402 before it, a closed cab was also offered for the Unimog 411, which was manufactured by Westfalia in Wiedenbrück. Daimler-Benz equipped the Unimogs with this cab ex works. When production of the 411 series began in August 1956, the type B cab, which had already been built for the Unimog 401, was modified for the new Unimog 411 chassis and continued to be built almost unchanged on the outside. It has the model 411.520. This cab is nicknamed the frog's eye and was only built 1107 times, the models 411.111 (1720 mm wheelbase) and 411.113 (2120 mm wheelbase) were equipped with it until they were discontinued in October 1961. Westfalia had already produced a new cab for the Unimog 411 in 1957. It has the model 411.521 and is designated as cab type DvF.It was only built for the 411.117 and 411.120 models with 2120 mm wheelbase. DvF stands for Type D, widened cab. As the name suggests, its dimensions were significantly larger than those of the Type B, it has a 30% larger volume and is wider than the Unimog's loading platform. The windshield is undivided and the ergonomics have been significantly improved. The shape follows the truck design of the Mercedes-Benz brand in the 1950s and 1960s with an elliptical radiator grille with headlights framed on the outer edge and lavish chrome trim. Unlike the convertible models, the front bumper is more rounded and more strongly curved at the ends. On request, Daimler-Benz equipped the DvF cab with a heater. A disadvantage of the DvF cab was the high heat load caused by the engine exhaust heat. The reason for this is the engine cover, which protrudes far into the passenger compartment and does not sufficiently insulate the cab from the engine. Production of the Unimog 411 was discontinued in 1974, but Westfalia continued to build the DvF cab until 1978.

In the mid-1960s, Westfalia also tested a GRP hardtop for the convertible versions of the Unimog 411. It offered better protection from the weather and better visibility to the sides than the fabric top. Although brochures were printed and the hardtop was included in the official Unimog catalog, it was hardly ever sold. It is not known how many hardtops were produced.

=== Annual series change ===
==== Prototype 411 ====
1957

The 411 was extensively modified in 1957. The indicators were removed and replaced by conventional car indicators. Other external innovations included the new Mercedes badge on the hood and the modified rear lights. The engine output was increased to 32 hp (23.5 kW) from March and the transmission synchronized could be supplied on request, in July new springs with a wire diameter of 19.5 mm instead of 18 mm were fitted to the rear axles, and from September a reinforced steering system with a three-spoke steering wheel from Fulmina was installed. In the convertible models, the side windows made of Cellon were replaced by polyvinyl chloride windows as early as May 1957 . Mercedes-Benz also introduced the economy model U 25 in May. The new Westfalia type DvF cab was presented at the IAA in September; a trailer brake system was available from October.

1958

From March or April 1958 the Unimog 411 was equipped as standard with a 60-liter fuel tank instead of just 40 liters. Other changes were rather minor, including modifications to the brake system, the installation of a combined pre-glow and start switch, a reinforced power take-off and the installation of hinged windows on the Westfalia cab type DvF.

1959

From January, the synchronized gearbox, which had previously only been offered as an optional extra, became standard equipment. The economy model U 25 was discontinued without replacement in 1959.

1960

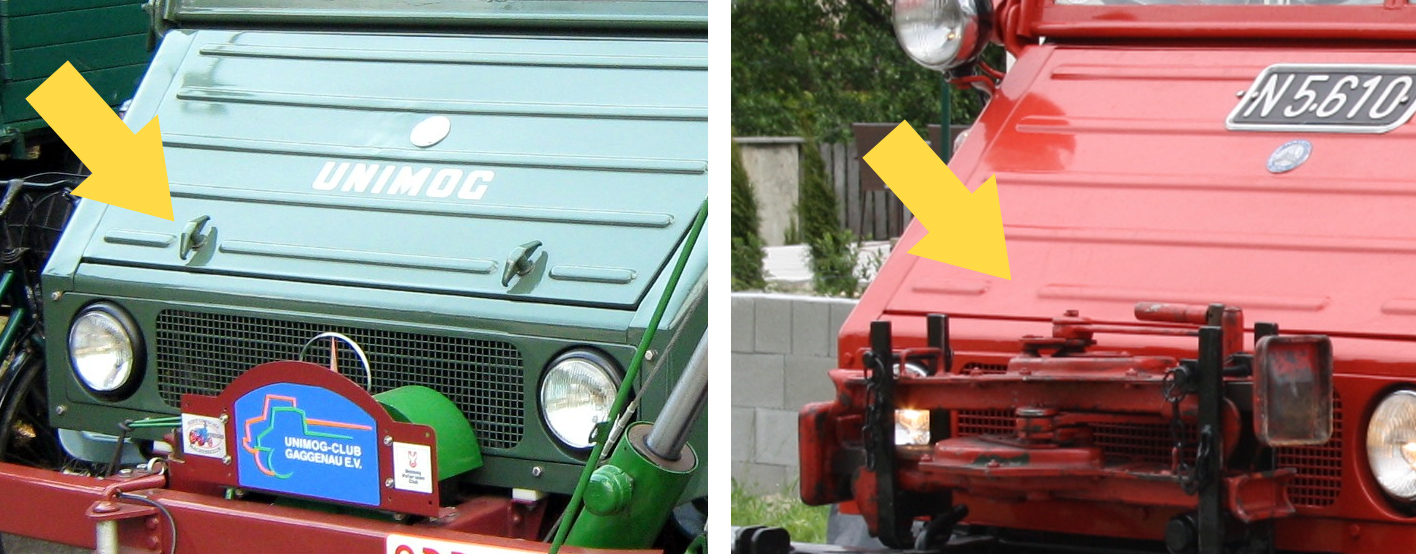
The snap lock is installed on the right, so that external toggles are no longer required.

In January 1960, the chassis numbering system was changed so that the first two digits no longer formed a number from 55 to 95. Instead, the chassis numbers began with "01" from 1960. The hood design was changed. Snap locks were installed, making the outside toggles superfluous. In addition, the mirrors were mounted further down and no longer on the A-pillar. The rear suspension of the cab had already been modified in March 1960 for the introduction of the three-point suspension cab in October 1961.

==== 411a ====
1961

In October 1961, the Unimog 411 underwent a comprehensive model update, which upgraded the series, particularly in technical terms: the original type 411 was replaced by the type 411a. The 411a was launched on October 9, 1961. was produced in series and differs from the original 411 in its ladder frame with higher longitudinal members: 120 mm instead of 100. In addition, a newly introduced hydraulic system with front and rear power lift was offered and the cab was fitted with a three-point suspension, which significantly increased comfort for the occupants. The type 411a can be recognized by the headlights, which are no longer attached to the frame but to the radiator grille, causing them to protrude slightly forwards, as does the front bumper, which is curved at the ends. The flatbed has four instead of three side boards on each side and is 30 mm away from the cab. The production of vehicles with the Westfalia Type B cab was finally discontinued in October 1961.

1962

The indentations on the hood for the toggles, which were no longer required, were removed and all vehicles were fitted with a new blinker system from Bosch. The rear window of the convertible top was enlarged, and the DvF cabs were fitted with two-piece headlight rings.

==== 411b ====
1963–1964

In March, production of the 411a was discontinued due to the new 411b. The most important change to the 411b was the introduction of the axle design of the Unimog 406, which replaced the old axle manufactured by Erhard & Söhne. The windshield was increased from 410 mm to 450 mm, and the convertible models were given a triangular window behind the A-pillar. At the rear, the fenders were completely black. Other technical changes included a modified exhaust system, a hydraulic power steering system offered as an optional extra and a new, now two-stage master brake cylinder.

==== 411c ====
1965

The 411b was built until February 1965, from February 1965 the type 411c was produced in series, the main difference to the 411b being the 2 hp (1471 W) increase in engine output. Daimler-Benz continued to install the OM 636.914 engine; however, the rated speed was increased from 2550 rpm to 2750 rpm. In addition, the cylinder head, injection pump and throttle body were modified. This resulted in an improvement in performance to 34 hp (25 kW). In order to maintain the same driving speeds at rated engine speed, the transmission ratio of the axles was changed from 25:7 to 35:9. The rear hood mount, the speedometer in the cab, the V-belt pulley for the compressor and the rear lights were also modified. With the introduction of the type 411c in 1965, there were three models - 411.118, 411.119 and 411.120 - and nine models.

1966

From April 1966, the standard color of the Unimog was changed from Unimog green (DB 6286) to truck green (DB 6277). The dropside hinges of the Unimog 421 were installed and the rear spring brackets were cast. The models with the Westfalia DvF cab were given a handle on the A-pillar to make it easier to get in.

Truck green (DB 6277)	Unimog green (DB 6286)

1967

The most important change from 1967 was the introduction of the Unimog 421 bumper, which can be recognized by the longitudinal beading. Furthermore, swivel bearings on the front axle and a door handle guard were installed on the convertible models.

1968

The frame received a new mounting plate bracket and welded front and rear beams. The thermostat was modified and the DvF cabs were fitted with new exterior mirrors.

1969

The last major innovation came in 1969, when the extra-long wheelbase of 2570 mm was introduced for export with the 411.114 model. The model 411.114 was primarily supplied to the Portuguese military, which used the vehicle in the civil war in Angola. Dhe fulminal steering was replaced by a ZF Gemmer steering of type 7340. In addition, the fuel lines were made of plastic.

1970

In 1970, the hole arrangement in the dashboard was changed to accommodate a fuel gauge and a glow monitor as standard.

1971–1974

In 1971, the round indicators were replaced by square indicators, a windshield washer system was introduced and the windshield frame was painted black. All vehicles received a new two-spoke steering wheel in 1972 and the convertible models were fitted with more modern exterior mirrors. Nothing more was changed in 1973 and 1974.

== Models ==
The Unimog 411 was offered in many model variants. The model designations represent the vehicle type and equipment features of the Unimog, but only provide a limited indication of the model type. In the Unimog 411, the model designation is made up of one, two or three suffixes that determine the vehicle type, the engine power in DIN hp and any prefixes that indicate equipment features. A U 34 L designates a standard-equipped Unimog with 34 hp (25 kW) engine power and a long wheelbase. The following Suf and prefixes existed; if they were not used over the entire production period, it is indicated:

- U: Unimog in basic version
- A: Without trailer brake system
- B: With trailer brake system (up to approx. 1961)
- C: With pneumatic power lift (up to approx. 1961)
- D: With trailer brake system (from approx. 1961)
- F: Westfalia cab type DvF
- H: With hydraulic power lift (from approx. 1961)
- L: Long wheelbase of 2120 mm
- S: Tractor unit

The following engine outputs were offered:

- 25 PS (18,5 kW)
- 30 PS (22 kW)
- 32 PS (23,5 kW)
- 34 PS (25 kW)
- 36 PS (26,5 kW)

== Prototype ==
=== Type overview ===
A total of 39,581 Unimog 411s and 350 subsets in twelve different models were built. 11,604 units had the type DvF cab, 1107 had the type B cab and 26,870 Unimog 411s were convertibles. Around 57.2 % of all Unimog 411s built had the long wheelbase of 2120 mm and 2.9 % had the extra-long wheelbase of 2570 mm. The following models of the Unimog 411 were built:

Model of the Unimog 411
Prototype	411 type	Production period	Driver's cab	Wheelbase	Motor power (kW)	Quantities	Notes
411.110	411	1956/08 to 1957/09	Convertible	1720 mm	22	8977	
411.110	411	1957/09 to 1961/10	Convertible	1720 mm	23,5	8977	
411.110	411a	1961/10 to 1963/01	Convertible	1720 mm	23,5	8977	
411.111	411	1956/09 to 1961/10	Westfalia Type B	1720 mm	22	819	
411.112	411	1956/09 to 1961/10	Convertible	2120 mm	23,5	6155	
411.112	411a	1961/10 to 1963/01	Convertible	2120 mm	23,5	6155	
411.113	411	1956/09 to 1961/10	Westfalia Type B	2120 mm	22	288	
411.114	411c	1969/10 to 1973	Convertible	2570 mm	26,5	1091	In 1957, a prototype was built with the type 411.114, which had a 48 kW petrol engine and a wheelbase of 2120 mm. Type 411.114 was reissued in 1969.
411.115	411c	1968/10 until 1973	Convertible	2570 mm	26,5	54	
411.116	411	1957/05 to 1959	Convertible	1720 mm	18,5	54	
411.117	411	1957/09 to 1961/10	Westfalia type DvF	2120 mm	23,5	6906	
411.117	411a	1961/10 to 1963/03	Westfalia type DvF	2120 mm	23,5	6906	
411.118	411b	1963/01 to 1965/02	Convertible	1720 mm	23,5	2072	
411.118	411c	1965/02 to 1974/10	Convertible	1720 mm	25	2072	
411.119	411b	1963/01 to 1965/02	Convertible	2120 mm	23,5	8467	
411.119	411c	1965/02 to 1974/10	Convertible	2120 mm	25	8467	
411.120	411b	1963/03 to 1965/02	Westfalia type DvF	2120 mm	23,5	4698	
411.120	411c	1965/02 to 1974/10	Westfalia type DvF	2120 mm	25	4698	
411.160	411c	1968/05 to 1969	Open control station	–	26,5	350	Parts manufactured for Gafner, which served as the basis for the Gafner MB 411 skidder

Year	Production figures
1956	665
1957	3603
1958	2735
1959	3117
1960	3924
1961	4840
1962	3921
1963	3747
1964	2842
1965	2119
1966	1190
1967	1575
1968	1382
1969	1216
1970	1156
1971	509
1972	485
1973	397
1974	158
Sum	39581

== Base prices ==
The 411 series was built in various versions. The following table shows the basic prices (list prices) for the West German market:

Modell	Year	Standard equipment	Wheelbase	Price
U 30	1956	Open cab	1720 mm	12.500 DM
D 32	as of October 12, 1961	open cab, trailer brake system, compressor, double pressure gauge, tire inflation hose	1720 mm	14.350 DM
DL 32	as of October 12, 1961	open cab, trailer brake system, compressor, double pressure gauge, tire inflation hose	2120 mm	14.720 DM
DFL 32	as of October 12, 1961	Enclosed cab, trailer brake system, compressor, dual pressure gauge, tire inflation hose, heating, ventilation, without tractor rail	2120 mm	16.575 DM
H 32	as of October 12, 1961	open cab, hydraulic system, three-point rear linkage	1720 mm	15.100 DM
HL 32	as of October 12, 1961	open cab, hydraulic system, three-point rear linkage	2120 mm	15.470 DM
HFL 32	as of October 12, 1961	closed cab, heating, ventilation, hydraulic system, three-point rear linkage	2120 mm	17.475 DM
D 34	ab 1. März 1965	open cab, trailer brake system	1720 mm	15.300 DM

== Technical description ==
=== Driver's cab ===
The Unimog 411 was available with a fabric top ("convertible") and a closed cab; the closed cabs were supplied by Westfalia. All cabs, including the convertible version, had a rigid four-point suspension in the original 411 model, and a three-point suspension from the 411a model onwards (October 1961). Both the convertible and the closed cab have two seats. In the original type, the driver's cab and flatbed form a single structural unit; from 411a onwards, the two parts are separate.

=== Motor ===
The Unimog 411 is powered by an OM 636.914 inline four-cylinder pre-chamber naturally aspirated diesel engine. This engine has a displacement of 1767 cm³, a side camshaft and overhead valves. The water-cooled engine is installed centrally at the front and tilted slightly to the rear. It is started with an electric starter. The power output was initially 30 hp (22 kW) at 2550 rpm, but was gradually increased over the production period to 32 hp (23.5 kW) and ultimately 34 hp (25 kW); The economy model U 25 received the engine with 25 hp (18.5 kW) at 2350 rpm; however, it was only sold in small numbers.The engine was also offered with 36 hp (26.5 kW) for some export models.

=== Frame ===
The ladder frame of the Unimog 411 is a flat frame made of folded (later rolled) U-profiles with a web height of 100 mm (original type 411) or 120 mm (411a,b,c). The U-profiles are connected with five riveted cross beams. Two cross members are positioned close together at the front and rear, one cross member is directly behind the cab. The rear cross member is additionally connected to the U-profiles with two cross members, which are attached in the middle and run diagonally to the next cross member, thus forming triangles. The fact that the cab and platform body are connected to the frame at four points on the original model means that the parts cannot twist against each other, which encourages fractures, cracks and permanent deformations. From the 411a onwards, the frames could twist better, as the cab now had two points for the suspension at the rear, but only one at the front. Various accessories such as mounting brackets, additional crossbars and plates were offered for the frame to enable additional equipment to be attached to the frame.

=== Chassis and drivetrain ===
Thanks to the portal axles with wheel reduction gearing, the Unimog has a relatively high ground clearance despite its small wheels. The axles are guided on pushrods and Panhard rods. The thrust tubes are mounted on the transmission in ball joints and are rigidly connected to the differential gears of the axles. The drive shafts, which transmit the torque from the transmission to the axles, run in the thrust tubes. The axles of the Unimog are suspended with two coil springs each (front 17 mm or 18 mm, rear initially 18 mm, then 19.5 mm).) with additional internal springs and hydraulic telescopic shock absorbers. The wheel suspension allows particularly long suspension travel and therefore a large axle articulation, making the Unimog very off-road capable. The U 411 was supplied with 7.5-18″ tires as standard. Tires with dimensions of 10-18″, later 10.5-18″ were available as special equipment.

The original type and the 411a have the portal axle called the sheet metal axle, which was manufactured by Erhard & Söhne. The sheet metal axle consists of two U-shaped sheet metal shells, each approx. 1.2 m long, with an offset for the differential in the middle; the two sheet metal shells were welded together on top of each other to form a banjo axle. The differential gear and the drive shafts are located inside. On the outside, a separate housing for the wheel reduction gears is bolted to each side of the sheet metal axles. A central fastening screw is fitted in the wheel hub, which is clearly visible from the outside. From 1963, with the type 411b, Daimler-Benz also installed the axle of the Unimog 406 in a modified form in the 411. The new axles are constructed from a differential housing and two cast axle halves approx. 0.6 m long, with a half differential bell formed at the inner ends. The two axle halves are connected vertically to the differential housing with internal hexagon bolts (funnel axle). The wheel reduction gears are bolted to the outer ends. The external distinguishing feature of the new axle is the hub, from which the wheel lock screw no longer protrudes (see picture on the right). This new axle was cheaper to manufacture, easier to maintain and more resilient than the sheet metal axle. The axle ratio of the Unimog axles is 25 : 7 (Ur-411, 411a, 411b) or 35 : 9 (411c).

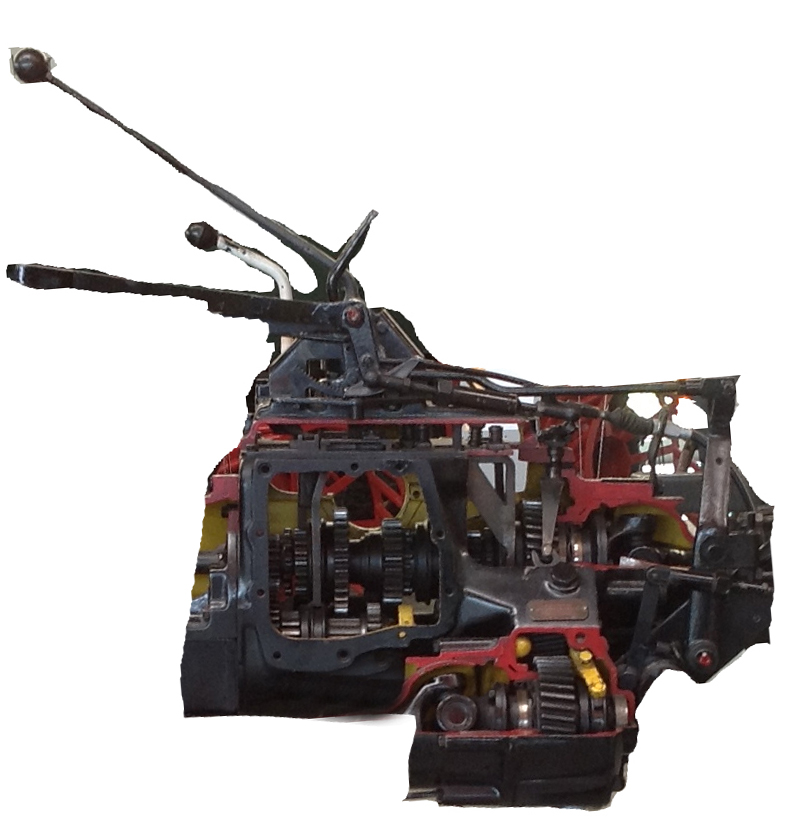
Synchronized gearbox UG 1/11

=== Gearbox ===
Daimler-Benz installed the UG1/11 gearbox in the Unimog 411, also known as the F gearbox, which is designed for an input torque of 107.9 N-m (11 kp-m). It has claw gears, ball-bearing shafts, six forward and two reverse gears. An additional creeper gearbox with two gears was available on request. The forward gears are engaged with the large upper lever, the reverse gears with the small lever in the middle and the creeper gears with the larger lower lever (see picture on the right). From March 1957, the gearbox could be customized by installing balls, stones, leaf springs and synchronizer rings. synchronized; from 1959 it was synchronized as standard and equipped with plain bearings. The same transmission was already installed in the synchronized version in the Unimog 404 from 1955. A transfer case is directly flange-mounted to drive the front axle. The speed range extends from 1-55 km/h.

=== Pneumatics ===
The pneumatic system is the heart of the power lift system on the original 411, as the front and rear power lifts are moved pneumatically, as on the Unimog 401. The pneumatic system essentially consists of six main components: A compressor driven by the engine, a control valve, a compressed air tank installed diagonally across the top in front of the rear axle, the control unit in the cab, the rear power lift system with two pneumatic cylinders and the front power lift system with one pneumatic cylinder. The pneumatic system was essentially taken over from the Unimog 401, but reinforced for greater lifting power. The large compressed air tank in particular required a lot of space. On request, a pneumatic lifting cylinder was also available for tipping the platform, which was operated at a pressure of approx. 8 bar.

=== Hydraulic system ===
A hydraulic system was offered from type 411a onwards, but was not fitted as standard. It consists of six main components: a gear oil pump, an oil tank, two hydraulic cylinders and two control units with operating levers. The hydraulic pump has a maximum working pressure of 150 bar. The oil tank at the front of the Unimog has a capacity of 8.5 liters. The control units are located behind the engine; they each have a control lever. The control levers are mounted on a bar under the steering wheel. The driver can operate the hydraulic cylinder of the rear linkage with the first lever. The second lever is used to control the attachments.

== Paintwork ==
Most of the vehicles are adapted to the taste of the 1950s and, like their predecessors, are painted in Unimog green. Unimog green was the standard color from the start of production until 1966, with around 54% of all vehicles having this color. Truck grey was also available ex works, the only color that was retained throughout the entire production period. However, only around 3% of all Unimog 411s ever built were painted in this color. From 1966 onwards, truck green was used as the standard color; this color had already been available for the Unimog 406 since 1963. Only 20% of all vehicles ever built had this color; 23% were painted in special colors, which were offered over the entire production period. Due to the large number of special colors, they are not listed separately here. The most important customers who ordered a special color were the Deutsche Bundesbahn and the Deutsche Bundespost in addition to the military.

Standard colors

Truck green (DB 6277)	Truck gray (DB 7187)	Unimog green (DB 6286)

The frame, tank, axles and springs were not painted in the color of the car, but in deep black (RAL 9005), the wheels in carmine red (RAL 3002). From 1958 to 1960, Daimler-Benz used chassis red (DB 3575) for these parts (with the exception of the wheels) instead. In the 1970s, Mercedes-Benz also changed the color of the wheels to jet black.

Deep black (RAL 9005)	Carmine red (RAL 3002)	Chassis red (DB 3575)

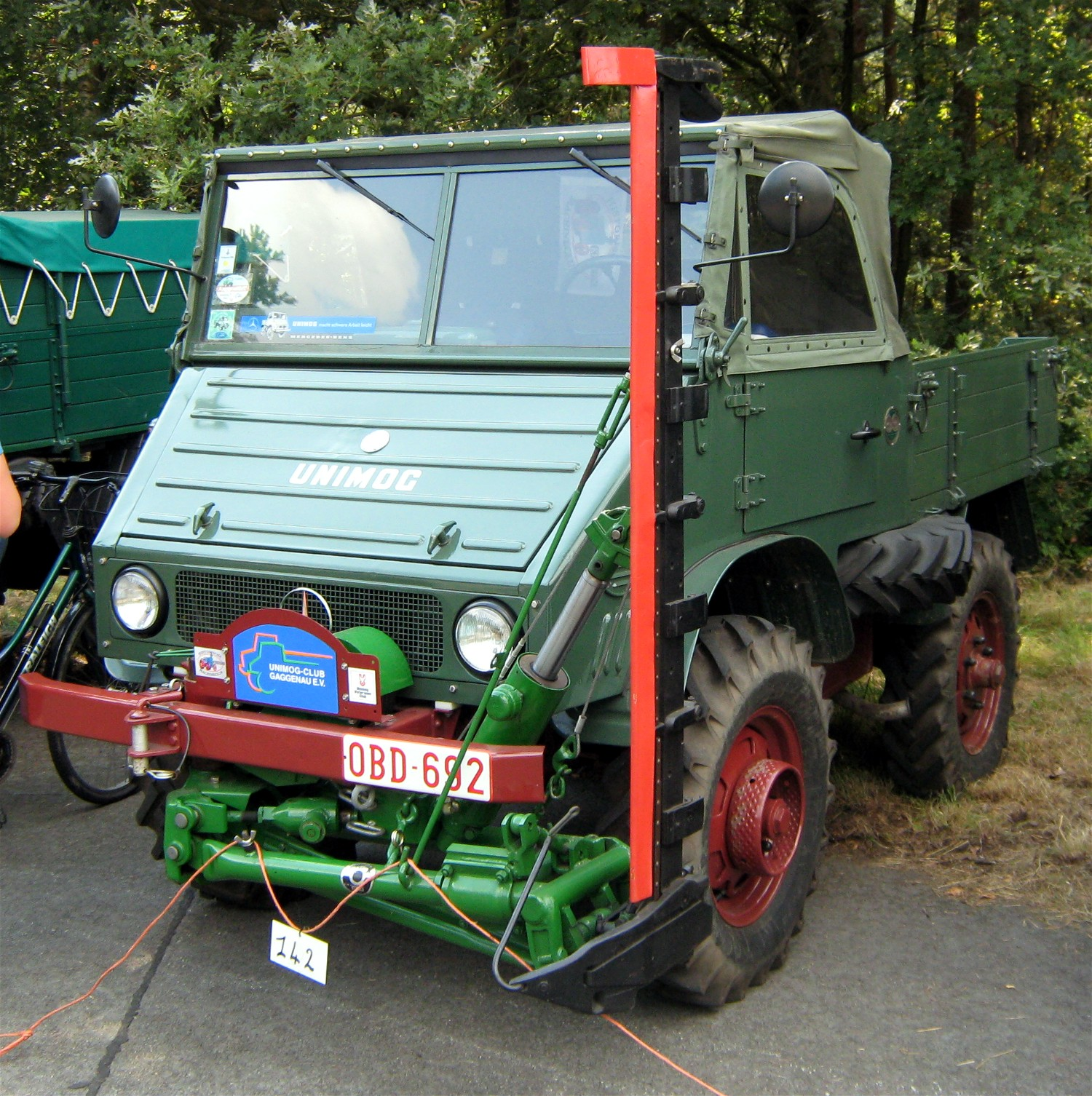
Mower BM 62 KW on Unimog 411

== Accessories ==
Accessories were available separately at extra cost. Busatis developed the BM 62 KW mower specially for the Unimog 411 in collaboration with Daimler-Benz. As with other Unimog models, there was a front cable winch that was driven via the PTO shaft. Two different types of cable winch, type A and type C, were available, each with a pulling force of approx. 30 kN. (Note: Vogler does not state force in the source in a unit of force such as kilonewtons (kN), but incorrectly in newton metres (Nm), a unit of measurement for torque.) Since the winch itself has a pulling force of 3000 kp or 3500 kp, depending on the model, I strongly assume that Vogler means 30 kN here, since 3500 kp corresponds to about 34 kN. > While the type A is the "simple" version, the type C has an additional reduction gear and a band brake, so that the type C cable winch is also suitable for lowering loads. Both cable winches have a cable length of 50 m and a cable diameter of 11 mm or 12 mm. The rope speed is infinitely variable between 48 and 60 m/min. Electron built a compressed air generator for the Unimog 411, which can be used to drive external compressed air devices such as pneumatic hammers or drills. The compressed air generator is driven by the front PTO shaft and delivers air at up to 2200 dm³/min, the operating pressure is 6 bar. In cooperation with Daimler-Benz, Donges Stahlbau developed the Unikran type SU, a crane trailer for the Unimog 411, between 1955 and 1957. The Unikran type SU has a lifting capacity of 2942 daN (3 Mp) and a hook height of approx. 7 m to 8 m. It can also be operated without a Unimog. The Swiss manufacturer Haller produced an engine dust brake for the Unimog 411, which was retrofitted to a significant number of vehicles.

== Technical data 1957 ==
Modell	U 30
Prototype	411.110
Motor	OM 636
Design	Water-cooled in-line four-cylinder pre-chamber diesel engine
Displacement	1767 cm³
Rated power	DIN 70020: 30 PS (22 kW); SAE: 35 hp (26 kW) bei 2550 min^{−1}
Clutch	Single-disc dry clutch Fichtel & Sachs K 16 Z
Gearbox	Daimler-Benz UG 1 6 forward gears, 2 reverse gears, not synchronized
Steering	Fulmina Typ 25
Brake system	Hydraulic drum brakes on all four wheels
Tires	7,5–18″ AS
Platform area	2,2 m²
Fuel tank volume	40 l
Fuel consumption	ca. 10 l/100 km 2–6 l h
Mass	DIN 70020: 1795 kg
Payload	1000 kg
Permissible total mass	3200 kg
Permissible axle load (v/h)	1475 kg 2000 kg
Track gauge	1290 mm
Wheelbase	1720 mm
Ground clearance	380 mm
Length	3520 mm
Width	1630 mm
Height (above windshield)	2065 mm
Tracking circle diameter	DIN 70020: 7600 mm
Source	

== Subsequent valuation ==
With the Unimog 411a, Daimler-Benz successfully completed the expansion of the Unimog concept from tractor to system tractor for the first time. While the original Unimog was designed purely as an agricultural vehicle, it was recognized that the Unimog 411 was also in demand in other areas. In 1975, Gerold Lingnau wrote in a special edition of the Frankfurter Allgemeine Zeitung: "Admittedly, hardly 175,000 Unimogs would have been built to date if it had only remained an agricultural vehicle. Its career in other areas began early on. [...] The fact that the Unimog is so versatile is due not least to an enterprising equipment industry. It recognized its opportunity early on and - in close cooperation with Daimler-Benz - developed hundreds of attachments for this first 'implement carrier' in vehicle history." Carl-Heinz Vogler attributes the Unimog's development into a popular vehicle with local authorities, the construction industry and the transport sector to continuous further developments such as the reinforced frame of the 411a and the larger all-steel cab of the DvF model.

The flat ladder frame construction of the Unimog 411 is extremely robust, and its torsional and bending rigidity were unrivaled at the time, which made the Unimog 411 a particularly reliable vehicle. However, the U-411 frame could no longer keep up with the offset frame of the Unimog 404 and 406, which offered better torsional properties.

== Literature ==
- Carl-Heinz Vogler: Unimog 411: Typengeschichte und Technik. GeraMond-Verlag, München 2014, ISBN 978-3-86245-605-5.
- Gerold Lingnau: Unimog. Des Menschen bester Freund. Die dreißig Jahre alte Idee vom „Universal-Motor-Gerät“ ist heute noch taufrisch / Bisher 175 000 Einheiten gebaut. In: Frankfurter Allgemeine Zeitung, 5 March 1975, p. 29.
