= Unimog 404 =

German truck by Mercedes-Benz (1955–1980)

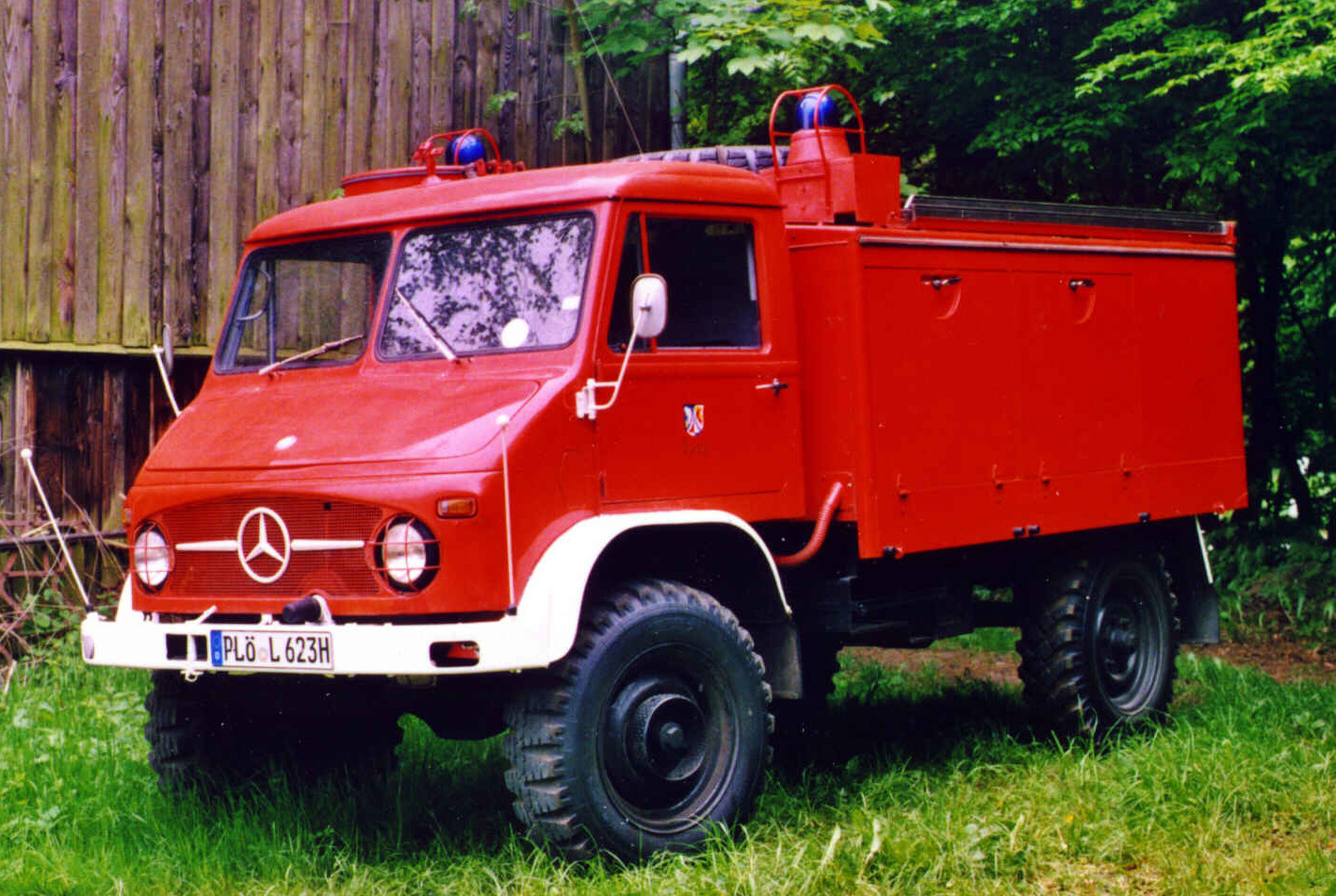
- Unimog 404.1 based German fire engine TLF 8/8

Overview
- Type: Truck
- Manufacturer: Daimler-Benz AG
- Also called: 404.1: Unimog U82; 404.0: Unimog U110
- Production: 1955–1980
- Assembly: Germany: Gaggenau (Mercedes-Benz Gaggenau plant)

Powertrain
- Engine: 2.2 L M180 I6 (petrol); 2.8 L M130 I6 (petrol); 2.2 L OM615 I4 (diesel)
- Transmission: 6-speed manual with 2 additional reverse gears

Chronology
- Predecessor: none
- Successor: Unimog 435

The Unimog 404, also called the Unimog S and Unimog 404 S, is a vehicle of the Unimog-series by Mercedes-Benz, produced in the Unimog plant in Gaggenau from 1955 to 1980. Marketed as Unimog U82, and later Unimog U110, a total 64,242 units of the two Unimog 404 types 404.0 and 404.1 were built, which makes the 404 the Unimog model with the highest production figure of all Unimogs. Unlike the Unimog 401, the 404 is rather a small 1.5-tonne-offroad-truck than an agricultural vehicle. In Germany, it was a common military vehicle and fire engine, 36,000 Unimog 404 were made for the Bundeswehr.

The first Unimog 404 concept-vehicle was made in 1953 and was slightly smaller than the series production model, it had a track width of 1,600 mm (63 in) and a wheelbase of 2,670 mm (105 in). Two prototypes for the French army followed in 1954, the first 1,100 series production models were also purchased by the French army. Since the French army did not want the spare wheel to occupy space for soldiers on the bed, the Daimler-Benz engineers decided to build the Unimog 404 with a downswept frame so the spare wheel could be mounted underneath the bed. This constructional feature also allowed more torsional flexing and, therefore, improved the offroad capabilities of the Unimog. Later, the downswept frame became a key constructional feature for the following Unimog types.

At its introduction in 1955, the Unimog 404.1 was available as the 2,700 mm (106 in) wheelbase model with the Otto engine M 180 producing 60 kW (80 hp; 82 PS). In 1956, the 2,900 mm (114 in) wheelbase model of the 404.1 followed, available with the same engine. Both were sold as Unimog U82. The production of the U82 with the short wheelbase was stopped in 1971, while the long wheelbase model was built until 1980. Starting from 1971, the Unimog 404.0, sold as Unimog U110, was offered. It was fitted with the cab of the Unimog 406 and soon afterwards, with the model 404.012, it received the M 130 engine. However, only 1,791 404.0 were made. Also, 81 Unimog 404 were made with the diesel engine OM 615 (44 kW (59 hp; 60 PS)) for the Portuguese market.

== Technical description ==
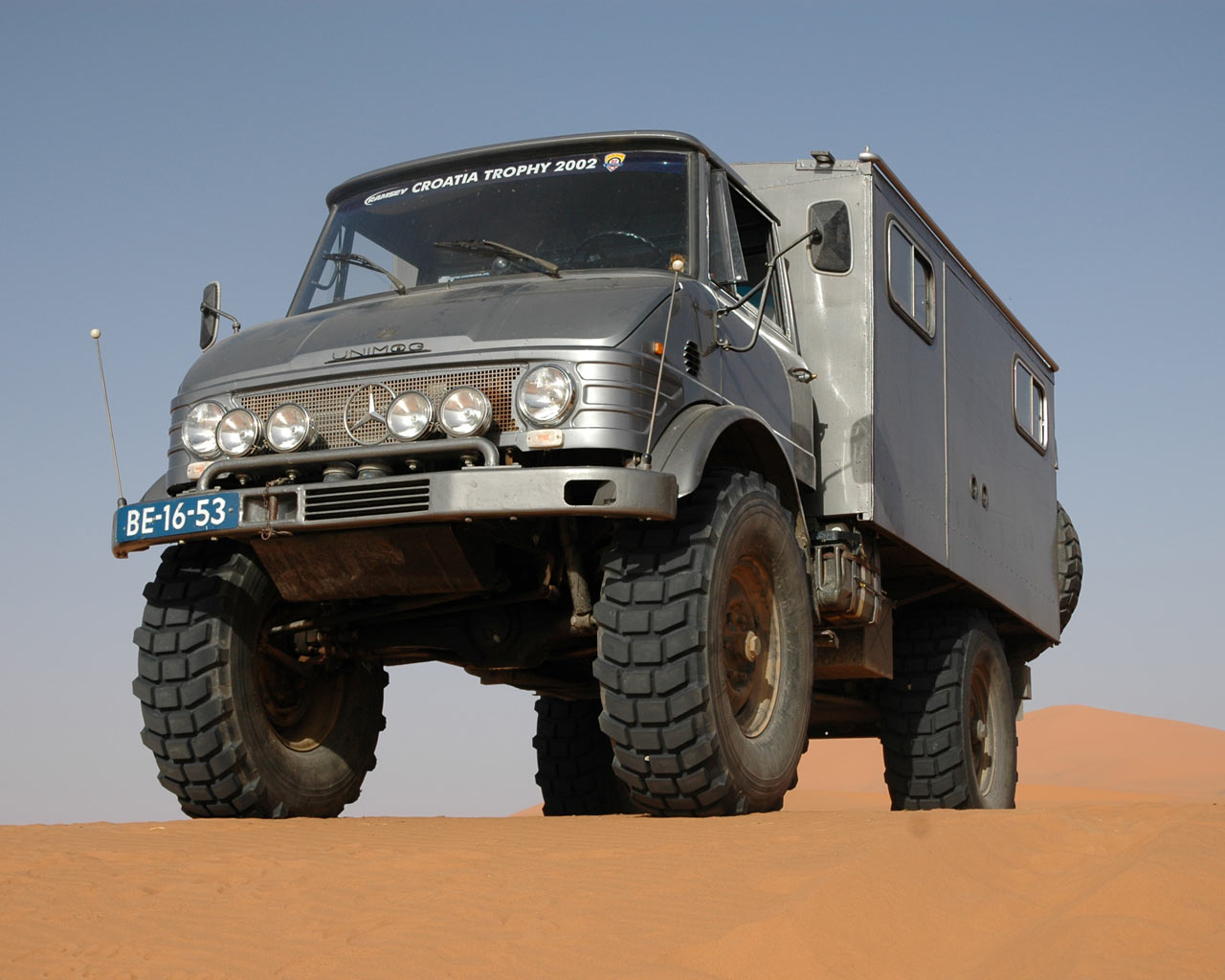
The Unimog 404.0 has the cab of the Unimog 406. Note the large ground clearance due to the portal axles

The Unimog 404 is a small four-wheel offroad capable truck designed for a payload of 1,500 kg (3,307 lb). Like other Unimogs, it has a ladder frame, two portal axles with reduction gears and coil springs with hydraulic shock absorbers for the rear and front axle. All four wheels and tyres have the same size and are fitted with hydraulic ATE drum brakes. The 404 is a rear-wheel-drive vehicle with switchable all-wheel-drive and additional differential locks.

A water-cooled straight-six Otto engine, type M 180 II-U, displacing 2,195 cc (134 cu in) powers the 404.1. It is fitted with a Zenith 32 NDIX offroad-carburettor and transmits the torque to a fully synchronised manual Daimler-Benz-six-speed-gearbox with two additional reverse gears. As clutch, the Fichtel & Sachs K 16 Z single-disc-dry-clutch is used.

The 404 was available both with a standard closed two-door-cab and as a two-door-cabriolet with a convertible top. The 404.1 has a divided windscreen, while the 404.0 with the cab of the Unimog model 406 has a single windscreen. Only the standard cab models have side windows in the doors. Special purpose vehicles, such as fire engines, were also made with an extended four-door-cab.

== Overview of the 404-series ==
Types of the Unimog 404
| Type number | 404-type | Production period | Cab | Wheelbase (mm) | Engine power (kW) | Engine type | Number manufactured | Notes |
|---|---|---|---|---|---|---|---|---|
| 404.010 | 404.0 | | Cabrio | 2900 | 81 | M 130 | 113 | Cab of the Unimog 416, some units with M 180, 60 kW |
| 404.011 | 404.0 | | Closed cab | 2900 | 81 | M 130 | 1151 | Cab of the Unimog 406 |
| 404.012 | 404.0 | | Cabrio | 2900 | 81 | M 130 | 7 | Cab of the 416 |
| 404.013 | 404.0 | | Closed cab | 2900 | 81 | M 130 | 520 | Cab of the 406 |
| 404.111 | 404.1 | 1955–1956 | Cabrio | 2670 | 63 | M 180 | 1210 | Including 578 pre-series models, some units with 59 or 60 kW. |
| 404.112 | 404.1 | | Cabrio and closed cab | 2900 | 60 | M 180 | 185 | |
| 404.113 | 404.1 | | Cabrio and closed cab | 2900 | 60 | M 180 | 8106 | Some vehicles with 68 or 81 kW |
| 404.114 | 404.1 | 1956–1980 | Cabrio, chassis only and double cab | 2900 | 60 | M 180 | 50321 | Some vehicles also with 68 kW |
| 404.115 | 404.1 | | Closed cab | 2900 | 60 | M 180 | 2548 | Some vehicles also with 68 kW |
| 404.117 | 404.1 | 1969–1970 | Cabrio | 2900 | 44 | OM 615 | 81 | Model for the Portuguese market |

== Technical data ==
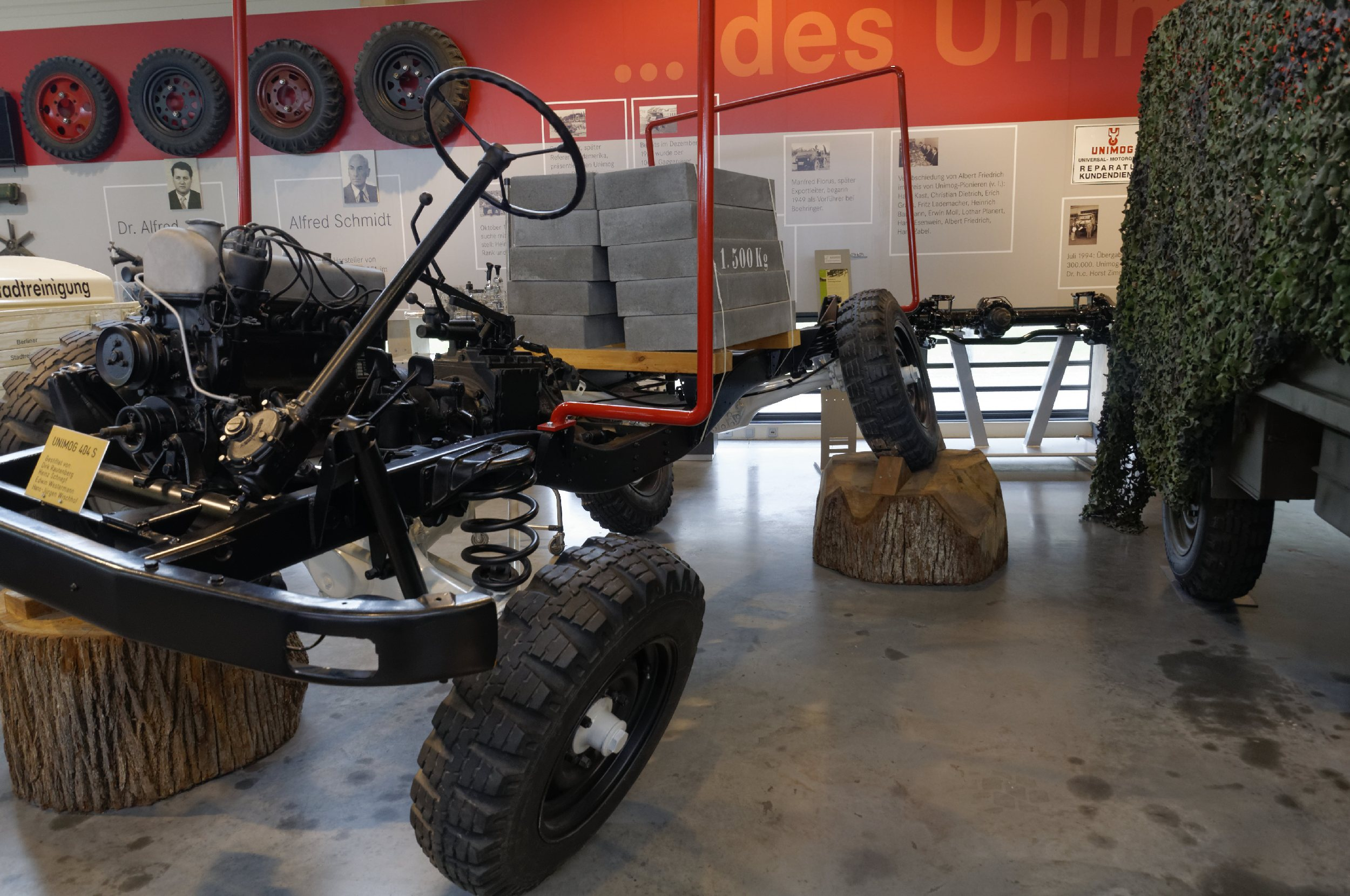
Unimog 404 chassis.

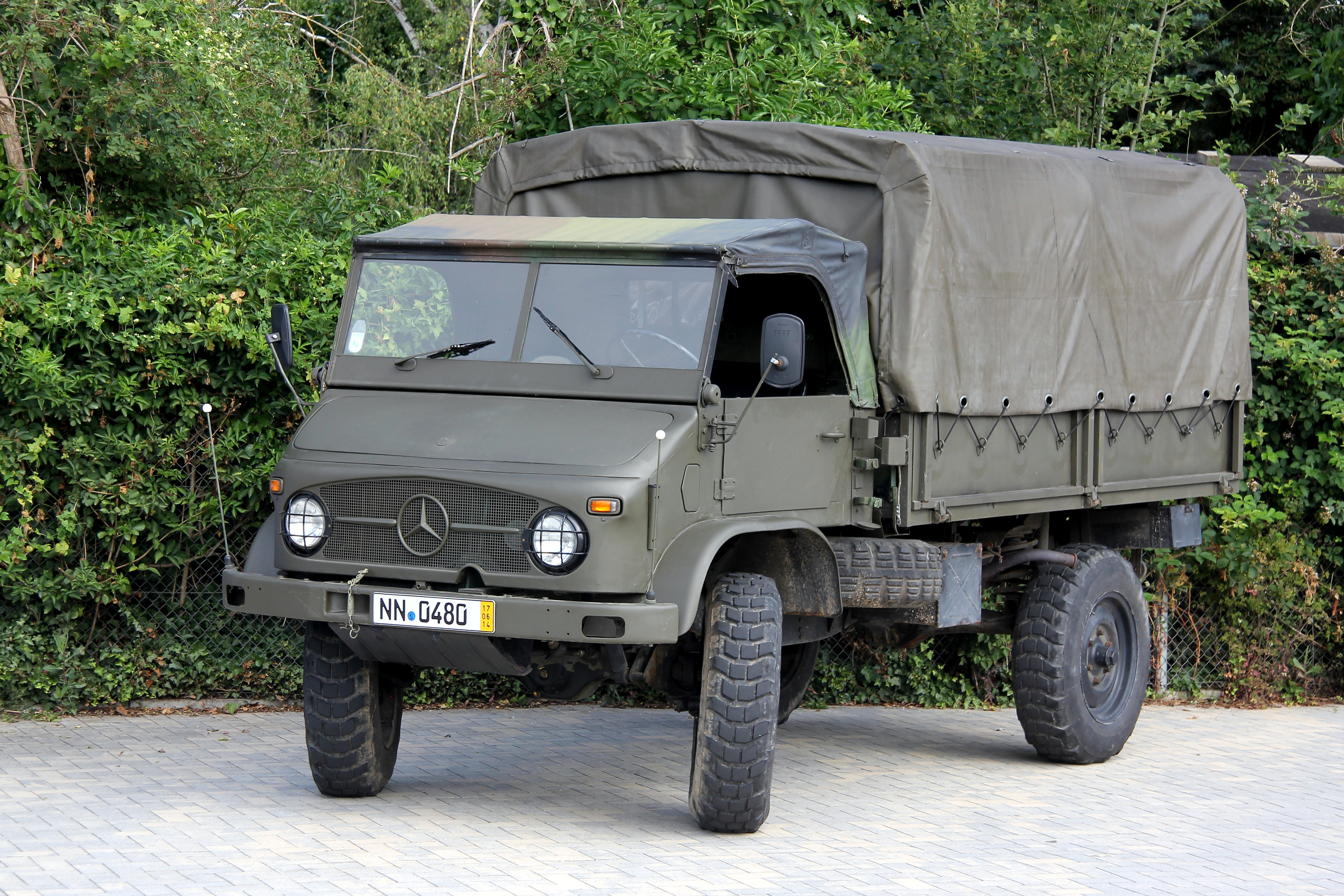
Unimog 404.1 Cabrio. It lacks side windows.

Unimog 404.1 with an extended four-door-cab.

| Type | 404.1 | | 404.0 |
| Sold as | U82 (short) | U82 (long) | U110 |
| Years | 1955–1971 | 1956–1980 | 1971–1980 |
| Mass (approx.) | 2900 kg | 2970 kg | 2970 kg |
| Length | 4600 mm | 4925 mm | 5025 mm |
| Width | 2130 mm | 2140 mm | 2130 mm |
| Height | 2190 mm | 2190 mm | 2250 mm |
| Wheelbase | 2700 mm | 2900 mm | |
| Track width | 1630 mm | | |
| Ground clearance | | 400 mm | |
| Bed length | 2700 mm | 3000 mm | |
| Bed width | 2000 mm | | |
| Bed height | 500 mm | | |
| Fuel tank capacity | 2 × 60 l | | |
| Tyres | 10–20 | | 10.5–20 |
| Engine model | M 180/II U | | M 130 |
| Engine type | Straight-six Otto, water-cooled | | |
| Fuel system | Carburettor type Zenith 32 NDIX | | |
| Displacement | 2195 cc | | 2778 cc |
| Bore × stroke | 80 mm × 72.8 mm | | 86.5 mm × 78.8 mm |
| Compression ratio | 7:1 | | |
| Rated power (DIN 70020) | 80–82 PS (59–60 kW) at 4850 rpm | | 110 PS (81 kW) at 4800 rpm |
| Max. torque (DIN 70020) | 16.1 kp⋅m (157.9 N⋅m) at 3200 rpm | | |
| Top speed | 6th gear: 95 km/h | 1st gear: 7 km/h 2nd gear: 13 km/h 3rd gear: 24 km/h 4th gear: 44 km/h 5th gear: 72 km/h 6th gear: 95 km/h 1st reverse gear: 6 km/h 2nd reverse gear: 10 km/h | 6th gear: 100 km/h |
| Climbing capability | | 1st gear: 70% 2nd gear: 45% 3rd gear: 23% 4th gear: 11.5% 5th gear: 6.5% 6th gear: 3.5% | |
| Source | | | |

=== Production figures ===
| Year | Production figures |
|---|---|
| 1955 | 578 |
| 1956 | 1334 |
| 1957 | 2337 |
| 1958 | 2651 |
| 1959 | 3649 |
| 1960 | 5516 |
| 1961 | 4986 |
| 1962 | 6593 |
| 1963 | 5810 |
| 1964 | 4710 |
| 1965 | 4765 |
| 1966 | 4479 |
| 1967 | 2438 |
| 1968 | 3261 |
| 1969 | 3337 |
| 1970 | 2645 |
| 1971 | 802 |
| 1972 | 684 |
| 1973 | 1090 |
| 1974 | 932 |
| 1975 | 347 |
| 1976 | 334 |
| 1977 | 142 |
| 1978 | 53 |
| 1979 | 758 |
| 1980 | 11 |
| Sum | 64242 |

== Bibliography ==
- Carl-Heinz Vogler: Typenatlas Unimog. Alle Unimog-Klassiker seit 1946 bis 1993. GeraMond, München 2015, ISBN 978-3-86245-026-8, S. 41 ff.
