= Unimog 421 =

German truck

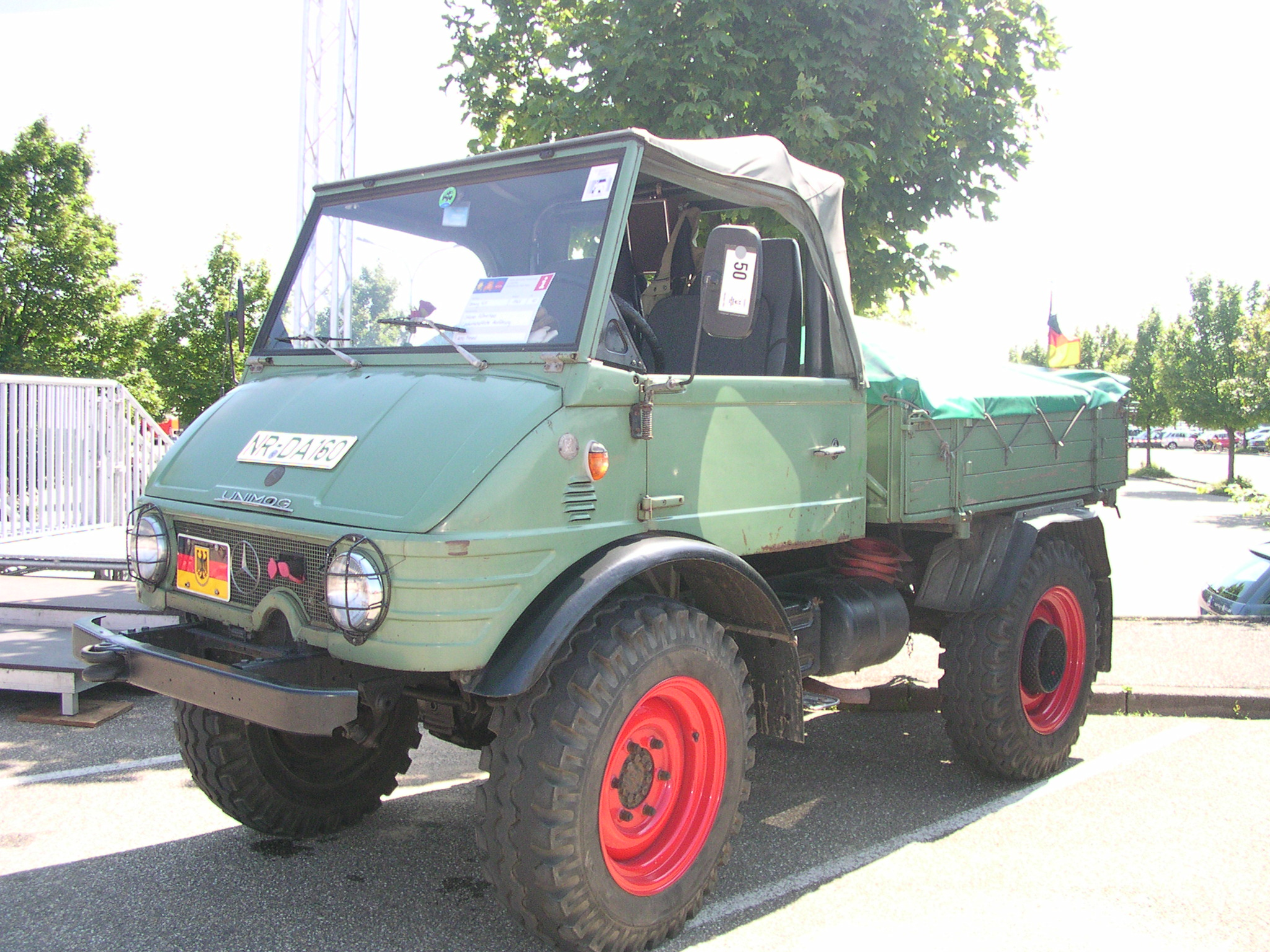
- An Unimog 421 Cabrio

Overview
- Type: Tractor
- Manufacturer: Daimler-Benz
- Also called: Unimog 431; Unimog U40; Unimog U45; Unimog U52; Unimog U60
- Production: 1966–1989
- Assembly: Germany: Gaggenau (Mercedes-Benz Gaggenau plant)

Powertrain
- Engine: OM 636; OM 621; OM 615; OM 616
- Transmission: Manual gearbox, 2×4 gears

Chronology
- Predecessor: Unimog 411
- Successor: Unimog 407

The Unimog 421 is a vehicle of the Mercedes-Benz Unimog series, made by Daimler-Benz. In total, 18,995 units of the Unimog 421 were built from 1966 to 1989 in the Mercedes-Benz Gaggenau plant. It is a medium-sized vehicle bigger than the traditional Unimog 411, but smaller than the Unimog 406. Introduction of new heavy models and Unimog 411 production ceasing in the mid-1970s changed the Unimog 421's role in the Unimog lineup; it became the predecessor of the light Unimog series and thus succeeded the Unimog 411.

Both short and long wheelbase versions, as well as "front half only" OEM part versions, were made. Technically, the Unimog 421 is based on the Unimog 406 and Unimog 411. The plane ladder frame and axles are Unimog 411 parts, and the engines used for the 421-series are also passenger car engines. Cab and gearbox are Unimog 406-related. The 421 closed cab version looks almost exactly like a 406-series cab, but the cabrio version is a bit more narrow and "squat". A 406-series can be differentiated from a 421-series by the position of the air-intake: A 421-series has the air-intake on the right-hand side of the bonnet, and a 406-series on the left-hand side.

In Argentina, a copy of the Unimog 421, the 431-series, was produced under licence. From 1969 to 1971, 601 cabrios and 152 closed cab units of the Unimog 431 were made. Daimler-Benz produced CKD-kits in Gaggenau, which were then shipped to Argentina for manufacture. The 431-series was fitted with a 44 kW (59 hp; 60 PS) engine, but has the short wheelbase – this combination was not available for the original 421-series.

== Engines ==
The 421-series was made with straight-four precombustion chamber Diesel engines. Prototypes included, four different engines were used, which are all passenger car engines.

Engine	Displacement	Rated power	Years
OM 636	1.767 L (107.8 in^{3})	40 PS (29 kW; 39 hp)	1964–1965 (Prototypes only)
OM 621	1.988 L (121.3 in^{3})	40 PS (29 kW; 39 hp)	1966–1968
OM 615	2.197 L (134.1 in^{3})	45 PS (33 kW; 44 hp)	1968–1970
OM 616	2.404 L (146.7 in^{3})	52 PS (38 kW; 51 hp) – 60 PS (44 kW; 59 hp)	1970–1989

== Types of the 421-series ==
In total 20 different types of the 421-series were made, out of which four were made as OEM parts for other manufacturers.

=== Mercedes-Benz types ===
Type	Model	Cab	Wheelbase	Rated power	Number manufactured	Notes
421.122	U40, U45	Cabrio	2,250 mm (88 5/8 in)	29 kW (39 hp; 39 PS), 33 kW (44 hp; 45 PS)	2.647	
421.123	U40, U45	Closed cab	2,250 mm (88 5/8 in)	29 kW (39 hp; 39 PS), 33 kW (44 hp; 45 PS)	3.215	
421.124	U52	Cabrio	2,250 mm (88 5/8 in)	38 kW (51 hp; 52 PS)	1.145	
421.125	U52	Closed cab	2,250 mm (88 5/8 in)	38 kW (51 hp; 52 PS)	1.995	
421.126	U60, U600L	Cabrio	2,605 mm (102 1/2 in)	44 kW (59 hp; 60 PS)	4	U 600 L: Crew cab
421.128	U60, U600L	Cabrio	2,605 mm (102 1/2 in)	44 kW (59 hp; 60 PS)	3.252	U 600 L: Crew cab
421.129	U60, U600L	Closed cab	2,605 mm (102 1/2 in)	44 kW (59 hp; 60 PS)	599	U 600 L: Crew cab
421.130	U40T, U45T, U55T	Cabrio	–	29 kW (39 hp; 39 PS), 33 kW (44 hp; 45 PS), 40 kW (54 hp; 54 PS)	6	OEM part
421.131	U40T, U45T, U55T	Closed cab	–	29 kW (39 hp; 39 PS), 33 kW (44 hp; 45 PS), 40 kW (54 hp; 54 PS)	210	OEM part
421.132	U60T, U600T	Cabrio	–	44 kW (59 hp; 60 PS)	35	OEM part
421.133	U60T, U600T	Closed cab	–	44 kW (59 hp; 60 PS)	372	OEM part
421.140	U52, U600	Cabrio	2,250 mm (88 5/8 in)	38 kW (51 hp; 52 PS)	1.805	
421.141	U52, U600	Closed cab	2,250 mm (88 5/8 in)	38 kW (51 hp; 52 PS)	3.368	
421.162	U60	Cabrio	2,605 mm (102 1/2 in)	44 kW (59 hp; 60 PS)	13	
421.163	U60	Closed cab	2,605 mm (102 1/2 in)	44 kW (59 hp; 60 PS)	25	
421.310	U421	Cabrio	2,250 mm (88 5/8 in)	41 kW (55 hp; 56 PS)	304	

=== Types made for third party manufacturers ===
Several Unimog 421 types were custom-made as OEM parts for third party manufacturers.

Type	Third party manufacturer	Model	Engine power	Number manufactured
421.160	Hoes	Knickschlepper		
421.164	Werner Forst- und Industrietechnik	Uniknick UK52, UK60	38 kW (51 hp; 52 PS), 44 kW (59 hp; 60 PS)	75
421.170	Tractortecnic	Unitrac UT45	38 kW (51 hp; 52 PS)	50
421.172	Trenkle	Tremo	38 kW (51 hp; 52 PS)	250

== Technical specifications ==
	U 40	U 45	U 52	U 60
Years	1966–1971	1966–1971	1970–1988	1971–1988
Mass	2,450 kg (5,400 lb)	2,470 kg (5,450 lb)	2,850 kg (6,280 lb)	
Permissible maximum mass	3,700 kg (8,200 lb)	4,000 kg (8,800 lb)	4,100 kg (9,000 lb)	?
Length	4,005 mm (157 11/16 in)		4,020 mm (158 1/4 in)	
Width	1,865 mm (73 7/16 in)		1,825 mm (71 7/8 in)	1,800 mm (70 7/8 in)
Height	2,180 mm (85 13/16 in)		2,230 mm (87 13/16 in)	
Wheelbase	2,250 mm (88 9/16 in)			2,605 mm (102 9/16 in)
Track width	1,360 mm (53 9/16 in)		1,400 mm (55 1/8 in)	
Bed length	1,475 mm (58 1/16 in)		1,750 mm (68 7/8 in)	
Bed width	1,500 mm (59 1/16 in)			
Bed board wall height	400 mm (15 3/4 in)			
Tyres	10,5–18″ 6PR			
Engine type	OM 621	OM 615	OM 616	
Engine design	Water-cooled straight-four Diesel engine			
Fuel system	Precombustion chamber injection			
Displacement	1.988 L (121.3 cu in)	2.197 L (134.1 cu in)	2.404 L (146.7 cu in)	
Bore × Stroke	87 mm × 83.6 mm (3.43 in × 3.29 in)	87 mm × 92.4 mm (3.43 in × 3.64 in)	91 mm × 92.4 mm (3.58 in × 3.64 in)	
Rated power (DIN 70020)	40 PS (29 kW; 39 hp)	45 PS (33 kW; 44 hp)	52 PS (38 kW; 51 hp)	60 PS (44 kW; 59 hp)
Top speed	54 km/h (34 mph)	53 km/h (33 mph)	67 km/h (42 mph)	
Source				

== Gallery ==
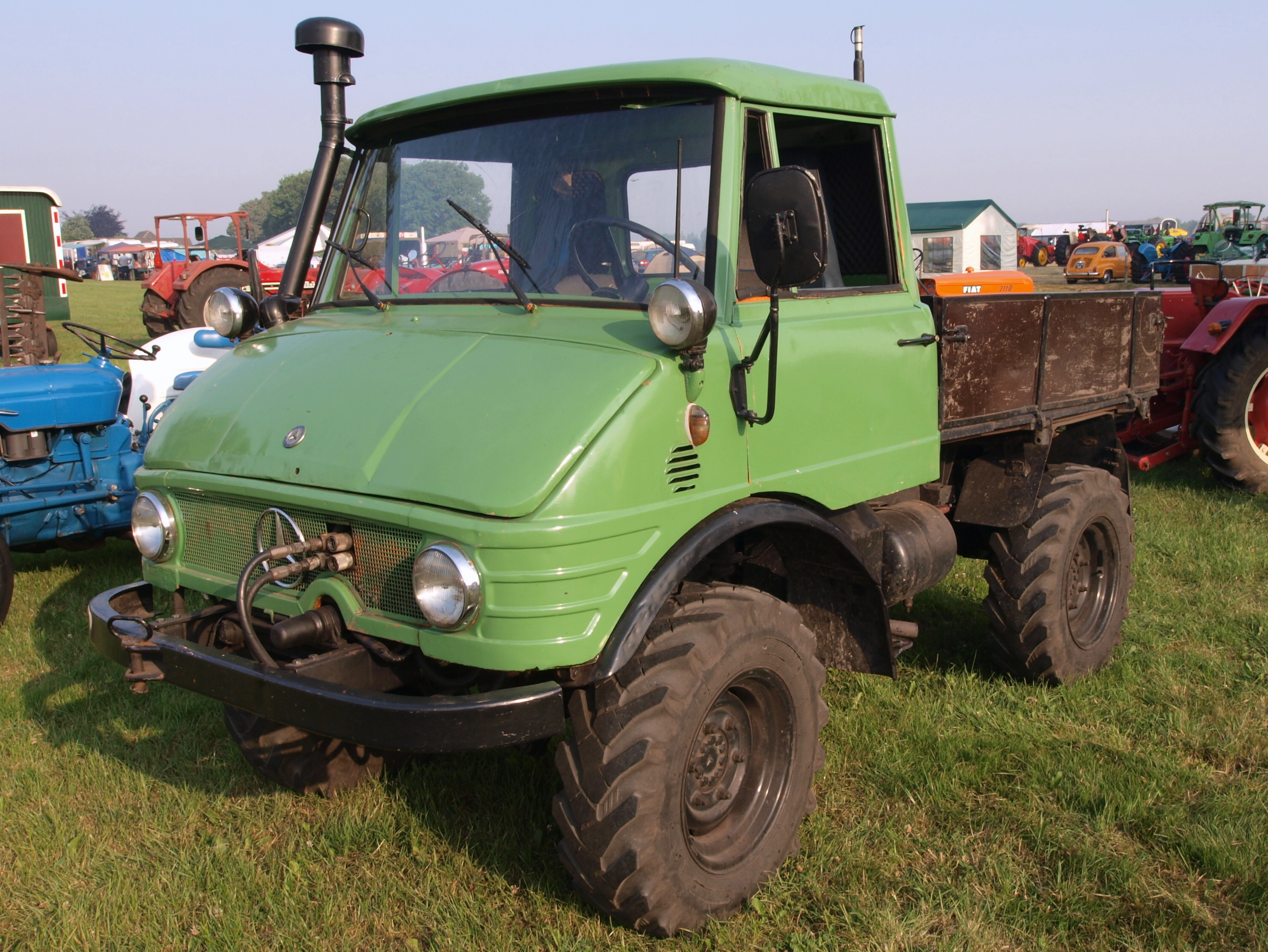
Unimog 421 with closed cab and snorkel

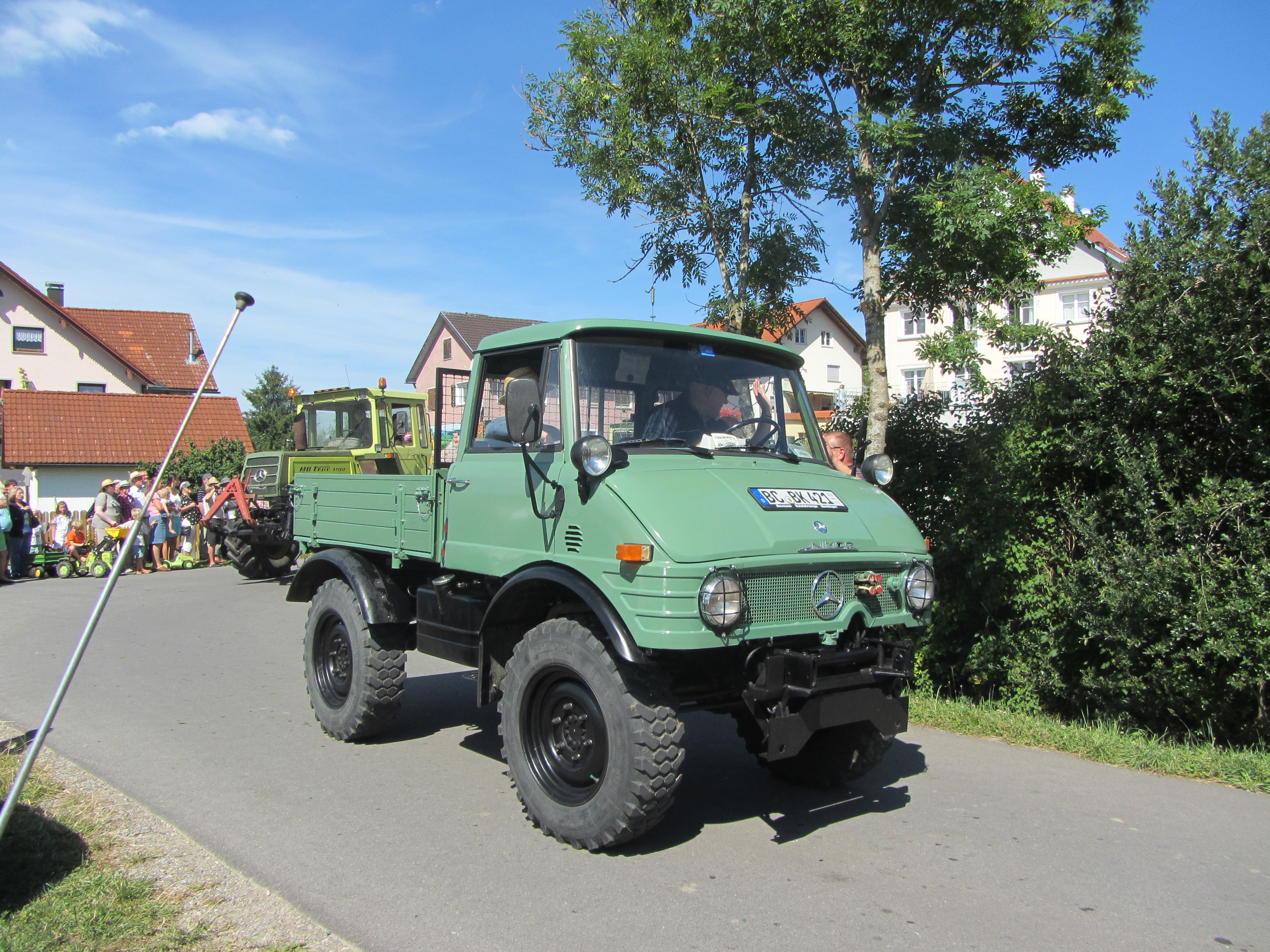
Unimog 421 with closed cab

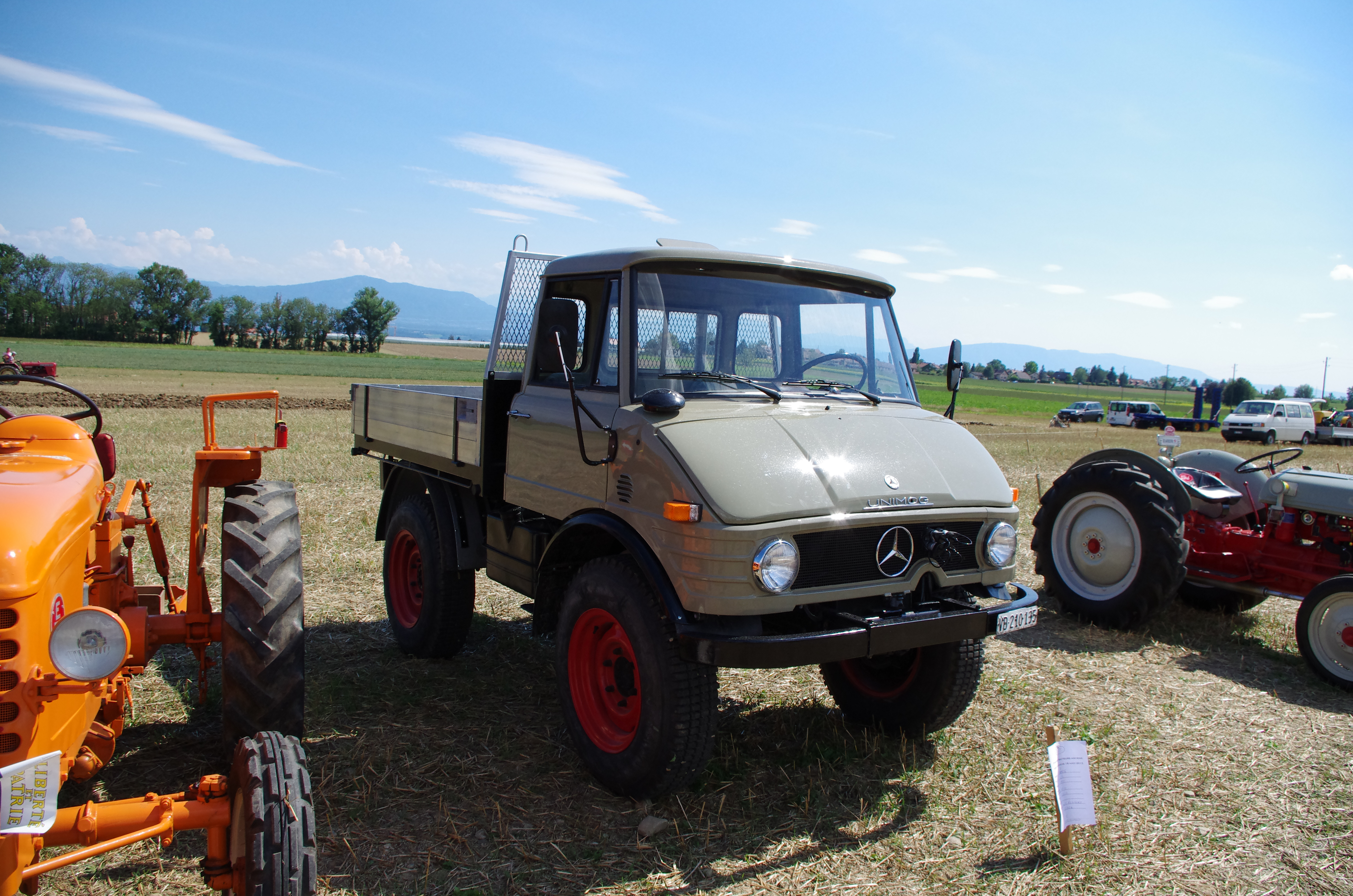
Unimog 421 with closed cab, 1971

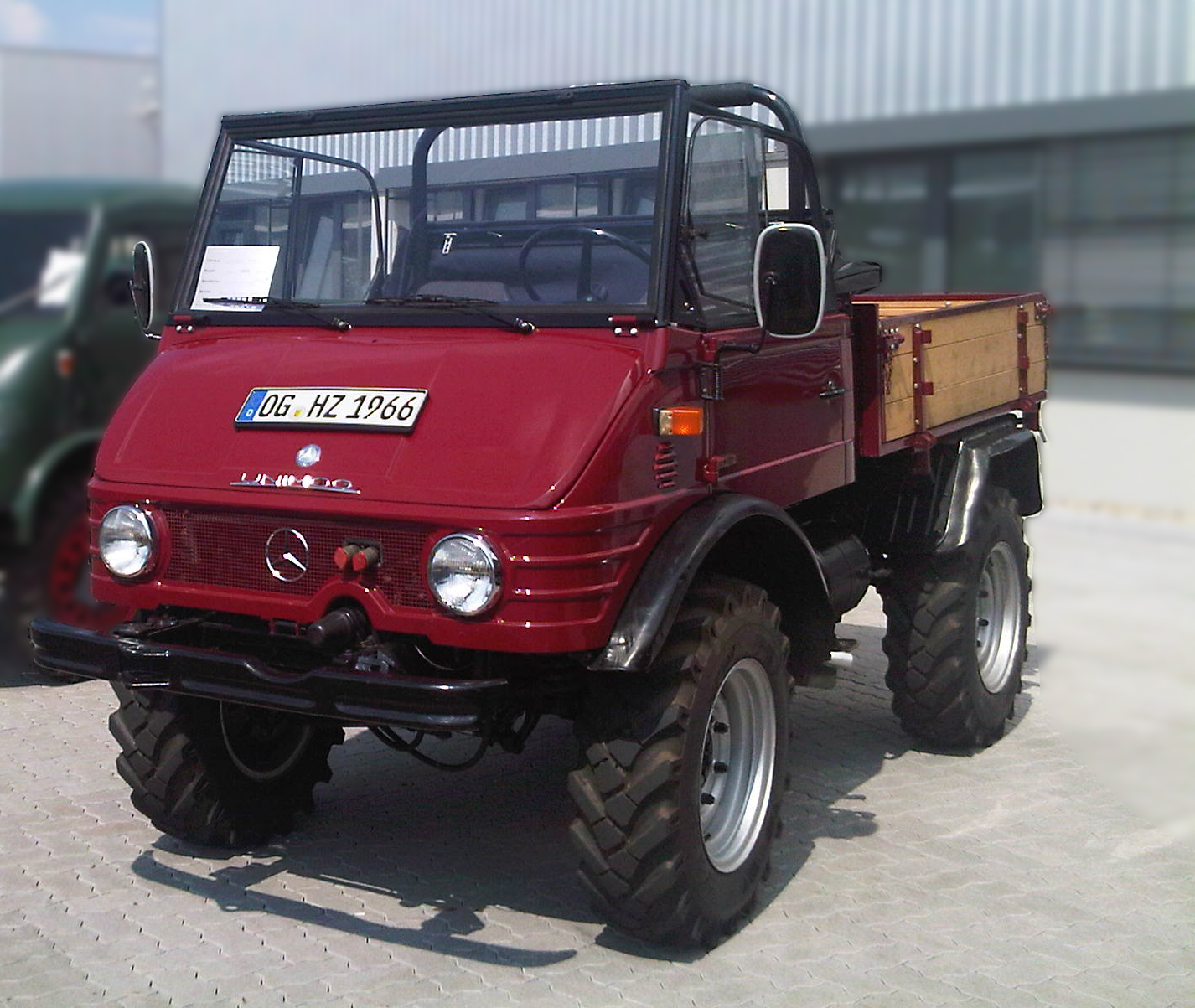
Unimog 421 Cabrio

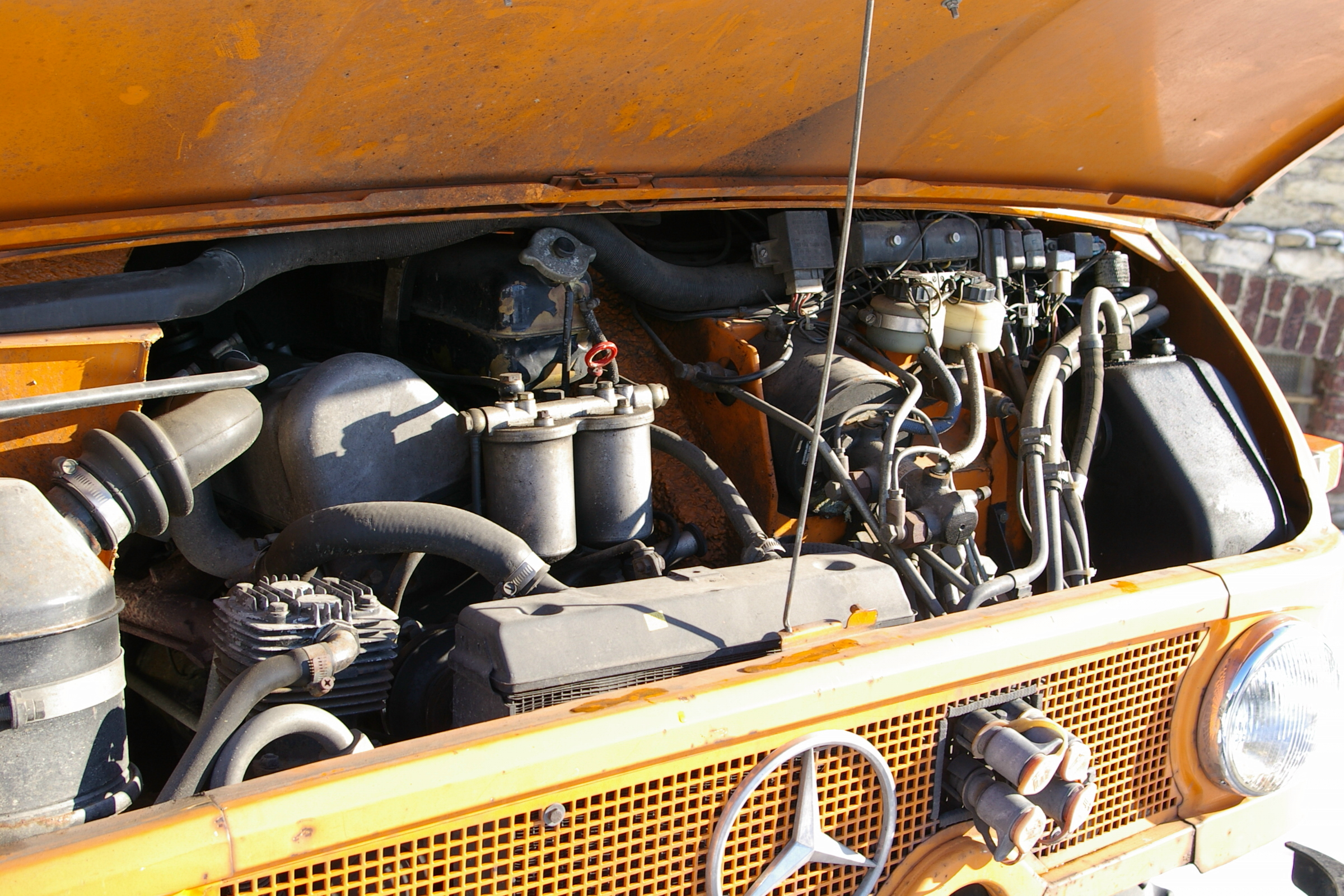
OM 616 engine
