= Unimog 401 =

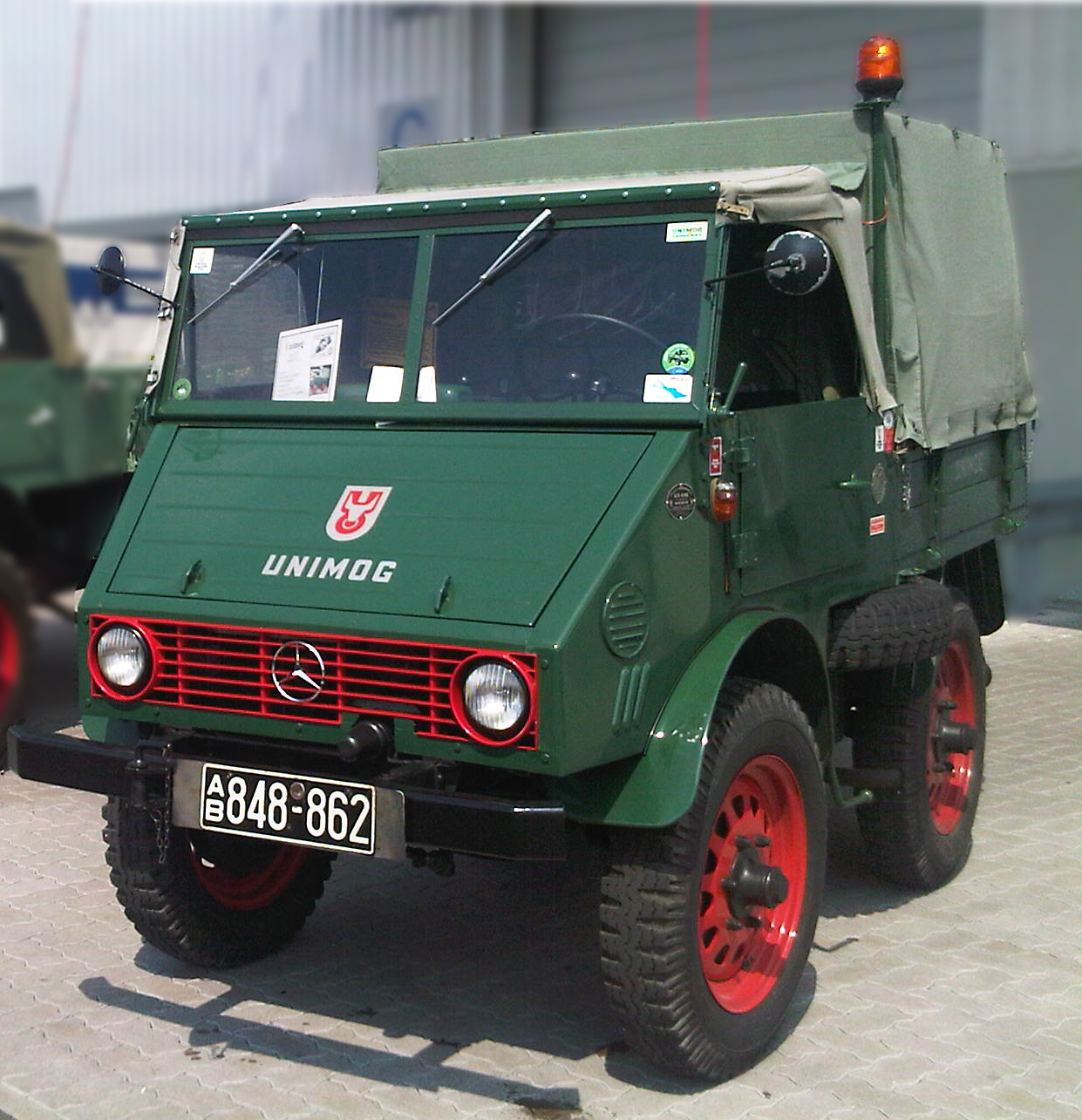
- Unimog 401

Overview
- Type: Tractor
- Manufacturer: Daimler-Benz AG
- Also called: Unimog; Unimog U25
- Production: 1953–1956
- Assembly: Germany: Gaggenau (Mercedes-Benz Gaggenau plant)

Body and chassis
- Related: Unimog 402

Powertrain
- Engine: 1.7 L OM 636 I4 (diesel)
- Transmission: 6-speed manual gearbox, two reverse gears

Dimensions
- Wheelbase: 1,720 mm (67.7 in) (401); 2,120 mm (83.5 in) (402)
- Length: 3,520 mm (138.6 in)
- Width: 1,630 mm (64.2 in)
- Height: 2,050 mm (80.7 in)
- Kerb weight: 1,680 kg (3,704 lb)

Chronology
- Predecessor: Unimog 2010
- Successor: Unimog 411

The Unimog 401 is an all-wheel-drive vehicle of the Unimog-series by Mercedes-Benz, developed as a tractor and equipment carrier. It was produced by Daimler-Benz in the Unimog plant in Gaggenau from 1953 to 1956. A total of 16,250 Unimog 401 and 402 were made.

Initially, the Unimog 401 was made in the cabrio version only. The closed cab model Froschauge (German for frog-eye), with a cab made by Westfalia-Werke, was introduced in September 1953. An increased wheelbase model was developed, bearing model type 402. Both models were succeeded by the Unimog 411, available in both long and short wheelbases.

== History ==
After World War II, German engineer Albert Friedrich built the first Universalmotorgerät, but Daimler-Benz declined to put it into series production. Manufacturer Boehringer in Göppingen on the other hand was interested and produced a prototype for the 1948 DLG-exhibition in Frankfurt. The Unimog attracted much interest, encouraging Boehringer to begin series production. Until 1950, approximately 600 Unimog 70.200 were made; their brand logo was an ox-head with U-shaped horns. In late 1950, Daimler-Benz purchased Boehringer moving Unimog production to Gaggenau, beginning series production in May 1951. Initially, the Unimog's type number was 2010, changing to 401 in 1953, with the 401 becoming a new type. The Unimog 401 was the first Unimog to receive the Mercedes star on its grille.

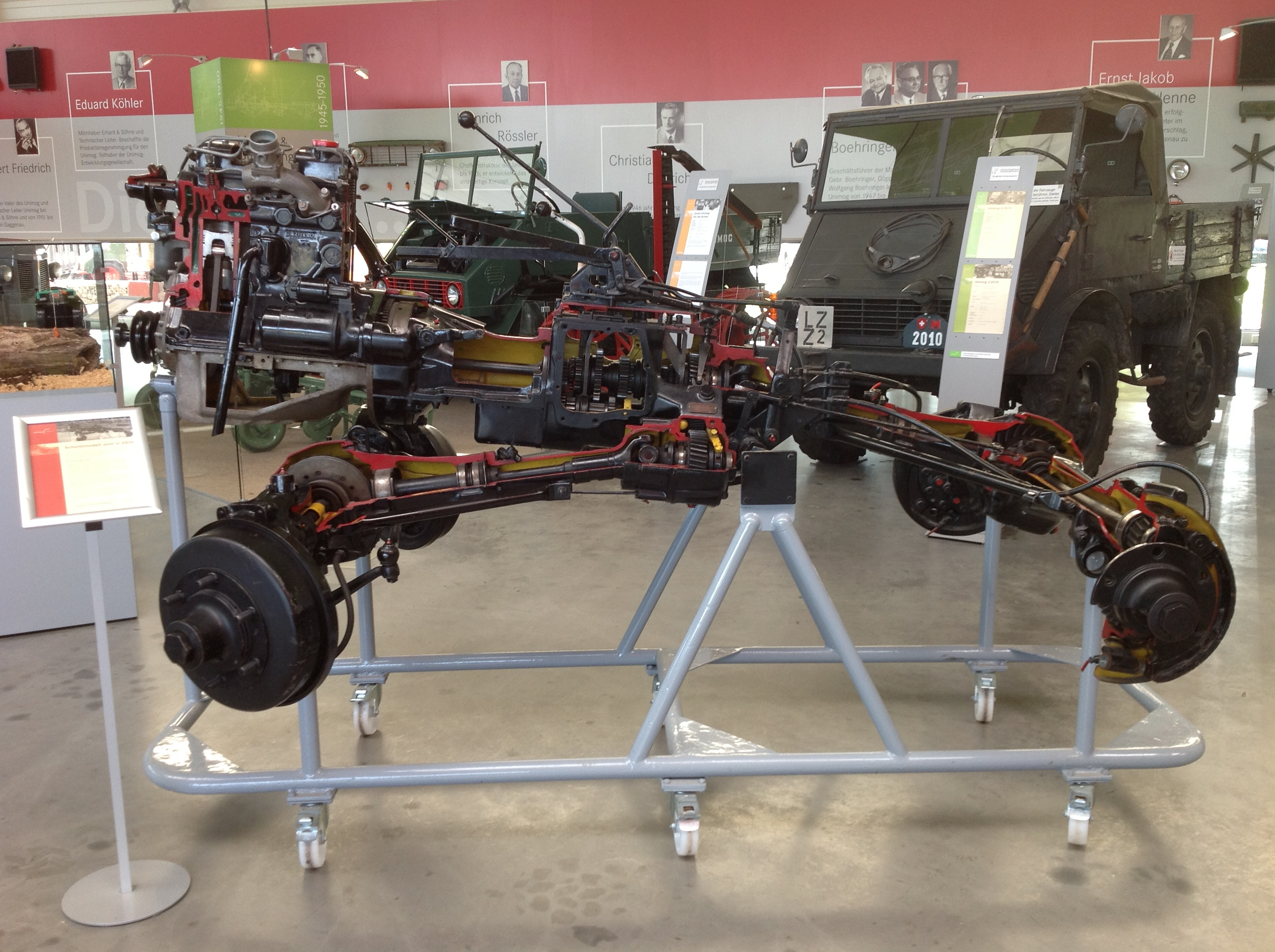
Unimog 401: Chassis cutaway model in the Unimog Museum

== Technical description ==
The Unimog 401 is a very compact vehicle with an approximate length of just 3.5 metres (11 ft 5 3/4 in). It has a U-shaped ladder frame, beam portal axles both in the rear and front, with four same-sized wheels. Each axle has additional reduction gears built in. Both front and rear axles are supported by a central joint and panhard rods. The 401 has coil springs and hydraulic shock absorbers. Daimler-Benz used 6.5–20" multi-purpose tyres, that are designed for both on and off-road applications. The brake system is hydraulic, the 401 having drum brakes for each wheel. The 401 has a wheelbase of 1,720 mm (67 3/4 in); the 402, 2,120 mm (83 1/2 in).

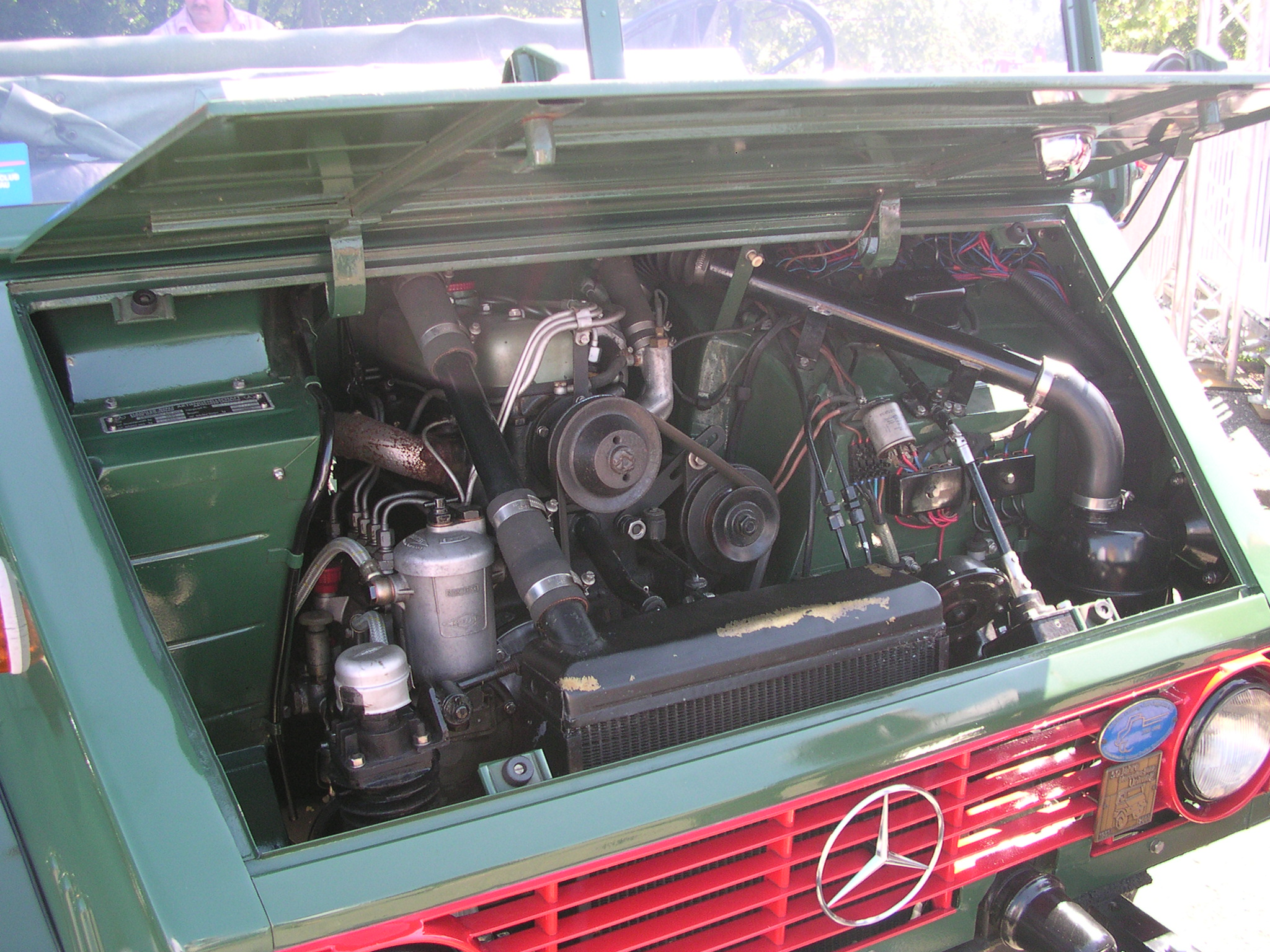
Engine OM 636 of the Unimog 401

=== Engine and gearbox ===
The 401 uses a car engine, type OM 636 VI. It is a water-cooled naturally aspirated straight-four-diesel with precombustion chamber injection, OHV-valvetrain and a displacement of 1,767 cm^{3} (1.767 L; 107.8 cu in). Its standard power output is 40 PS (39 hp; 29 kW), reduced to 25 PS (25 hp; 18 kW) at 2350 rpm for the Unimog. The OM 636 is mounted slightly inclined towards the rear, in the front of the Unimog. It has an electric starter.

The Unimog 401 uses a Daimler-Benz six-speed constant-mesh gearbox with two additional reverse gears. It has clutch-independent switchable all-wheel drive and differential locks for the front and rear axles. The clutch is a Fichtel & Sachs single-disc-dry-clutch. Daimler-Benz offered an additional two-speed crawler-gearbox as a factory option.

=== Features and accessories ===
The 401 uses a 150 W Bosch alternator, a 12 V / 105 Ah lead-acid battery, two headlights, two rear lamps, electric trafficators, windscreen wipers and a horn. A plug socket for a trailer was offered as a factory option.

A flatbed is mounted on the rear, measuring 1,500 mm × 1,500 mm (59 1/16 in × 59 1/16 in), designed for a payload of 1,000 kg (2,200 lb). The 401 has a spring-mounted hitch in the rear and a standard hitch in the front. For additional equipment, it has an anchor rail.

For power take-off, the Unimog was available with front and rear PTOs (DIN 9611, 540 rpm). The rated power is approximately 22 PS (22 hp; 16 kW). A 315 mm (12 3/8 in) belt pulley was also available, with an output power of 22 PS (22 hp; 16 kW). Daimler-Benz also offered a spare wheel, rear twin tyres, a trailer-brake-system, a winch, a mowing bar and air compressors for the 401.

The previous Unimog 2010 was offered as a cabrio with a foldable top, a concealing windscreen, removable side windows and a rigid rear panel. It was available in the colour Unimog-grün. After developing the 2010 into the 401, the closed cab was offered. The cabrio version then became Version A while the cab-version became Version A/F. Unimogs with a trailer-brake-system were called Version B and Version B/F. Unimogs with a closed cab were available in the paint colours Unimog-grün, hellgrau and Mercedes-blau.

== Technical specifications ==
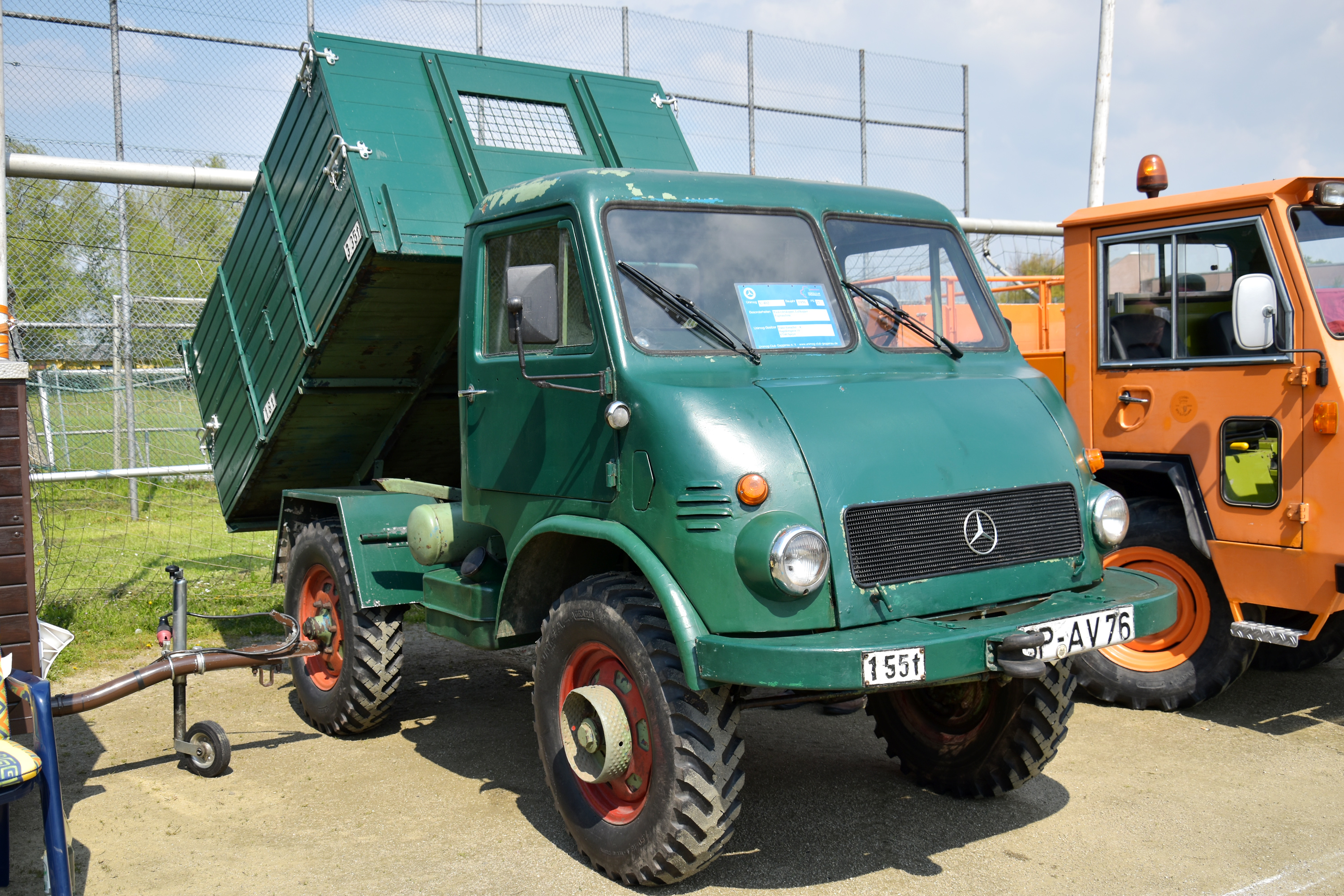
Unimog 402 long wheelbase (2170 mm)

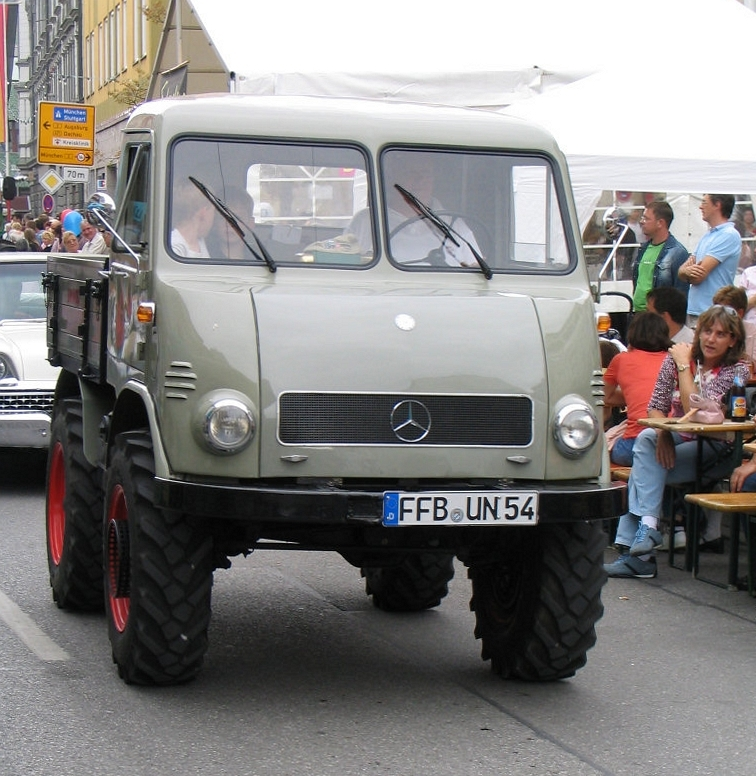
Unimog 401 Froschauge with Westfalia-cab

	Unimog 401
Measurements and weights
Track width	1,270 mm (50 in); 1,470 mm (57 7/8 in) (after switching wheels)
Wheelbase	1,720 mm (67 11/16 in)
Ground clearance	380 mm (14 15/16 in)
Length	3,520 mm (138 9/16 in)
Width	1,630 mm (64 3/16 in)
Height	2,050 mm (80 11/16 in) (with foldable top)
Turning clearance circle diameter	7,600 mm (24 ft 11 3/16 in)
Bed	1.5 m × 1.5 m (59 1/16 in × 59 1/16 in), 2.25 m^{2} (24.2 sq ft)
Mass	1,680 kg (3,700 lb)
Payload	1,000 kg (2,200 lb)
max. allowed mass	3,150 kg (6,940 lb)
Drive train
Torque transmission to	rear wheels, switchable all-wheel drive
Gearbox	Daimler-Benz six-speed constant-mesh gearbox, two reverse gears
Clutch	Single-disc-dry-clutch by Fichtel & Sachs
Top speed	53 km/h (33 mph)
Fuel consumption	10 L/100 km (28 mpg_{‑imp}; 24 mpg_{‑US})
Engine
Type	OM 636 VI
Layout	Straight-four diesel with precombustion chamber injection, OHV-Valvetrain
Cooling system	Water
Bore × Stroke	75 mm × 100 mm (2.95 in × 3.94 in)
Displacement	1,767 cm^{3} (107.8 in^{3})
Compression ratio	19 : 1
Rated power (DIN 70020)	25 PS (18 kW; 25 hp) at 2350 rpm
Max. torque (DIN 70020)	10.3 kp⋅m (101 N⋅m; 75 lbf⋅ft) at 2000 rpm

=== Production figures ===
Year	Production figures
1953	711
1954	2544
1955	4149
1956	3000
Sum	10404

== Bibliography ==
- Werner Oswald: Mercedes-Benz Lastwagen und Omnibusse 1886–1986. Motorbuch Verlag Stuttgart, 2008, ISBN 978-3-613-02943-9.
