= Anton Schlüter München =

German tractor manufacturer

- Type: GmbH
- Industry: Agricultural tractors
- Founded: 1898
- Defunct: 1995
- Headquarters: Munich, Bavaria (Germany)
- Products: Tractors; Diesel engines
- Website: schlueter-trac.de (in German)

Anton Schlüter München was a German tractor manufacturer in the region of Munich, Bavaria. Amongst farmers and tractor enthusiasts, this brand is usually known simply, as Schlüter.

== History ==
The company Anton Schlüter München was founded in 1899, by councillor of commerce (German: Kommerzienrat) Anton Schlüter. In the beginning, the primary corporate objective was the production of gasoline engines and multi-fuel engines. Twelve years after the company founding, Anton Schlüter acquired his own foundry. It was located in Freising, a town near Munich. In 1910, new buildings were constructed by the architects Jakob Heilmann and Max Littmann.A year later, Schlüter built a test area, the so-called Schlüterhof.

== Tractor building ==
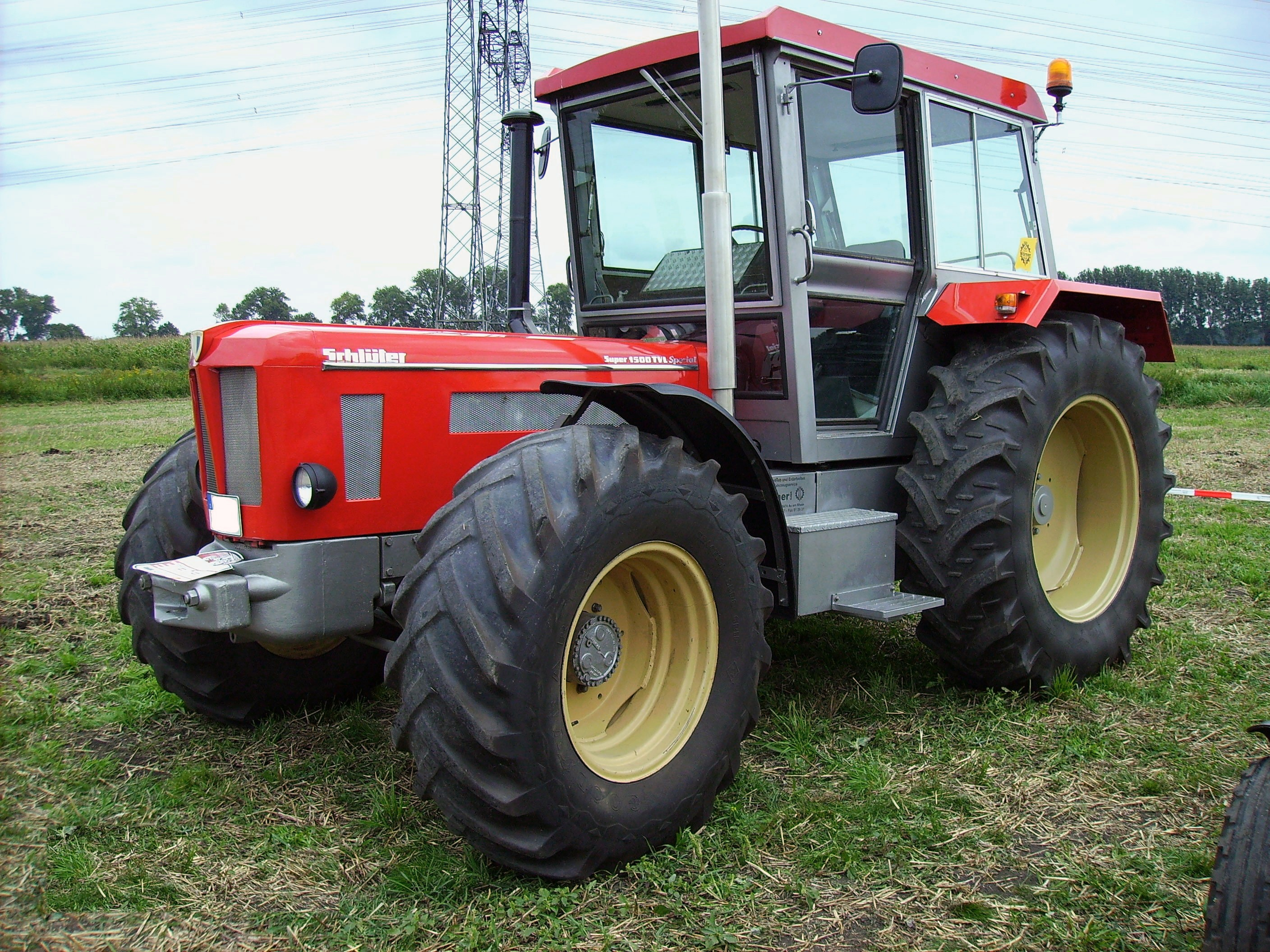
A Schlüter Super 1500 tractor

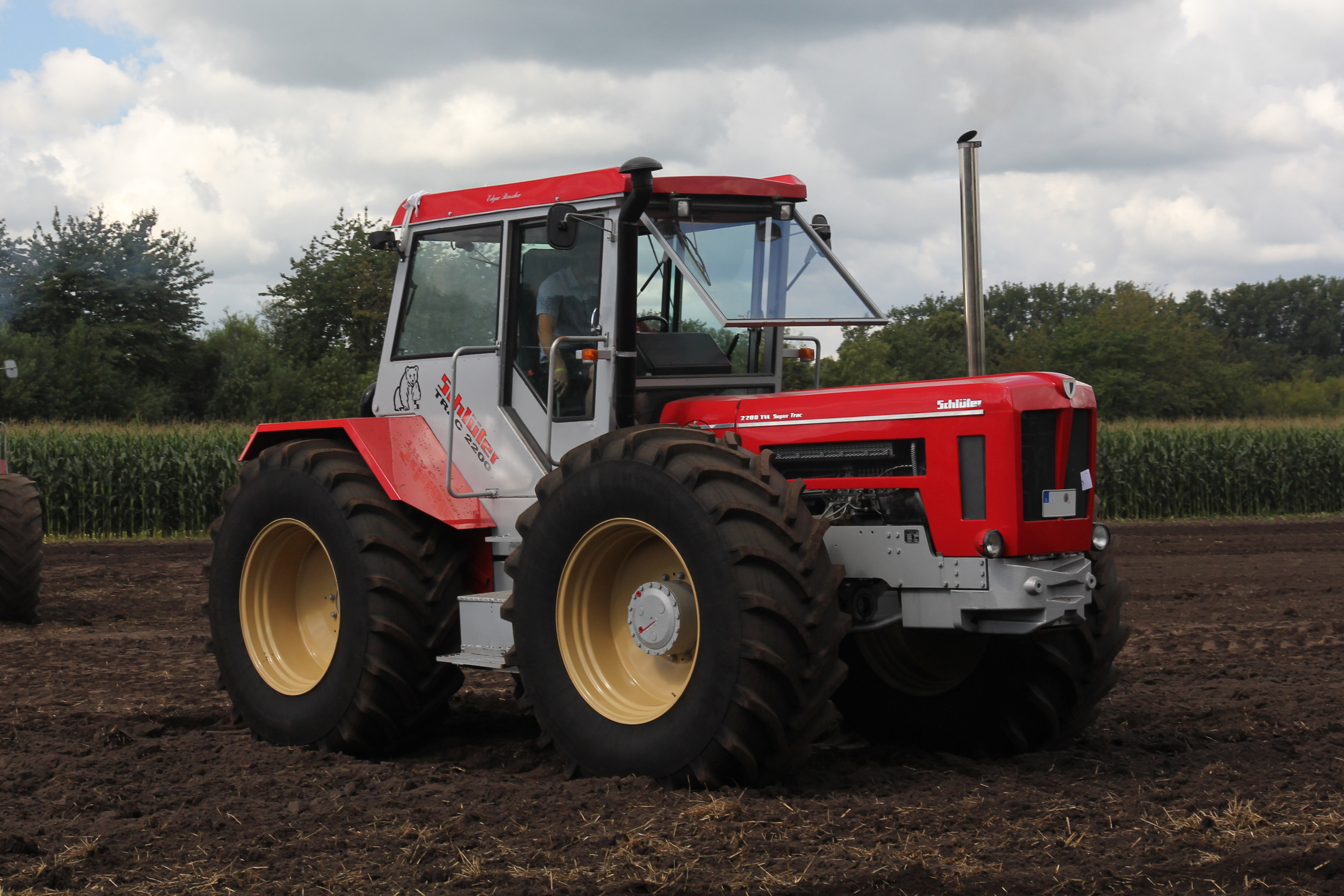
Schlüter Super Trac 2200 TVL

In 1937, Schlüter launched the production of tractors. Because the Second World War caused a lack of gasoline, starting with year 1942, production started of tractors and generators powered by wood gasifiers with a power range of 25 to 50 PS. Caused by air raids, targeting Munich and Freising, most of the plant in Munich and the foundry in Freising were destroyed by bombs. When Anton Schlüter (junior) took over business after the death of his father in 1949, he decided not to rebuild the facilities in Munich. Instead of having both Munich and Freising locations, the whole company was moved to Freising. Freising was the only place where the headquarters and all compartments of production were concentrated. Starting in the year 1964, Schlüter specialized in tractors of the upper power range of up to 320 PS. Quite an exception in that era were tractors which obtained four equal-sized wheels, represented by the Super Trac series. The more upmarket Profi Trac series also featured four equal-sized wheels, but in addition to that, had rear-wheel steering. The rear axle of the Profi Trac series could steer in the opposite or same direction as the front axle. In 1978, a unique model was built, the so-called Profi Trac 5000 TVL with a 500 PS engine. At its appearance, it was regarded as the most powerful tractor in Europe. One reason for the construction of this tractor was an order from the former Yugoslavian president Tito. But the idea of a series production of this type was cancelled, caused by political changes in the former Yugoslavia. Nowadays, the only existing Profi Trac 5000 TVL is possessed by a private collector. In 1989, Schlüter presented a new line of products. Its name was Euro Trac. Specific for these new tractors were the driver cabs in the middle of the tractor, together with relocatable ballast weight, placed on top of the front axis. More or less, this tractor was similar to the MB-trac. Despite this latest development, the competition amongst tractor producing companies was rough at that time. Schlüter suffered a technical delay in those years. Furthermore, one of the results of the German Reunification was that the demand of so-called system tractors (German:Systemtraktoren) changed. The specialist term system tractors describes tractors, which offer a third or fourth opportunity to fix machines or containers, like above the front or the rear axle. For instance, the MB-trac or Fendt GT were considered as system tractors, also the Unimog or the Fastrac. Generally, the demand of such tractors decreased, while more powerful standard tractors were required. As a result of all those circumstances, only 184 Euro Trac tractors were built until Schlüter went bankrupt.

== Type series ==
Until the end of production in Freising, there were four main lines of tractors, which are worth to be named:
“Super” and “Compact” were standard tractors
“Super Trac”, a tractor with same-size tyres
“Profi Trac”, a tractor with same-size tyres and two steerable axles
“Euro Trac”, the last development by the company

== Peculiarities ==
The Schlüter emblem consists of a bear, with a letter S in its front. The letter S stands for Schlüter whilst the bear signifies endurance, power and heavy duty working ability. Ahead of the bonnet there is a coat of arms. It contains the lettering Schlüter, below it there is an area, divided in white and blue.

A recognition mark of Schlüter was the scheme of colouring. Since the 1960 years, there were two dominating colours: Silver for the chassis and parts of the driver's cab, red colour for all parts made of sheet metal (engine hood, fenders, roof). The wheels of a huge number of Schlüter tractors obtained a further colour. It had been khaki until it was substituted by silver, which occurred in the late 1980 years.

Quite an advantage of Schlüter was the very good accessibility of the motor, gearbox and both axles. This was facilitated by a hydraulically pivoting driver's cab and a hinged engine bonnet.

One more singularity was the distinctive design of the driver's cab. The windscreens were inclined in the opposite sense, similar to the driver's platform of a combine harvester. The rear screen was even more inclined than on any other “usual” tractor. Another characteristic mark were the sliding doors of the cabin on left and right side. At the time of its first presentation, this driver's cabin was quite distinctive compared to all other contemporary tractors.

== Shutdown of the establishment ==
In December 1993, Schlüter finished its production at the plant in Freising except the Euro Trac series. Thereafter, another company showed interest in the Euro Trac. Landtechnik Schönebeck, a manufacturer of agricultural machinery in the former German Democratic Republic, the Euro Trac was produced in Eastern Germany. Even there, only 32 Euro Trac were built. Then, another company took over the Euro Trac from Landtechnik Schönebeck: Until 2004, some more Euro Trac were produced by Egelseer, located in Fürth (a town close to Nuremberg). Today, the Egelseer company is the general supplier of spare parts and also an advisor in any technical matters in regards to Schlüter tractors.

The closed factory facilities of Schlüter in Freising were unused for more than ten years. Because of its age and its former significance, the former Schlüter buildings were declared a cultural heritage. The hangars were renovated and changed in their purpose. Nowadays they are used as a shopping mall. There, a Schlüter tractor holds place as a reminding monument of the former utilization of the buildings.

Anton Schlüter himself died in summer of the year 1999. Up to the present, there is a large number of Schlüter fan clubs in Germany and other countries. They pay tribute to the Schlüter brand, to its remarkable history and to the tractors of Schlüter. One of the activities of these clubs is the arrangement of reunion events. Furthermore, many Schlüter tractors enjoy a high appreciation by their fans. Nowadays, a large number of the remaining tractors are regarded as individually valuable and are repaired and maintained very well.
