= WF trac =

Tractor model

The WF trac is a skidder made by Werner Forst & Industrietechnik Scharf. It was developed from the MB-trac in the 1990s.

== Models ==
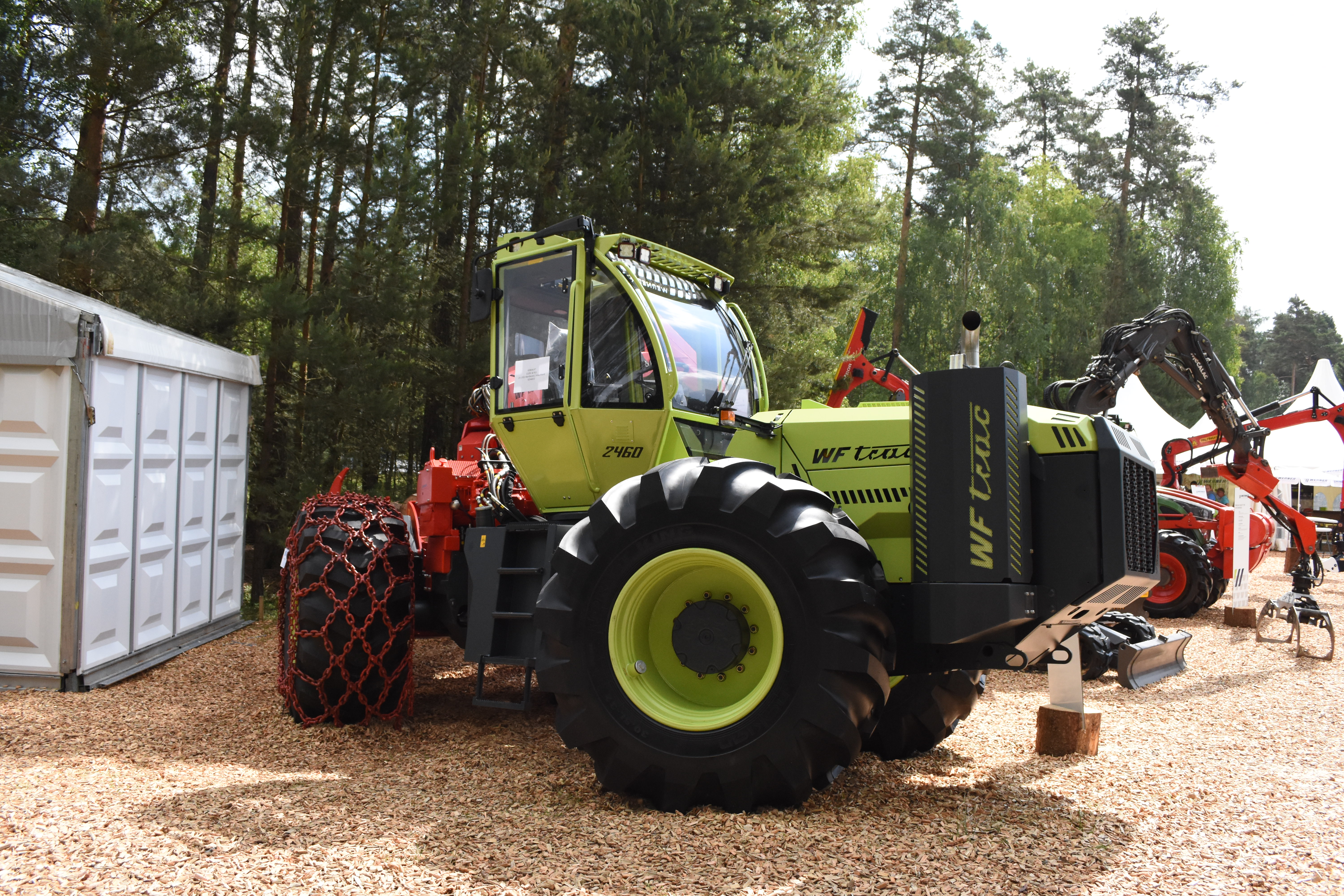
WF trac 2460

=== First series WF trac ===
- WF trac 900 (92 PS (68 kW))
- WF trac 1100 (105 PS (77 kW))
- WF trac 1300 (136 PS (100 kW))
- WF trac 1500 (150 PS (110 kW))
- WF trac 1700 (177 PS (130 kW))

=== Second and current series WF trac ===
The WF trac is now produced both in a 4x4 and a 6x6 version. Its maximum road speed is 50 km/h (31 mph) in the 4x4 and 40 km/h (25 mph) in the 6x6 variant.

- WF trac 2040 4x4 (204 PS (150 kW), 800 N·m torque, 4.8 litres 4-cyl Mercedes-Benz engine)
- WF trac 2040 6x6 (204 PS (150 kW), 800 N·m torque, 4.8 litres 4-cyl Mercedes-Benz engine)
- WF trac 2460 4x4 (238 PS (175 kW), 850 N·m torque, 7.2 litres 6-cyl Mercedes-Benz engine)
- WF trac 2460 6x6 (238 PS (175 kW), 850 N·m torque, 7.2 litres 6-cyl Mercedes-Benz engine)
