= Schlüter Profi Trac 5000 TVL =

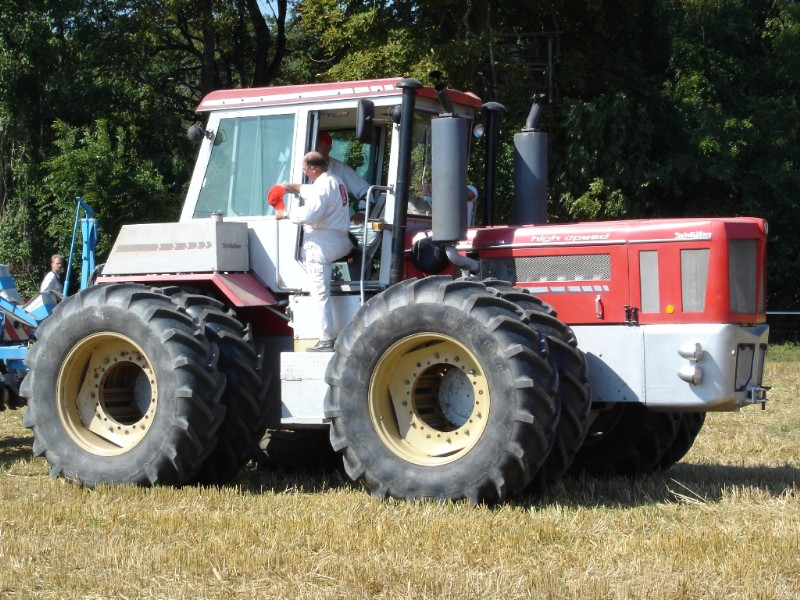
- Type: agricultural tractor without PTO
- Manufacturer: Anton Schlüter München
- Production: 1978
- Length: 6250 mm
- Width: 2720 mm
- Height: 3460 mm
- Weight: 18,000 kg
- Propulsion: same-size wheels
- Engine model: MAN D 2542 MTE twin-turbo V12 Diesel
- Engine displacement: 20,911 cm^{3}
- Transmission: ZF 4 S-150 GPA non-reversible, manual eight-speed gearbox ZF WSK 400 hydraulic torque converter, dry clutch unit
- Wheelbase: 2890 mm
- Track: 2220 mm
- Gross power: 382 kW
- Flywheel power: 368 kW
- Speed: 3.7…29.0 km/h

The Schlüter Profi Trac 5000 TVL is an agricultural tractor made by Anton Schlüter München. It is their biggest, and most powerful tractor.

Although it was presented to the public at the 55th DLG fair in 1978 as a series-production model, only one unit was ever built. Schlüter had planned to sell Profi Trac 5000 TVL tractors to former Yugoslavia, but due to political changes, no tractors were ever sold there. Instead, Schlüter used the Profi Trac 5000 TVL as a demonstrator throughout the 1980s. Eventually, after Schlüter was dissolved, the tractor was sold.

== Technical description ==
The Profi Trac 5000 TVL is a tractor exclusively designed for pulling trailers or farm implements that do not require PTO power. It has four same-size wheels, permanent all-wheel drive, and a single ladder frame (i. e. it is not an articulated tractor).

=== Axles and wheels ===
Both the front and the rear unsprung ZF APL 8 L beam axles are technically designed as 11,000 kp (110 kN; 24,000 lbf) front axles (so-called fork axles), and thus both allow individual steering. The Profi Trac 5000 TVL has three steering modes – "conventional" steering (only the front axle is used as a steering axle), opposed four-wheel steering, and same-direction four-wheel steering. On all wheels, the tractor has hydraulic disc brakes, and 20.8 by 38 inch tyres; the Profi Trac 5000 TVL can also be equipped with twin tyres, as seen in the infobox picture.

=== Engine ===
Schlüter chose to equip the Profi Trac 5000 TVL with an MAN D 2542 MTE industrial V12 diesel engine. This water-cooled engine displaces 20.9 dm^{3} (1,280 in^{3}), features MAN's M-System direct-injection system, and is fitted with a twin-turbo forced induction setup. From the factory, the engine has a DIN-70020-rated power of 382 kW (512 hp) at 2300/min, but for the Profi Trac 5000 TVL, the injection pump was slightly detuned to reduce the DIN-70020-rated power to 368 kW (493 hp) at 2200/min. The BMEP is 1.04 MPa (151 lbf/in^{2}), and the rated fuel consumption is 217 g/(kW⋅h) (0.357 lb/(hp⋅h)).

=== Transmission ===
The Profi Trac 5000 TVL is fitted with a manual ZF 4 S-150 GPA synchromesh gearbox. It has nine gears, of which eight are forward gears, and of which one is a reverse gear. The reverse gear is necessary, because the tractor has no reverse gearbox or splitter gearbox (thus, the Profi Trac 5000 TVL has no PTO). Schlüter employed a shifting concept with traction interruption instead of power shifting, which means that, the torque transmission from the engine to the wheels has to be interrupted for shifting gears. The Profi Trac 5000 TVL has a ZF WSK 400 clutch unit that contains both a hydraulic torque converter, and a dry clutch. The hydraulic torque converter increases both the torque and reduces the wear on the clutch – it is only used for setting off in first gear, after which it is locked up; shifting gears requires normal clutch operating. The system allows using the engine braking torque.
