= MB-trac =

German range of agricultural tractors made by Daimler-Benz

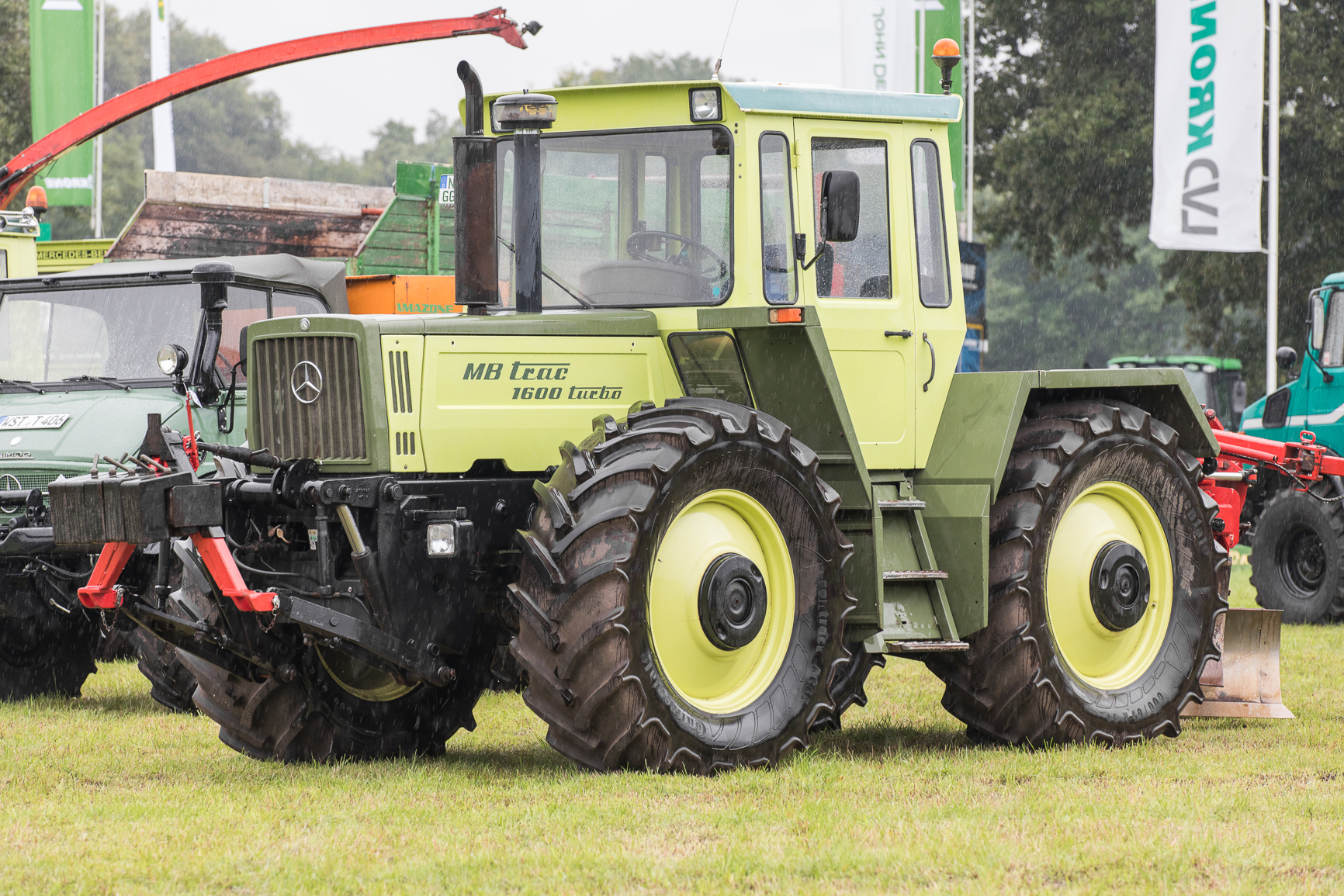
- MB-trac 1600 turbo
- Type: agricultural
- Manufacturer: Daimler-Benz AG
- Production: 1973–1991
- Propulsion: Equal-size wheels

MB-trac is a range of agricultural tractors developed and produced from 1973 until 1991 by Mercedes-Benz Group, formerly known as Daimler-Benz. It is based on the trac design principle for tractors and shares its drivetrain with the Unimog. Mercedes-Benz offered the MB-trac in light duty, medium-duty, and heavy-duty versions in four different type series: 440, 441, 442 and 443. About 41,000 MB-tracs were made by former Daimler-Benz, before the production ended on December 17th 1991.

== MB-trac types and model family ==
=== Naming scheme ===
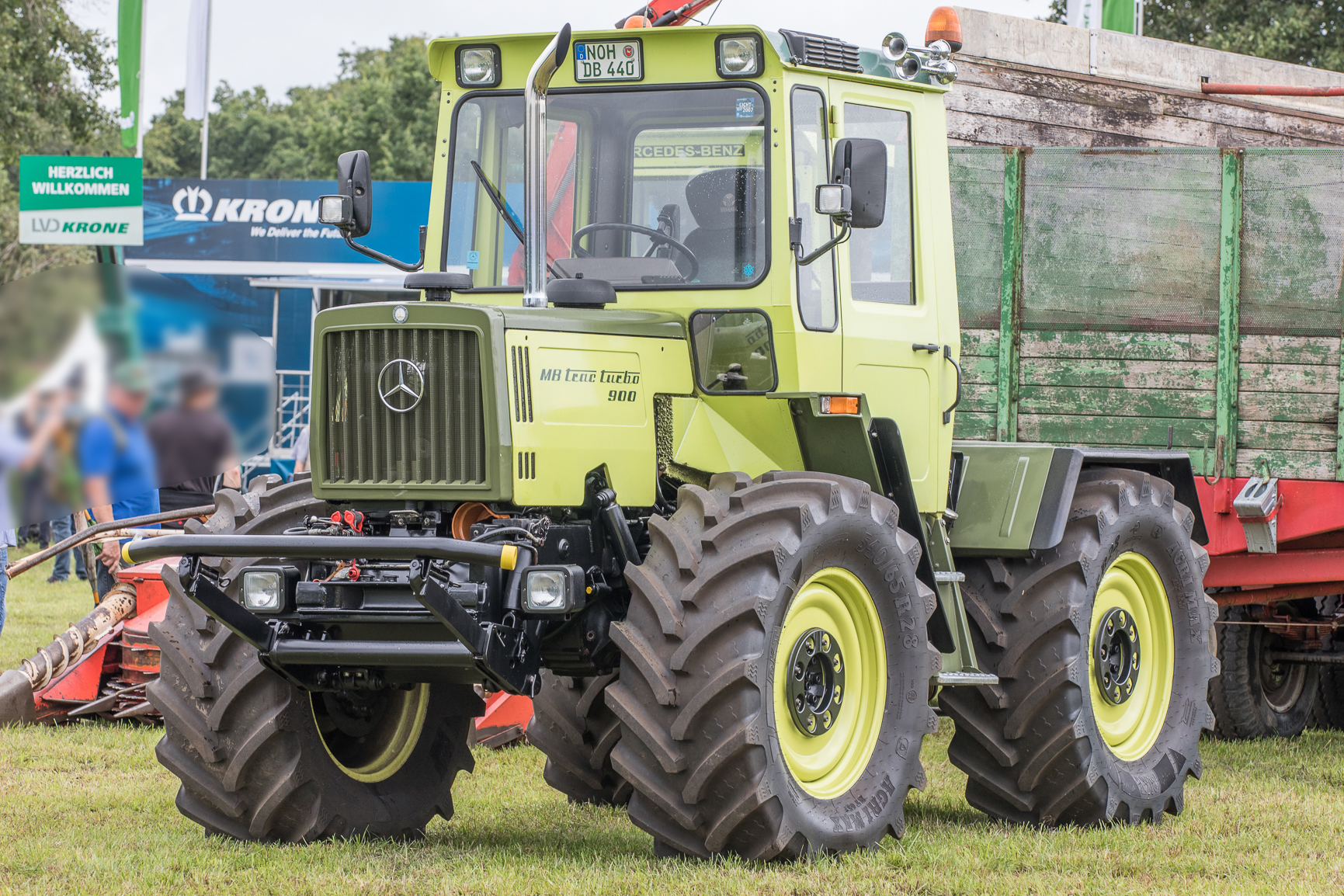
MB-trac turbo 900

In total, four type series (440, 441, 442, and 443) and twenty-one different series-production types of MB-trac were made, with either ten or sixteen models, depending on whether the Turbo-designated models are considered separate from the non-Turbo-designated models. The naming scheme of the MB-trac is mostly homogeneous, with MB trac followed by a number roughly indicative of the engine's DIN-PS power output times ten. Models equipped with a turbocharger have a turbo suffix in their model name, and models with an additional intercooler have an intercooler suffix instead. The exceptions to this naming scheme are the MB-trac 65/70, which has a power-output figure indicative of the DIN-PS/SAE-hp power output, MB-trac 900, MB-trac 1300 and MB-trac 1500, which have no turbo suffix despite being turbocharged, and the MB-trac turbo 900, which has a turbo prefix rather than a suffix. The MB-trac name is spelled MB-trac in technical documents, but MB trac on the tractors' bonnets.

=== Model overview ===
==== Light-duty (440 series) ====
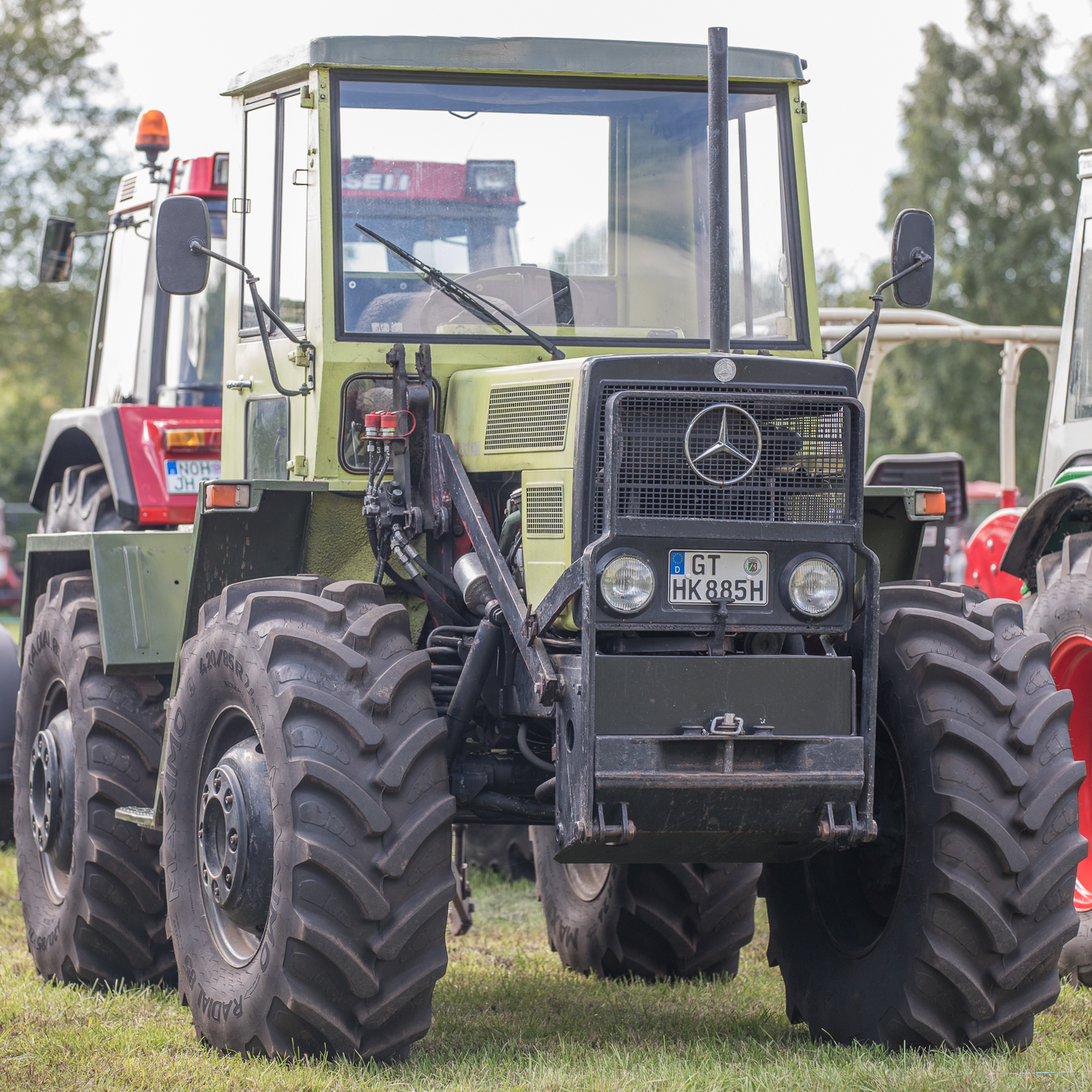
Light-duty 440-series before model change 1982
MB-trac 800 (440.163) 1975–1982

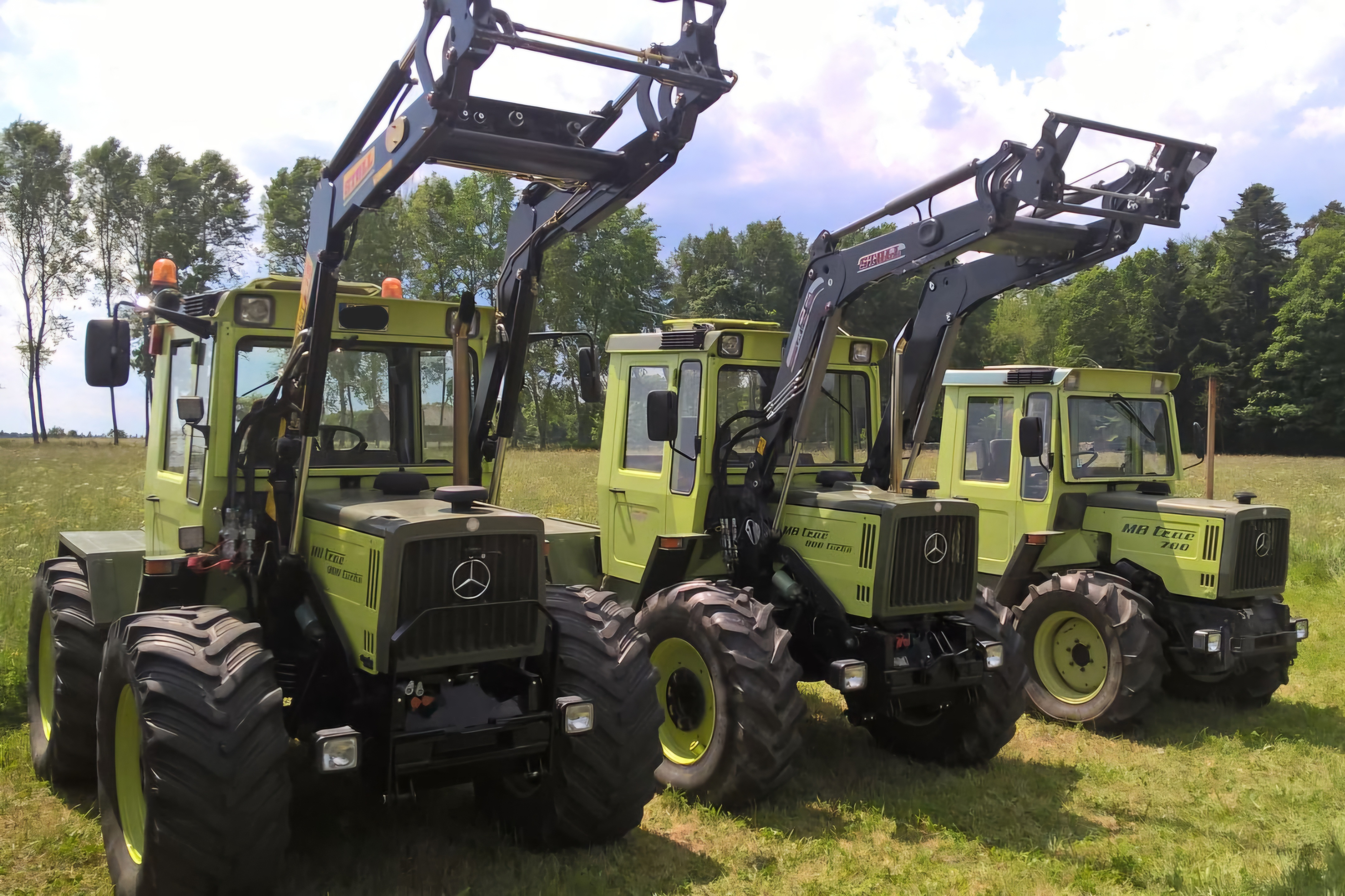
Light-duty 440-series after model change 1982
MB-trac turbo 900 (440.169) 1982–1987
MB-trac 900 turbo (440.173) 1987–1991
MB-trac 700 (440.167) 1982–1987

| Model | Type designation | Engine type | Displacement dm³ | Rated power in kW (PS) at min^{−1} | Torque N·m at min^{−1} | Production | Number built |
|---|---|---|---|---|---|---|---|
| MB-trac 65/70 | 440.161 | OM 314 | 3.784 | 48 (65) 2,400 | 216 1600 | 1973–1975 | 2.714 |
| MB-trac 700 | 440.162 | OM 314 | 3.784 | 48 (65) 2,400 | 216 1600 | 1976–1982 | 1.364 |
| MB-trac 700 | 440.167 | OM 314.LIII | 3.784 | 48 (65) 2,400 | 226 1400 | 1982–1987 | 1.569 |
| MB-trac 700 | 440.171 | OM 364.V | 3.972 | 50 (68) 2,400 | 235 1800–1900 | 1987–1991 | 899 |
| MB-trac 800 | 440.163 | OM 314 | 3.784 | 53 (72); 2.550 from 06/79: 55 (75); 2.600 | 221 1600 | 1975–1982 | 8.717 |
| MB-trac 800 | 440.168 | OM 314.LII | 3.784 | 55 (75) 2,600 | 245 1600 | 1982–1987 | 1.990 |
| MB-trac 800 | 440.172 | OM 364 | 3.972 | 57 (78) 2,400 | 263 1500–1800 | 1987–1991 | 835 |
| MB-trac 900 | 440.164 | OM 314A | 3.784 | 63 (85) 2,400 | 294 1600 | 1981–1982 | 1.090 |
| MB-trac turbo 900 | 440.169 | OM 314A | 3.784 | 63 (85) 2,400 | 294 1600 | 1982–1987 | 3.277 |
| MB-trac 900 turbo | 440.173 | OM 364A.II/1 | 3.972 | 66 (90) 2,400 | 313 1400–1800 | 1987–1991 | 2.148 |

==== Medium-duty (441 series) ====
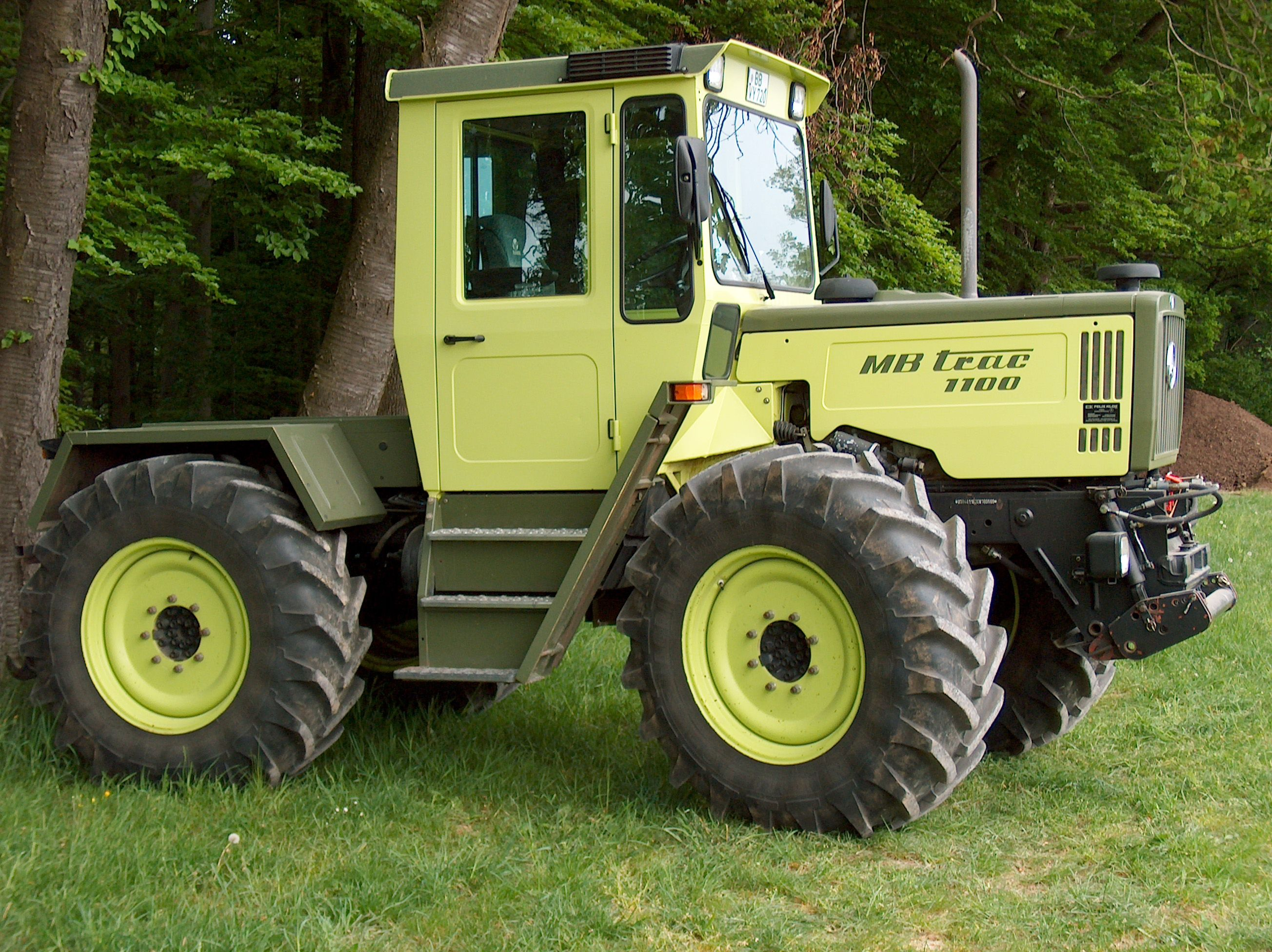
Medium-duty 441-series
MB-trac 1100 (441.163) 1987–1991

| Model | Type designation | Engine type | Displacement dm³ | Rated power in kW (PS) at min^{−1} | Torque N·m at min^{−1} | Production | Number built |
|---|---|---|---|---|---|---|---|
| MB-trac 1000 | 441.161 | OM 352 | 5.675 | 70 (95) 2,400 | 324 1700 | 1982–1987 | 4.346 |
| MB-trac 1000 | 441.162 | OM 366.XV | 5.958 | 74 (100) 2,400 | 350 1500–1800 | 1987–1991 | 2.613 |
| MB-trac 1100 | 441.163 | OM 366 | 5.958 | 81 (110) 2,400 | 375 1500–1800 | 1987–1991 | 1.283 |

==== Heavy-duty (442 and 443 series) ====
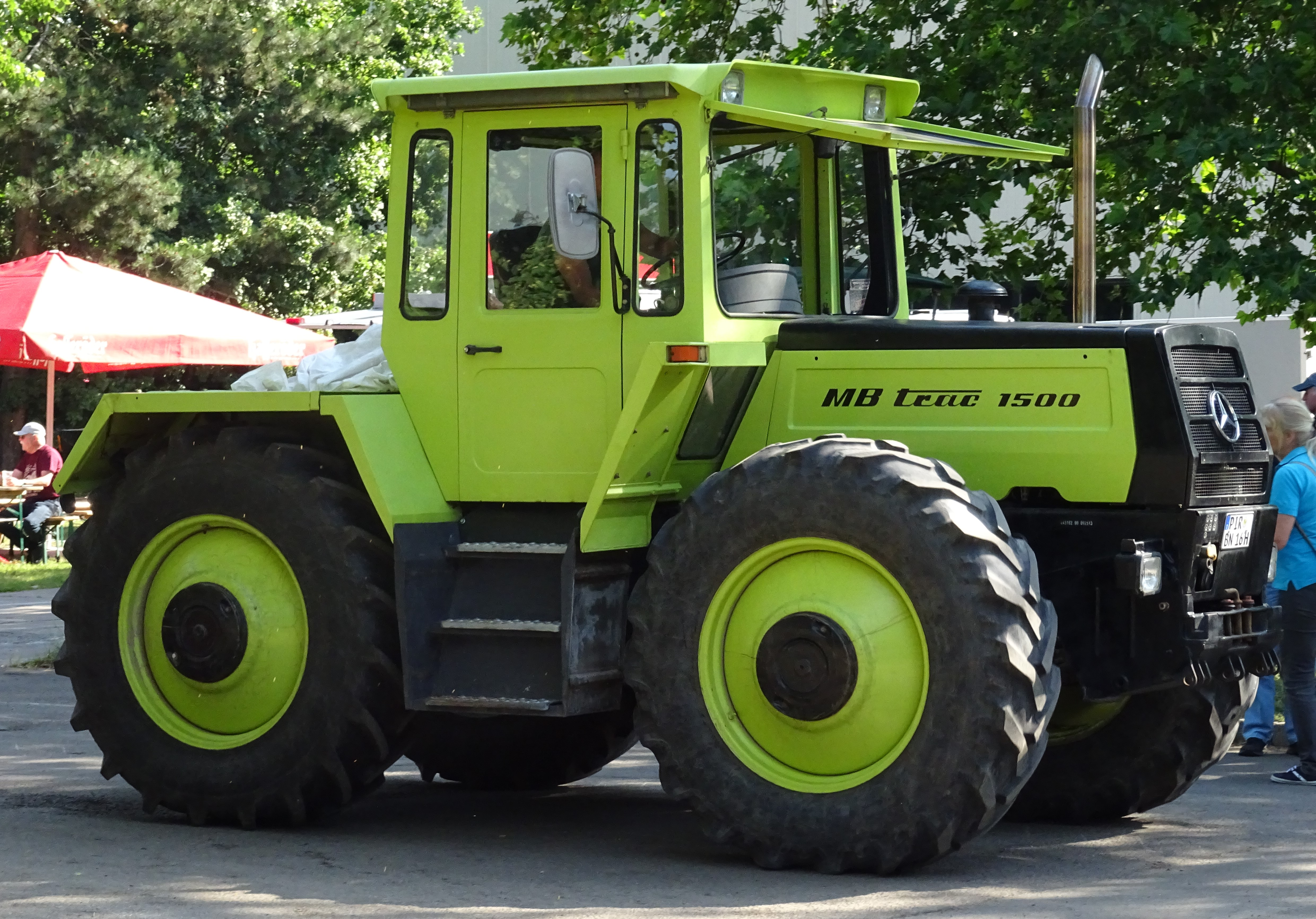
Heavy-duty 443-series in old color before 1984
MB-trac 1500 (443.162) 1980–1987

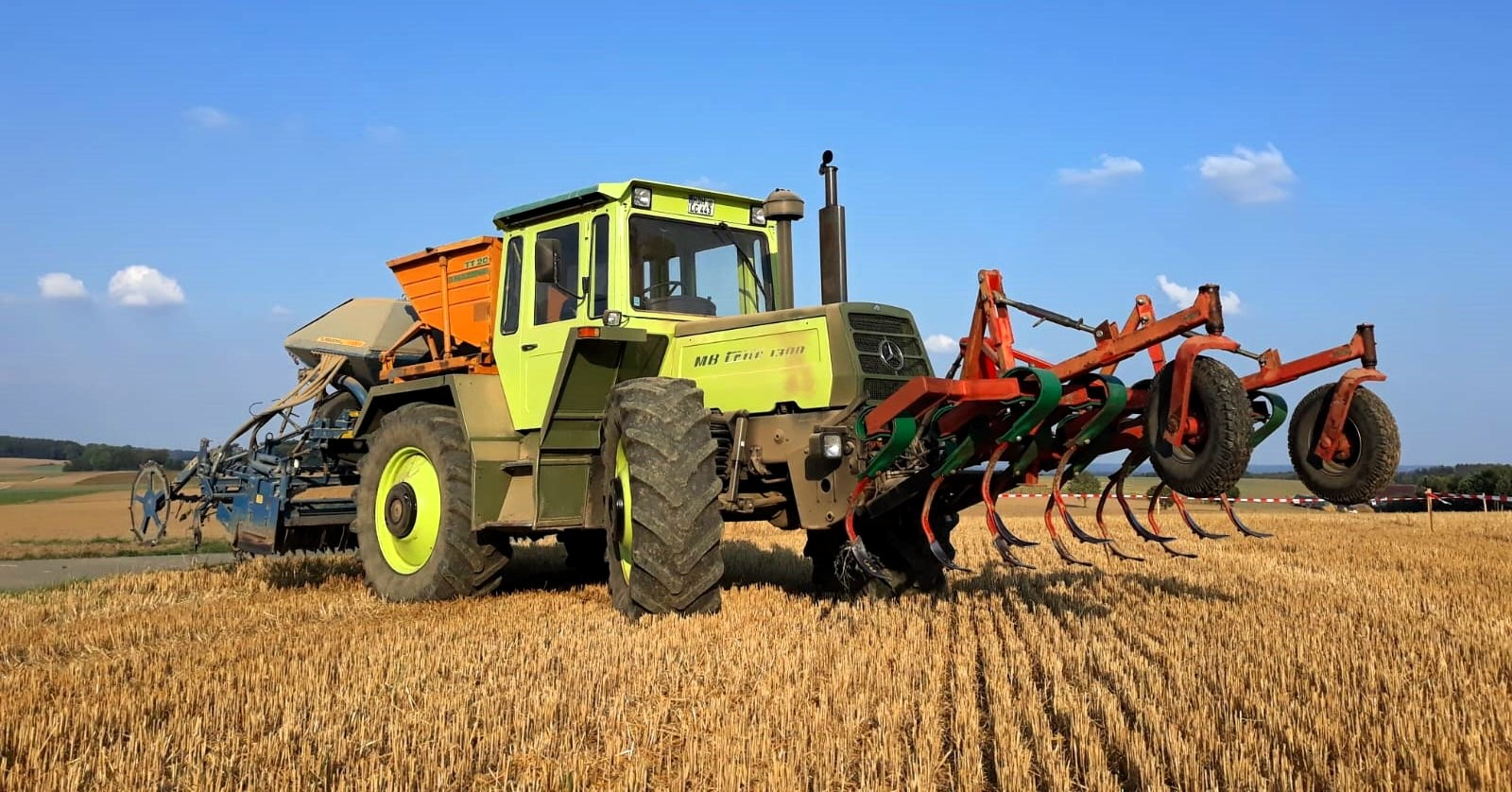
Heavy-duty 443-series in new color since 1984
MB-trac 1300 (443.161) 1976–1987

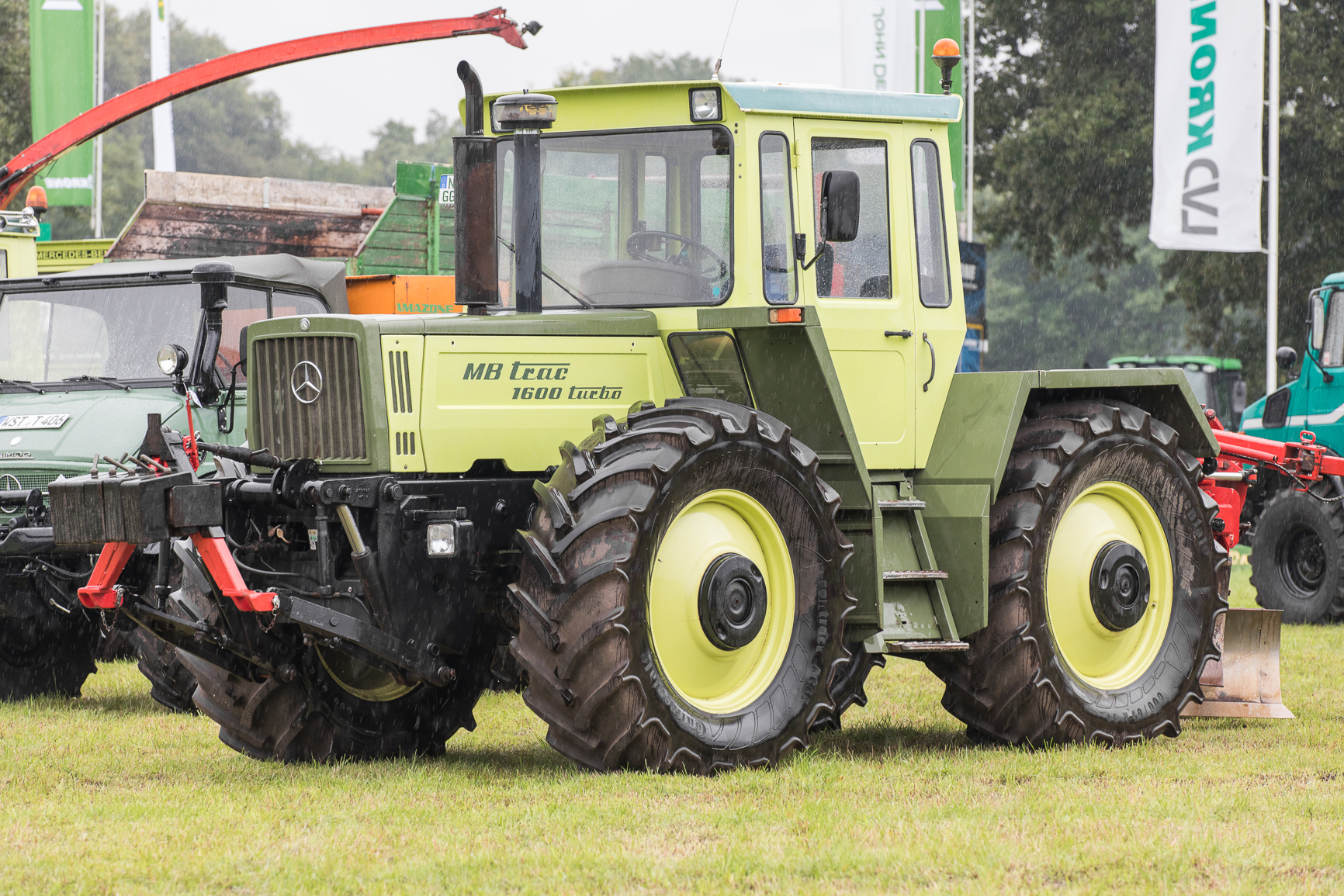
Heavy-duty 443-series after model change 1987
MB-trac 1600 turbo (443.166) 1987–1991

| Model | Type designation | Engine type | Displacement dm³ | Rated power in kW (PS) at min^{−1} | Torque N·m at min^{−1} | Production | Number built |
|---|---|---|---|---|---|---|---|
| MB-trac 1100 | 442.161 | OM 352.XIX | 5.675 | 81 (110) 2,600 | 364 1,800 | 1976–1984 | 551 |
| MB-trac 1100 | 443.160 | OM 352.XIX | 5.675 | 81 (110) 2,600 | 364 1,800 | 1984–1987 | 72 |
| MB-trac 1300 | 443.161 | OM 352.XIX | 5.675 | 92 (125) 2,500 | 412 1,700 | 1976–1987 | 2.908 |
| MB-trac 1500 | 443.162 | OM 352A.LIII/3 | 5.675 | 110 (150) 2,500 | from 03/82: 510 1500 | 1980–1987 | 2,855 |
| MB-trac 1300 turbo | 443.163 | OM 366A.IV/1 | 5.958 | 92 (125) 2,400 | 425 1,600–1,800 | 1987–1991 | 474 |
| MB-trac 1400 turbo | 443.164 | OM 366A.V/1 | 5.958 | 100 (136) 2,400 | 470 1600–1800 | 1987–1991 | 398 |
| MB-trac 1600 turbo | 443.166 | OM 366A.VI/1 | 5.958 | 115 (156) 2,400 | 530 1600–1800 | 1987–1991 | 1,072 |
| MB-trac 1800 intercooler | 443.166 | OM 366LA | 5.958 | 132 (180) 2,400 | 645 1600–1800 | 1990–1991 | 190 |

== History ==
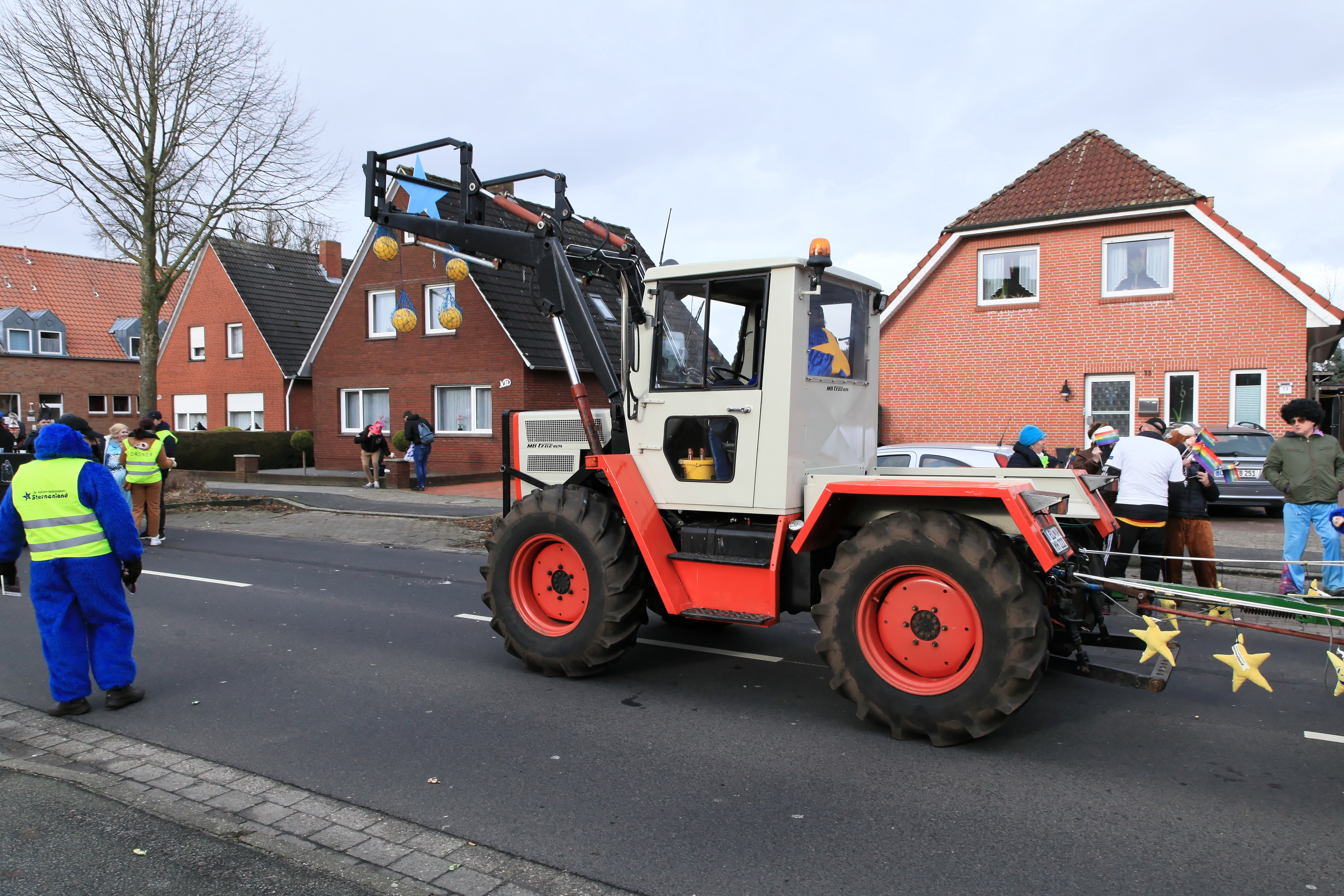
MB-trac 65/70 (440.161)

Former Daimler-Benz had been making the Unimog, a tractor-like implement carrier vehicle, since 1951. Mercedes-Benz customers however sought a dedicated agricultural and silvicultural tractor. Thus, Daimler-Benz, on 25 March 1968 issued a development order for an agricultural tractor that would share various components with the Unimog 403. Throughout the development phase, various prototypes were built; these were designated the AM 60. During the development phase, a 150 PS (110 kW) version with a rotating steering-column and driver seat was considered, but originally not put forward.

Eventually, the 440 series MB-trac was presented at the 1972 DLG fair as the MB-trac 65/70. Series production started on 1 July 1973 at the Mercedes-Benz Gaggenau plant, alongside the Unimog. Until 31 December 1973, 520 units of the MB-trac were produced. The original colour was pebble-grey with red wheels. In March 1976, the heavy-duty 442 and 443 series MB-trac production commenced, which shares various components with the Unimog 425.

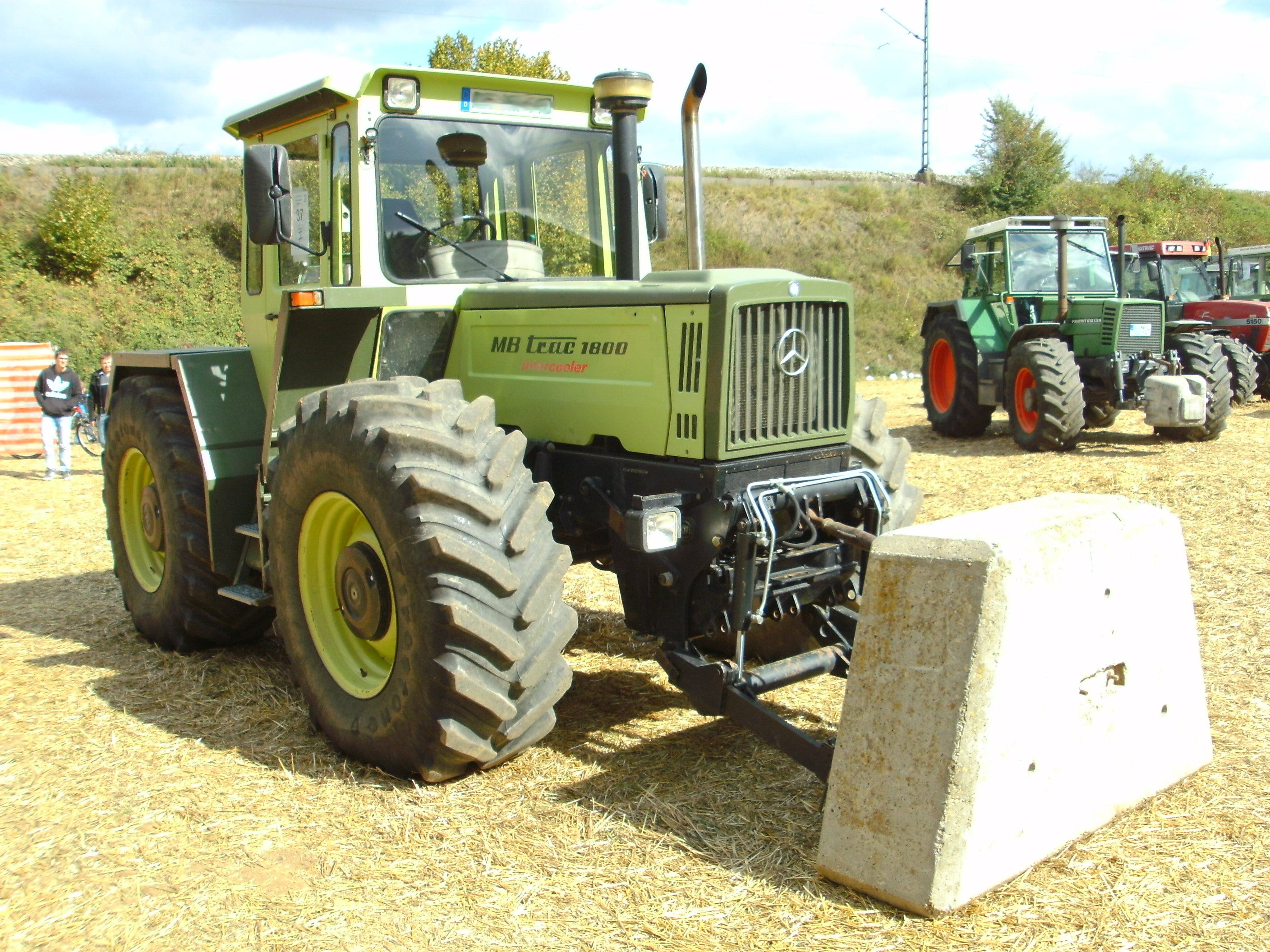
MB-trac 1800 intercooler (443.166)

In 1987, Daimler-Benz entered into a strategic cooperation with Deutz, who at the time built the Deutz INTRAC, a similar trac-like tractor. Joint development was carried out by Daimler-Benz (40 %) and Deutz (60 %) owned Trac-Technik-Entwicklungsgesellschaft (TTE) throughout the late 1980s, however, due to cost concerns, development was cancelled, and it was decided at Daimler-Benz to cancel the MB-trac as a result.

In 1990, the MB-trac lineup saw its last and most powerful addition, the MB-trac 1800 intercooler. It was based on a 1600 turbo, but had an additional intercooler installed. Production ended on December 17th 1991.

=== Production numbers ===
View source data.

== Technical description ==
The MB-trac comprises four different series which have distinct technical differences. The following description thus only gives a basic overview of the MB-trac.

In general, the MB-trac is a trac type of agricultural tractor which is characterised by four same-size wheels, a frame undercarriage for the engine and front axle, and steerable wheels rather than articulated steering. The cab is installed in the center of the vehicle. This design allows the MB-trac to mount implements in front, on the rear axle behind the cab, and behind the rear axle.

Despite sharing its drivetrain with the Unimog 403 or Unimog 425, the MB-trac is not a modified Unimog. It is distinctly different and much more suited for agricultural use, for example, due to its larger wheels. Unusual for an agricultural tractor, the MB-trac's front axle is coil sprung, which improves its on-road handling characteristics.

Light-duty MB-trac models were equipped with the Mercedes-Benz OM 314 or Mercedes-Benz OM 364 four-cylinder Diesel engines and use a gearbox with 16 forward and 8 reverse gears. The gears are shifted using a conventional H-shift lever which is fitted with a splitter device. A separate gear lever is used to engage forward or reverse, and the same lever is also used to shift into a high-speed forward range, which does not exist in reverse. Medium-duty models are technically similar to the light-duty models but feature the Mercedes-Benz OM 352 or OM 366 six-cylinder engines. The heavy-duty MB-trac models were equipped with the Mercedes-Benz OM 352 or Mercedes-Benz OM 366 six-cylinder Diesel engines, and have a dedicated reverse-drive feature with a reversible cab and gearbox.

== Bibliography ==
- Wener Schmeing, Hans-Jürgen Wischof: Traktoren der Daimler AG – Unbekannte Einblicke in Technik und Wirtschaft: vom Unimog zum MB-trac und warum es keinen Nachfolger gab, Vol. 2, DLG-Verlag, DLG-Verlag, 2011, ISBN 9783769007343
- Ward, Rod (2019). Mercedes-Benz Part Three: Unimog & MB-Trac. Auto Review series, no. 149. Leeds, UK: Zeteo Publishing. OCLC 1137103185.
