= Iveco Bus =

Bus manufacturer, with headquarters in Lyon, France

- Formerly: Irisbus (1999–2013)
- Type: Division
- Founded: 1999; 27 years ago
- Headquarters: Turin, Italy
- Key people: Claudio Passerini (president)
- Products: Buses; Coaches; Minibuses
- Revenue: €2,948 million (2025)
- Number of employees: 6,556 (2025)
- Parent: Iveco Group
- Website: www.ivecobus.com/worldwide

Iveco Bus (formerly known as Irisbus) is a bus manufacturer with headquarters in Turin, and a division of Iveco; a company incorporated under Dutch law and listed on Borsa Italiana.

== History ==
=== Iveco (1975–1999) ===
In 1975 Fiat Bus created the brand Iveco (Industrial Vehicle Corporation) which gradually took over operations of Officine Meccaniche (OM) and Orlandi in Italy, Berliet, Renault, Chausson, and Saviem in France, Karosa in the Czech Republic, Magirus-Deutz in Germany, and Pegaso in Spain. With the integration of Renault Bus in 1999, Iveco Bus became Irisbus.

=== Irisbus (1999–2013) ===
The French-Italian company was created in January 1999 by way of merger between the coach and bus divisions of Renault Véhicules Industriels and the coach and bus divisions of Fiat Industrial and Iveco, with Ikarus Bus added in late 1999. The Ikarus Bus division was sold off in 2006 to Hungary's Műszertechnika Group, acquiring the property of Heuliez and Karosa which became Iveco Czech Republic in 2007.

From 2003 to 2010, Irisbus was 100%-owned by Fiat Group's IVECO, and the company was named Irisbus Iveco. On 14 September 2011, Fiat Industrial announced the closing of the Italian plant in Flumeri, Campania due to a drastic reduction in production, preparing the relocation of the activities to Annonay, France. Since 2013, Irisbus has been 100% owned by CNH Industrial's Iveco division.

=== Iveco Bus (since 2013) ===
The Irisbus name was retired, and the division is a branch of Iveco, rebranded as Iveco Bus in May 2013, after a reorganization plan. All new buses are now sold under the IVECO brand, as are all the other commercial road vehicles produced by the group.

The company is based in Turin with offices in Lyon, Watford, and Mainz. Buses are developed in one of two Research and Development centres, one in Italy and one in Switzerland. The engines which power Iveco buses were developed in Italy by Fiat Powertrain Technologies.

On 25 February 2020, Iveco and Otokar sign an agreement for the joint production of buses at the Sakarya plant in Turkey to be sold in Europe, the Middle East and Africa. Born from this agreement was the Iveco Bus Streetway presented in September 2021, based on the Urbanway chassis and with Iveco Cursor 9 engines. This model complements the Urbanway without replacing it.

In March 2022, the 150,000th bus was produced at the Vysoké Mýto plant.

On 18 April 2023, the new area in the Foggia plant (formerly Sofim) was inaugurated for the assembly of coaches and buses. The investment for setting up the production line amounts to around 40 million euros and benefits from the funds made available by the Next Generation EU package. The plant has a production capacity of 1000 buses per year. The first models to be assembled and finished will be the E-Way and Crossway buses.

== Production ==
Iveco Bus has seven main manufacturing sites in Europe and Latin America:

Location	Country	Products and operations
Vysoké Mýto	Czech Republic	Crossway buses and Evadys coaches. The factory is operated by Iveco Czech Republic (formerly Karosa) and is Iveco Bus's largest production plant.
Annonay	France	Urbanway and Crealis city buses, electric and hydrogen models, and battery assembly.
Rorthais	France	Heuliez GX ELEC and Iveco E-Way electric city buses.
Brescia	Italy	Daily minibus bodywork and customisation.
Foggia	Italy	Final assembly and finishing of buses partly built at other group plants.
Sete Lagoas	Brazil	Bus chassis for Latin America.
Córdoba	Argentina	Bus chassis, including the natural-gas-powered BUS 17-210 G.

In Italy, Daily minibuses are built in Suzzara, then fitted out and customised in Brescia.

Otokar also builds standard-floor Crossway buses and the Streetway range for Iveco Bus at its factory in Sakarya, Turkey.

== Models ==
=== Current ===
Urban

- Crealis Neo
- E-Way
- Crossway LE City
- Streetway
- Metro (Australian market)
- Urbanway

Intercity

- Afriway (African market)
- Crossway
- Crossway LE

Coach

- Evadys
- Magelys

Minibus

- EcoDaily

=== Discontinued ===
Buses

- 315 (1978–2001)
- 316 (1978–2000)
- 370 (1976–2001)
- Agora (1999–2006)
- Ares (1999–2006)
- Arway (2006–2013)
- Axer (2001–2007)
- Citelis (2005–2013)
- CityClass (1996–2008)
- DownTown (1998–2000)
- Effeuno (1984–1990)
- EuroClass (1999–2007)
- Hynovis (2008–2012)
- Midys (2004–2008)
- MyWay (1999–2007)
- Récréo (1996–2007)
- TurboCity (1989–1996)
- TurboCity R (1992–1998)

Coaches

- Domino (1998–2011)
- Evadys (2005–2013)
- EuroRider (1997-?)
- Flipper (2006-?)
- Iliade (1997–2006)
- Midway (2004–2013)
- Proxys (2005–2013)

Minibuses

- 316 (1978–2000)
- Europolis (1999–2010)
- Midirider (?-?)
- Proway (2005–2013)

Trolleybuses

- Agora (1999–2006)
- Civis (2004–2010)
- Cristalis (2004–2011)

== Gallery ==
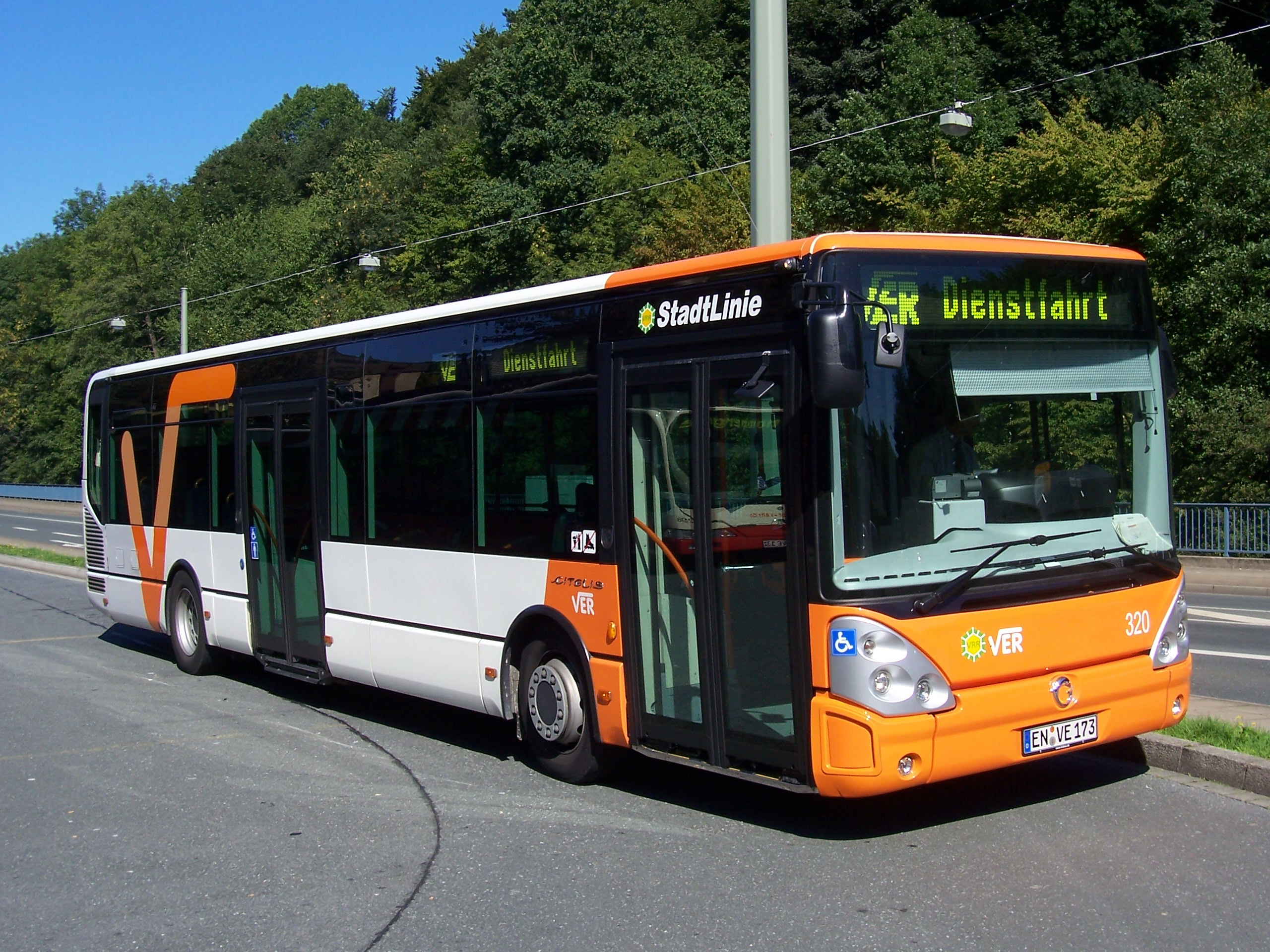
Irisbus Citelis

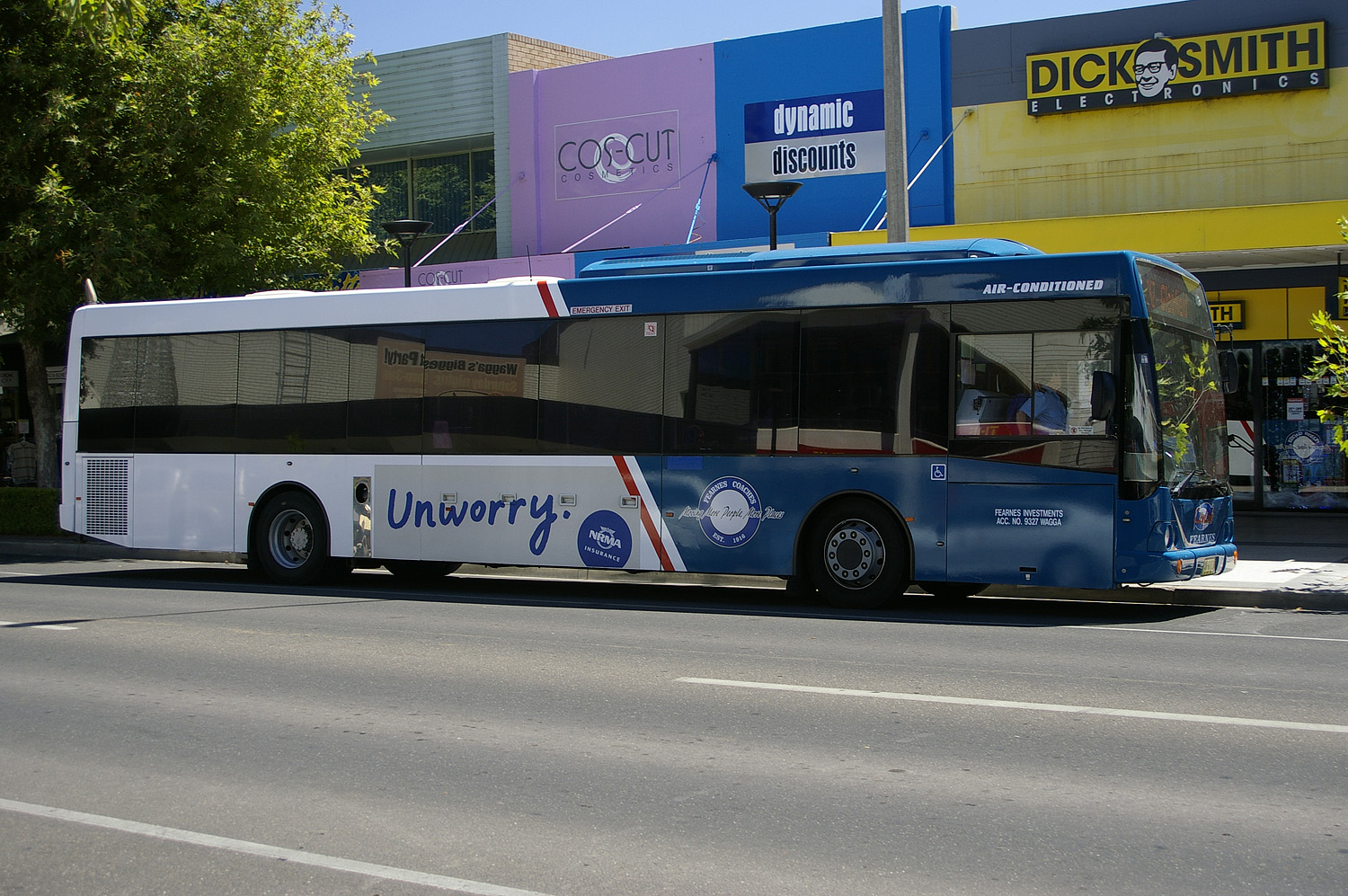
Irisbus Agoraline with ABM CB60 body in Wagga Wagga, Australia

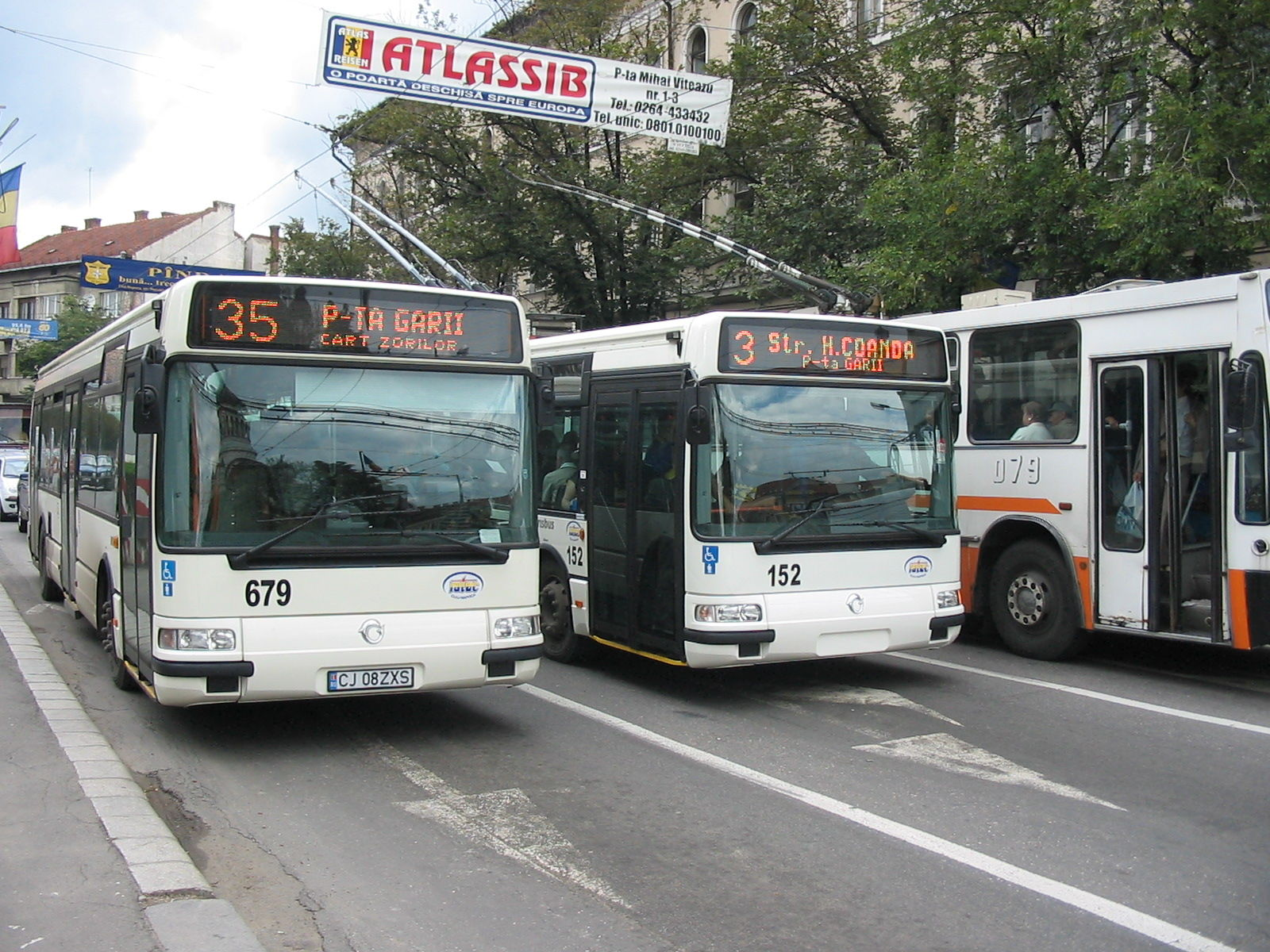
Irisbus Agora bus and trolleybus in Cluj-Napoca, Romania

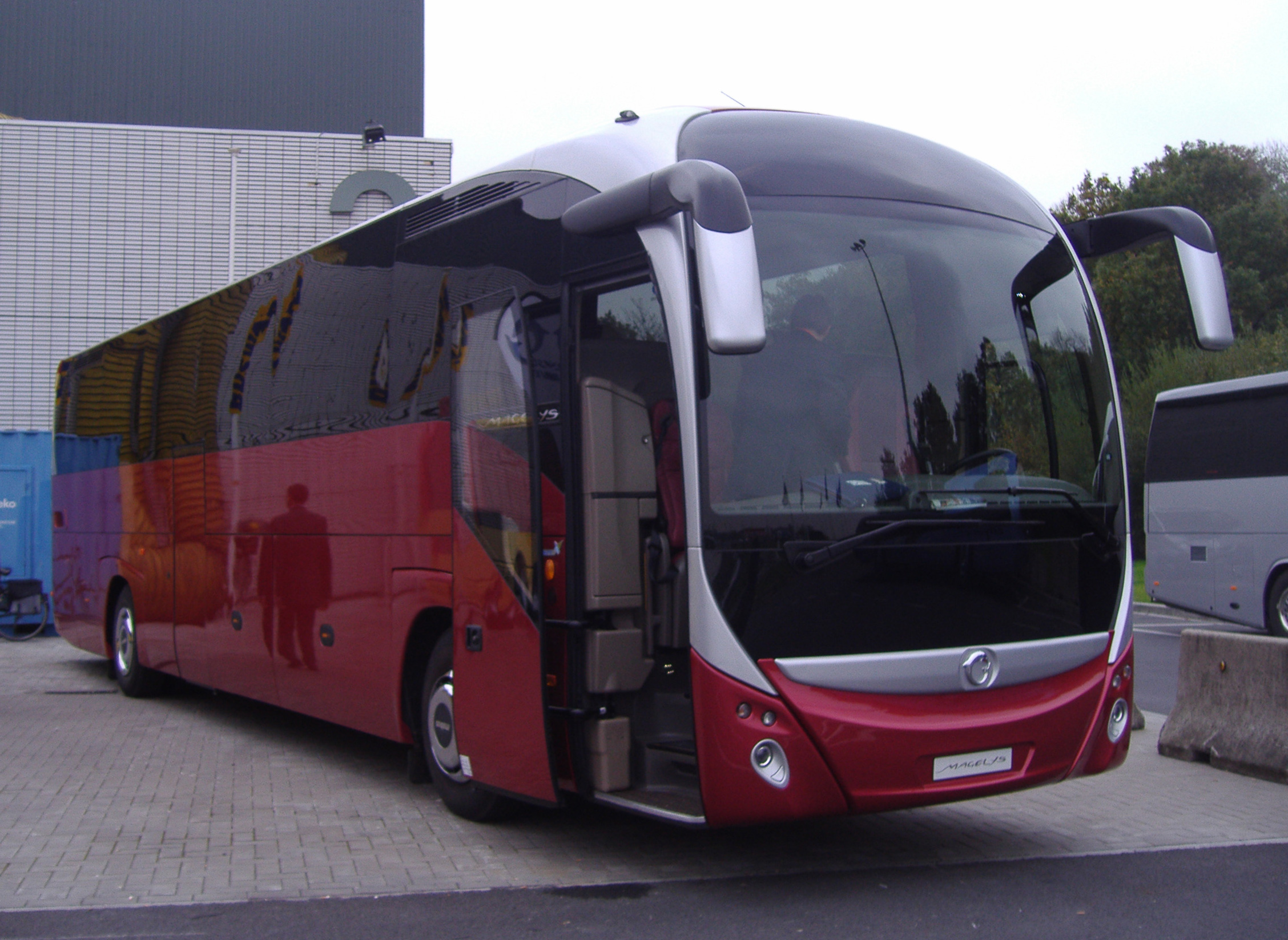
Irisbus Magelys at the Busworld 2007 exhibition in Kortrijk, Belgium

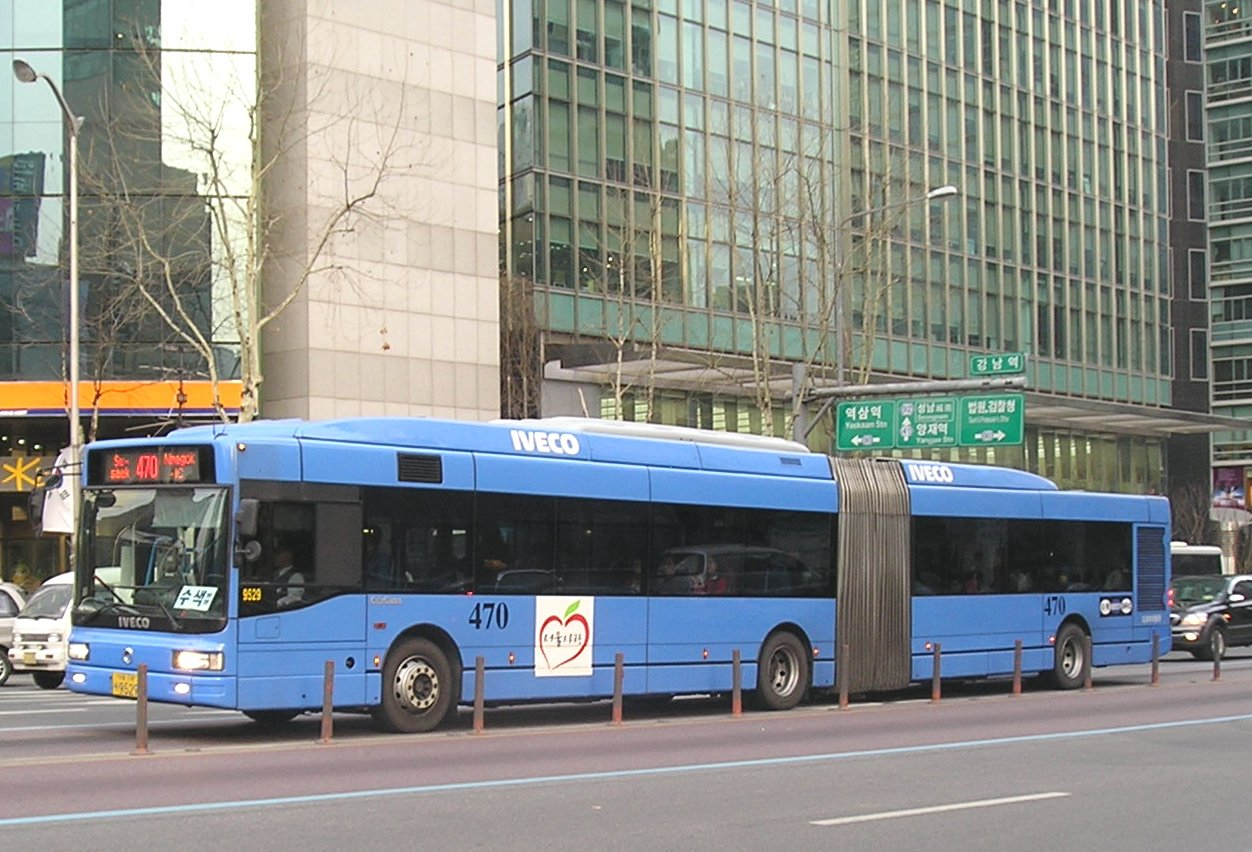
Iveco CityClass 18 m in Seoul, South Korea

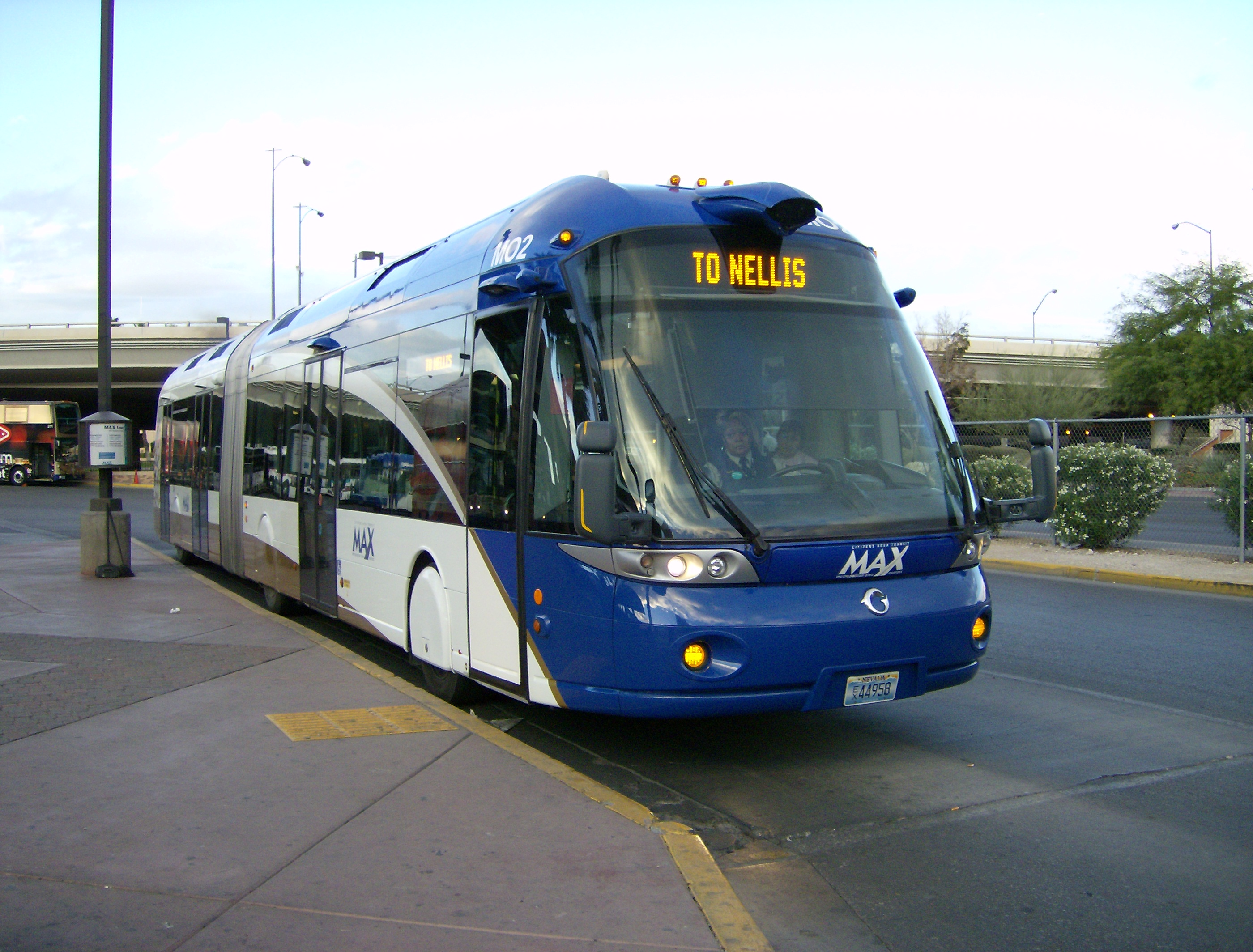
Las Vegas CAT Irisbus Civis

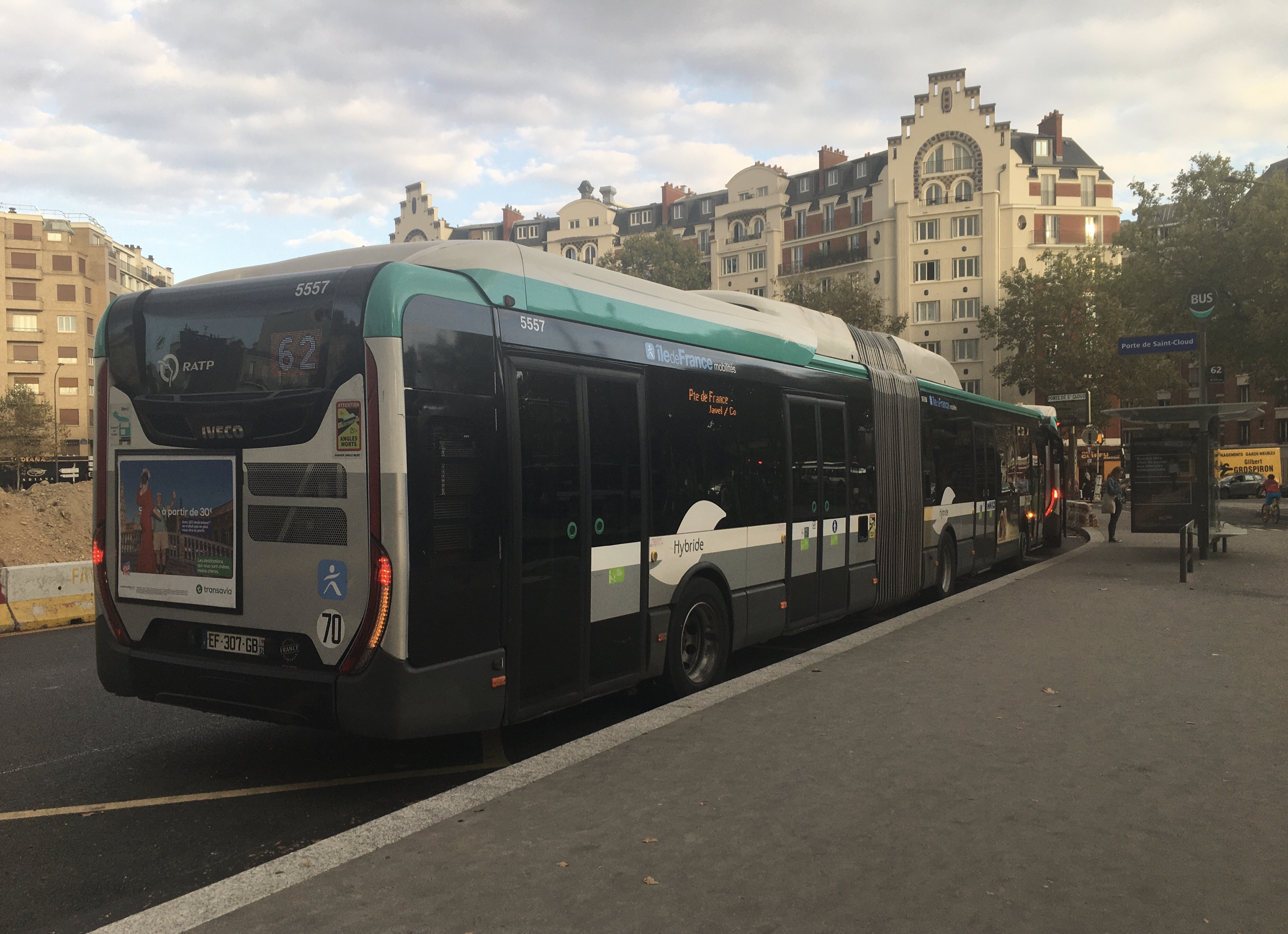
Iveco Bus Urbanway 18 Hybride n°5557 of the Line 62 at its terminus Porte de Saint-Cloud, Paris

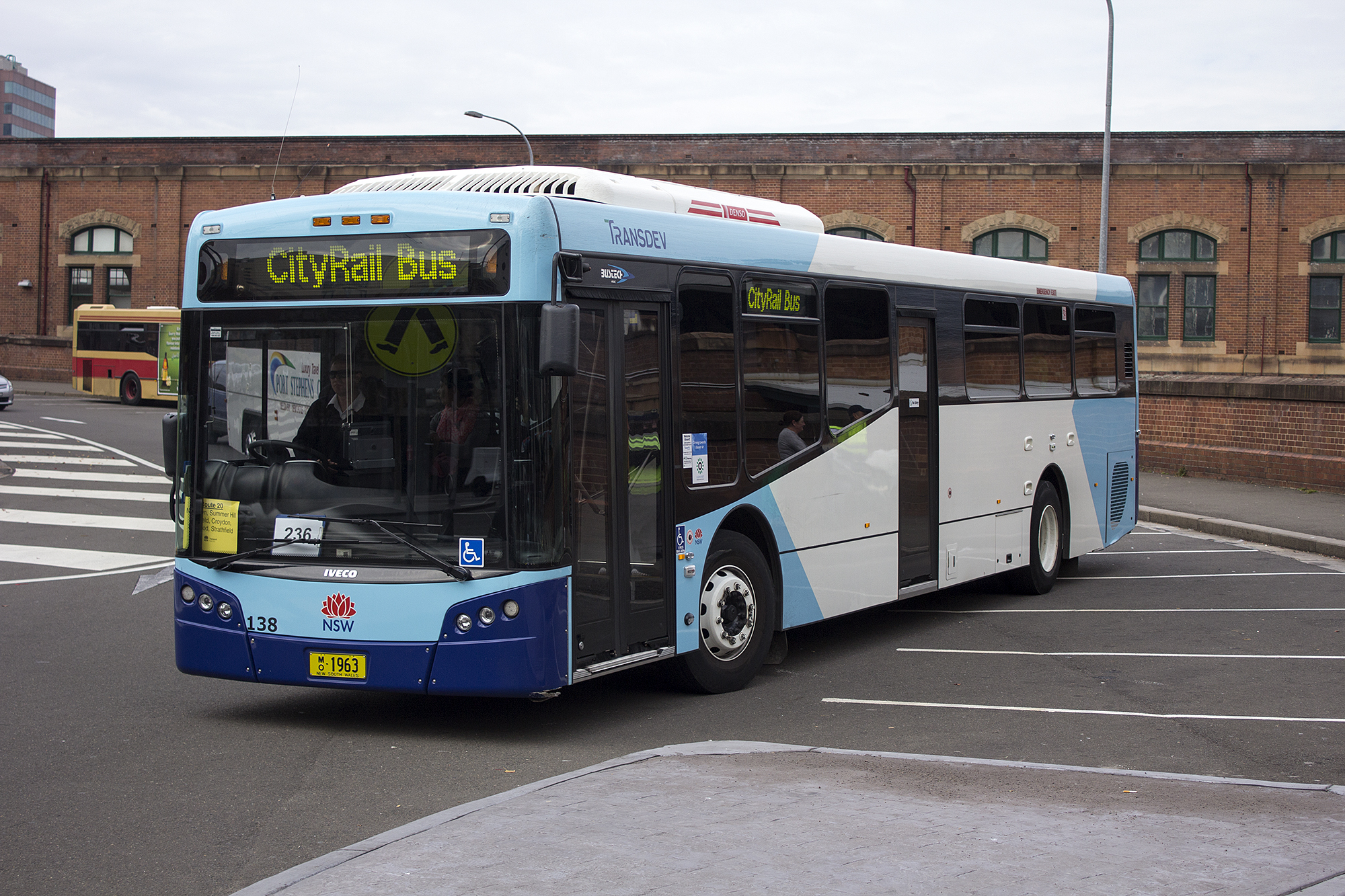
Iveco Metro bus operated by Transdev Shorelink in Sydney, Australia

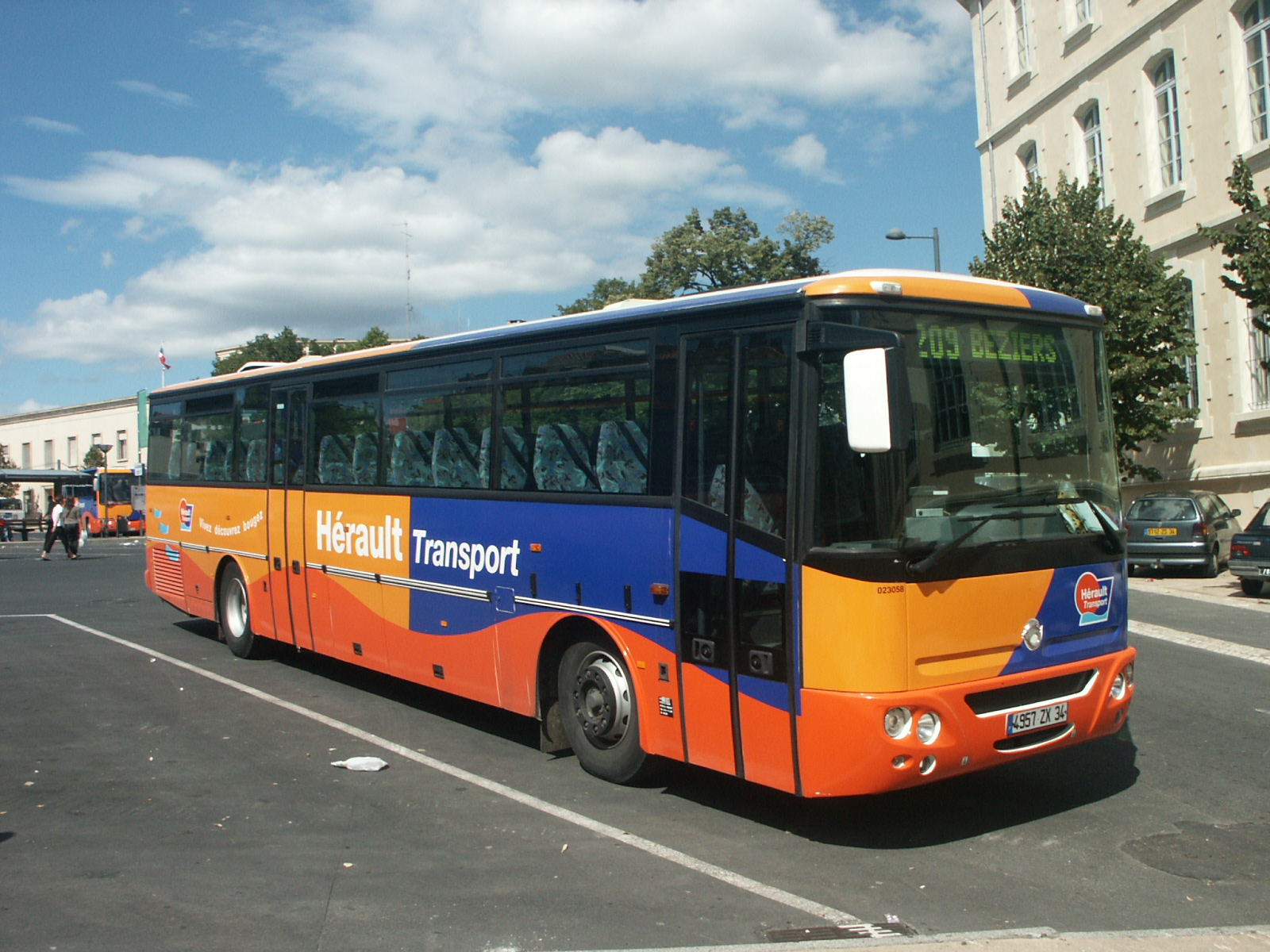
Iribus Axer with Hérault Transport

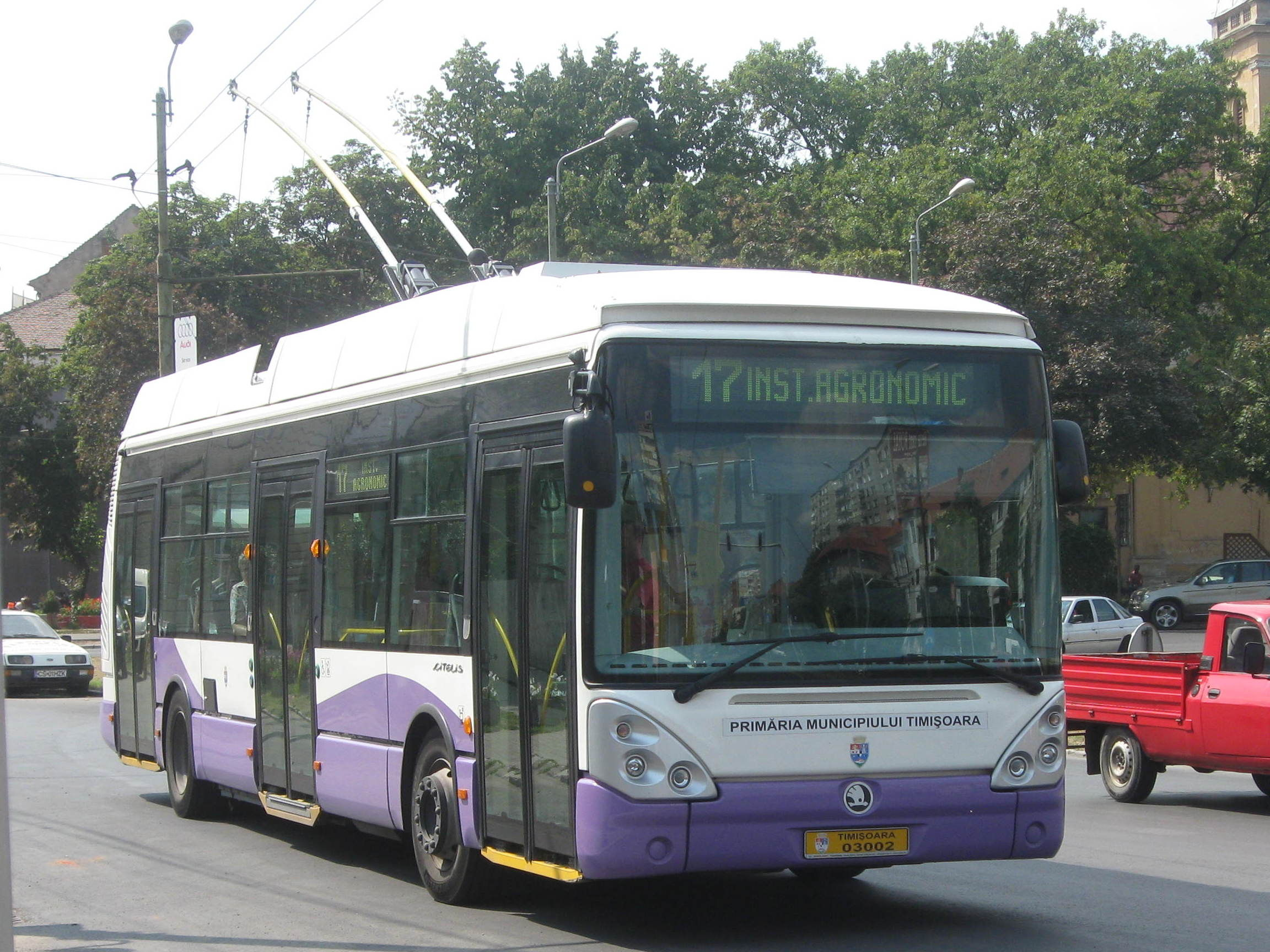
Škoda 24Tr Irisbus citelis in Timișoara, Romania

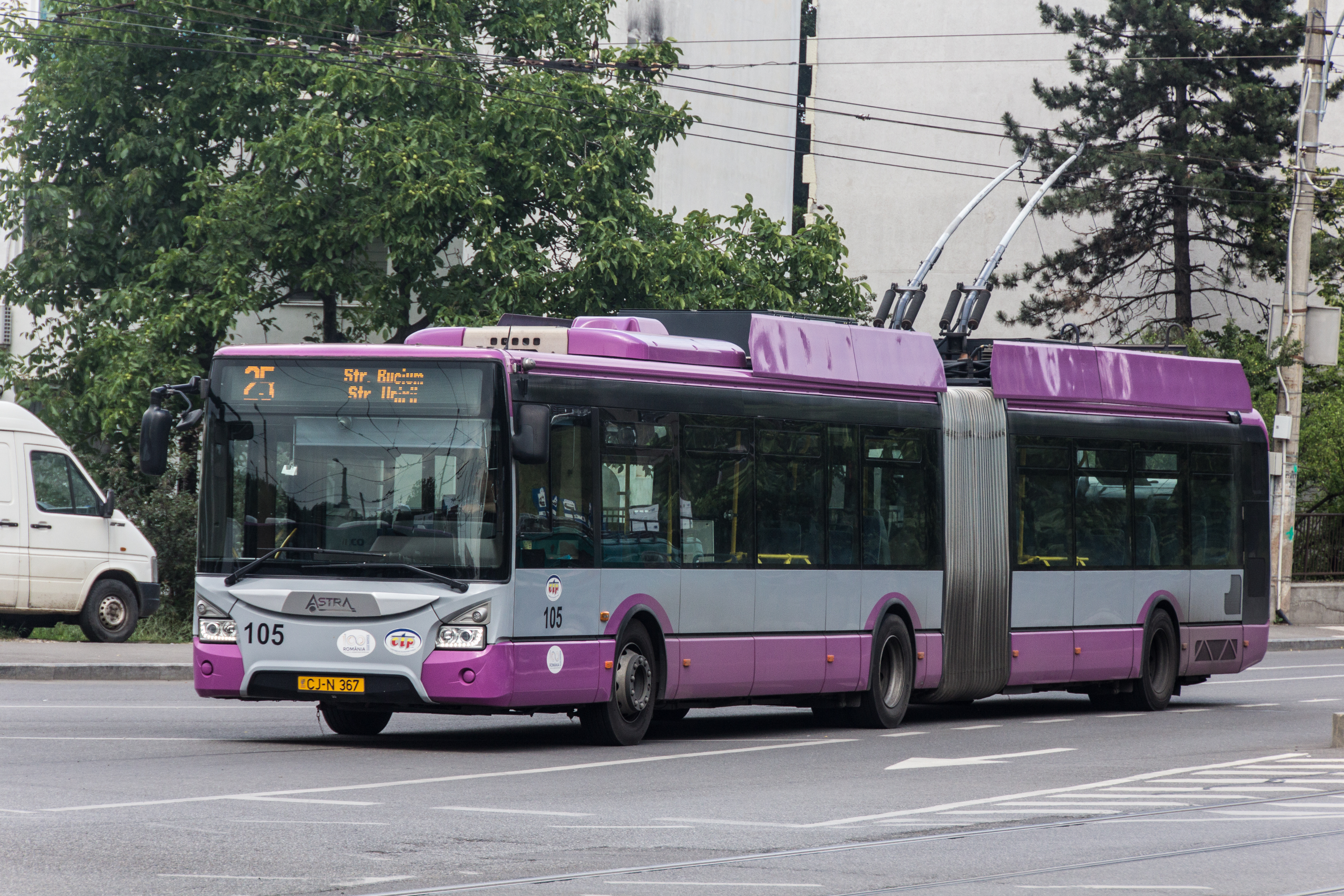
Iveco Astra Town 118 in Cluj, Romania

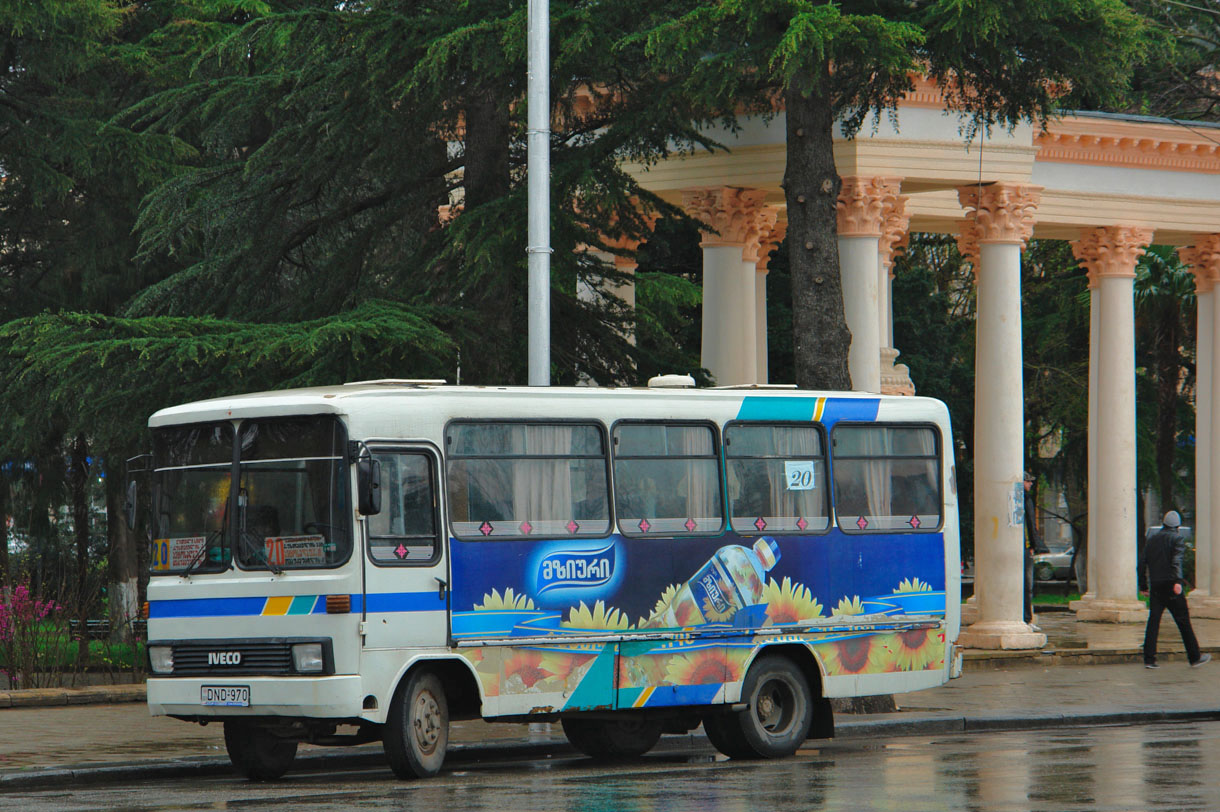
Zastava bodied Iveco-Otoyol M23 Minibus in Georgia, 2011

== See also ==
- List of buses
