= Iveco TurboCity =

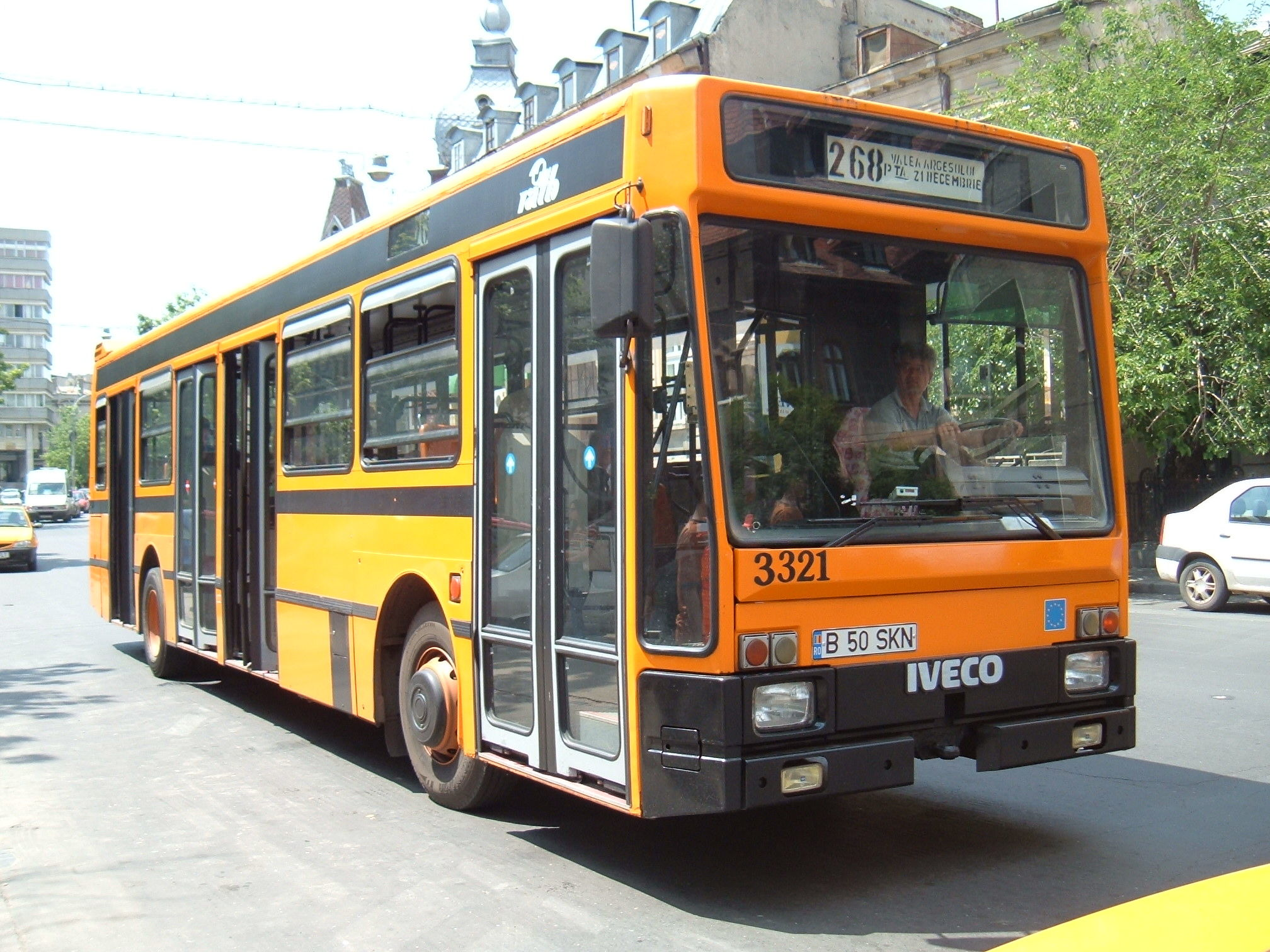
- An Iveco 480 TurboCity in Bucharest

Overview
- Manufacturer: Iveco-Fiat

Body and chassis
- Doors: 2-4
- Floor type: step entrance, 0.735 m (2.4 ft) floor height
- Chassis: semi-integral

Powertrain
- Engine: Diesel
- Capacity: 105 / 115 passengers
- Power output: 159 kW, 200 kW
- Transmission: ZF or Voith

Dimensions
- Wheelbase: 5.11 m (16.8 ft); 6.15 m (20.2 ft)
- Length: 9.5 m (31.2 ft); 10.7 m (35.1 ft); 12 m (39.4 ft); 17.8 m (58.4 ft)
- Width: 2.5 m (8.2 ft)

Chronology
- Predecessor: Iveco Effeuno
- Successor: Iveco CityClass

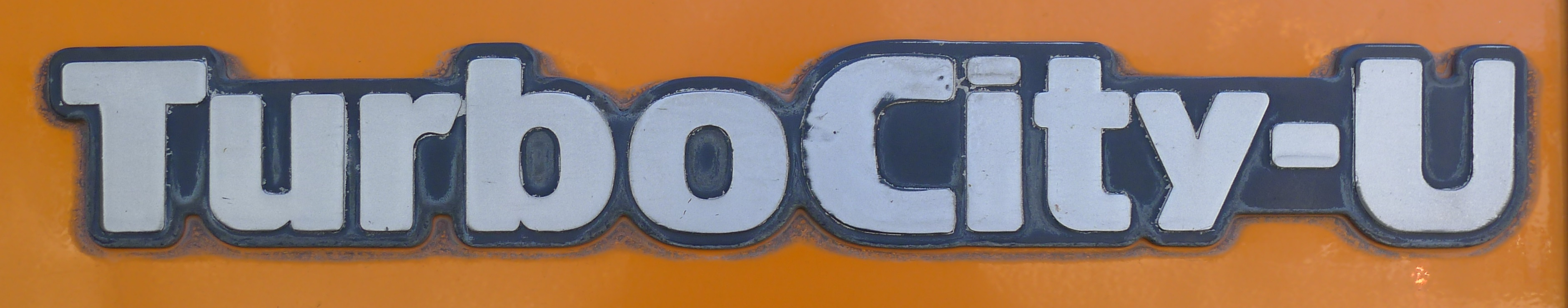
The badge of Iveco TurboCity

The Iveco TurboCity is a class of Italian single-decker buses built between 1989 and 1996 by Iveco. Replacing the Effeuno, they consisted of three variants with different internal arrangement: Iveco 480 for urban services, Iveco 580 for suburban services, and Iveco 680 for interurban services (in 12 m length only). There were chassis only models for the extensive Italian body-building industry available.

The buses were provided (depending from the sub-manufacturer chosen by the customer) with two different chassis length, 10.7 m and 12 m. There was also an articulated version (pusher) with a length of 17.8 m, as well as a trolleybus version with Ansaldo electric equipment.

The bus was in service with numerous public transport companies in Italy, Eastern Europe, Malaysia and Africa.

Iveco also attempted to sell the TurboCity in right-hand drive configuration in the United Kingdom. Two demonstrators with Alexander bodies, one of these being a double-decker bus, were built in 1990 and 1991 respectively, followed by a batch of six Wadham Stringer bodied TurboCities built as dealer stock. No orders followed for either the single or double-decker, and the single-decker Alexander prototype was eventually exported to Singapore for use as a driver trainer. The double-deck TurboCity sat unused at Blythswood Vehicles' Glasgow premises for 18 months before finding its first buyer, it then passed a number of small operators across England until a crash ended its career. Right-hand drive TurboCities, meanwhile, would sell better in Malaysia, with a number delivered to Kuala Lumpur for use by RapidKL.

The 480/580 type was assisted by the Iveco TurboCity-R class (TurboCity-UR 490/590) with a lower floor height of 550 mm.
