= Irisbus Midirider =

The Irisbus Midirider is a midibus made by Iveco Bus (formerly Irisbus).
