= Iveco CityClass =

Iveco 491 CityClass
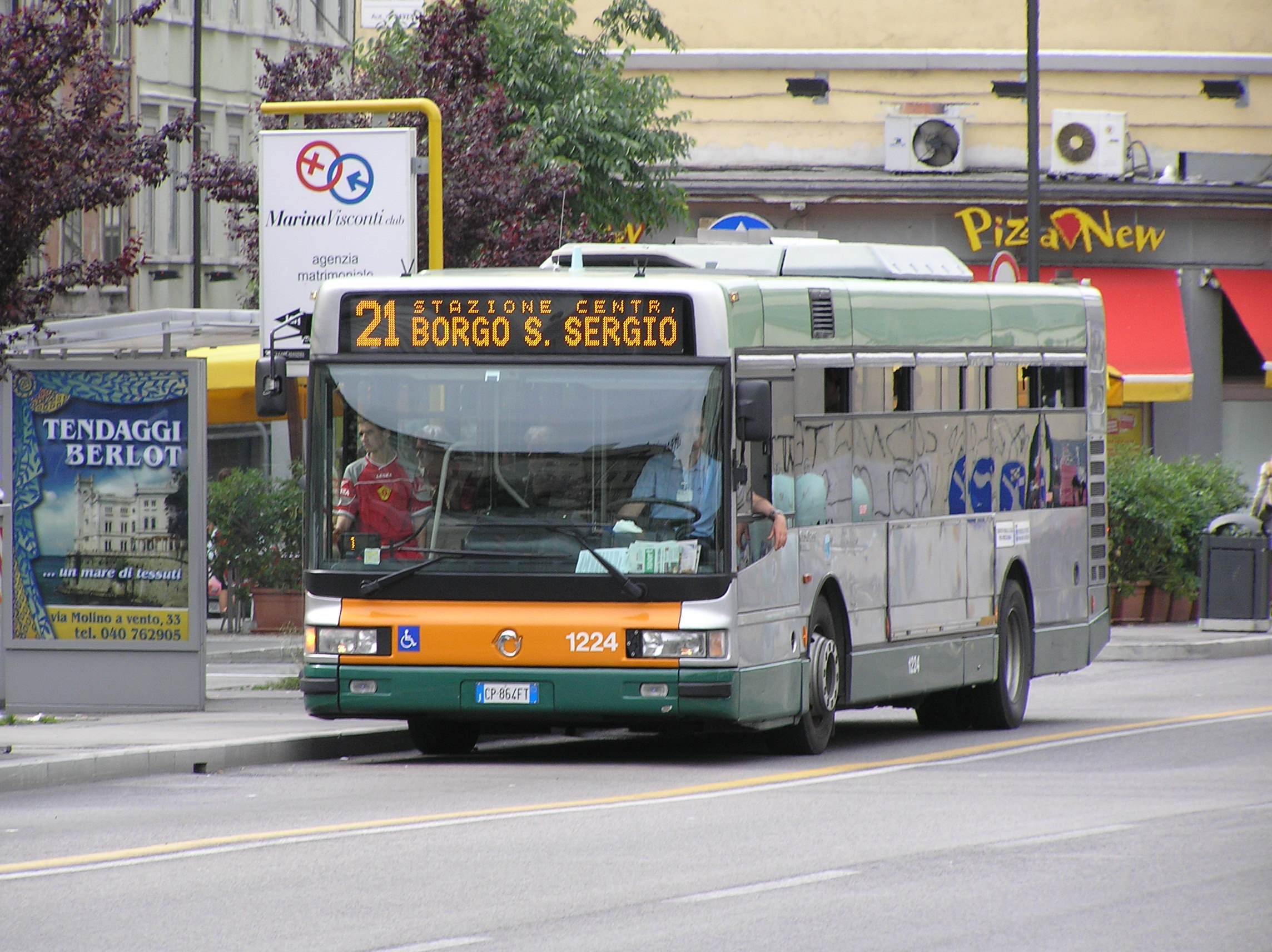

Overview
- Manufacturer: Italy Iveco; EU Irisbus
- Also called: Irisbus CityClass
- Model years: 1997-1999: Iveco; 2000-2009: Irisbus
- Assembly: Italy, Ufita valley
- Designer: Giorgetto Giugiaro (Only the italian version)

Body and chassis
- Body style: Urban and suburban bus
- Layout: Transversal, rear overhang; Longitudinal, rear overhang
- Doors: 2, 3 and 4 doors

Powertrain
- Engine: L6 * Diesel Fiat 8360.46V * CNG Fiat 8469.21S * Diesel Iveco Cursor 8F2B * CNG Iveco Cursor 8CNGF2BE
- Transmission: Automatic ZF 5HP500; Automatic Voith DIWA 854.3E

Dimensions
- Wheelbase: 5 150 / 6 050 / 5 710+6 605
- Length: 10.5 m (34.4 ft); 12 m (39.4 ft); 18 m (59.1 ft)
- Width: 2.5 m (8.2 ft)
- Height: 2.965 m (9.7 ft)
- Kerb weight: 10,390 kg (22,910 lb); 12,520 kg (27,600 lb); 18,290 kg (40,320 lb)

Chronology
- Predecessor: Iveco TurboCity
- Successor: Irisbus Citelis

The Iveco CityClass is an urban, suburban and peri-urban bus launched by the Iveco bus division in 1997 and renamed Irisbus in 2000. It is the equivalent of Agora in France. It succeeds the Iveco 490 TurboCity UR Green urban bus, later replaced by the Irisbus Citelis.

As usual at Iveco, the CityClass is available in two versions: series 491 urban bus and series 591 suburban as well as in various lengths: 10.80 meters, 12 meters and 18 meters articulated.

== History ==
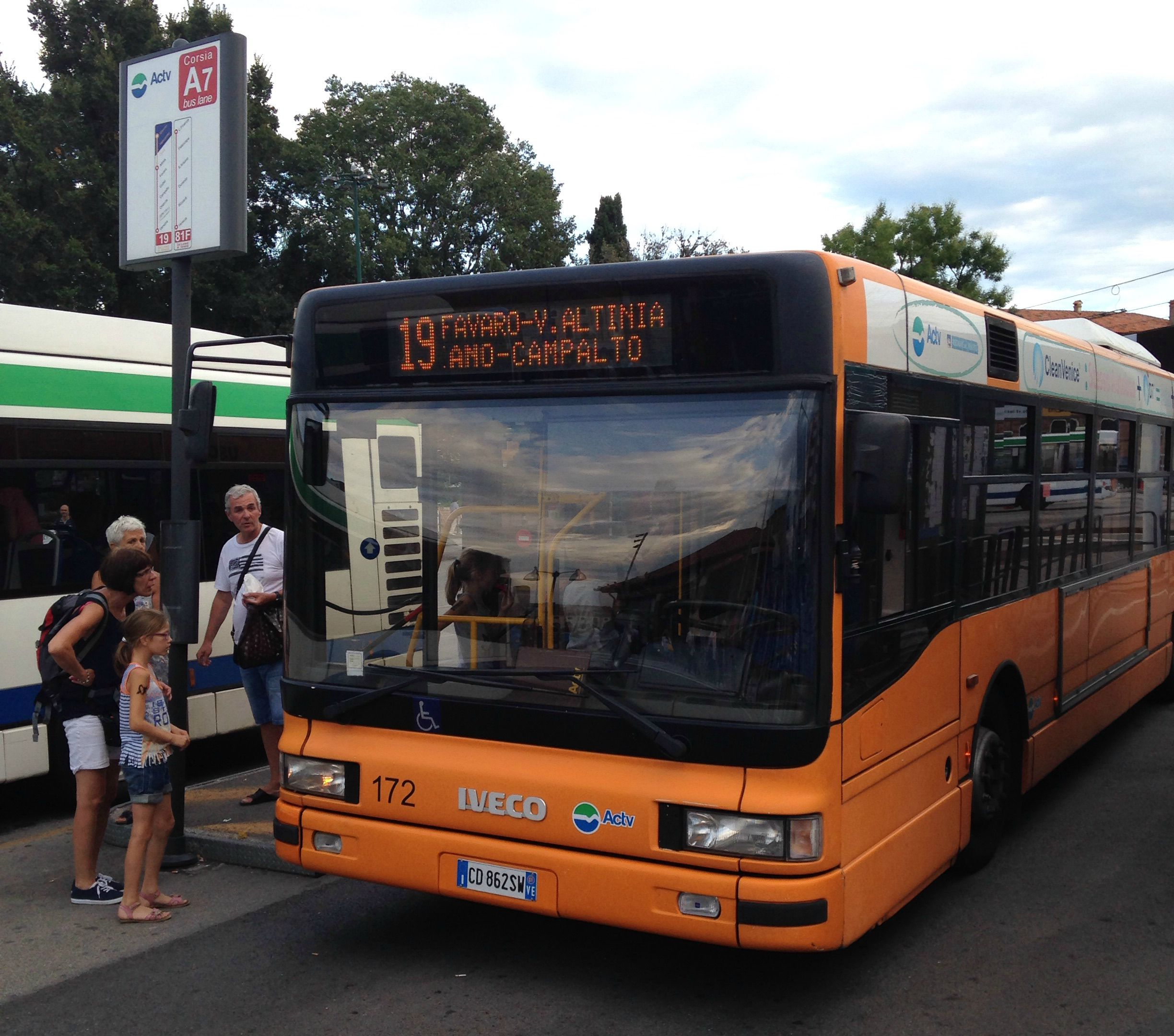
Iveco CityClass

The Iveco CityClass was presented to professionals and the general public in 1995 at the Paris Motor Show. It was marketed with the MY 1997. Renamed the Irisbus in 2000 when the Iveco-RVI bus divisions merged, it remained in production until 2008. A total of 10,000 units were built, including over 7,000 in Italy.

The CityClass project was created in the 90s by the Italian designer Giorgetto Giugiaro and was presented to the public in 1996 to replace the Iveco TurboCity.

In 2001 ALTRA, in collaboration with Ansaldo Ricerche, Sapio, International Fuel Cells, Exide, T_V and Centro Ricerche Fiat and with the patronage of the Italian Ministry of Environment as well as Piedmont, developed a version with electric traction powered by hydrogen put into service in Turin on behalf of GTT, and also used for the 2006 Winter Olympics. It was the first Italian hydrogen bus.

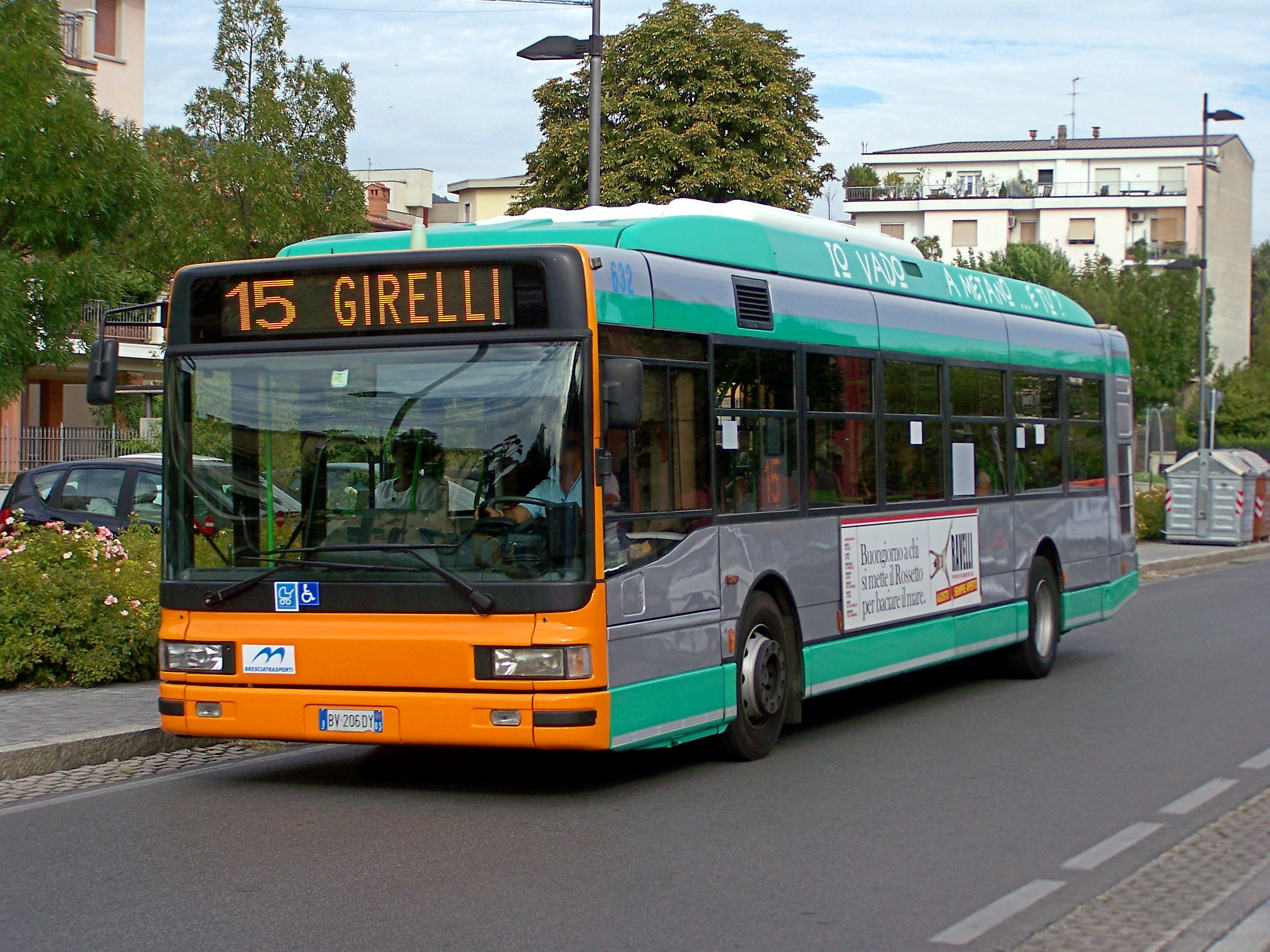
An Iveco CityClass of Brescia Trasporti powered by compressed natural gas.

Under the Iveco brand (1997 - 1999)

The Iveco 491 CityClass was manufactured and marketed between 1997 and 2000.

Under the Irisbus brand (2000 - 2008)

At the end of 1999, the Iveco logo on the CityClass grille was replaced by the Irisbus dolphin and will remain so, in Europe, until 2008.

=== Operation ===
The CityClass model, of which more than 7,000 units have been produced in Italy, is undoubtedly the most distributed urban bus in Europe. In addition to the big Italian cities such as Milan, Rome, Genoa and Turin where its distribution is almost monopolistic, it is in service in all public (and private) transport services in Italy. The CityClass has also found wide outlets abroad: Switzerland, France, Germany, Romania, South Korea and above all Spain and Greece. In most Spanish cities, the CityClass, bodied by Spanish companies Castrosua, Hispano Carrocera and Noge, is the most widespread in the urban transport fleet.

== Generations ==
- In 2001, the CityClass was fitted with a new Iveco engine called the Cursor that developed 290 horsepower for the 10 and 12 meter models. Previously, they received Fiat V.I. type 8360.46V that developed 220, 250 or 270 hp, depending on the chosen configuration. The articulated CityClass version will also feature a new 350 hp Iveco Cursor engine that replaces the previous 310 hp Fiat engine.
- Starting in 2005, the Cursor engine, in a suitable version, will also equip the CNG versions that will develop 270 horsepower.

== The different versions ==
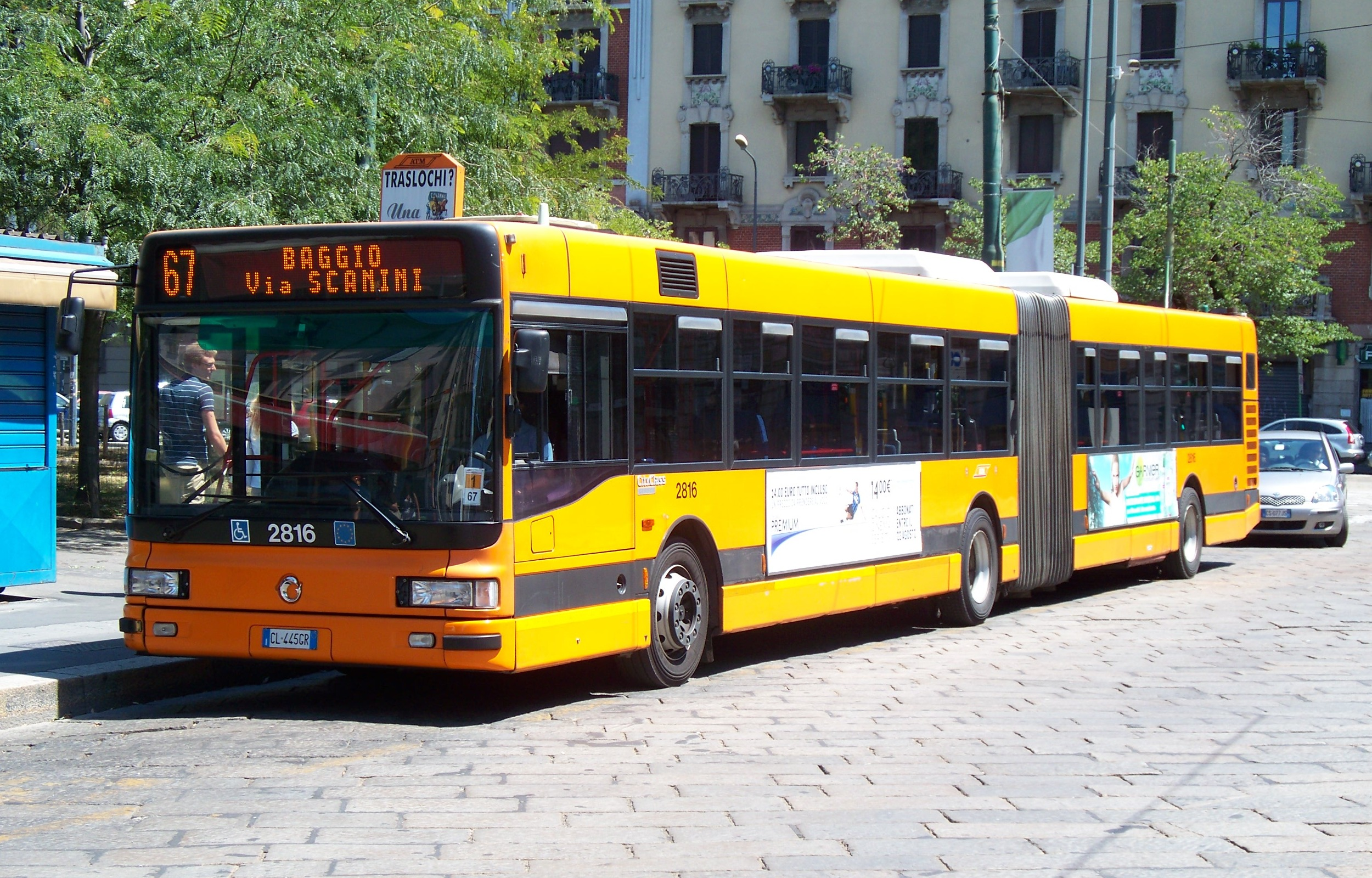
Iveco 491 CityClass 18m version

CityClass 491 (urban)

CityClass urban model. Available in midibus (10.80 m), standard (12 m) and articulated (18 m) versions. The Italian versions of 12 meters with 4 double doors have 108 seats: 18 seated and 93 standing and 1 space for the disabled with a ramp at the 3rd access door. The CNG version has 88 seats: 24 seated, 63 standing and 1 PRM. The French version with only 2 double doors offers 114 and 95 seats respectively. The 18-meter articulated version has 140 seats, of which 33 are seated, 105 standing and 1 PRM with a ramp at the 2nd door.

CityClass 591 (suburban)

Urban and suburban model of the CityClass. It has more seats than the urban version. It also exists in midibus (10.80 m), standard (12 m) and articulated (18 m). The 12-meter version has 96 seats: 37 seated, 57 standing and 1 PRM with access ramp. The 18 meter articulated version has 113 places, including 71 seated, 41 standing and 1 PRM.

=== The Spanish CityClass ===
In Spain, most CityClass 491 had bodies from Castrosua, Noge and Hispano.

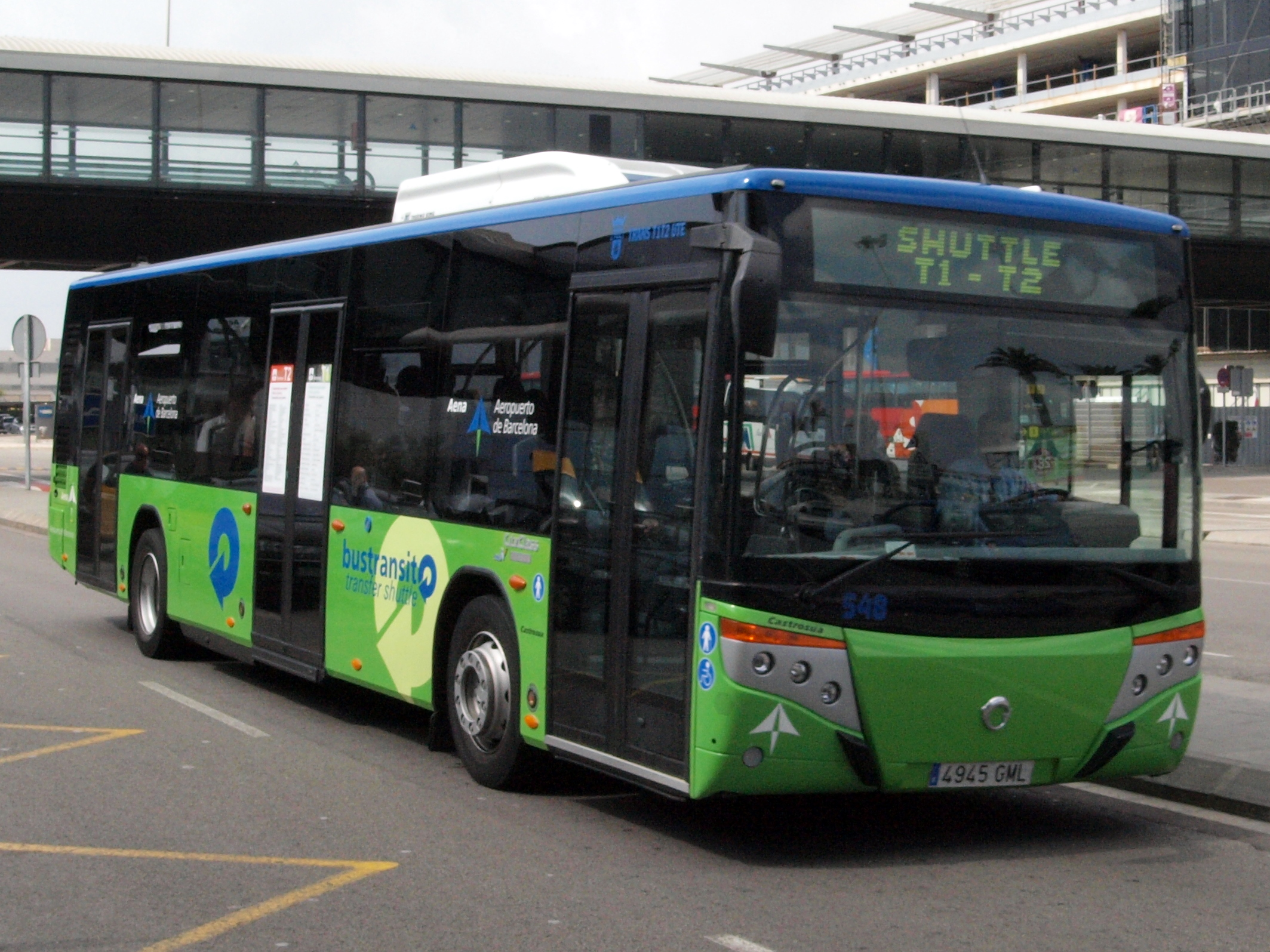
Irisbus CityClass bodied by Castrosua (Castrosua City Versus)

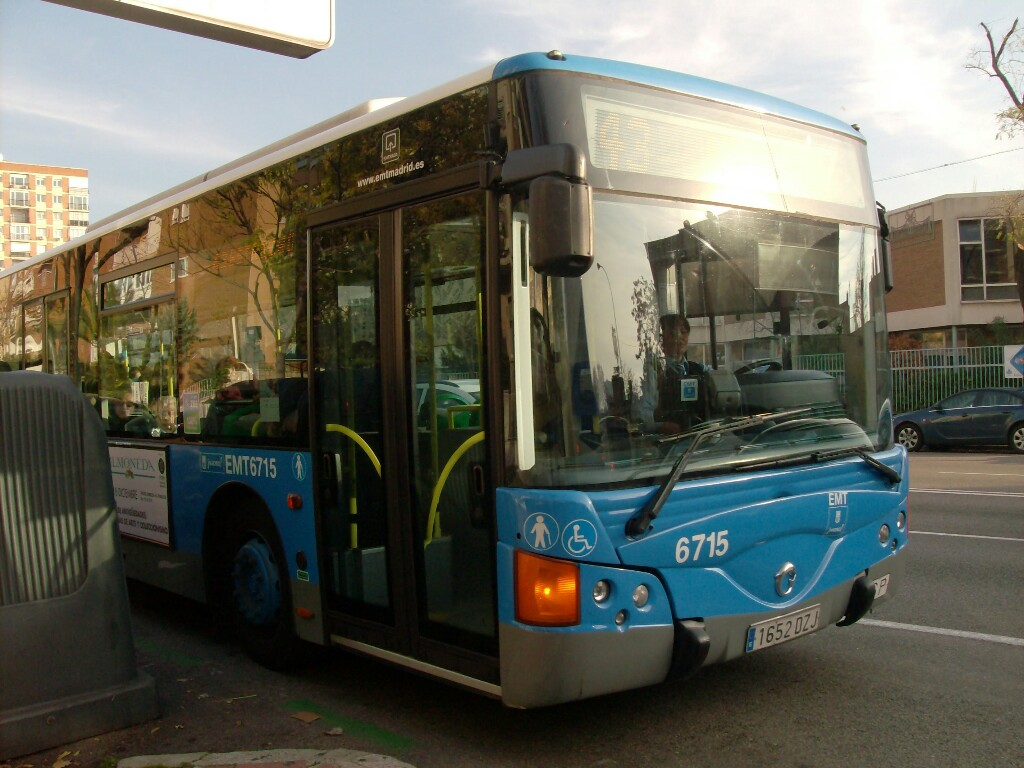
Irisbus CityClass bodied by Noge (Noge Cittour)

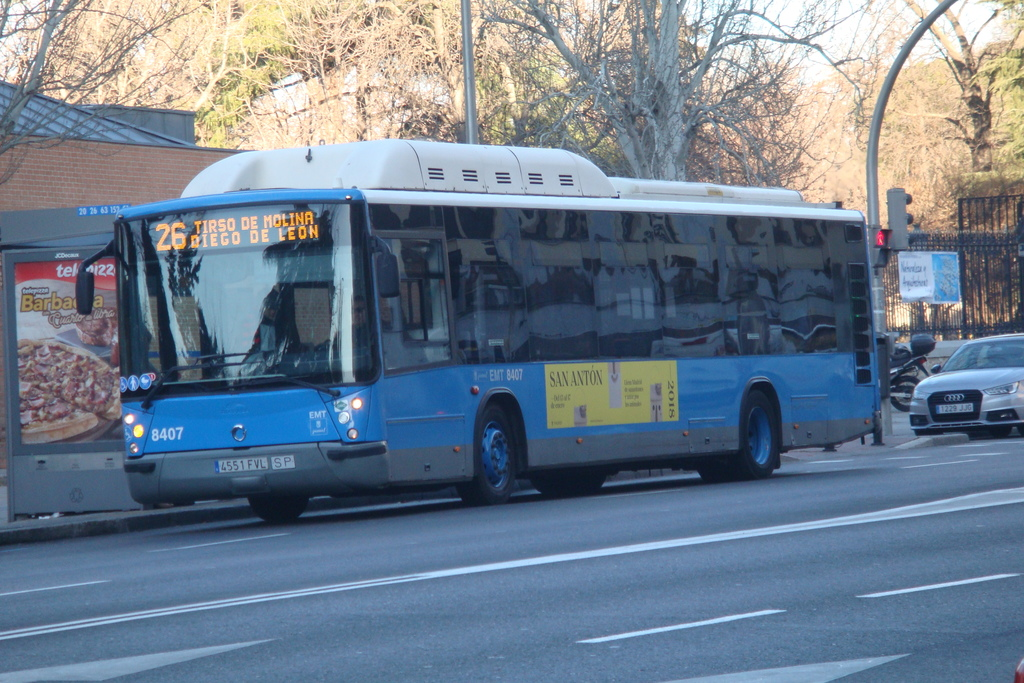
Irisbus CityClass bodied by Hispano Carrocera (Hispano Habit)

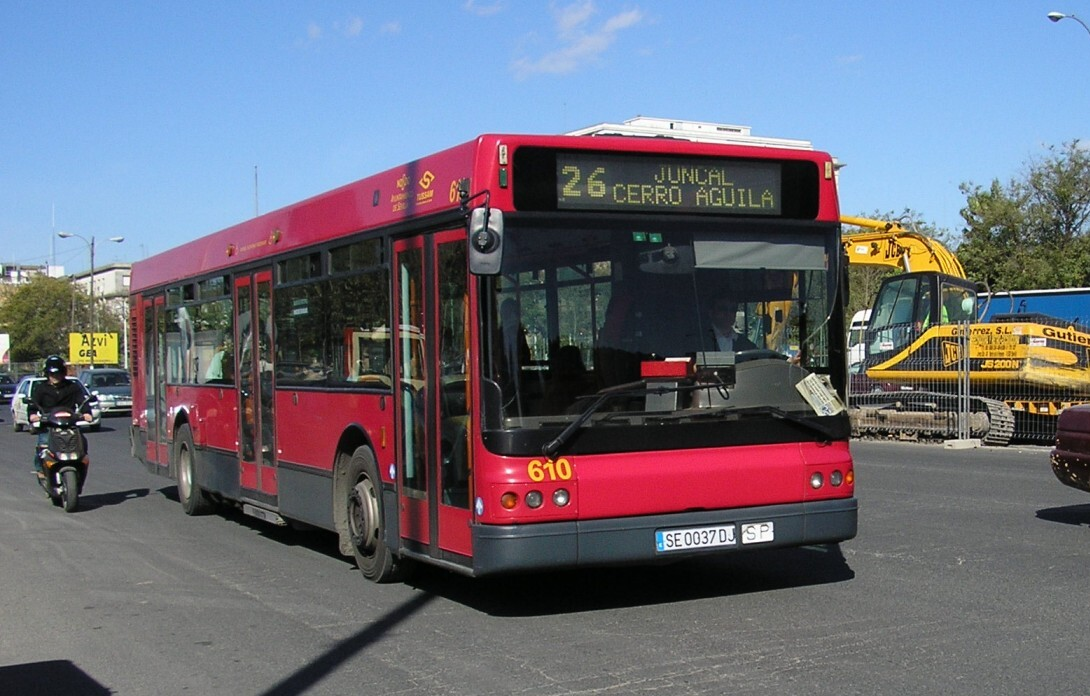
Iveco CityClass bodied by Hispano Carrocera (Hispano V.O.V)

=== The ecologic CityClass ===
The Fiat group and its truck and bus division, Iveco, have paid attention to protecting the environment with cutting-edge research on consumption reduction, exhaust gas filtration, the first equipment of which dates back to 1980. In February 1999, the city of Turin launched the "hydrogen bus" project. In November of that same year, the Italian Ministry of the Environment approved this project as well as the Temporary Association of Companies (ATI) that would be in charge of carrying out the project. ATI was made up of six companies: GTT (former ATM - municipal authority for urban transport of the Piedmontese capital), Iveco (second largest bus manufacturer in the world), Sapio (one of the main Italian producers of technical and medical gases), CVA - Compagnia Valdostana delle Acque SpA (producer of renewable electricity), ENEA - Ente per le Nuove tecnologie, l'Energia e l'Ambiente (Public Research Center for Innovation and Sustainable Development), Ansaldo Ricerche (Department of investigation of the Ansaldo group). The project was financed by the Italian Ministry of the Environment and the Fiat Ricerche Center financed its implementation in one of its bus models.

With the creation of Irisbus in 1999, Iveco launched an ambitious project on a hydrogen-powered city bus, a system called Fuel Cell. A prototype was built and tested in 2002 with VIN code ZGA482.E0E0E0.00001. The tests, supervised by the Italian Ministry of Transport and the Environment, lasted 2 years. During this time, three 12 meter CityClass Fuel Cell buses were manufactured. After the approval of the prototype in Italy, these buses were delivered to urban transport companies in Turin, Barcelona and Germany (Munich) on November 1, 2004.

The Turin CityClass could be seen in service during the 2006 Winter Olympics. Its autonomy was 12 hours at a speed of 60 km/h. It could accommodate 73 passengers including 21 seated, 51 standing and 1 PRM wheelchair. It had 9 bottles of hydrogen for a total of 1,260 liters at 200 bar.

A prototype CityClass with a hybrid engine was also successfully tested.

== Characteristic ==
The Iveco CityClass was available in three different lengths (10.8 m, 12 m or 18 m) and was 2.50 wide. It could carry from 88 to 108 people in its standard version or 140 people in the articulated version.

All CityClass models are equipped with 2, 3 or 4 side doors, front and side travel signal display, ABS and ASR, stereo, microphone and radio installation, air conditioning. Access on board for the disabled is facilitated thanks to the body's lateral tilting system, Kneeling. A wheelchair ramp is provided.

=== Dimensions ===
	CityClass 491.10	CityClass 491.12	CityClass 491.12 CNG	CityClass 491.12 Fuel Cell	CityClass 491.18	CityClass 491.18 CNG	CityClass 591.10	CityClass 591.12	CityClass 591.18
Length (mm)	10 805	11 995		11 995	17 960		10 800	11 995	17 960
Width (mm)	2 500								
Height (mm)	2 965			3 300	2 965				
Distance betwheen axes (mm)	5 150	6 050			5 710 + 6 605		5 150	6 050	5 710 + 6 605
Overhang front/rear (mm)	2 565 / 3 080	2 565 / 3 380			2 565 / 3 080		2 565 / 3 080	2 565 / 3 380	2 565 / 3 080
Turning radius between walls (m)	7,17	8,74		8,97	10,28		7,17	8,74	10,28
Empty weight (kg)	10 600	11 230	12 520	14 000	18 200	19 100	10 650	11 250	18 200
Weight (kg)	17 500	18 990		19 000	27 950		18 000	19 000	27 950
Sitting capacity + standing = maxi (U)	29 + 66 + 1 PRM = 82	19 + 89 + 1 PRM = 109	25 + 63 + 1 PRM = 89	22 + 50 + 1 PRM = 73	33 + 108 + 1 PRM = 142	33 + 106 + 1 PRM = 140	34 + 48 = 82	42 + 57 = 99	34 + 108 + 1 PRM = 143
Doors (U); 1 360 mm	2 (3 for the Italian market)	3 (4 for the Italian market)			4		2 (for the Italian market)	2 ou 3	3
Floor height (mm)	305								

=== Engines ===
	CityClass 491.10	CityClass 491.12	CityClass 491.12 CNG	CityClass 491.12 Fuel Cell	CityClass 491.18	CityClass 491.18 CNG	CityClass 591.10	CityClass 591.12	CityClass 591.18
Engines cylinder types (cm 3)	Diesel FIAT 8360.46V; 7 685 Iveco Cursor 8 F2B 7 790		GNV Fiat 8469.21S; 9 500 Iveco Cursor 8 CNG F2BE 7 790	Hydrogen Ansaldo	Diesel and GNC; Iveco 8469.41S; 9 500		Diesel and GNC	Diesel and GNV Iveco Cursor 8 F2B; 7 790	* Diesel: Iveco Cursor 8 F2B; 7 790 * GNV: Iveco 8469.41S; 9 500
Power (kW (HP DIN) to r/min)	196 (260) to 2 050 a 213 (290) to 2 050		177 (240) to 2 100; 200 (270) to 2 000	164 to 1 550	228 (310) to 2 000			213 (290) to 2 050	* Diesel 213 (290) a 2 050 * GNC 228 (310) a 2 000
Torque (N m to r/min)	1 100 to 1 080-1 800		920 to 1 200; 1 100 to 1 100	1 200 to 600	1 200 to 1 200			* Diésel 1 110 to 1 040 * GNV	* Diesel * GNV 1 200 to 1 200
Transmission	Drive (on rear wheels)								
Gearbox	Automatic ZF 5HP and VOITH D 854								
Brakes	Pneumatic discs (front) and (rear) with ABS and ASR								
Suspension	Air cushions; Hydraulic shock absorbers and torsion bars								
Direction	Power assisted rack and pinion hydraulics								
Autonomy (km)	600	500 puis 600	950	200	500	880		600	500 / 850

== Gallery photos ==
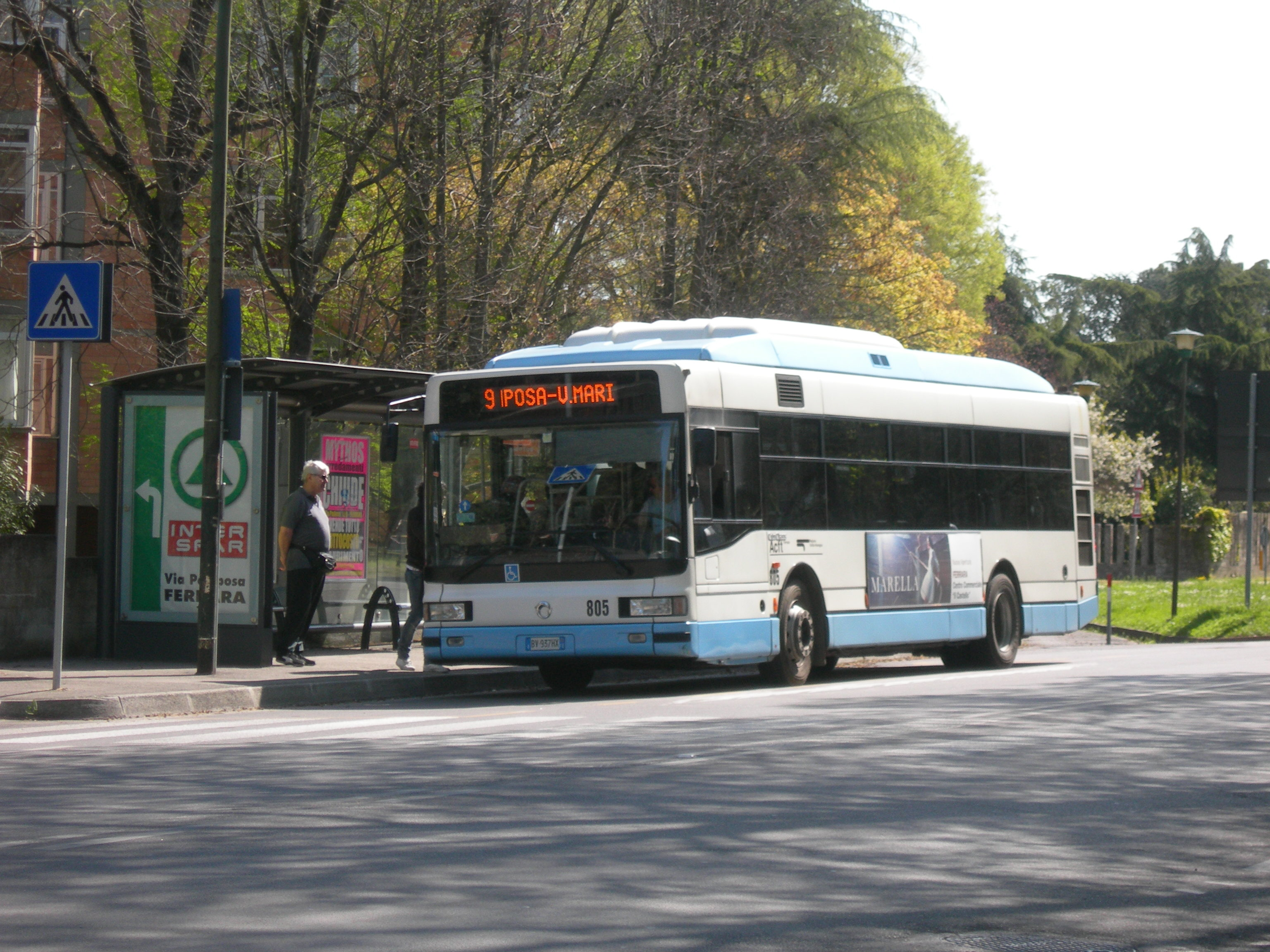
Irisbus CityClass GNV of the late Acft Ferrara, now TPER

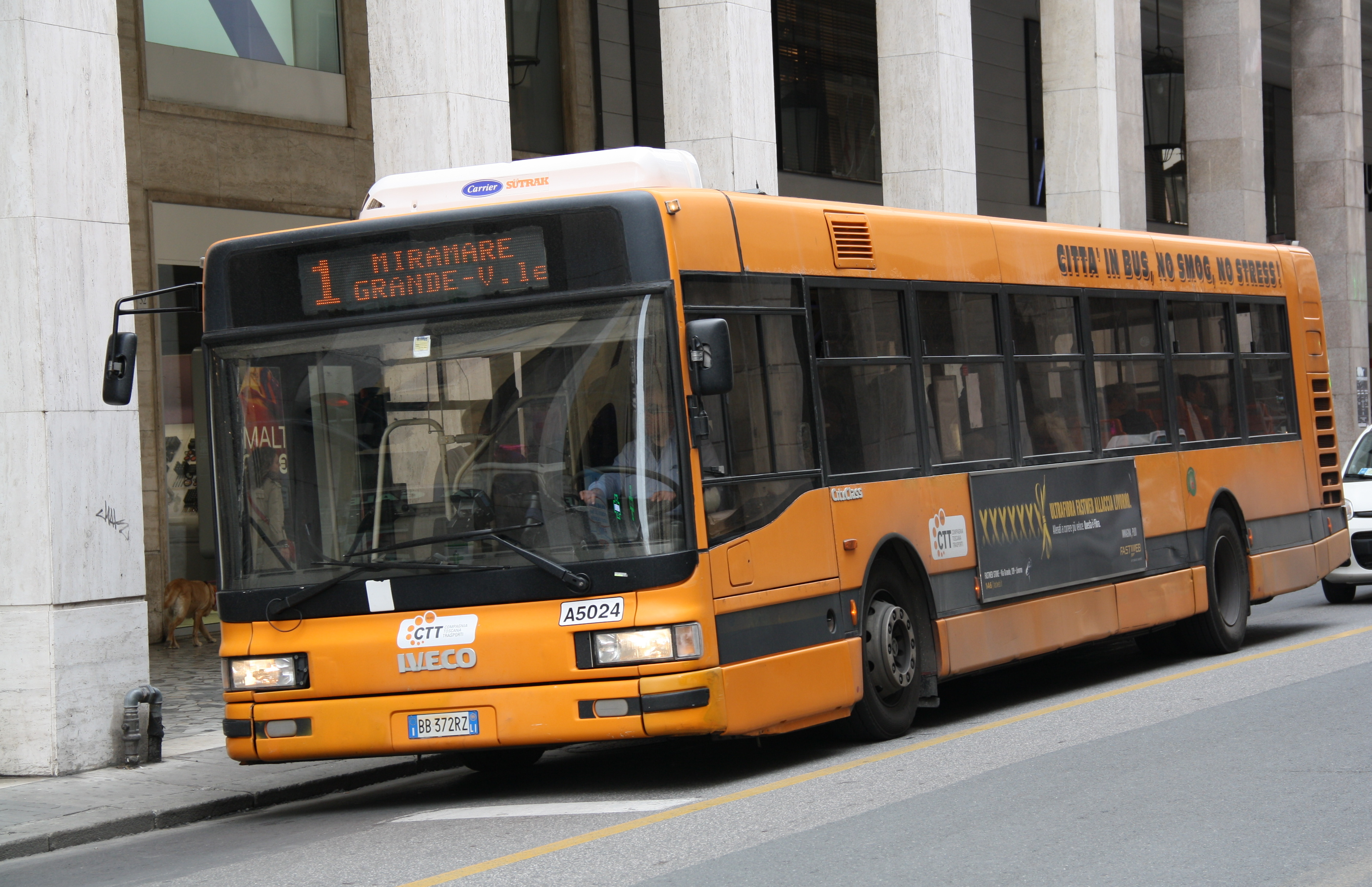
Iveco CityClass diesel

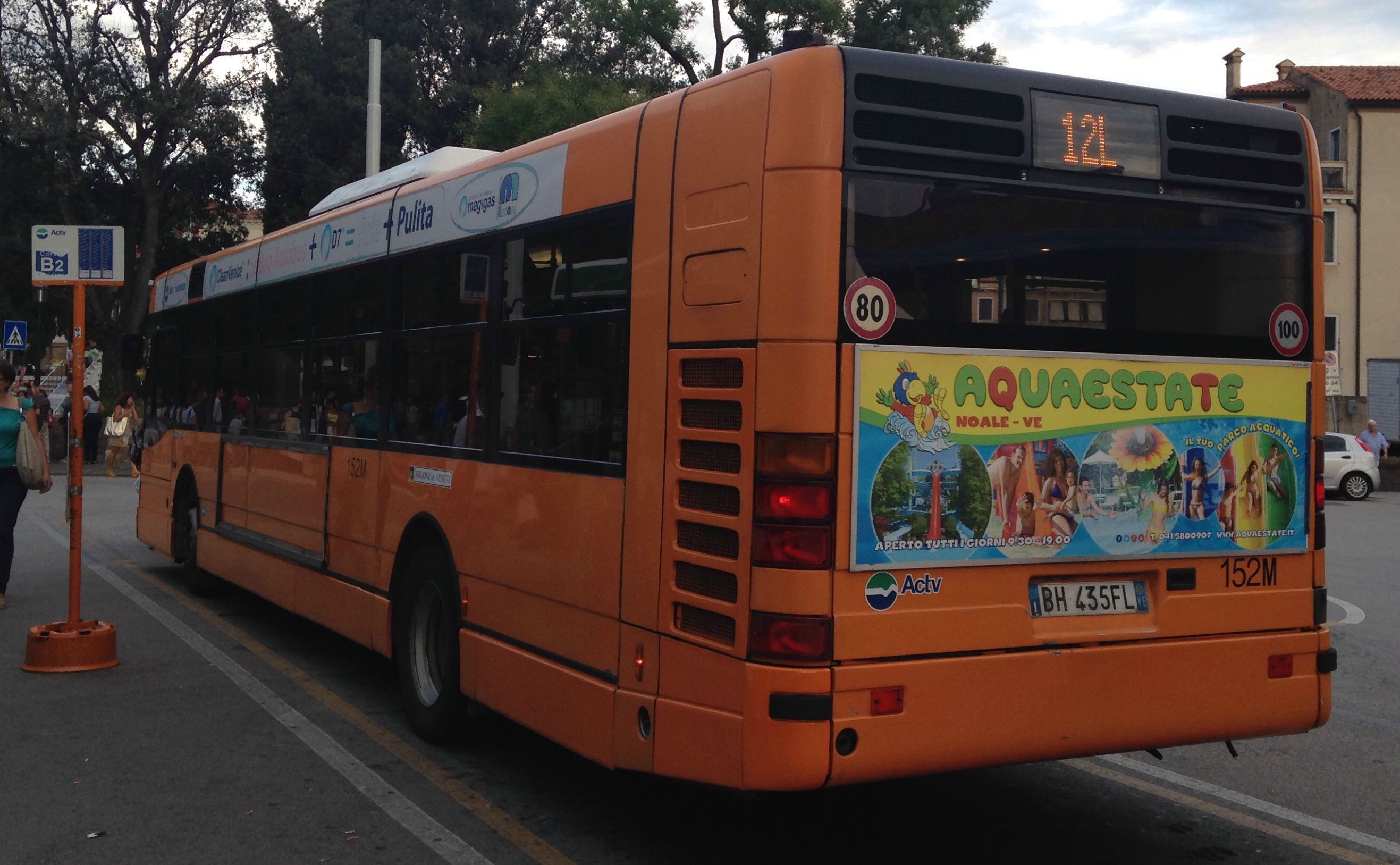
Rear view

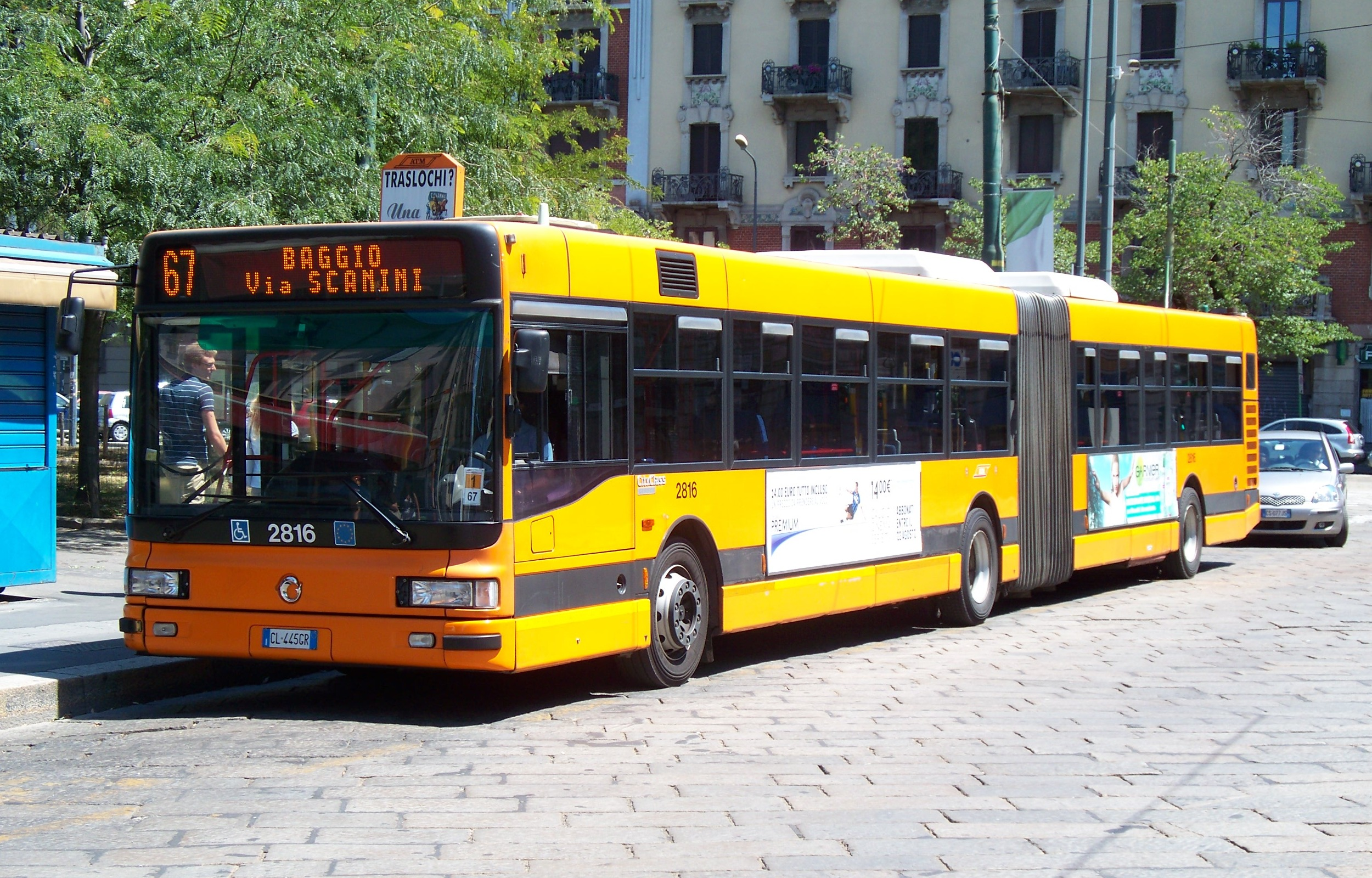
Articulated Irisbus CityClass

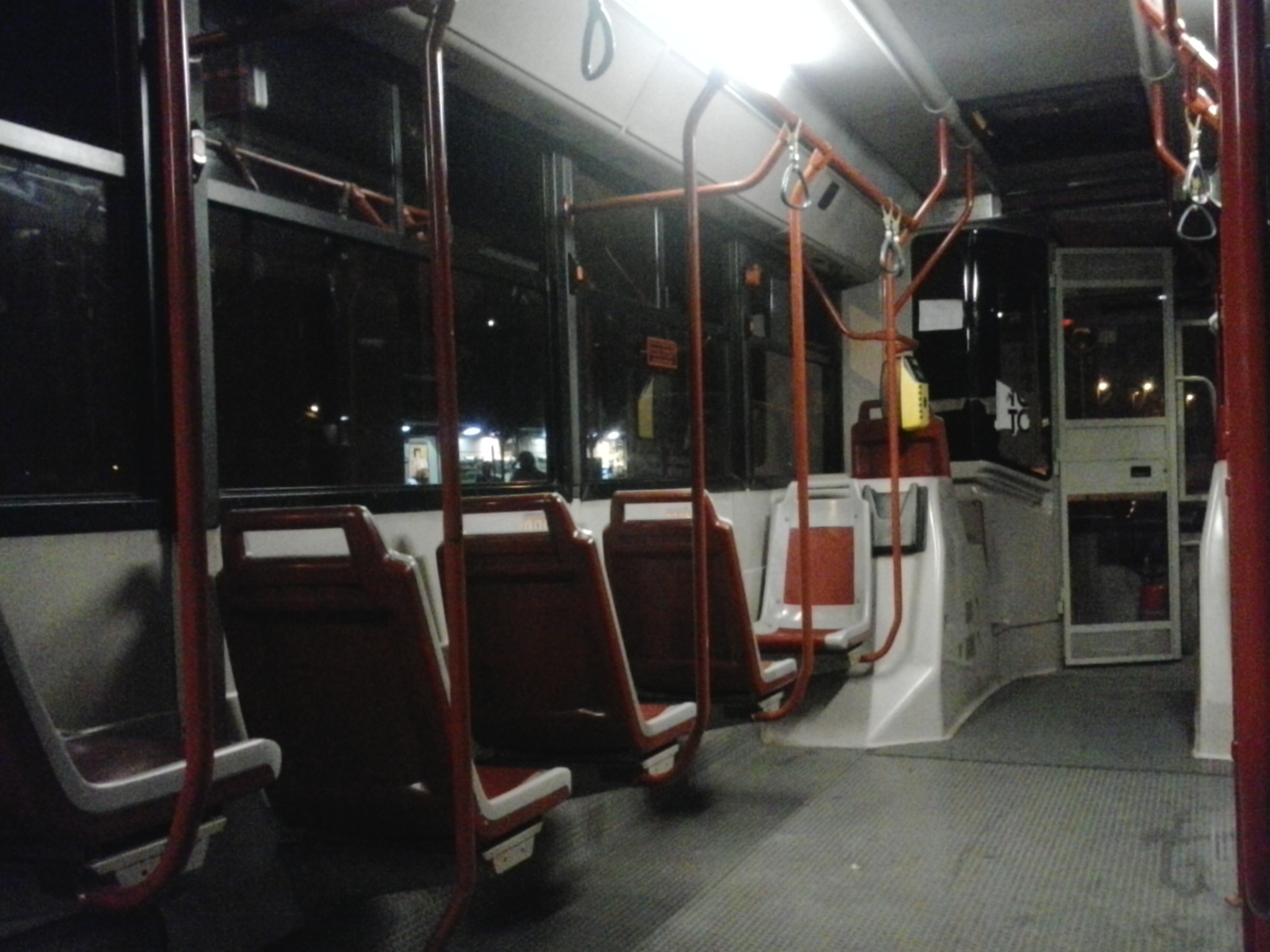
CityClass 491.12's interior

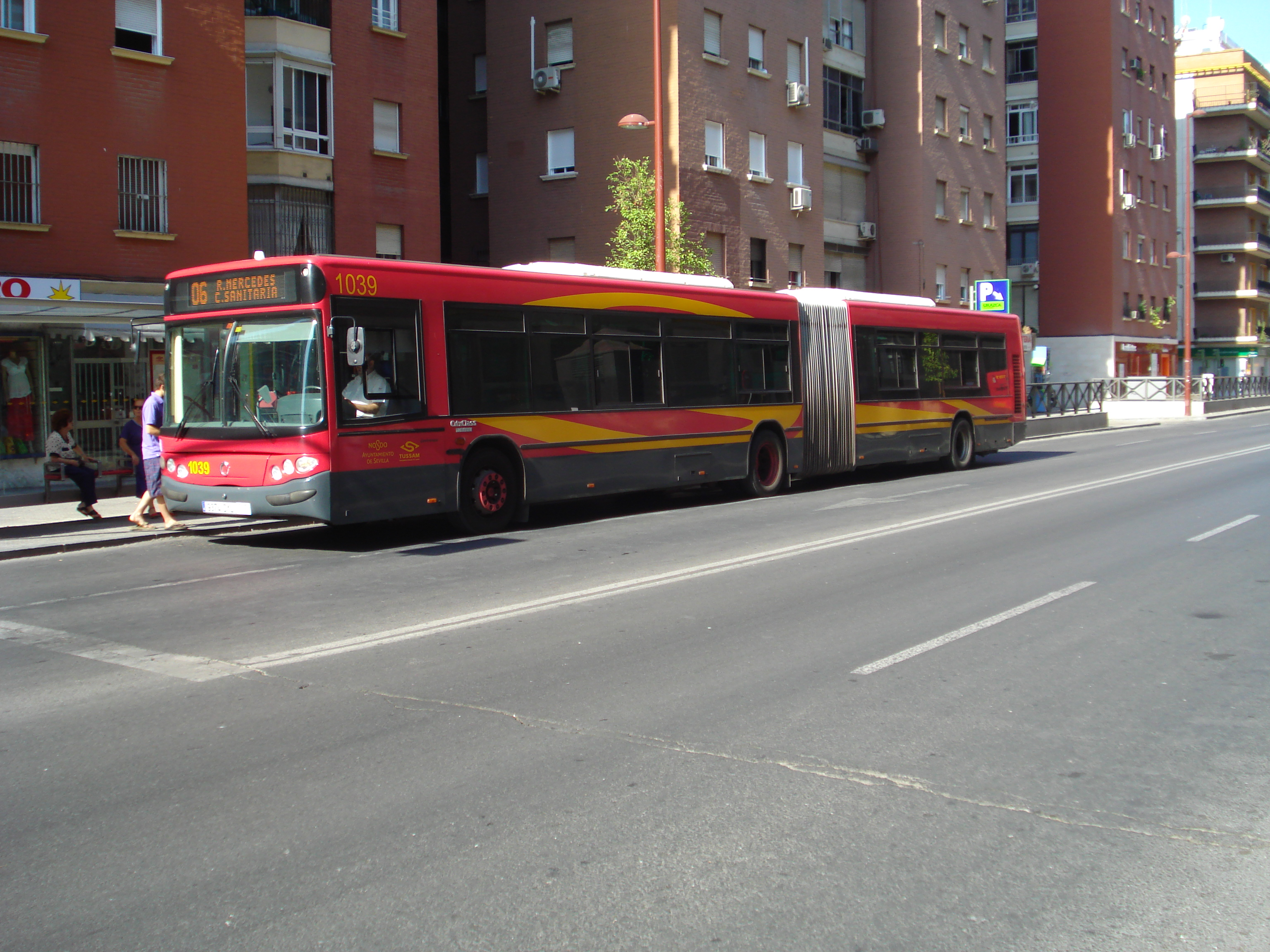
Articulated Spanish CityClass phase I 18m

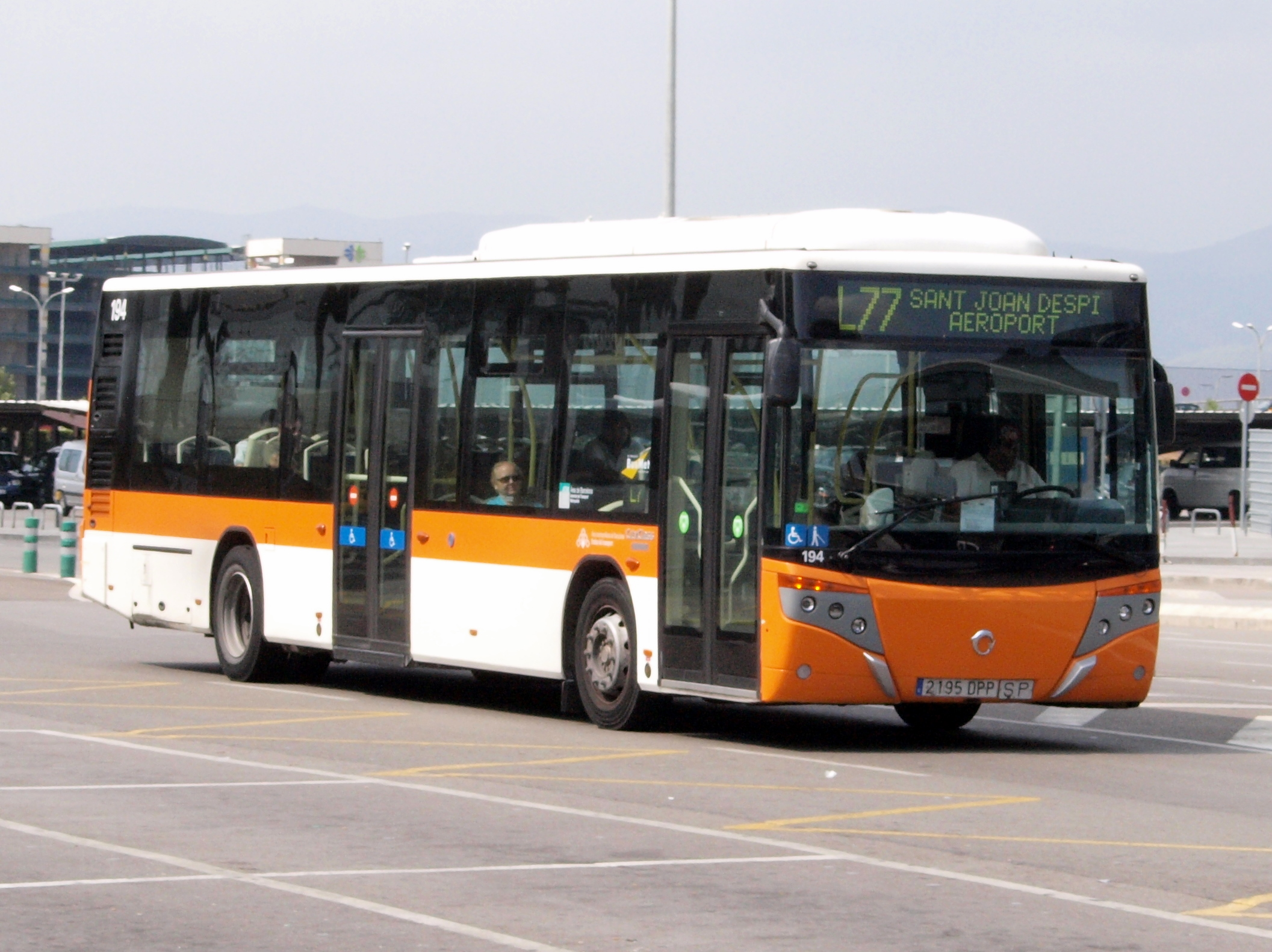
Standard Spanish CityClass phase II 12m

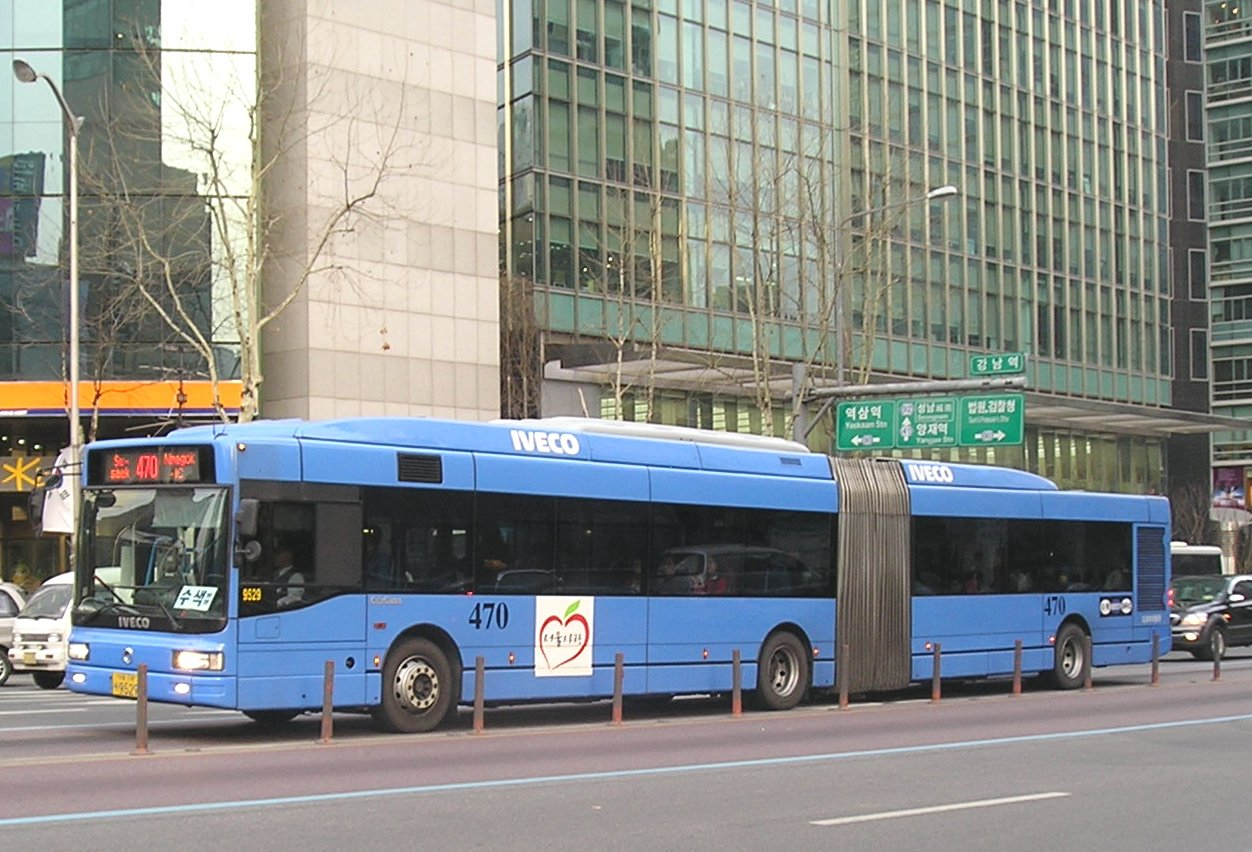
Irisbus CityClass 18m in Seoul, South Korea.

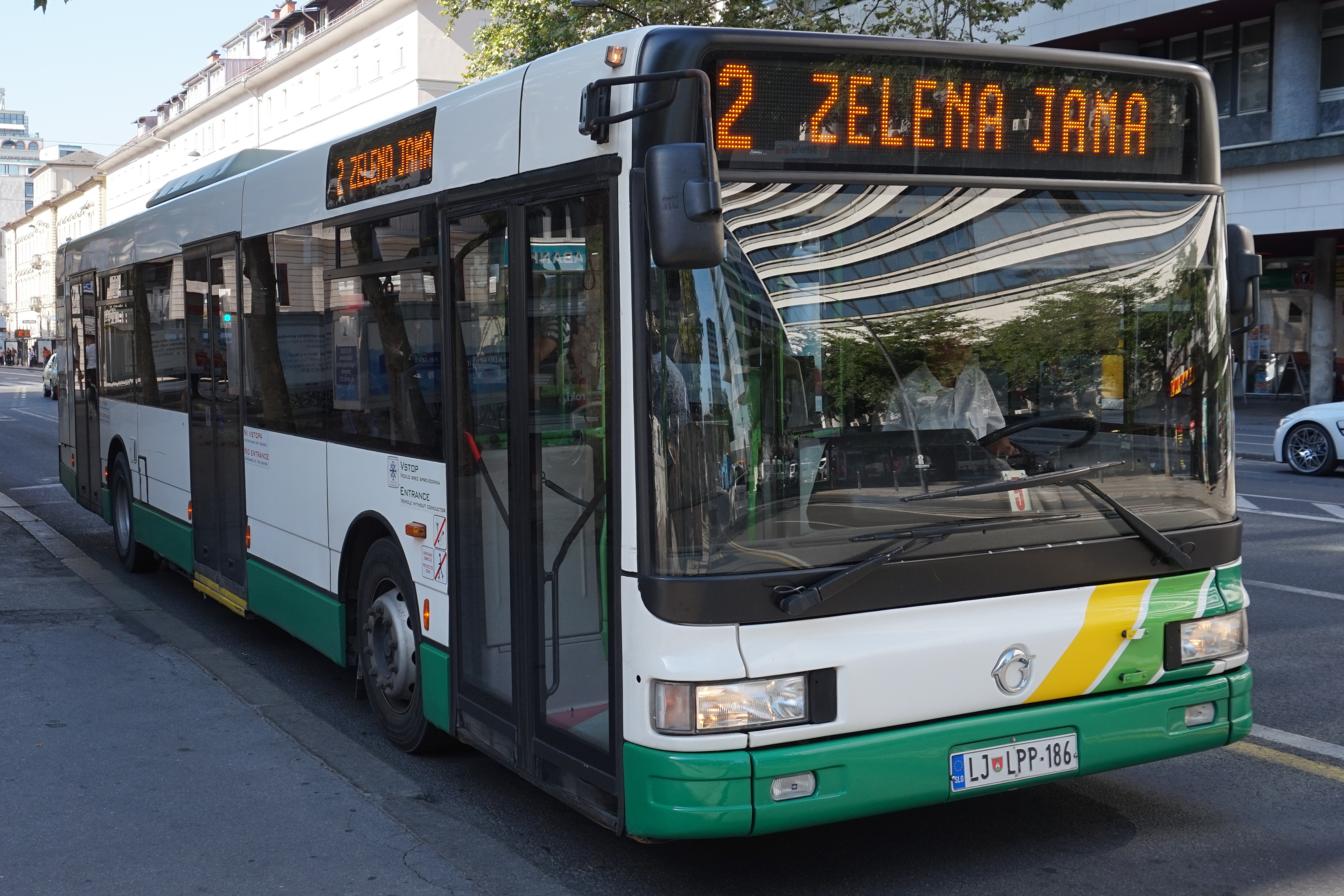
Irisbus CityClass in Slovenia.

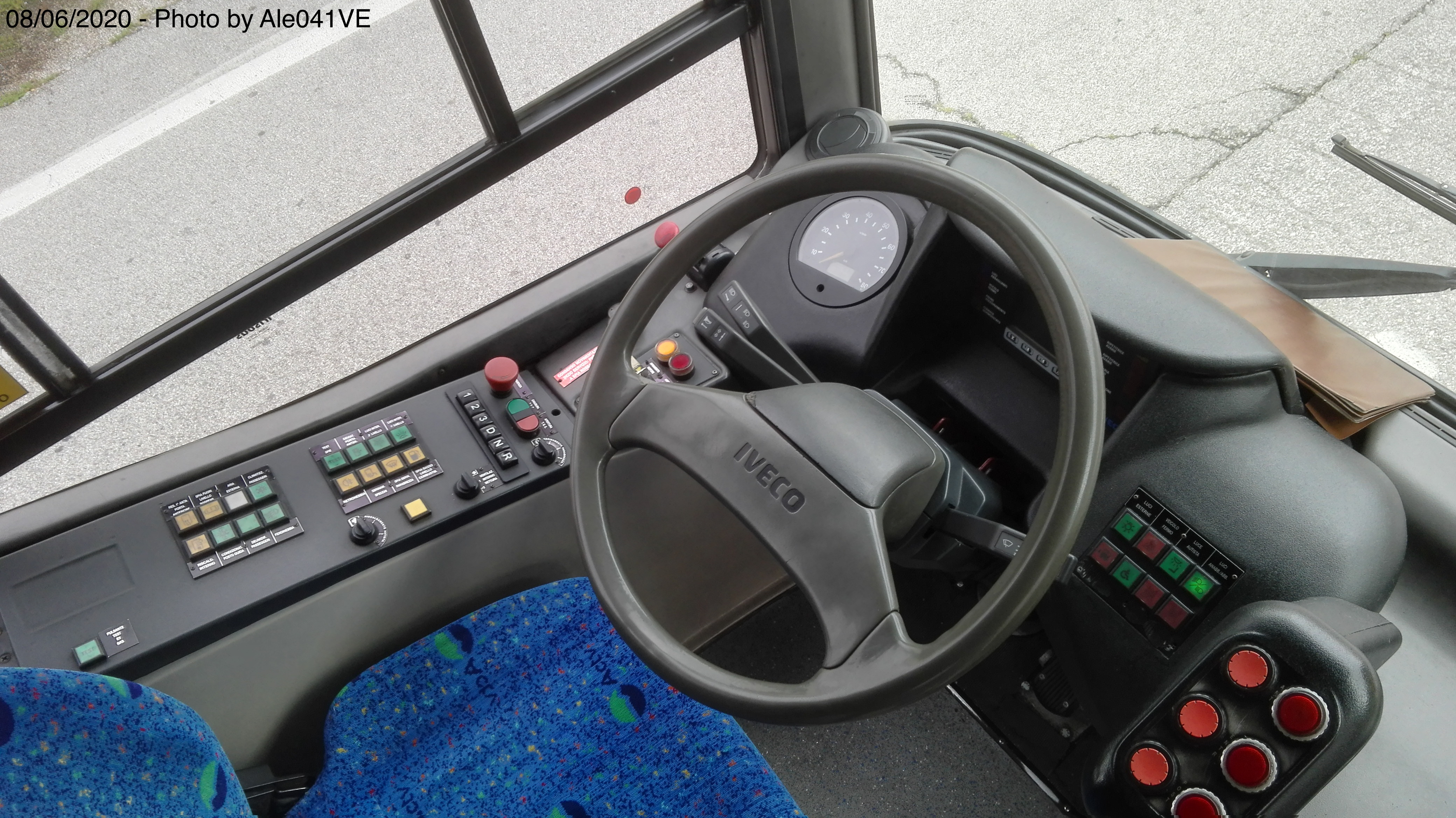
The instrument board of the Italian CityClass.

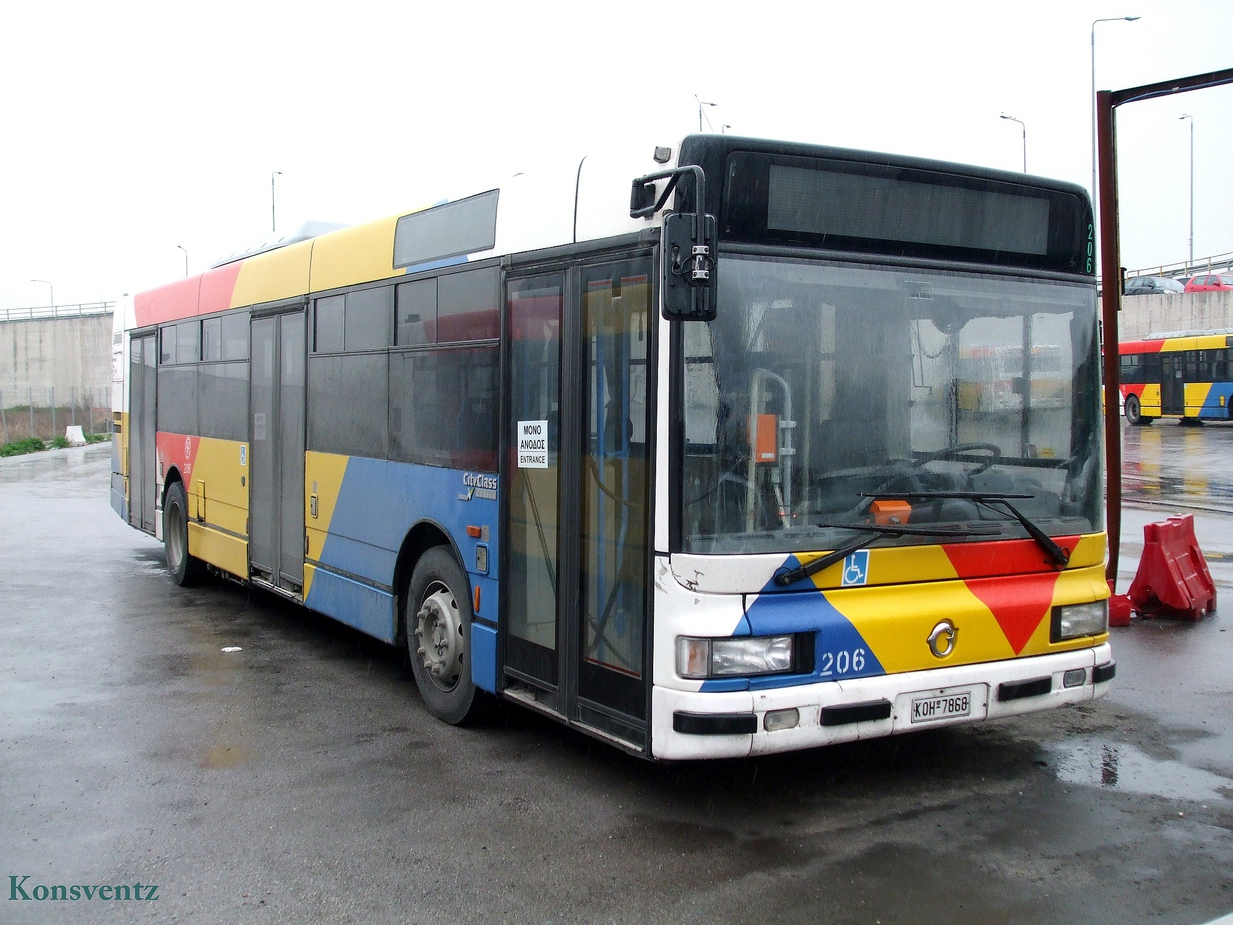
CityClass 491 int Thessaloniki, Greece.

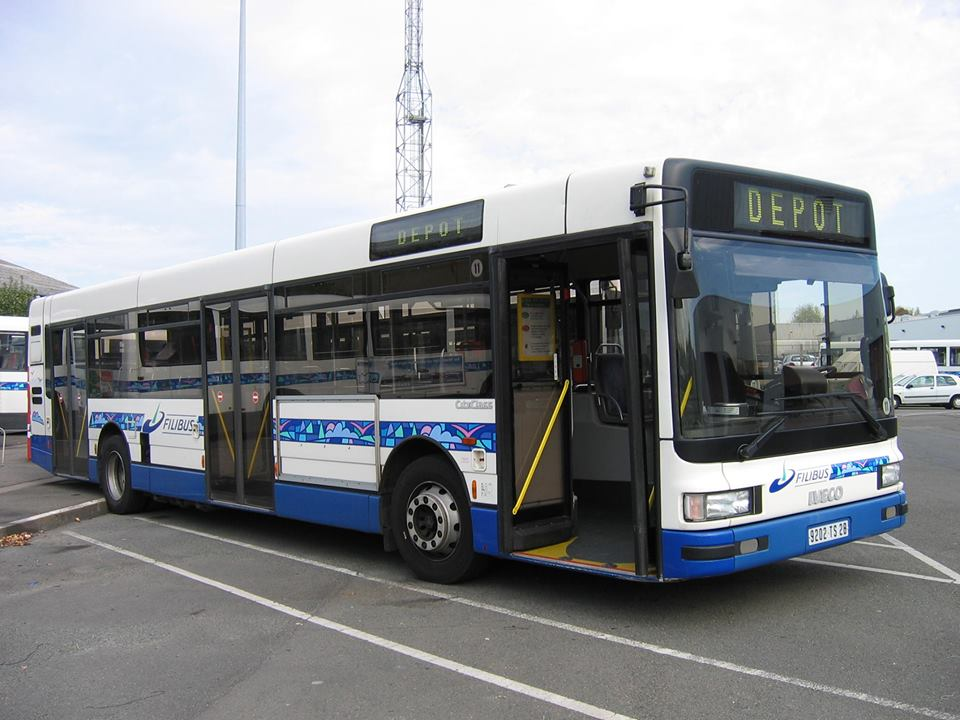
CityClass 491 in Chartres, France.

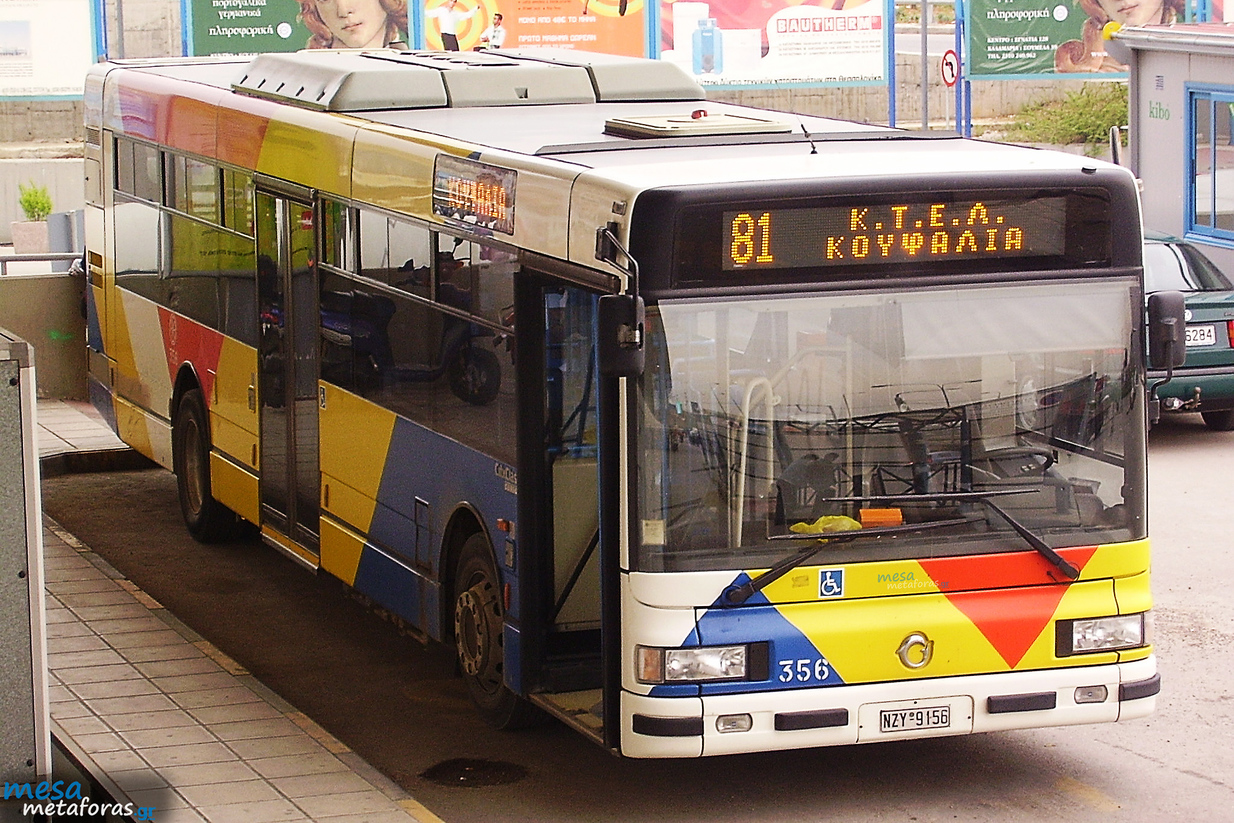
2-door CityClass 491 in Thessaloniki, Greece.

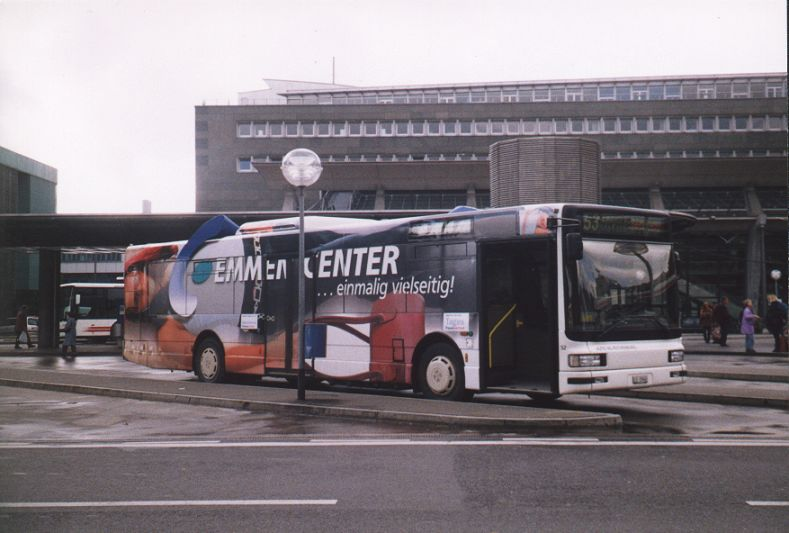
2-door CityClass 491 in Lucerne, Switzerland.
