= Irisbus Europolis =

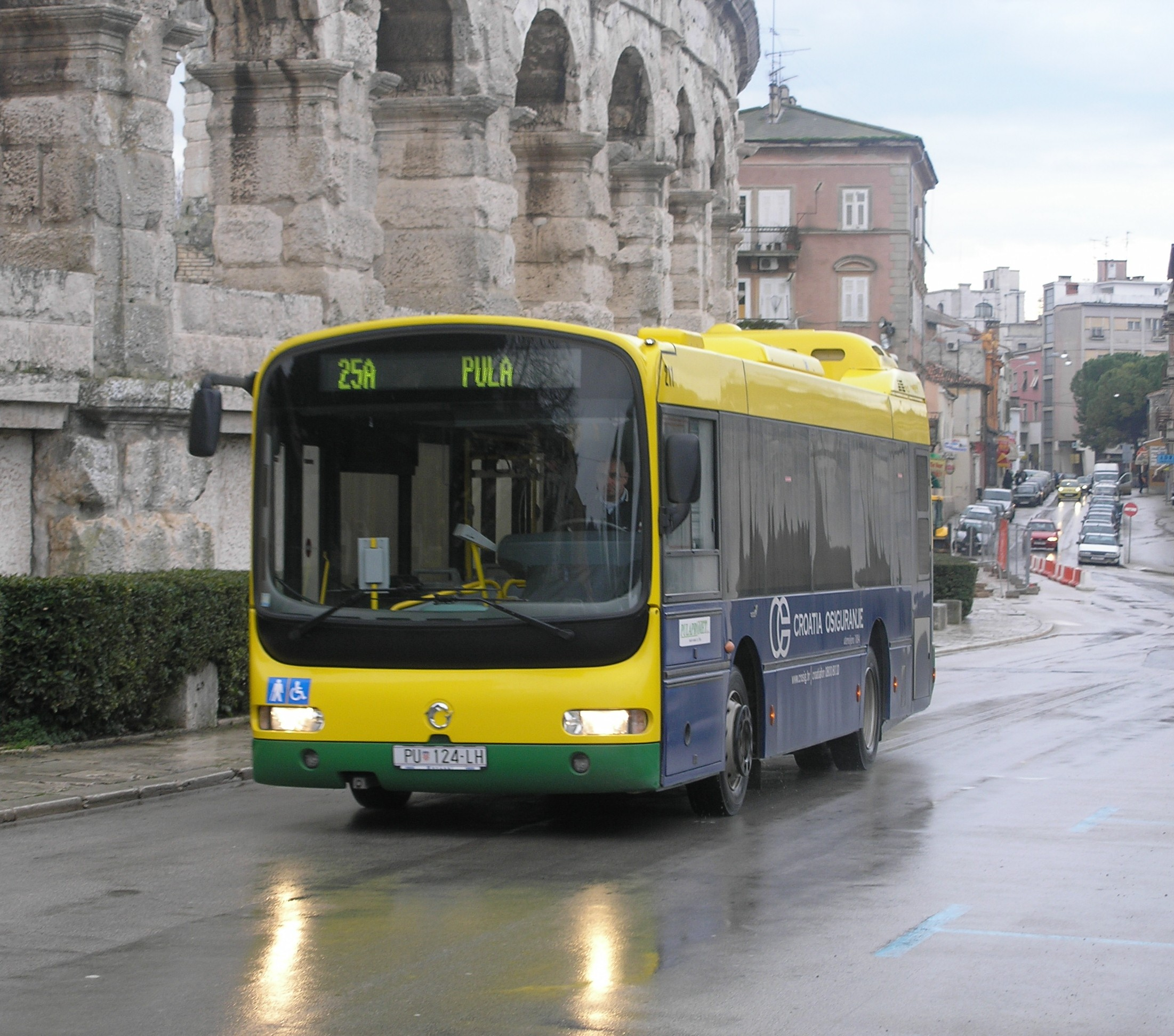
- Europolis in Pula, Croatia

Overview
- Manufacturer: Irisbus

Body and chassis
- Doors: 2
- Floor type: Low floor Low entry
- Chassis: Integral

Powertrain
- Capacity: 49 passengers (23 seats 26 seated)

Dimensions
- Length: 10.7 metres
- Width: 3.1 metres
- Height: 2.6 metres

The Irisbus Europolis is an integrally-constructed low-floor midibus model that can carry 49 passengers, produced by Irisbus (now known as Iveco Bus).

Cities whose transport companies use the Irisbus Europolis include Rome, Reggio Calabria, Cagliari and Terni in Italy, Lyon in France, Pula in Croatia, and Thessaloniki (22 buses) in Greece.
