= Irisbus Midys =

The Irisbus Midys is a midibus made by Iveco Bus.
