= Irisbus Midway =

Type of minibus

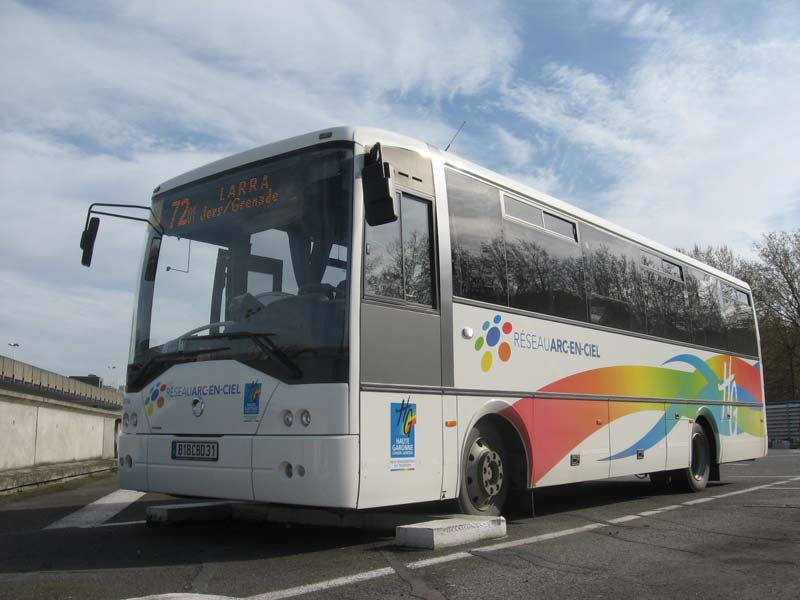

The Irisbus Midway is a midibus produced by Iveco.
