= Iveco Effeuno =

IVECO Effeuno
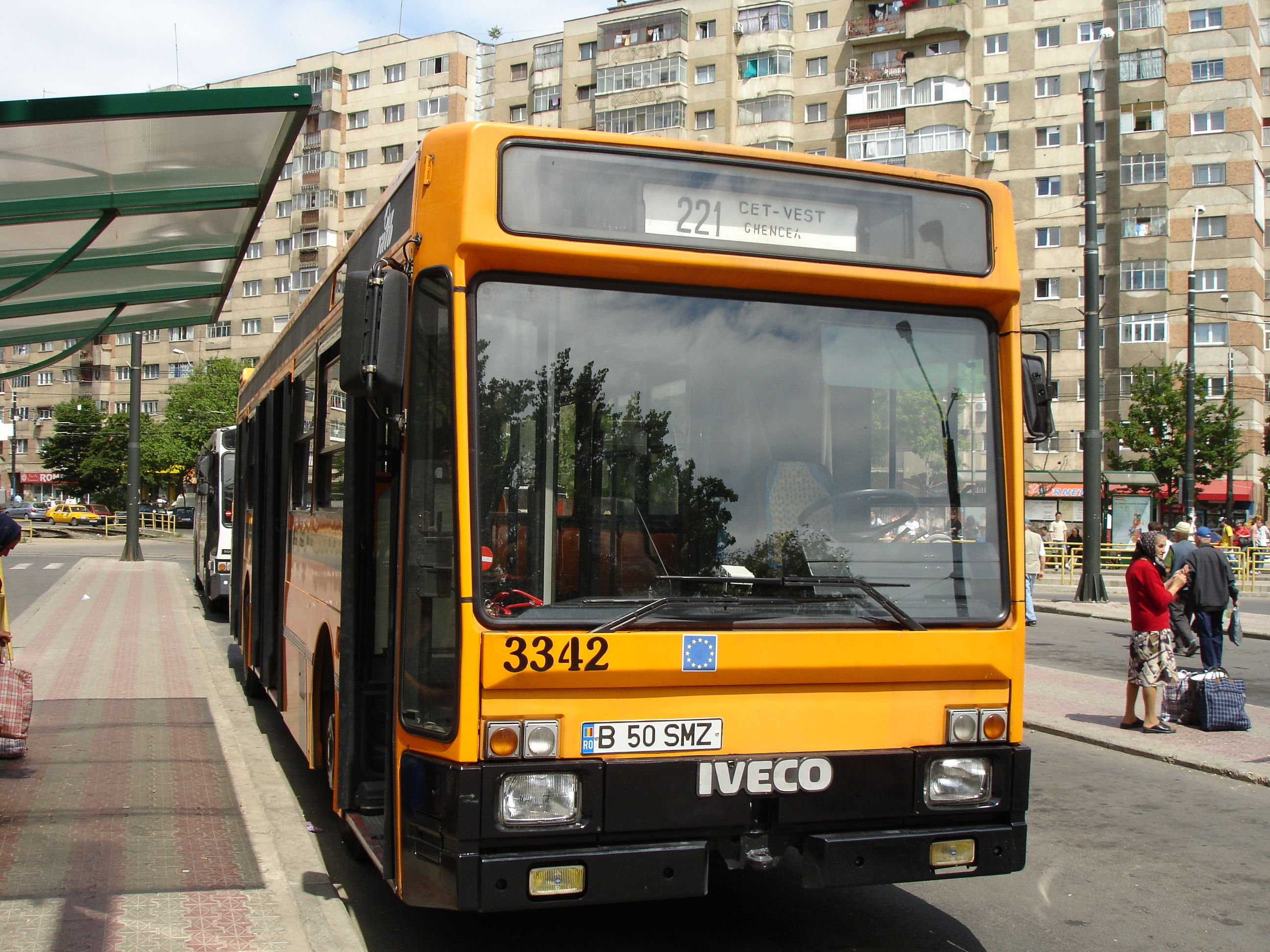

Overview
- Manufacturer: Iveco

Body and chassis
- Floor type: Step entrance

Dimensions
- Length: 10.5 m (34.4 ft); 12 m (39.4 ft); 18 m (59.1 ft)
- Width: 2.5 m (8.2 ft)
- Height: 3.23 m (10.6 ft)
- Curb weight: 10,500 kg (23,100 lb); 113,500 kg (250,200 lb)

Chronology
- Successor: Iveco Turbocity

The Iveco Effeuno is a class of Italian buses built between 1984 and 1989 by Iveco. They consisted of three different models with different internal arrangements: Iveco 471 for urban services, Iveco 571 for suburban services, and Iveco 671 for interurban services.

Engines were, for the urban version, a Fiat 8220.12, with 9572 cc and 203 HP, with an automatic transmission which could be chosen between Voith D851, ZF 4HP-500 or DB. The interurban and articulated version had a turbocharged Iveco with 9570 cc and 240 HP, with a ZF 5HP-500 automatic transmission.

The buses were provided with two different chassis lengths, depending on the sub-manufacturer chosen by the customer: 10.5 m and 12 m. There was also an articulated version with a length of 18 m.

The bus was in service with numerous public transport companies in Italy, the first unit having been decommissioned starting from the 1990s-early 2000s.

The series was replaced by the similar Iveco 480 class.
