= TPER =

Public company

Trasporto Passeggeri Emilia-Romagna
- Type: Società per azioni
- Predecessor: ATC
- Founded: Bologna, Italy
- Headquarters: Bologna, Italy
- Area served: Emilia-Romagna
- Services: Bus-line operation
- Number of employees: 2,500 (2019)
- Website: tper.it

Trasporto Passeggeri Emilia-Romagna (TPER, Italian for Emilia-Romagna passenger transportation) is a public company overseeing public transportation in the Metropolitan City of Bologna, in the province of Ferrara and in parts of the provinces of Modena and Ravenna, Italy.

It owns part of Trenitalia Tper, which operates train services in the wider Emilia-Romagna region, on railway lines overseen by both Rete Ferroviaria Italiana and Ferrovie Emilia Romagna.

== History ==
The current company was born on 1 February 2012 from the merger of the transport division of ATC, which at that time operated public transportation services in the Bologna and Ferrara basins, with the transport division of Ferrovie Emilia Romagna (FER).

In the early months of 2014, the company became the reference shareholder of SETA, a company that provides local public transportation services by road in the provinces of Modena, Reggio Emilia and Piacenza.

As of December 2014, TPER holds shareholdings in 13 companies, mainly operating in the passenger and freight transport sector.

== Company structure ==
The share capital is divided as follows among the various public bodies of Emilia-Romagna and 3 provinces of Lombardia:

- Emilia-Romagna Region: 46.13%;
- Municipality of Bologna: 30.10%;
- Metropolitan City of Bologna: 18.78%;
- ACT Reggio Emilia: 3.60%;
- Province of Ferrara: 1.01%;
- Municipality of Ferrara: 0.65%;
- Province of Parma: 0.04%;
- Province of Reggio Emilia: 0.04%;
- Province of Modena: 0.04%;
- Ravenna Holding Spa: 0.04%;
- Province of Rimini: 0.04%;
- Province of Mantova: 0.0132%;
- Province of Lodi: 0.0132%;
- Metropolitan City of Milan: 0.0136%

== Services ==
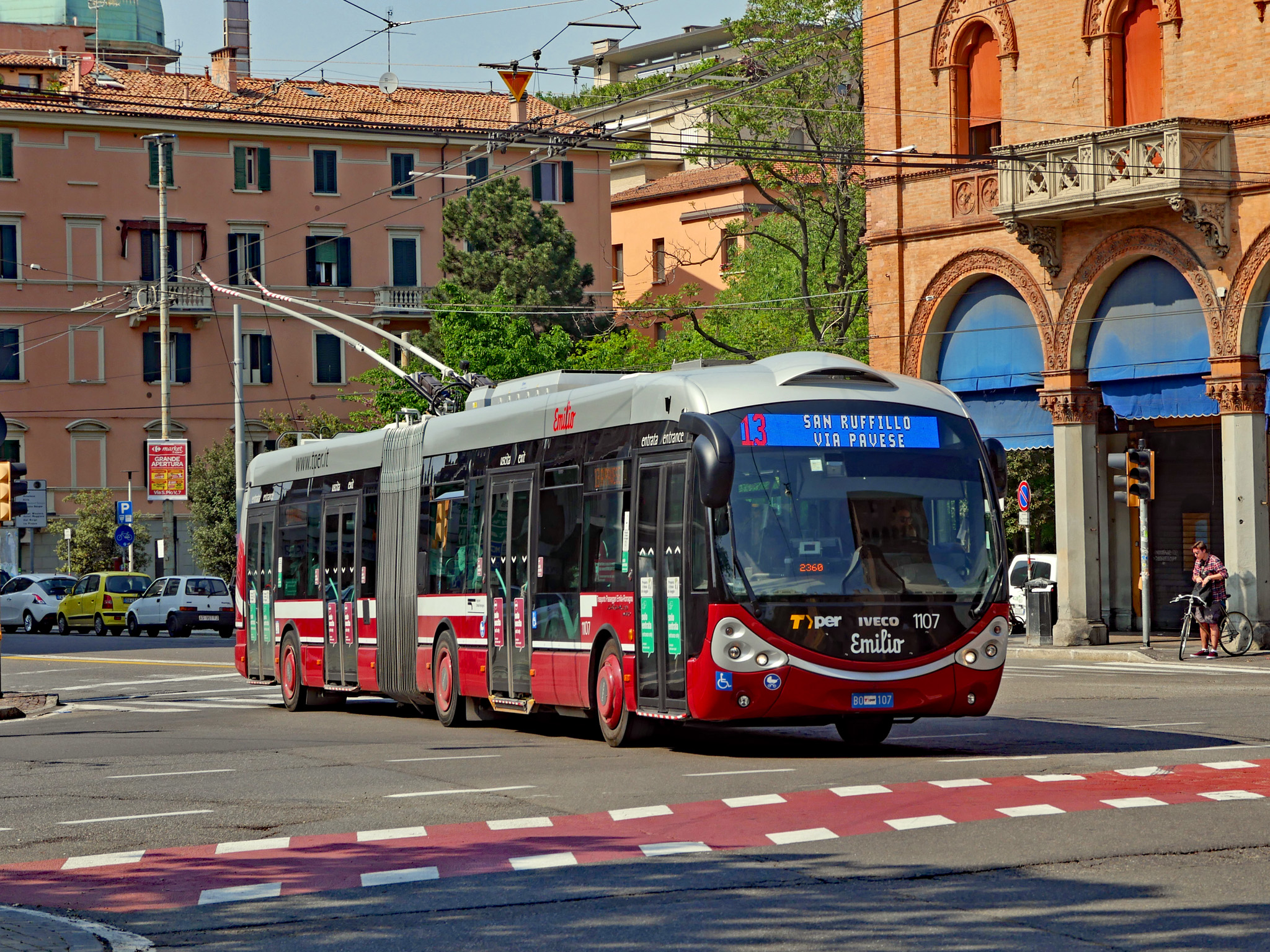
Trolleybus Iveco Crealis (Emilio) serving on line 13, part of Bologna trolleybus network

- Urban bus lines in Bologna, Ferrara, Imola
- Suburban bus lines in the Metropolitan City of Bologna, province of Ferrara, province of Modena, province of Ravenna
- Parking management in Bologna and Imola
- Car sharing service Corrente in Bologna, Rimini, Ferrara and Casalecchio di Reno
- Bike sharing service in Bologna and Imola

== Current fleet ==
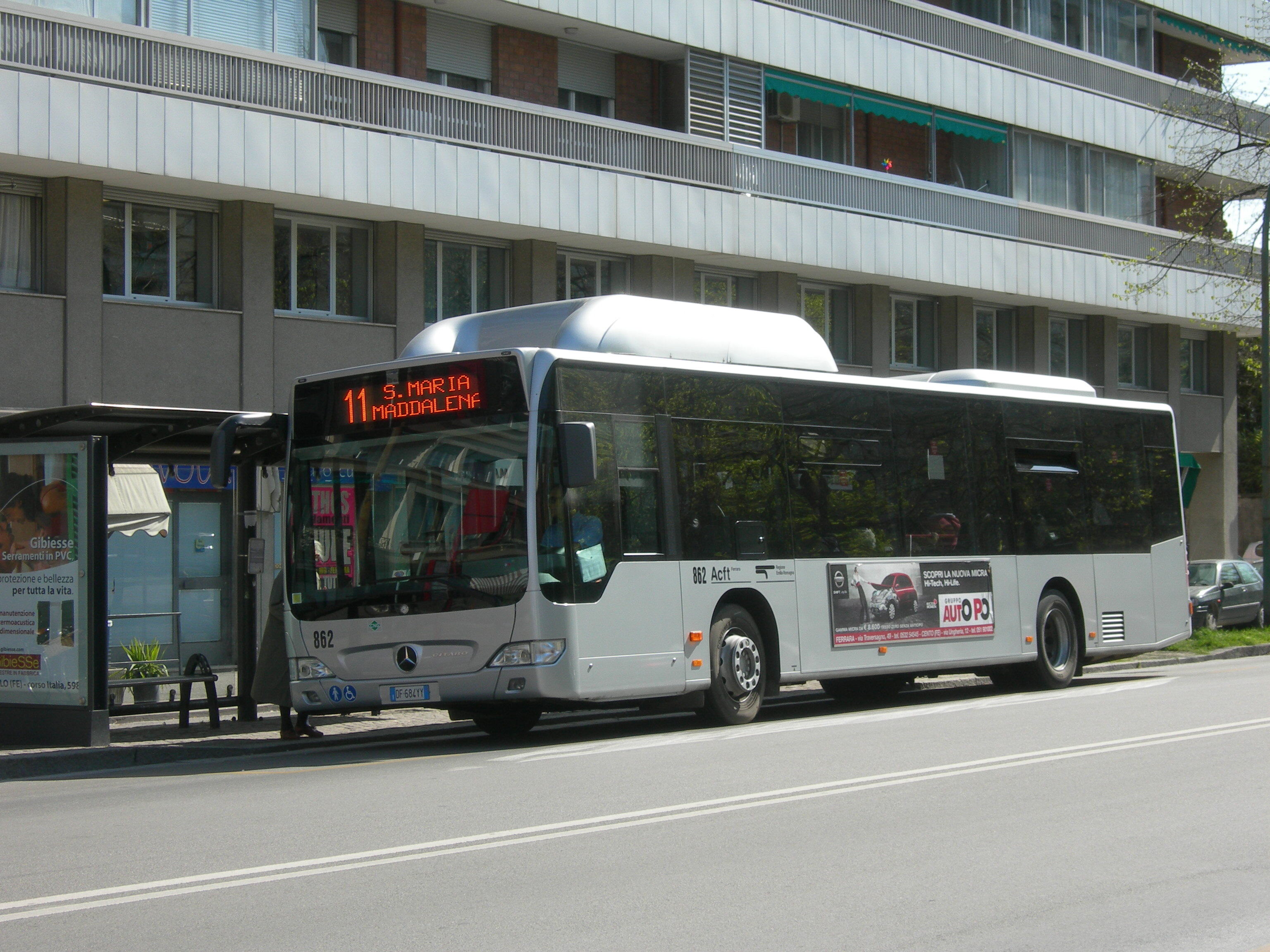
Bus in Ferrara

The bus fleet inherited from ATC consists of 1200 vehicles.

The fleet circulating in Bologna is composed of: Mercedes-Benz Citaro, Mercedes-Benz Cito, Mercedes-Benz Integro, Mercedes-Benz Sprinter, Iveco CityClass, Irisbus Citelis, Iveco Bus Urbanway, Iveco Crossway, Iveco Crealis Neo, Iveco Daily Way, BredaMenarinibus Monocar 240, BredaMenarinibus Zeus, BredaMenarinibus Vivacity, BredaMenarinibus Avancity, BredaMenarinibus Citymood, Autodromo (CAM) BusOtto, Autodromo Alè, Setra S 419 UL, Volvo 7700, MAN Lion's City, Neoplan Centroliner, Van Hool A300, Solaris Trollino, Solaris Urbino.

=== Urban Fleet ===
==== Minibuses ====
- 2306-2310 Mercedes-Benz O413 Sprinter
- 2311-2316 Iveco 70C14 CNG Sitcar Cititour
- 2317-2323 Mercedes 516 CDI Sprinter Atlas Cityline (formerly of Kautra, Kaunas (LT))
- 2144-2416 BMB M 200 E ZEUS
- 9640-9643 Mercedes O416 CDI Sprinter
- 9644 Iveco 50C14 CNG

==== Buses and midbuses ====
- 2503, 2505, 2506, 2509, 2514, and 2515 MAN T154 Autodromo (CAM) Alè
- 2517, 2519 and 2522 MAN T154 Autodromo Alè (formerly 230 of Conerobus Ancona (2517); 51 and 52 of GTT (2519 and 2518 respectively); and 1233, 1243, and 1244 of SETA Modena (2520, 2521, and 2522 respectively))
- 2523-2533 Rampini Alè (2523 was a demonstrative vehicle of Rampini, while the number 2532 and 2533 were purchased from Trieste Trasporti)
- 2551-2555 BMB M231 CU CNG Vivacity
- 2610-2615 Mercedes-Benz O520 Cito 8.9 m
- 2616-2618 Mercedes-Benz O520 Cito 9.6 m
- 2619-2622 Mercedes-Benz O520 Cito 8 m
- 2623-2625 Mercedes-Benz O520 Cito 8.9 m
- 2629-2631 BMB M240 EN Altereco
- 2632-2639 BMB M240 EL Altereco
- 2640-2641 VanHool A330 Hybrid
- 2645-2649 and 2653 Mercedes-Benz O520 Cito 9.6 m (purchased from LINE Lodi and TEP Parma)
- 2654-2655 Mercedes-Benz O520 Cito 8.9 m (purchased from Dolomitibus)
- 2656-2667 MAN A37H Lion's City Hybrid
- 2911-2915 BredaMenarinibus BMB M230/1 MU
- 5324 and 5330 Iveco 491E.12.22 CityClass 4 doors
- 5333-5334, 5339-5341, 5343-5345, 5347-5353, 5355-5356, 5358, 5361-5363, 5365-5369, 5371-5373, 5375, 5377-5381 Iveco 491E.12.22 CityClass 3 doors
- 5502-5510 BMB M240 LU CNG 3 doors
- 5511-5531 Irisbus 491E.12.27 CNG CityClass
- 5532-5535 Irisbus 491E.12.24 CNG CityClass
- 5536-5545 BMB M240 LU CNG 3 doors
- 5546-5565 BMB M240 LU CNG 4 doors
- 5566-5575 Irisbus 491E.12.27 CNG CityClass
- 5576 BMB M240 NU CNG
- 5577-5598 BMB M240 LU CNG Avancity 4 doors
- 5599-5610 Irisbus Citelis 12 CNG
- 5611-5365 Menarini Bus 250 Citymood 12 CNG IIA
- 5636-5666 Menarini Bus 250 Citymood 12 LNG IIA
- 5667-5672 MAN Lion's City Hybrid CNG
- 5673-5691 Mercedes-Benz O530 NU Citaro Facelift 3 doors (purchased from Trieste Trasporti)
- 5692-5725 MAN Lion's City Hybrid CNG
- 5726-5735 Menarini Bus 250 Citymood 12 LNG IIA
- 9045 Mercedes-Benz O530 N Citaro 3 doors
- 9444-9449 Iveco 200E.9.15 Cacciamali EuroPolis
- 9450-9455 Iveco 200E.10.20 Cacciamali EuroPolis
- 9800-9806 Iveco 491E.10.24 CNG CityClass
- 9850-9855 Iveco 491E.12.24 CNG CityClass
- 9856-9867 Mercedes-Benz O530 N3 Citaro

==== Bendy Buses ====
- 6031-6035 Neoplan N4522/3 Centroliner (formerly of TL Lausanne (CH))
- 6036-6050 Mercedes-Benz O530G Citaro Facelift 4 doors (formerly of Trieste Trasporti)
- 6400-6408 Iveco Urbanway 18 Hybrid
- 6501-6509 and 6511-6514 BMB M340 U CNG
- 6515-6520 MAN A23 NG 313 CNG
- 6521-6532 MAN A23 Lion's City CNG
- 6533-6553 Mercedes-Benz O530 G3 Citaro CNG
- 6554-6564 BMB M350S CNG Avancity Plus
- 6565-6578 MAN A40 Lion's City CNG 4 doors
- 6579-6584 MAN A40 Lion's City CNG 3 doors

=== Suburban and Interurban Fleet ===
==== Minibuses ====
- 826 Mercedes O413 Sprinter
- 830 Mercedes 518CDI Sprinter (formerly of the SACA Bus consortium (owned by Zuccarini))
- 831 Mercedes O515 U (formerly of the SACA BUS consortium (owned by Zuccarini))
- 832-834 Irisbus Daily A50/E4/20/B (formerly of SEAL La Spezia)
- 9600, 9605-9606, 9608-9611 Iveco A45.12 TurboDaily
- 9620 Iveco A50C13/L19
- 9621 Iveco A50/E4/21/B
- 9622-9624 Iveco A50C18

==== Buses ====
- 370, 373-375, 377, and 379 Iveco 393.12.35 MyWay
- 383-384, 386, and 388-393 Mercedes-Benz Integro
- 395-397, and 399-400 Irisbus SFR160 Arway 12
- 727-735 and 737 Mercedes O404.10 RHA
- 738-739, and 742 Iveco 100E21 Eurocargo Midi Cacciamali
- 743-744, 748-750, 752, and 755 Mercedes-Benz Tourino
- 756 Autosan Gemini (purchased in 2018)
- 1301-1307 and 1309-1318 Irisbus 399E.12.35 MyWay
- 1319-1323 Mercedes-Benz O550 LÜ
- 1324-1327, 1329-1347, and 1351-1356 Setra S 417 UL
- 1357-1359 Irisbus SFR141 Arway
- 1360-1366 MAN Lion's Regio 14
- 1367-1379 Mercedes-Benz O530 LÜ 3 axes
- 1401, 1410, 1416-1418, 1420-1429, 1431-1432, and 1434-1438 Mercedes-Benz O530 NÜ Citaro
- 1441, 1443, and 1445 Mercedes-Benz O530 NÜ 3 axes, 15 m
- 1446-1493 Iveco Bus Crossway LE
- 1501-1522, and 1530-1531 Mercedes-Benz O530 N1 Citaro
- 1532-1543 Mercedes-Benz O530 N2 Citaro
- 1544-1553 Mercedes-Benz O530 N3 Citaro 3 doors
- 1554-1568, and 1570-1572 Mercedes-Benz O530 N3 Citaro 2 doors
- 1573-1576 BMB M240 LU CNG Avancity+
- 1581-1587 BMB M240 LS CNG
- 1588-1590 Mercedes-Benz O550 Integro (formerly of Tide Buss, Bergen (NO))
- 1591-1620 Mercedes-Benz O530 N3 Citaro 2 doors
- 1621-1634 Mercedes-Benz O530 N3 CNG
- 1635-1642 MAN A21 Lion's City CNG
- 1643-1662 Menarini Bus 250 Citymood 12 IIA
- 1663-1664 and 1670 MAN A21 NL243 Lion's City CNG (formerly of Helsingin Bussiliikenne, Helsinki (FIN))
- 1665-1668 Mercedes Benz O530 NÜ Citaro Facelift (formerly of Kroiss, Rosenheim (DE) (1665-1667); and Stadtverkehr Friedrichshafen (DE) (1668))
- 1669 Mercedes-Benz Conecto LF (formerly a demonstration vehicle in Frankfurt (DE))
- 1671-1676 Mercedes-Benz O530 NÜ Citaro (formerly Stadtverkehr Konstanz (DE)
- 1677 Mercedes-Benz O530 NÜ Citaro Facelift (formerly of Stadtbus Chur (CH))
- 1678-1682 MAN A21 NL 313 Lion's City (formerly of STI Thun (CH))
- 1683-1686 MAN A21 NL 313 CNG 2 doors (formerly of TICE Esch-sur-Alzette (LUX))
- 1687-1688 Mercedes-Benz O530 K Citaro New (formerly of Nettbus Oslo (NO))
- 2700-2728 Mercedes-Benz O530 Citaro C2 Hybrid, 2 doors
- 3200-3214 Scania Interlink LNG
- 3215-3222 MAN Lion's Intercity
- 4200-4219 Iveco Bus Crossway 12 LE
- 8659 Cacciamali TCI Sigma 10 IN.47.24 (formerly of Ferrovie Emilia Romagna)
- 8812-8813 Irisbus 397E.12.35 Orlandi 2001 (formerly of Ferrovie Emilia Romagna)
- 8866 Iveco 680E.12.26 TurboCity-I (formerly of Ferrovie Emilia Romagna, and of Autoguidovie Italiane (2012-2013))
- 8903-8904 and 8916 Iveco 393E.12.35 MyWay (formerly of Ferrovie Emilia Romagna)
- 8920, 8929-8930, 8932, and 8940 Irisbus 399E.12.35 MyWay
- 9060-9072 Mercedes-Benz O530 N1 Citaro
- 9073-9074 Irisbus 591E.12.24 CNG CityClass 2 doors
- 9101-9105 and 9107-9109 Iveco 393E.12.35 MyWay
- 9250-9254 and 9256-9264 MAN A01 UL 313 Regional CAM I.2000.12
- 9307-9310, 9312, and 9314-9328 Irisbus 399E.12.35 MyWay
- 9514 Mercedes-Benz O550 N Integro
- 9515 MAN SU 313
- 9516-9519 Irisbus 389E.12.35 EuroClass

==== Articulated buses ====
- 901-902 VanHool AG300S
- 926-927 and 929-937 VanHool AG300S
- 938-947 Mercedes Benz O530 GN Citaro 4 doors
- 948-968 Volvo B9LA CNG Säffle (formerly of Keolis Stockholm (SE))
- 969 Volvo B7LA (formerly of Autopostale (CH))
- 970-973 Mercedes-Benz O530 GN Citaro 3 doors (formerly of SWM Münster (DE) (970-971); SWH Heilbronn (DE) (972); and AAGL Liestal (CH) (973))
- 974-990 Iveco Urbanway 18 3 doors
- 991-993 Mercedes-Benz O530 GN Citaro Facelift CNG 3 doors (purchased from abroad, yet to enter service)
- 1801-1825 Mercedes-Benz O530 GNU Citaro
- 1826-1828 Mercedes-Benz O530 GNU Citaro Facelift
- 1829-1831 Mercedes-Benz O530 GNU Citaro (formerly of VHH Hamburg (DE))
- 1832-1835 Menarini Bus 360 Citymood 18 IIA
- 8997 Solaris Urbino 18 (formerly of Ferrovie Emilia Romagna)
- 9051 VanHool AG300S
- 9054-9056 Mercedes-Benz O530 GN Citaro

=== Trolleybuses ===
- 1021-1023 and 1025-1040 MAN NGT 204F Autodromo BusOtto (nicknamed Bologna 1 series)
- 1041-1055 MAN NGT 204F ABB Autodromo BusOtto (nicknamed Bologna 2 series)
- 1056-1066 Solaris Trollino 18
- 1101-1149 Irisbus Crealis Neo 18 (nicknamed "Emilio" by a group of primary schoolchildren who won the naming competition for this bus, promoted by TPER).

== Deposits ==
TPER operates three bus depots (garages) in Bologna (Battindarno depot, Due Madonne depot and Ferrarese depot), one in Imola (BO), one in Prati di Castel di Casio (BO) (upper Reno valley), one in Ferrara (Trenti deposit) and one in Comacchio (FE). Moreover, several proprietary car parks are scattered in the area managed by the company, along the main suburban and extra-urban lines.

TPER has also inherited three railway depots from FER: Bologna Roveri, Ferrara Porta Reno (now closed) and Rimini Clementini, which then was ceded to START Romagna together with its bus services. The Rimini Clementini depot was soon after turned into a car park

== Rolling Stock ==
=== Electric Trainsets ===
These are now part of the Trenitalia-Tper service basin.

- 001-002 ALe 088 FIREMA trainsets
- 001-002 Le 088 FIREMA semi-pilot coaches
- 001 Le 096 FIREMA coach
- ALe 054 trainsets (4 trainsets, 2 formerly of the Ferrovia Bologna-Vignola, 2 formerly of SNCB)
- ALe 228 trainsets (formerly of SNCB and ACTM Modena)
- 001-004 ALe 122 Ansaldo/Casaralta
- 001-012 and 101-114 ETR350 Stadler Rail/Ansaldo
- 001 and 006 ETR 243 ALFA 2 TFA Titagarh FIREMA Adler (on loan from EAV Naples)

=== Electric Locomotives ===
- E.464.901-906 and E.464.890-893 (ABB Bombardier)

=== Carriages ===
- Corifer Vivalto semi-pilot coaches, and regular coaches

=== Diesel Trainsets ===
- 013-018 Fiat Ferroviaria ALn 668 (formerly of Ferrovia Ferrara-Suzzara and Ferrovie Emilia Romagna)
- 019-021 Fiat Ferroviaria ALn 663 (formerly of Ferrovia Ferrara-Suzzara and Ferrovie Emilia Romagna)
- 026-037 ATRIBO ATR 220 (built by Pojazdy Szynowe Pesa Bydgoszcz)
- 067-082 Fiat Ferroviaria ALn 067-082 (formerly of ACT Reggio Emilia)
- 101 and 103-105 Fiat Ferroviaria ALn 663 (formerly of Ferrovia Bologna-Portomaggiore and Ferrovie Emilia Romagna)
- 601-602 Fiat Ferroviaria ALn 668 (formerly of Ferrovia Suzzara-Parma)
- 611-613 Fiat Ferroviaria ALn 668 (formerly of Ferrovia Suzzara-Parma)
- 903 Fiat Ferroviaria ALn 663 (formerly of Ferrovia Suzzara-Parma and Ferrovie Emilia Romagna)
- 1008-1009 Fiat Ferroviaria ALn 668 (formerly of Ferrovie Padane and Ferrovie Emilia Romagna)
- 1010-1013 Fiat Ferroviaria ALn 668 (formerly of Ferrovie Padane and Ferrovie Emilia Romagna)
- 1014-1015 Fiat Ferroviaria ALn 668 (formerly of Ferrovie Padane and Ferrovie Emilia Romagna)
- 1016-1021 Fiat Ferroviaria ALn 663 (formerly of Ferrovie Padane and Ferrovie Emilia Romagna)
- 2463-2466 Fiat Ferroviaria ALn 668 (formerly of ACT Reggio Emilia)

=== Pilot Carriages for Diesel Trainsets ===
- 031-038 Fiat Ferroviaria Ln 880 (formerly of Ferrovia Ferrara-Suzzara and Ferrovie Emilia Romagna)
- 306-313 Fiat Ferroviaria Ln 880 (formerly of Ferrovie Padane and Ferrovie Emilia Romagna)
- 371 Fiat Ferroviaria Ln 880 (formerly of Ferrovia Suzzara-Parma and Ferrovie Emilia Romagna)
- 377 Fiat Ferroviaria Ln 778 (formerly of Ferrovia Suzzara-Parma and Ferrovie Emilia Romagna)
- 401-404 Fiat Ferroviaria Ln 778 (formerly of Ferrovia Bologna-Portomaggiore and Ferrovie Emilia Romagna)

== Former fleet ==
These vehicles have been withdrawn by TPER from service due to various reasons.

=== Urban minibuses ===
- 2411, 2414, and 2146 Bredamenarinibus M200E Zeus (2411 withdrawn in 2022, 2414 and 2416 in 2023).
- 2213 Fiat A 49.10 TurboDaily Autodromo (CAM) Pollicino 35p (withdrawn in 2012, it was the only surviving bus of the 2201-2213 series, since the others were withdrawn by ATC)
- 2214-2218 Fiat A 49.10.1 TurboDaily Autodromo Pollicino 35p (withdrawn in 2012)
- 2306 and 2310 Mercedes-Benz O413 Sprinter (withdrawn in 2022/23
- 2403, 2406, and 2408 Iveco 291E.7.11 Autodromo DownTown (withdrawn in 2012, these buses were the only surviving ones of the 2401-2410 series, with the others having been withdrawn by ATC)

=== Urban buses and midibuses ===
- 2501-2502, 2504, 2507, 2509-2513, and 2516 MAN T154 Autodromo Alè (2513 was withdrawn in 2013 due to a fire, while the rest were stopped between 2018-2020)
- 2518, 2521, and 2522 (2518 has been withdrawn in 2015 due to a fire, while 2521 and 2522 have been stopped in 2020)
- 2601-2609, 2626-2628, 2642-2643 MAN T154 Autodromo Hybrid (withdrawn in 2017)
- 2644 Mercedes-Benz O520 Cito 9.6 m (ceded to a private operator)
- 2901-2915 BMB M230/1 U (withdrawn between 2016 and 2019, n. 2911 has been preserved by Storicbus)
- 2916-2921 Cacciamali TCM890 (withdrawn between 2016 and 2019)
- 5201-5246 Iveco 480.12.21 Turbocity-U (numbers 5227, 5229, 5230, 5236, and 5245 withdrawn in 2004 by ATC, the rest were completely withdrawn in the following years, with 5203 withdrawn in 2017. Originally preserved by Associazione Milanese Bus Storici, 5203 was however demolished, like the rest of the buses in this series)
- 5301-5310 MAN NL 202 F Autodromo (CAM) BusOtto
- 5247-5267 Iveco 490.12.22 Turbocity-UR (withdrawn between 2016 and 2018)
- 5311-5320 BMB M221/1 LU (withdrawn between 2012 and 2018)
- 5321-5331 Iveco 491E.12.22 CityClass 4 doors (withdrawn between 2013 and 2021)
- 5332-5381 Iveco 491E.12.22 CityClass 3 doors
  - (5342, 5360, and 5364 were withdrawn for a fire in 2013, 2015 and 2017)
  - (the rest were withdrawn between 2017 and 2021)
  - Number 5363 is preserved by Passione Bus in Milan.
- 5501, 5502 BredaMenariniBus M240LU CNG (both withdrawn due to fires in 2016 and 2025 respectively)
- 5503, 5505, 5506, 5507, 5509 (withdrawn between 2025-26, 5509 was withdrawn after an accident on the 17th March 2026 in San Lazzaro di Savena).
- 5532-5535 Irisbus CityClass 491E.12.24 CNG (all withdrawn by 2025).
- 5536-5544 BredaMenariniBus M240 LU CNG 3 doors (withdrawn by 2026, n. 5545 is still in service).
- 5550 BredaMenariniBus M240 LU CNG 4 doors (withdrawn in 2026).
- 5566-5575 Irisbus 491E.12.27 Cityclass CNG (withdrawn in May and June 2026).
- 5576 BredaMenariniBus M240 NU CNG (withdrawn in 2026)
- 9044 MAN NU 263-5 (withdrawn in 2017)
- 9430-9439 and 9443 Iveco 200E.9.15 Cacciamali EuroPolis (9430-9436 and 9439 demolished, 9437 ceded to the Ferrara Fire Department)
- 9456 Cacciamali TCC 760 CAU (demolished)
- 9457 Irisbus 203E.9.27 CNG EuroPolis
- 9709-9712 Iveco 200EEY.7 EuroPolis (withdrawn)
- 9713-9716 EPT Horus (withdrawn in 2015, but stopped before then due to a lack of spare parts, it is unknown what happened to them after 2015)

=== Urban Bendy Buses ===
- 6001-6016 Iveco 490.18.29 TurboCity-UR (withdrawn in 2018 from TPER, the vehicles 6002, 6012, and 6016 were sold to SETA Modena, where they are still active and were re-numbered from 225 to 227)
- 6017-6028 BMB M321/1 U (all withdrawn between 2012 and 2019 and since then demolished)
- 6029-6030 Neoplan N4421 Centroliner (formerly of Chur (CH) they were withdrawn in 2019 and demolished in 2020)
- 6501-6506, 6508-6512 BMB M340 U CNG (6510 waswithdrawn due to a fire)
- 6531 MAN A23 Lion's City CNG (withdrawn in April 2023 due to a fire whilst returning to its depot).
- 6536 Mercedes-Benz O530G Citaro CNG (Withdrawn due to a fire).

=== Suburban and Interurban Buses ===
==== Minibuses ====
- 60 Iveco A45.10.1 (withdrawn)
- 801-820 Iveco 59E12 Carvin
  - No. 804 was sold to Giacomo Tours in Vallo della Lucania in 2014
  - No. 806, 807, 813, and 820 were sold to CO.E.R.BUS joint-venture in Imola in 2014, respectively to Canè (807 and 820), Europa Bus (806), and Santerno Bus (813) in 2014. Today they have been withdrawn from these companies too.
  - No. 808 and 819 were sold to Ricci Bus in 2014.
  - The rest were withdrawn
- 821-825 and 827-829 Mercedes-Benz O413 Sprinter (all sold)
  - 823 was sold to Canè (as part of CO.E.R.BUS) in Imola in 2014
  - The others were also sold to other private operators under the SACA BUS and COSEPURI ventures.
- 9601-9604, 9607, and 9612-9615 Iveco TurboDaily A50C13L19 (either withdrawn or sold)
- 9616-9618 Iveco TurboDaily A45.10 (withdrawn)
- 9619 Iveco TurboDaily A45.12/P (withdrawn)

==== Buses ====
- 52, 62, and 64 Setra S228 DT (withdrawn)
- 53, 61, 63, and 65-66 Setra S210 H (withdrawn)
- 54-56 and 58 Setra S211 HD (withdrawn)
- 57 Setra S216 HDS (withdrawn)
- 59 Setra S210 HD (withdrawn)
- 67 Setra S211 H (withdrawn)
- 349-353 Iveco 370S.12.30 Autodromo I80 (349, 350 and 351 withdrawn, 352 and 353 sold to an unspecified private operator)
- 354-363 Iveco 370S.12.30 (all withdrawn, 354 was sold to Gino Tour, a member of CO.E.R.BUS in 2014, recently withdrawn)
- 364-369 MAN A01 UL 313 Regional Autodromo I.2000.12
  - 365 and 366 were sold to Ricci Bus, a member of CO.E.R.BUS, in 2014 and renumbered 2441 and 2442 respectively
  - 368 was sold to Società Servizi Trasporti Ferrara in 2014
  - 364 and 367 were sold to unspecified operators
  - 369 was sold to COSEPURI and recently withdrawn
- 371, 372, 376, 380 381, and 382 Iveco 393.12.35 MyWay
  - 371 was sold to COSEPURI in 2014
  - 372 was sold to Società Servizi Trasporti Ferrara
  - 376, 378 and 380 were all sold to Autoguidovie Italiane
  - 381 and 382 were both ceded to Santerno Bus, a member of CO.E.R.BUS, in 2014
- 385, 387, and 394 Mercedes-Benz Integro
  - 385 was sold to Ricci Bus, a member of CO.E.R.BUS in 2014, and renumbered 2237
  - 387 was sold to SACA Bus in 2014
  - 394 was sold to Zaganelli e Ravaglia, a member of CO.E.R.BUS., of Lugo di Romagna in 2014, and renumbered 2250
- 398 Irisbus RF260 Arway (withdrawn in 2012 due to a fire)
- 432-440, 472, 474, 478, 482-484 Iveco 671.12.24 Effeuno (withdrawn)
  - 432 was sold to Zaganelli e Ravaglia, a member of CO.E.R.BUS of Lugo di Romagna, renumbered 2251 and recently was demolished
  - 440 was sold to Pollini of Conselice, a member of CO.E.R.BUS, renumbered 2251 and recently demolished
- 443-471 Menarini M201/2 SLI (withdrawn)
  - 443 and 462 were sold to Pollini of Conselice, a member of CO.E.R.BUS, renumbered 2231 and 2232, and recently demolished.
  - 448 and 450 were sold to Ricci Bus, a member of CO.E.R.BUS, renumbered 2238 and 2239, and recently demolished
  - 471 was sold to COSEPURI
- 486-500 Menarini M201/2 SLI (withdrawn)
  - 498 sold to Ricci Bus, a member of CO.E.R.BUS, renumbered 2240 and demolished recently
- 655-675 BMB M220 LS (withdrawn, those vehicles which have been sold are no longer fit for service)
  - 665 was withdrawn back in 1996 due to an arson attack
  - 655, 659-660, and 662 were sold to SACA Bus in 2014
  - 656 and 664 were sold to Ricci Bus, a member of COSEPURI, in 2014
  - 661 was sold to Flybus Cortina Express, a member of COSEPURI, in 2014
- 676-685 and 687-696 Mercedes-Benz O405 N2 (withdrawn)
  - 678 and 680 were withdrawn
  - 676, 678-680, 683-684, and 689 were sold to COSEPURI
  - 685 was sold to SACA Bus
  - 677 and 696 were sold to SEAL La Spezia and renumbered 1677 and 1696
- 697-700 MAN NL262 FS Autodromo (CAM) BusOtto (withdrawn in November 2020 following the withdrawal of route BLQ)
- 701-702 MAN NL263 FS Autodromo (CAM) BusOtto, New (withdrawn in November 2020 following the withdrawal of route BLQ)
- 736 Mercedes-Benz O404.10 RHA (sold to ATAM Reggio Calabria)
- 740-741, 743-754 Mercedes O510 Tourino
  - 740 and 741 Iveco 100E.21 Eurocargo Midi Cacciamali (sold to COSEPURI)
  - 743 and 744 were sold to Società Servizi Trasporti in 2014
  - 745-747 and 753 were sold to SACA Bus
  - 751 and 754 were sold to ATAM Reggio Calabria and renumbered 413 and 414
- 853 Iveco 315.8.17 (demolished)
- 1308 Irisbus 399E.12.35 MyWay (sold to Zaganelli e Ravaglia, a member of CO.E.R.BUS, in Lugo)
- 1328, 1348-1350 Setra S417 UL
  - 1328 was sold to Gamberini of Ravenna
  - 1348-1350 were sold to COSEPURI
- 1402-1403, 1407-1409, 1411, 1413-1415, 1419, 1430, 1433, and 1439-1440 Mercedes-Benz O530 NÜ Citaro
  - 1402 and 1403 were sold to SEAL La Spezia in 2014
  - 1408, 1409, 1410, 1419, and 1433 have been sold to Ricci Bus, a member of COSEPURI, in 2014
  - 1411 was sold to B&B of Savigno, a member of COSEPURI
  - 1413 and 1414 have been withdrawn due to a fire
  - 1430 has been sold to Canè of Imola, a member of CO.E.R.BUS, and renumbered 2228
  - 1439 and 1440 have been sold to Santerno Bus, a member of CO.E.R.BUS, and renumbered 2229 and 2230
- 1404-1406 MAN NL283 Autodromo (CAM) BusOtto New
  - 1404 was sold to Gino Tour, a member of COSEPURI, in 2014
  - 1405 was withdrawn
  - 1406 was sold to Ricci Bus, a member of COSEPURI, in 2014
- 1442 and 1444 Mercedes-Benz O530 NÜ Citaro 3 axes
  - 1442 was sold to Ricci Bus, a member of COSEPURI, in 2014
  - 1444 was withdrawn in 2018 due to an arson attack which destroyed it in Castelfranco Emilia
- 1523-1529 Mercedes-Benz O530 N1 Citaro
  - 1523-1525 were sold to SACA Bus in 2014
  - 1526-1529, originally sold to SACA Bus in 2014, were sold later on to SEAL La Spezia
- 1569 Mercedes-Benz O530 N3 Citaro (withdrawn due to a fire)
- 8601-8606 Iveco 380E.12.35 Euroclass (demolished)
- 8656-8657 Cacciamali TCI 9.72 (sold to START Romagna in 2012)
- 8658 and 8660 Cacciamali TCI Sigma 10 IN47.24 (sold to START Romagna in 2012)
- 8722-8731 Iveco 370.12.L25
  - 8723, 8725, and 8728 withdrawn by TPER
  - 8722, 8724, 8726-8727, 8729-8731 were sold to START Romagna in 2012, and withdrawn later on
- 8732-8733 Iveco 370.12.30 Dallavia (sold to START Romagna in 2012)
- 8735-8738 Iveco 370.12.30
  - 8735 withdrawn by TPER
  - 8736-8738 sold to START Romagna in 2012 and withdrawn later on
- 8739-8740 Iveco 370S.12.30 (all withdrawn)
- 8751-8753 Iveco 370.12.25
  - 8751 and 8752 were withdrawn
  - 8753 was sold to START Romagna in 2012
- 8754 Mercedes-Benz O303 Garbarini (withdrawn)
- 8755 Setra S210 H (withdrawn)
- 8804 Fiat 370S.12.35H Orlandi Domino GT (withdrawn)
- 8811 Irisbus 397E.12.35 Orlandi (sold to START Romagna in 2012 and renumbered 35114, for the START Away hiring services)
- 8854 Iveco 671.12.24 I-Effeuno (withdrawn)
- 8855-8861 Menarini M201/2 SLI (withdrawn between 2012 and 2017)
- 8862-8866 and 8867 Iveco 680E.12.26 TurboCity-I (withdrawn between 2013 and 2020)
- 8901-8902 Iveco 391E.12.29 Eurorider Dallavia (originally sold to Autoguidovie in 2012, they returned to TPER in 2016)
  - 8901 was withdrawn by TPER
  - 8902 was sold to Pollini of Conselice, a member of CO.E.R.BUS
- 8905-8915 Ivveco 393E.12.35 MyWay
  - 8909, 8910, and 8911 were sold to Società Servizi Trasporti Ferrara, but were originally sold to Autoguidovie in 2012
  - 8907, 8908, 8912, and 8913 were sold to Autoguidovie in 2012
  - 8905 and 8906 were sold to START Romagna in 2012
- 8918, 8922-8928, 8931, and 8933-8939 Irisbus 399E.12.35 MyWay
  - 8918 was sold to a private operator
  - 8926, 8927, 8931, 8933, 8936, 8938 and 8939 were sold to Autoguidovie in 2012 and renumbered respectively 1821, 1822, 1823, 1824, 1825, 1826, and 1827
  - 8922, 8923, 8924, 8925, 8928, 8934, 8935, and 8937 were sold to START Romagna in 2012
- 9004-9009 Iveco 380E.12.35 Euroclass (demolished in 2020)
- 9012-9013 MAN A01 NU 313 (withdrawn)
- 9014 MAN 18.460 HCL Beulas Eurostar (sold to Societa Servizi Trasporti Ferrara in 2014, it was demolished in 2019)
- 9015 Iveco 380E.12.38 Orlandi TopClass HD (demolished)
- 9016 and 9020 MAN A13 RH403 (withdrawn)
- 9021-9024 MAN NL222 FS Autodromo (withdrawn in 2019)
- 9100 and 9106 Iveco 393E.12.35 MyWay (9100 withdrawn due to a fire in 2012, 9106 dismissed)
- 9176-9177 and 9190-9195 Iveco 370.12.30 Dallavia (withdrawn between 2012 and 2018)
- 9180-9188 Iveco 370S.12.30 Autodromo (withdrawn between 2012 and 2018)
- 9196-9197 Iveco 370SE.12.35 Dallavia (withdrawn between 2019 and 2020)
- 9203, 9210 and 9213-9214 Menarini M201/2 SLI (9203 never entered service with TPER, while 9210 and 9213 and 9214 were withdrawn between 2014 and 2017)
- 9215 and 9219 MAN NU 313 (withdrawn)
- 9217 MAN UL 292 (withdrawn)
- 9218 MAN UL 310 (withdrawn)
- 9220 Mercedes-Benz O407 (withdrawn)
- 9221-9222 MAN UL 312 (withdrawn and demolished in 2019)
- 9223 and 9236 MAN NL 202
  - 9223 was withdrawn
  - 9236 ceded to the Ferrara fire department for exercising purposes in 2014
- 9224 Iveco 591E.12.27 CityClass (withdrawn in 2019, demolished in 2020)
- 9230 and 9233 MAN UEL 292 (withdrawn)
- 9238 Setra S300 NC (withdrawn)
- 9255 MAN A01 UL 313 Autodromo Regional I2000.12 (withdrawn)
- 9311, 9313 and 9317 Irisbus 399E.12.35 MyWay (all withdrawn due to separate fires)
- 9500-9513 Iveco 380E.12.29 Euroclass (all demolished)
- 9520 Iveco 389E.12.35 EuroClass

==== Bendy buses ====
- 903 VanHool AG300S (withdrawn in 2020)
- 918-925 VanHool AG300S (withdrawn between 2018 and 2020)
- 928 VanHool AG300S (withdrawn in 2020)
- 9050 VanHool AG300S (withdrawn in 2020)
- 904-917 BMB M321/1S
  - 906 was sold to SETA Modena in 2014, renumbered 2801 and withdrawn in 2018
  - 911 and 916 were sold to SETA Piacenza in 2012 and renumbered 490 and 491.They were withdrawn in 2019
  - 904-905, 907-910, 912-915, and 917 were all withdrawn and demolished in 2019)
- 9052-9053 MAN NG 272 (all withdrawn)

=== Trolleybuses ===
As the Bredabus 4001.12 FLU of the latter ATC (fleet number series 011-020) never entered service into TPER, the following vehicles, which merged in TPER, have been dismissed:

- 002-010 Menarini M220 FLU (withdrawn between 2012 and 2014, 001 was withdrawn by ATC)
- 1021-1029, 1031, and 1033-1040 MAN NGT 204F Autodromo (CAM) BusOtto "Bologna 1" (1204 was withdrawn in 2020, the rest by 2022)
- 1041, 1043, 1045-1048 and 1050-1053 MAN NGT 204F Autodromo BusOtto "Bologna 2" (withdrawn in 2022/3).

=== Preserved Buses ===
- 8866 Iveco 680E.12.26 TurboCity-I - Preserved by inBUSclub Emilia-Romagna in 2021.

== Historical Collection ==
TPER's predecessor, Azienda Trasporti Consorziali, has established over the years a collection of various train carriages; railway and tramway steam engines; electric tramcars; buses and trolleybuses which over the past 133 years had guaranteed public transport in the Bologna area. The museum, called "Collezione Storica ATC", was established inside the former tram and bus shed "Deposito Zucca" in Via di Saliceto; very close to the Ustica Memorial Museum, which hosts the wreck of the MC-Donnel Douglas DC-9 operating the Itavia Flight 870, which crashed in the Tyrrhenian Sea between the isles of Ponza and Ustica, killing all the people aboard. The Collezione Storica ATC has the following vehicles in its inventory:

=== Tramway and railway vehicles ===
Tramway and railway vehicles
Vehicle	Type	Year of construction	Year of withdrawal	Constructor	Type of motion	In service at	Preserved by ATC in	-
Freight Carriage	Railway and Tramway freight carriage	1887	unknown	L'Ausiliare	n.a.	L'Ausiliare	1981	built with a standard gauge, it is 8 m long and 2,75 m wide, and could travel at a maximum service speed of 50 km/h
Tram Locomotive	Steam engine tram locomotive	1892	1944	Ernesto Breda	steam engine	CNTC and SORIT Parma (1892-1938) and at the former sugar factory in Bologna (1938-1944)	1984	built with a standard gauge, it is 4.36 m longs and 2 m wide, and had a maximum speed of 20 km/h. Other similar locomotive have been in service on the Bologna-Casalecchio di Reno-Vignola tramway between 1893 and 1927. It was preserved by the Centro Studi e Documentazione Trasporti Territorio Bolognese
SV321 railway locomotive	steam engine railway locomotive	1906	1977	Henschel	steam engine	Società Veneta Ferrovie (1906-1968, on the Bologna-Portomaggiore railway and on the former Budrio-Massalombarda railway); and at the Ferriera di Omegna (1968-1977)	1980	it was built with a standard gauge and is 8.841 m long and 2.800 m wide. It was preserved by the Province of Bologna in 1980.
TBPM 9 tramway locomotive	steam engine tram locomotive	1907	1971	Henschel	steam engine	Bologna-Pieve di Cento-Malalbergo Tramway (1910-1946); and former sugar factory in Bologna (1946-1971)	1980	built with a standard gauge, it is 5.880 m long and 2.600 m wide. Similar locomotive have been in service on the Bologna-Casalecchio di Reno-Vignola tramway between 1909 and 1930. It was preserved by the Province of Bologna.
MCI 1 electric locomotive	electric railway and tramway locomotive	1918	1963	Carminati-Toselli TIBB	electric (300 V)	steel mill at Darfo Boario (1918-1957) and at Magazzini Centrali Italiani in Bologna (1957-1963)	1981	built with a standard gauge, it is 6.150 m long and 2.600 m, a speed of 30 km/h, and was in service only in industrial establishments
TBPM 11 - Polesine tramway locomotive	steam engine railway and tramway locomotive	1923	1970	Ansaldo	steam engine	various sugar factories in the Province of Bologna (1923-1941); on the Bologna-Pieve di Cento-Malalbergo (1941-1957) and on the Casalecchio di Reno-Vignola railway	1977	built with a standard gauge, it is 7.72 m long and 2.7 m wide, with a speed of 30 km/h. It was preserved by the Province of Bologna
ATM 121 electric tram locomotive	electric tram locomotive	1927	1958	Casaralta-CGE	electric (600 V)	Azienda Tranviaria Municipale Bologna (1927-1958)	1978	built with a standard gauge, it is 8.600 m long and 2.100 m wide, with a speed of 19 km/h. Two tram carriages could be attached to it.
APT L 912 locomotive	diesel railway and tram locomotive	1928	1974	Deutz	diesel	Società Aniene (?-1961) and Azienda Provincializzata Trasporti Bologna (1961-1974)	1981	built with a standard gauge, it is 5.300 m long and 2.600 m wide, with a speed of 10 km/h. Upon its transfer to APT Bologna, it was used on the railway siding between Porta Galliera and the Dozza area (formerly the Bologna-Pieve di Cento-Malalbergo tramway), the which remained active for the factories located in the area
Railway maintenance motor railcar	maintenance vehicle	1930	1984	Ferrovie dello Stato	FIAT Topolino petrol engine	Ferrovie dello Stato 1930-1940; and Casalecchio di Reno-Vignola railway (1940-1984)	1984	maintenance car used for equipment-placing purposes
Railway escalator and maintenance motor railcar	maintenance and escalator vehicle	1930	1960	Ferrovie dello Stato	FIAT Balilla engine	Ferrovie dello Stato (1930-1940) and Casalecchio di Reno-Vignola railway (1940-1960)	1984	maintenance and escalator car
ATM and ACOTRAL 210	electric tramcar	1935	1980	Stanga-CGE	electric (600 V)	Azienda Tranviaria Municipale Bologna (1935-1963) and at STEFER/ACOTRAL Rome (1965-1980)	1990	On 3 November 1963, ATM 210, alongside ATM 218, operated the last ever passenger tram service in Bologna, on the route 13 Piazza Minghetti San Ruffillo
ATM 218	electric tramcar	1938	1977	ATM-CGE	electric (600 V)	Azienda Tranviaria Municipale Bologna (1938-1963) and STEFER/ACOTRAL Rome (1965-1977)	1977	Tramcar ATM 218, alongside tramcar ATM 210, operated the last ever passenger tram service in Bologna on 3 November 1963, on route 13 Piazza Minghetti-San Ruffillo
Suburban pilot carriage FCV R14	diesel pilot rail carriage	1938	1983	Piaggio-CGE	diesel	Casalecchio di Reno-Vignola railway (1938-1967) and La Ferrovia Italiana (Arezzo 1967-1983)	1983	built with a standard gauge, it is 16.4 m long and 2.5 m wide, with a speed of 50 km/h. It could seat 110 passengers.
FCV M5 electric trainset	electric trainset	1938	1983	Piaggio-CGE	electric (600/3000 V)	Casalecchio di Reno-Vignola Railway (1938-1967) and La Ferrovia Italiana (Arezzo 1967-1983)	1983	built with a standard gauge, it is 16.4 m long and 2.5 m wide, with a speed of 50 km/h. It could seat 110 passengers
FCV L 902 electric locomotive	electric railway locomotive	1938	1992	Stanga-TIBB	electric (3000 V)	Casalecchio di Reno-Vignola railway (1938-1992)	1992	it was built with a standard gauge, it is 12.151 m long and 2.5 m wide, with a speed of 50 km/h
Brill CCFP 199 electric tramcar	electric tram locomotive	1938	1995	unknown	electric (600 V)	Comp. Carris de Ferro do Porto	1995	it was preserved by ATC Bologna, due to its mechanics resembling the one of various tramcars which had operated in Bologna in 1907
Brill CCFP 206 electric tramcar	electric tramcar	1943	1995	unknown	electric (600 V)	Comp. Carris de Ferro do Porto (1943-1995)	1995	it was preserved by ATC, due to its mechanics resembling the one of various tramcars which had operated in Bologna in 1907

=== Buses and trolleybuses ===
Buses and trolleybuses
Vehicle	Type	Year of construction	Year of withdrawal	Constructor	Type of motion	In service at	Preserved by ATC in	-
ATM 1335	Fiat Macchi bendy trolleybus	1964	1981	Fiat Macchi-CGE	electric (600 V)	Azienda Trasporti Municipali Bologna (1964-1974) and Azienda Trasporti Consorziali Bologna (1974-1981)	1981	it was preserved by ATC Bologna in 1981, one year before the second trolleybus system in Bologna was closed down
ACFT Fiat 412h Aerfer double-decker bus (formerly ATC 2727)	double decker bus	1970	2004	Fiat-Aerfer	gasoline	Azienda Trasporti Municipali Bologna (1970-1974), Azienda Trasporti Consorziali Bologna (1974-1987), and Azienda Consortile Ferrarese Trasporti Ferrara) (1987-2004)	2007	this double-decker bus, upon being ceded to ACFT, operated the local BiBus sightseeing tour until 2004, when it was withdrawn. In 2006, the Circolo ATC Giuseppe Dozza purchased it and donated it to the ATC collection. Other Aerfer double-decker buses of the latter ATM and ATC have been preserved, namely the no. 2710 (at the moto-cross racetrack in Liano (BO)), the 2711 used as a moving warehouse.
ATC 160 (Fiat Cameri 306/3)	interurban bus	1972	1999	Fiat-Cameri	gasoline	Azienda Provinciale Trasporti Bologna (1972-1974) and Azienda Trasporti Consorziali Bologna (1974-1999)	1999	n/a
ATC 4030 (Fiat 421/A Menarini) - colloquially known as "Bus 37"	urban bus	1973	1999	Fiat-Menarini	gasoline	Azienda Trasporti Municipale Bologna (1973-1974) and Azienda Trasporti Consorziali Bologna (1974-1999)	1999	this bus happened to be in service on 2 August 1980 when the Bologna massacre occurred, and was about to depart on route 37, from which it retained the name "Bus 37". After the explosion at the station, its driver Agide Melloni decided to transport the victims' corpses to the mortuary at the Sant'Orsola-Malpighi Hospital. It has been preserved in remembrance of this event, and gets out of the depot every 2 August on the occasion of the Bologna massacre's remembrance
ATC 2120 (Eta Beta)	Pollicino FIAT Iveco CAM 49 au/e minibus	1994	2003	Carrozzeria Autodromo Modena	electric engine with batteries	Azienda Trasporti Consorziali Bologna (1994-2000) and ATC S.p.A. (2000-2003)	2003	replaced in 2003 by the Iveco Downtown, it has been preserved because it was an experimental bus which inspired the production of electric buses with batteries.

== Bus Routes Bologna Basin ==
=== Bologna Urban Routes ===
- A Poliambulatorio Rizzoli-Piazza Maggiore-Piazza Liber Paradisus (Does not Operate on Sundays and Public Holidays)
- C Via Castiglione-Piazza Maggiore-Stazione Centrale-Parcheggio Tanari (Weekdays Only)
- D Stazione Centrale-Via Ravone (Does not Operate on Sundays and Public Holidays)
- FBP Autostazione-Zanolini (Stazione Bologna Zanolini)-Rimesse (Stazione Rimesse)-Giambologna (Stazione S. Rita)-Roveri (Stazione Bologna Roveri)-Ca' dell'Orbo (Stazione Ca' dell'Orbo)-Castenaso Stellina (Stazione Castenaso Stellina)-Castenaso (Stazione Castenaso)-Budrio (Stazione Budrio) (SFM, rail replacement bus due to the ongoing works to the Bologna-Portomaggiore railway)
- T2 Piazza Maggiore-Piazza Roosevelt-Stazione Centrale-Parcheggio Tanari (Saturdays Only)
- 11A Via Corelli/Ponticella-Via Indipendenza-Agucchi Bertalia
- 11B Ponticella-Via Indipendenza-ITC Rosa Luxembourg (Does not Operate on Sundays and Public Holidays)
- 11C Via Corelli/Ponticella-Via Indipendenza-Arcoveggio Giardini
- 13 Piazza Malpighi-Via Rizzoli-San Ruffillo-Via Pavese (Weekdays Only)
- 13A Piazza Malpighi-Via Rizzoli-San Ruffillo-Rastignano (Weekdays Only)
- 13B Piazza Malpighi-Via Rizzoli-San Ruffillo-Rastignano-Carteria di Sesto (Weekdays Evenings Only)
- 13B Piazza Cavour-San Ruffillo-Rastignano (Saturdays, Sundays and Public Holidays)
- 13C Piazza Cavour-San Ruffillo-Rastignano-Carteria Di Sesto-Pian di Macina-Pianoro Nuovo-Pianoro Vecchio (Saturdays, Sundays, and Public Holidays).
- 13 Piazza Cavour-San Ruffillo-Via Pavese (Saturdays, Sundays and Public Holidays)
- 13X Rastignano-Via Pavese-Piazza Malpighi (Weekdays Only, renumbered 13X in summer 2026)
- 13/ Via Pavese-Piazza Malpighi (Weekdays Only)
- 13/ Carteria di Sesto-Rastignano/Via Pavese-Piazza Malpighi (Weekdays Evenings Only)
- 13 Via Pavese-San Ruffillo-Piazza Cavour (Saturdays, Sundays and Public Holidays)
- 14 Deposito Due Madonne/Zona Roveri/Pilastro-Ospedale Sant'Orsola-Via Rizzoli-Stadio-Piazza Giovanni XXIII
- 14A Piazza Giovanni XXIII-Stadio-Via Rizzoli-Ospedale Sant'Orsola-Deposito Due Madonne
- 14B Piazza Giovanni XXIII-Stadio-Via Rizzoli-Ospedale Sant'Orsola-Zona Roveri (Weekdays Only)
- 14C Piazza Giovanni XXIII-Stadio-Via Rizzoli-Ospedale Sant'Orsola-Pilastro
- 15 XX Settembre Autostazione-Via Rizzoli-San Lazzaro di Savena Via Pertini (Weekdays Only)
- 16 Piazza Cavour-Villa Mazzacorati-Via Foscherara-Piazzale Atleti Azzurri d'Italia
- 18 Piazza San Francesco-Via Zanardi-Noce-Trebbo di Reno
- 19 Casteldebole-Ospedale Maggiore-Via Rizzoli-San Lazzaro di Savena Via Pertini
- 19A Casteldebole-Ospedale Maggiore-Via Rizzoli-San Lazzaro di Savena-Idice-Ozzano dell'Emilia-Tolara Bivio
- 19B Casteldebole-Ospedale Maggiore-Via Rizzoli-San Lazzaro di Savena-San Camillo
- 19C Casteldebole-Ospedale Maggiore-Via Rizzoli-San Lazzaro di Savena Stazione Ferroviaria (SFM)
- 20 Pilastro-Via San Donato-Via Rizzoli-Casalecchio di Reno
- 20A Pilastro-Via San Donato-Via Rizzoli-Casalecchio di Reno Stazione Garibaldi (SFM)
- 20B Pilastro-Via San Donato-Via Rizzoli-Casalecchio di Reno-San Biagio
- 21 Filanda-Via Marconi-Stazione Centrale-Via Andreini
- 21B Filanda-Via Marconi-Stazione Centrale-San Sisto Ostello (Evenings Only)
- 22 Via Caduti di Casteldebole-Via Lepido (Weekdays Only)
- 23 Via Lame-Via Normandia (Some evening trips to Lavino di Mezzo)
- 25 Deposito Due Madonne-Ospedale Sant'Orsola-Via Rizzoli-Stazione Centrale-Dozza Via del Gomito
- 25A Deposito Due Madonne-Ospedale Sant'Orsola-Via Rizzoli-Stazione Centrale-Dozza
- 27A Piazzale Atleti Azzurri d'Italia/Via Genova-Via Rizzoli-Via Indipendenza-Corticella Via Byron
- 27B Piazzale Atleti Azzurri d'Italia-Via Rizzoli-Via Indipendenza-Corticella Stazione Ferroviaria (SFM)
- 27C Piazzale Atleti Azzurri d'Italia/Via Genova-Via Rizzoli-Via Indipendenza-Via Tuscolano (Weekdays Only)
- 28 Via Indipendenza-Via Marconi-Via dei Mille-Fiera (Weekdays Only)
- 28 Piazza dei Martiri-Via dei Mille-Fiera (Saturdays, Sundays and Public Holidays)
- 29 Parcheggio Tanari-Via Rizzoli-Piazza Maggiore-Via di Roncrio
- 29S Via di Roncrio-Piazza Maggiore-Via Zanardi-Noce
- 30 San Michele in Bosco-Piazza Malpighi-Via Marconi-Stazione Centrale-Via Colombo Sostegno (Does not Operate on Sundays and Public Holidays)
- 30/ San Michele in Bosco-Piazza Malpighi-Via Marconi-Stazione Centrale (Sundays Only)
- 32 Stazione Centrale-Porta San Mamolo-Stazione Centrale (Right Circular, does not operate on Sundays and Public Holidays)
- 33 Stazione Centrale-Porta San Mamolo-Stazione Centrale (Left Circular)
- 34 Piazza dell'Unità-Ospedale Maggiore (Does not operate on Saturday afternoon, Sundays and Public Holidays)
- 35 Ospedale Maggiore-Stazione Centrale-Fiera-Pilastro-CAAB (Does not operate on Sundays and Public Holidays)
- 35/ Ospedale Maggiore-Stazione Centrale (Saturday afternoon and Sundays Only)
- 36 Ospedale Bellaria-Ospedale Sant'Orsola-Stazione Centrale-Ospedale Maggiore-Via Naldi
- 36 Via Naldi-Ospedale Maggiore-Stazione Centrale-Ospedale Sant'Orsola-Ospedale Malpighi-San Lazzaro di Savena-Cicogna-San Camillo (operates only on Sundays and Public Holidays)
- 37 Rotonda CNR-Stazione Centrale-Ospedale Sant'Orsola-Via Bombicci (Weekdays Only)
- 37 Stazione Centrale-Ospedale Sant'Orsola-Via Bombicci (Saturdays and Sundays Only)
- 38 Fiera-Via Farini-Via XXI Aprile-Certosa-Ospedale Maggiore-Stazione Centrale-Fiera (Right Periferic Circular, numbered 38C on Sundays)
- 39 Fiera-Stazione Centrale-Ospedale Maggiore-Via XXI Aprile-Via Farini-Fiera (Left Periferic Circular, numbered 39C on Sundays)
- 51 Largo Lercaro-San Ruffillo-Monte Donato (Does not Operate on Sundays and Public Holidays)
- 51 Piazza Cavour-Monte Donato (Sundays Only)
- 52 Piazza Cavour-Villa Aldini-Sabbiuno
- 52A Piazza Cavour-Villa Aldini
- 54 Aeroporto-Borgo Panigale-Villaggio Speranza (Does not Operate on Sundays and Public Holidays)
- 55 San Ruffillo Stazione Ferroviaria (SFM)-Villa Mazzacorati-Deposito Due Madonne-Pilastro-CAAB (Does not Operate on Sundays and Public Holidays)
- 56 Via Larga-Zona Roveri (Weekdays Only)
- 58 Villa Spada-Santuario di San Luca
- 59 Piazza Cavour-Villa Guastavillani (Does not Operate on Sundays and Public Holidays)
- 60 Ospedale Sant'Orsola-Mercato San Donato-Ospedale Sant'Orsola
- 61 Deposito Battindarno-Stadio-Piazza Malpighi-Via Marconi-Stazione Centrale-Via Massarenti-Villa Mazzacorati-Stazione Centrale-Ospedale Maggiore-Deposito Battindarno (Night Bus - operates on weekdays only)
- 62 Deposito Due Madonne-Via Farini-Piazza Malpighi-Via Marconi-Stazione Centrale-Corticella-Stazione Centrale-Via Rizzoli-Deposito Due Madonne (Night Bus - operates on weekdays only)
- 68 Via dei Mille-Via Stalingrado-Camping Città di Bologna (it currently departs from Stazione Centrale due to the construction of the tram)
- 79 Casalecchio di Reno-Zona Industriale Zola Predosa-Borgo Panigale-Piazza Giovanni XXIII (Weekdays Only)
- 80 Borgo Panigale Via Normandia-Zona Industriale Zola Predosa (Weekdays Only)
- 85 Casalecchio di Reno AUSL-Casalecchio di Reno-Casalecchio di Reno Stazione Garibaldi-Unipol Arena (SFM) (Does not Operate on Sundays and Public Holidays)
- Q Aeroporto-Ospedale Maggiore-Stazione Centrale
- 945 Aeroporto-Fiera District (in operation only during events at the Fiera)
- 975 Stazione Centrale-Unipol Arena (operates only during concerts or events at the Unipol Arena)

Other urban special bus lines of Bologna (from Friday to Sunday, eve of holidays and public holidays only) - (Night lines)

- N1 Funo Stazione-Mille-San Lazzaro
- N2 Dozza-Mille
- N3 Ponte Ronca-Mille-San Sisto
- N4 Piazza Giovanni XXIII-Mille-Roveri
- N5 Bertalia-Mille-Battaglia
- N6 Piazza Cavour-Rastignano
- N7 Normandia-Piazza dei Martiri
- N8 Piazza Aldrovandi-Ospedale Malpighi-Ospedale Sant'Orsola-Sant'Egidio

=== Imola Urban Routes ===
- 1 Ospedale Nuovo-Zolino-Stazione Ferroviaria (SFM and National Railways)-Porta dei Servi (Does not Operate on Sundays and Public Holidays)
- 2 Pedagna-Ospedale Nuovo-Zolino-Stazione Ferroviaria (SFM and National Railways)-Campanella-Rivazza-Stazione Ferroviaria (SFM and National Railways) (Does not Operate on Sundays and Public Holidays)
- 4 Via Grieco Poste-Stazione Ferroviaria (SFM and National Railways)-Via Dalla Chiesa (Does not Operate on Sundays and Public Holidays)
- 9 Stazione Ferroviaria (SFM and National Railways)-Pedagna Ovest (Sundays Only)
- 104 Via Grieco Poste-Stazione Ferroviaria (SFM and National Railways)-Via Dalla Chiesa-Castel del Rio
- 140 Imola Autostazione-Montecatone-Montebello (Does not Operate on Sundays and Public Holidays)
- 150 Imola Autostazione-San Prospero (Does not Operate on Sundays and Public Holidays)
- 160 Imola Autostazione-Zello (Does not Operate on Sundays and Public Holidays)

=== Bologna Suburban Routes ===
- 81 Bologna Stazione Centrale (SFM, National and International Railways)-Ospedale Maggiore-Longara
- 81A Bologna Stazione Centrale (SFM, National and International Railways)-Ospedale Maggiore-Longara-Padulle-Bagno di Piano (Does not operate on Sundays and Public Holidays)
- 83 Bologna Piazza dei Martiri-Ospedale Maggiore-Casalecchio di Reno-Riale-Calderino di Monte San Pietro-Zona Industriale Bacchello (Does not operate on Sundays and Public Holidays)
- 86 Piazza Roosevelt-Ospedale Maggiore-Casalecchio di Reno-Marullina (Weekdays Only)
- 86 Piazza San Francesco-Ospedale Maggiore-Casalecchio di Reno-Marullina (Saturdays, Sundays and Public Holidays)
- 87 Rotonda CNR/Stazione Centrale/Via Lame-Ospedale Maggiore-Borgo Panigale-Anzola Emilia-Ponte Samoggia-Castelfranco Emilia Stazione Ferroviaria (SFM, National Railways and SETA bus services)
- 88 Via dei Mille-Cadriano-Granarolo dell'Emilia (it currently departs from Stazione Centrale due to the construction of the tram)
- 88C Via dei Mille-Zona Industriale Cadriano-Cadriano-Granarolo dell'Emilia (Weekdays Only, it currently departs from Stazione Centrale due to the construction of the tram)
- 89 Ca' dell'Orbo/Villanova di Castenaso-Ospedale Sant'Orsola-Via dei Mille-Via Marconi-Certosa-Casalecchio di Reno-San Biagio (Does not operate on Sundays and Public Holidays)
- 89C San Biagio-Casalecchio di Reno-Certosa-Via Marconi-Ospedale Sant'Orsola-Villanova di Castenaso-Ca' dell'Orbo (Does not operate on Sundays and Public Holidays)
- 90 Piazza Cavour-Ospedale Bellaria-San Lazzaro di Savena-Cicogna-San Camillo (does not operate on Sundays and Public Holidays)
- 90 San Lazzaro di Savena-Cicogna-San Camillo (operates on Sundays and Public Holidays)
- 90A Piazza Cavour-Ospedale Bellaria-San Lazzaro di Savena-Cicogna-Idice-Ozzano dell'Emilia Via Galvani (Does not operate on Sundays and Public Holidays)
- 90C Piazza Cavour-Ospedale Bellaria-San Lazzaro di Savena-Cicogna-Idice-Ozzano dell'Emilia Facoltà di Veterinaria (Does not operate on Sundays and Public Holidays)
- 90/ San Lazzaro di Savena-Ospedale Bellaria-Piazza Malpighi-Via Marconi-Via dei Mille (Does not operate on Sundays and Public Holidays)
- 91 Bologna Stazione Centrale (SFM, National and International Railways)-Ospedale Maggiore-Calderara di Reno
- 91A Bologna Stazione Centrale (SFM, National and International Railways)-Ospedale Maggiore-Calderara di Reno-Padulle
- 92 Sibano/Marzabotto/Vergato-Sasso Marconi Terminal-Borgonuovo-Casalecchio di Reno-Ospedale Maggiore-Via dei Mille-Noce-Trebbo di Reno (Does not operate on Sundays and Public Holidays)
- 92A Trebbo di Reno-Noce-Via dei Mille-Ospedale Maggiore-Casalecchio di Reno-Borgonuovo-Sasso Marconi Terminal (Does not operate on Sundays and Public Holidays)
- 92B Trebbo di Reno-Noce-Via dei Mille-Ospedale Maggiore-Casalecchio di Reno-Borgonuovo-Sasso Marconi Terminal-Vergato/Marzabotto/Sibano (Does not operate on Sundays and Public Holidays)
- 93 Piazza dei Martiri-Via San Donato-San Sisto-Granarolo dell'Emilia-Baricella-Mondonuovo Deposito
- 93A Piazza dei Martiri-Via San Donato-San Sisto-Granarolo dell'Emilia (Does not operate on Sundays and Public Holidays)
- 93B Piazza dei Martiri-Via San Donato-San Sisto-Granarolo dell'Emilia-Baricella (Does not operate on Sundays and Public Holidays)
- 94 Bazzano Stazione Ferroviaria (SFM and SETA bus services)-Crespellano-Zola Predosa-Riale-Casalecchio di Reno-Piazza Malpighi-Via Marconi-Via dei Mille-Ospedale Sant'Orsola-San Lazzaro di Savena-Idice-Ozzano dell'Emilia-Osteria Grande-Castel San Pietro Terme (Does not operate on Sundays and Public Holidays)
- 96 Piazza Cavour-San Ruffillo-Rastignano-Carteria di Sesto-Musiano-Pian di Macina-Pianoro Nuovo-Pianoro Vecchio
- 96 Piazza Cavour-San Ruffillo-Rastignano-Musiano-Pian di Macina-Pianoro Nuovo-Pianoro Vecchio-Loiano-Monghidoro (Sundays Only)
- 96A Piazza Cavour-San Ruffillo-Rastignano-Carteria di Sesto (Does not operate on Sundays and Public Holidays)
- 96/ Pianoro Vecchio-Pianoro Nuovo-Pian di Macina-Musiano-Carteria di Sesto-Rastignano-San Ruffillo-Piazza Malpighi-Via Marconi-Via dei Mille-Corticella-Centergross-Interporto (Weekdays Only)
- 97 Bologna Via Lame-Via dei Mille-Corticella-Castel Maggiore-Funo-Argelato-Castello d'Argile-San Giorgio di Piano
- 97A Bologna Via Lame-Via dei Mille-Corticella-Castel Maggiore-Funo-Argelato-Castello d'Argile-San Giorgio di Piano-San Pietro in Casale (Does not operate on Sundays and Public Holidays)
- 97B Bologna Via Lame-Via dei Mille-Corticella-Castel Maggiore-Funo-Argelato-Castello d'Argile-San Giorgio di Piano-San Pietro in Casale-Galliera/San Venanzio/Poggio Renatico (Does not operate on Sundays and Public Holidays)
- 97C Bologna Via Lame-Via dei Mille-Corticella-Castel Maggiore-Funo-Argelato-Castello d'Argile-Pieve di Cento-Cento Autostazione
- 98 Bologna Via Lame-Via dei Mille-Corticella-Castel Maggiore
- 98A Bologna Via Lame-Via dei Mille-Corticella-La Pira-Castel Maggiore (Does not operate on Sundays and Public Holidays)

=== Interurban Routes ===
==== Routes Serving Bologna ====
- 99 Piazza dei Martiri-Ospedale Sant'Orsola-Villanova di Castenaso-Ca' dell'Orbo-Castenaso-Medicina (Autoguidovie Italiane's Bus Services)
- 99A Piazza dei Martiri-Ospedale Sant'Orsola-Villanova di Castenaso-Ca' dell'Orbo-Castenaso-Medicina-Sesto Imolese-Massa Lombarda-Lugo Autostazione (Start Romagna Bus Services)
- 99B Piazza dei Martiri-Ospedale Sant'Orsola-Villanova di Castenaso-Ca' dell'Orbo-Castenaso-Budrio-Medicina
- 99C Piazza dei Martiri-Ospedale Sant'Orsola-Villanova di Castenaso-Ca' dell'Orbo-Castenaso-Medicina-Castelguelfo
- 101 Bologna Autostazione-San Lazzaro di Savena-Idice-Ozzano dell'Emilia-Osteria Grande-Castel San Pietro Terme-Toscanella di Dozza-Imola Autostazione (interchange at Imola with services from Cooperativa Trasporti Riolo Terme Bus Services)
- 106 Bologna Autostazione-San Lazzaro di Savena-Zona Industriale Ponte Rizzoli (Weekdays Only)
- 200 Medicina-Villanova di Castenaso-Ospedale Sant'Orsola-Bologna Autostazione (Weekdays Only)
- 205 Bologna Autostazione-Ospedale Sant'Orsola-Villanova di Castenaso-Castenaso-Ponte Rizzoli-Castelguelfo (Does not operate on Sundays and Public Holidays)
- 206 Bologna Autostazione-Sesto Imolese-Massalombarda-Lugo (Does not operate on Sundays and Public Holidays) (interchange with Start Romagna bus services in Lugo)
- 211 Bologna Autostazione-Ospedale Sant'Orsola-Villanova di Castenaso-Castenaso-Budrio-Medicina-Castelguelfo (Does not operate on Sundays and Public Holidays)
- 237 Bologna Autostazione-Ospedale Sant'Orsola-Villanova di Castenaso-Ca' dell'Orbo-Dugliolo-Alberino (Does not operate on Sundays and Public Holidays)
- 242 Bologna Autostazione-Castenaso-Medicina (Night Bus, Saturdays Only)
- 243 Bologna Autostazione-Ospedale Sant'Orsola-Villanova di Castenaso-Castenaso-Budrio-Molinella-Marmorta (Does not operate on Sundays and Public Holidays)
- 257 Bologna Autostazione-Ospedale Sant'Orsola-Villanova di Castenaso-Ca' dell'Orbo-Castenaso-Villa Fontana-Sant'Antonio-Campotto-Argenta (Does not operate on Sundays and Public Holidays)
- 273 Bologna Autostazione-Ospedale Sant'Orsola-Villanova di Castenaso-Budrio-Molinella-Santa Maria Codifiume/Ospital Monacale (Does not operate on Sundays and Public Holidays)
- 353 Menarini-Cadriano-Altedo-Malalbergo-Gallo-Ferrara Corso Isonzo (Weekdays Only)
- 354 Bologna Autostazione-Altedo-Gallo (Does not operate on Sundays and Public Holidays)
- 356 Bologna Autostazione-Dozza-Altedo-Malalbergo-Gallo-Ferrara Autostazione
- 357 Bologna Autostazione-Dozza-Altedo-Mondonuovo-Alberino-Passo Segni (Does not operate on Sundays and Public Holidays)
- 446 Bologna Autostazione-Dozza-Bentivoglio-Saletto (Does not operate on Sundays and Public Holidays)
- 447 Bologna Autostazione-Zona Industriale Saliceto-Bentivoglio-Saletto (Does not operate on Sundays and Public Holidays)
- 448 Bologna Autostazione-Corticella-Centergross-Interporto (Weekdays Only)
- 450 Cento Autostazione-Pieve di Cento-Castello d'Argile-Argelato-Corticella-Via dei Mille-Bologna Via Lame (Weekdays Only, Direct Route)
- 556 Cento Autostazione-Decima-San Giovanni in Persiceto-Bargellino-Borgo Panigale-Ospedale Maggiore-Bologna Autostazione (Does not operate on Sundays and Public Holidays)
- 576 Bologna Autostazione-Ospedale Maggiore-Borgo Panigale-Bargellino-San Giovanni in Persiceto-Sant'Agata Bolognese-Crevalcore (Does not operate on Sundays and Public Holidays)
- 646 Bologna Autostazione-Ospedale Maggiore-Borgo Panigale-Anzola Emilia-Ponte Samoggia-Calcara-Piumazzo-San Cesario-Spilamberto-Bazzano Stazione (SFM and SETA Bus Services) (Does not operate on Sundays and Public Holidays)
- 651 Bologna Autostazione-Ospedale Maggiore-Borgo Panigale-Ponte Samoggia-Calcara-Bazzano Stazione/Zocca/Savigno/Tolè (Does not operate on Sundays and Public Holidays)
- 671 Bologna Autostazione-Casalecchio di Reno-Riale-Zola Predosa-Crespellano-Bazzano Stazione-Vignola Terminal (SFM and SETA Bus Services)
- 672 Bologna Autostazione/Casalecchio di Reno-Zona Industriale Zola Predosa-Lavino di Sopra/Bazzano Stazione-Vignola Terminal (SFM and SETA Bus Services) (Does not operate on Sundays and Public Holidays)
- 673 Via Normandia-Zola Predosa Rigosa-Pilastrino di Zola (Weekdays Only)
- 676 Porta Sant'Isaia-Via Lunga-Philip Morris (Weekdays Only)
- 677 Bologna Stazione Centrale-Via Normandia-Anzola dell'Emilia-Philip Morris (Weekdays Only)
- 686 Bologna Autostazione-Casalecchio di Reno-Riale-Calderino di Monte San Pietro-Tolè
- 706 Bologna Autostazione-Casalecchio di Reno-Borgonuovo-Sasso Marconi-Marzabotto-Sibano-Pian di Venola-Vergato (Does not operate on Sundays and Public Holidays)
- 826 Bologna Autostazione-Casalecchio di Reno-Sasso Marconi-Vado-Rioveggio-San Benedetto Val di Sambro-Castiglione dei Pepoli-Roncobilaccio-San Giacomo
- 856 Bologna Autostazione-Casalecchio di Reno-Sasso Marconi-Vado-Rioveggio-San Benedetto Val di Sambro
- 900 Bologna Autostazione-Rastignano-Carteria di Sesto-Pianoro Vecchio-Loiano-Monghidoro (Weekdays Only, Direct Route - passengers can board between Monghidoro and Pianoro Vecchio Fondovalle Savena, in direction of Bologna and between Bologna Autostazione and Pianoro Vecchio Fondovalle Savena in direction of Monghidoro, the remaining stops are alighting only)
- 906 Bologna Autostazione-Rastignano-Carteria di Sesto-Pian di Macina-Pianoro Vecchio-Livergnano-Loiano-Monghidoro-Castel dell'Alpi
- 916 Bologna Autostazione-San Lazzaro di Savena-Idice-Monterenzio-Quinzano-Frassineta-Monghidoro
- 918 Bologna Autostazione-San Lazzaro di Savena-Idice-Quinzano-Loiano
- Bologna-Mirabilandia (Summer Seasonal Route) (SACA Bus Service)

==== Interurban Routes not serving Bologna ====
- 103 Castel San Pietro Terme-Sassoleone-Piancaldoli
- 110 Castel San Pietro Terme Stazione Ferroviaria-Montecalderaro
- 111 Varignana-Osteria Grande
- 112 Castel San Pietro Terme Stazione Ferroviaria-Castel San Pietro Terme
- 113 Castel San Pietro Terme Stazione Ferroviaria-Scania-Castel San Pietro Terme
- 121 San Lazzaro di Savena-Mirandola
- 122 San Lazzaro di Savena-Villanova di Castenaso-Ca' dell'Orbo
- 124 Ponticella-Ospedale Bellaria-San Lazzaro di Savena
- 125 Ponticella-Villaggio Martino-San Lazzaro di Savena
- 126 San Lazzaro di Savena-Lago dei Castori
- 131 Ozzano Galvani/Facolta' di Veterinaria-Ozzano FS (CityBus Ozzano - introduced in 2021)
- 132 Ponte Rizzoli-Zone Industriali-Ozzano Galvani (CityBus Ozzano 2021)
- 151 Imola Autostazione-Mordano-Bagnara di Romagna-Massalombarda-Lugo
- 231 Mondonuovo Deposito-Baricella-Granarolo dell'Emilia-Budrio
- 244 Budrio-Mezzolara-Molinella
- 247 Alberino-Medicina-Villafontana-Castel San Pietro Terme
- 248 Castel San Pietro Terme-Medicina
- 256 Medicina-Longastrino-Conselice
- 296 Conselice-Lugo-Bagnacavallo-Ravenna/Lido Adriano (this beach is served only in summer)
- 355 Altedo-Boschi
- 411 Argelato-Trebbo di Reno-Corticella Via Byron-Castel Maggiore
- 413 Castel Maggiore-Zona Industriale Saliceto
- 449 San Giorgio di Piano FS-Zona Industriale Bentivoglio-Ca' de Fabbri-Zona Industriale Minerbio
- 453 San Giorgio di Piano-Venezzano-Castello d'Argile-Cento Autostazione
- 455 San Pietro in Casale-Cento Autostazione
- 456 San Pietro in Casale-Poggetto-Cento Autostazione
- 505 Calderara di Reno-Longara-Bonconvento-Padulle-Bagno di Piano
- 531 San Giovanni in Persiceto-Castelfranco Emilia
- 656 Bazzano Stazione Ferroviaria-Monteveglio-Zocca
- 657 Bazzano Stazione Ferroviaria-Monteveglio-Castelletto di Serravalle-Savigno
- 658 Bazzano Stazione Ferroviaria-Monteveglio-Savigno-Goccia-Tolè
- 687 Sasso Marconi Terminal-Mongardino-Calderino di Monte San Pietro-Ponte Rivabella
- 688 Ponte Rivabella-Padernella
- 716 Marzabotto-Tolè
- 726 Vergato-Labante-Montese
- 727 Vergato-Cereglio-Montese
- 728 Vergato-Tolè
- 737 Vergato-Marano-Montese
- 746 Vergato-Riola-Porretta Terme
- 747 Porretta Terme-Marano-Montese-Semelano
- 756 Porretta Terme-Abetaia-Montese
- 757 Porretta Terme-Querciola-Montese
- 766 Porretta Terme-Ponte della Venturina
- 767 Porretta Terme-Case Calistri
- 768 Porretta Terme-Casa Forlai
- 770 Porretta Terme Viale Repubblica-Porretta Terme Terminal
- 776 Porretta Terme-Vidiciatico-Corno alle Scale
- 787 Porretta Terme-Castelluccio-Pennola
- 796 Porretta Terme-Castel di Casio-Suviana-Baigno-Castiglione dei Pepoli
- 797 Porretta Terme-Ponte della Venturina-Badi-Suviana
- 798 Porretta Terme-Casola-Lizzo-Castel di Casio
- 806 Vergato-Badi-Suviana
- 808 Vergato-Riola-Castiglione dei Pepoli
- 827 Sasso Marconi Stazione Ferroviaria-Monzuno-Vado
- 828 San Benedetto Val di Sambro Stazione Ferroviaria-Castiglione dei Pepoli
- 829 Vergato-Stanco
- 846 Ponte Locatello-Grizzana-Vergato
- 857 Bivio Ca' di Martino-San Benedetto Val di Sambro-Monghidoro-Loiano
- 858 Bivio Ca' di Martino-Pian del Voglio-Bruscoli-Castiglione dei Pepoli
- 907 Monghidoro-Loiano Bivio Monzuno

=== School Routes ===
==== Bologna Urban and Interurban ====
- 101 Bologna Autostazione-San Lazzaro di Savena-Idice-Ozzano dell'Emilia-Osteria Grande-Castel San Pietro Terme-Imola Istituto Alberghetti-Imola Guicciardini
- 123 Via Firenze-Ponticella
- 179 Via Normandia-Borgo Panigale-Rotonda Malaguti ITIS
- 180 ITC Manfredi Tanari-Istituto Aldini
- 181 Via Marconi/Bologna Autostazione-Istituto Serpieri
- 182 Piazza dell'Unità-ITC Manfredi Tanari
- 183 ITC Rosa Luxembourg-Ospedale Maggiore-Rotonda Malaguti ITIS
- 184 Bologna Autostazione-ITC Rosa Luxembourg
- 185 Piazza dei Martiri-ITC Rosa Luxembourg
- 186 Bologna Autostazione-Ospedale Sant'Orsola-Istituto Arcangeli
- 187 Stazione Centrale-Ospedale Sant'Orsola-Istituto Arcangeli
- 189 Case Nuove-Fiera
- 213 Bologna Autostazione-Via San Donato-Castenaso-Budrio-Fiesso-Vigorso-Medicina
- 300 Mondonuovo Deposito-Baricella-Minerbio-Granarolo dell'Emilia-Via San Donato-Via dei Mille-Piazza dei Martiri (Direct Route - boarding only stops between Mondonuovo Deposito and Quarto Inferiore, alighting only stops from Virgolone onwards)
- 504 Sala Bolognese-Padulle-Funo-Castel Maggiore-Corticella-Bologna Autostazione
- 684 Bologna Autostazione-Casalecchio di Reno-Riale-Calderino di Monte San Pietro-Savigno
- 850 Bologna Autostazione-Casalecchio di Reno-A1 Motorway-Castiglione dei Pepoli-San Benedetto Val di Sambro-Pian del Voglio-Castel dell'Alpi (Direct Route via A1 Motorway - only passengers with a membership/season ticket for this route are allowed to board, and cannot alight before Casalecchio di Reno, in direction of Bologna; or before Albergo Val Di Setta in direction of Castel dell'Alpi)
- 903 Pianoro Vecchio-Pianoro Nuovo-Pian di Macina-Musiano-Carteria di Sesto-Rastignano-San Ruffillo-Villa Mazzacorati-Via Foscherara-San Lazzaro di Savena Istituto Majorana
- 904 Pianoro Vecchio-Pianoro Nuovo-Pian di Macina-Musiano-Carteria di Sesto-Rastignano-San Ruffillo-Villa Mazzacorati-Via Dagnini-Liceo Scientifico Enrico Fermi
- 905 Pianoro Vecchio-Pianoro Nuovo-Pian di Macina-Musiano-Carteria di Sesto-Rastignano-San Ruffillo-Villa Mazzacorati-Via Foscherara-ITC Manfredi Tanari

==== Imola Urban and Interurban ====
- 101 Bologna Autostazione-San Lazzaro di Savena-Idice-Ozzano dell'Emilia-Osteria Grande-Castel San Pietro Terme-Imola Istituto Alberghetti-Imola Guicciardini
- 141 Imola Autostazione-Borgo Tossignano-Casalfiumanese-Castel del Rio
- 142 Imola Autostazione-Borgo Tossignano-Fontanelice-Sassoleone-Piancaldoli
- 143 Castel del Rio-Sassoleone-Piancaldoli
- 144 Imola Autostazione-Borgo Tossignano-Casalfiumanese
- 152 Imola Autostazione-Fruges-Massalombarda-Lugo
- 154 Imola Autostazione-Fruges-Massalombarda-Conselice-Campotto
- 156 Imola Autostazione-Castelguelfo
- 157 Imola Ospedale Nuovo-Castelguelfo-Medicina
- 160 Imola Autostazione-Zello
- 161 Imola Autostazione-Istituto Agrario Scarabelli
- 162 Imola Autostazione-San Benedetto
- 163 Imola Autostazione-Istituto Alberghetti-Guicciardini
- 164 Via Mascagni-Pedagna Ovest-Istituto Alberghetti-Guicciardini
- 165 San Benedetto-Istituto Alberghetti-Imola Autostazione-Pasquala

==== Interurban School Routes ====
- 114 Ponte Quaderna-Castel San Pietro Terme Scuole
- 116 Medicina-Castel San Pietro Terme
- 145 Castel del Rio-Firenzuola
- 231 Mondonuovo Deposito-Baricella-Granarolo dell'Emilia-Budrio
- 247 Imola Autostazione-Castel San Pietro Terme-Villafontana
- 358 Molinella-Alberino-Mondonuovo-Baricella-Altedo
- 442 San Marino di Bentivoglio-Bentivoglio-Castel Maggiore
- 444 Castel Maggiore-Granarolo dell'Emilia
- 506 Bonconvento-San Giovanni in Persiceto
- 507 Osteria Nuova Stazione Ferroviaria-San Giovanni in Persiceto
- 654 Savigno-Monteveglio-Bazzano-Vignola
- 689 Ponte Rivabella-Loghetti
- 851 Rioveggio-A1 Motorway-Casalecchio di Reno (Direct Route)

==== Prontobus Routes ====
Prontobus routes are some bus routes which require reservation at least 24h before for some, most or all of their services:

- Whilst not being considered a Prontobus per se, Route 54 has also some services to the Bologna Airport Hotel and the parkings which require a reservation 24h before
- 147 Dozza Imolese-Toscanella di Dozza
- 431 Boschi-Baricella-Minerbio-Ospedale di Bentivoglio
- 432 Malalbergo-Altedo-Saletto-Ospedale di Bentivoglio
- 433 Galliera-San Pietro in Casale-San Giorgio di Piano-Ospedale di Bentivoglio
- 434 Malalbergo-Altedo-San Pietro in Casale
- 435 Pieve di Cento-Castello d'Argile-Argelato-San Giorgio di Piano-Ospedale di Bentivoglio
- 436 Trebbo di Reno-Castel Maggiore-Funo-Ospedale di Bentivoglio
- 437 Pontica-Granarolo dell'Emilia-Ospedale di Bentivoglio
- 533 Anzola dell'Emilia-Le Budrie-San Giovanni in Persiceto
- 536 Caselle-Palata Pepoli-San Giovanni in Persiceto-Ospedale di San Giovanni in Persiceto
- 537 Bevilacqua-Crevalcore-San Giovanni in Persiceto-Ospedale di San Giovanni in Persiceto
- 538 San Giovanni in Persiceto-Sant'Agata Bolognese-Nonantola

=== Former Routes of the Bologna Basin ===
==== Urban ====
- BLQ Stazione Centrale-Ospedale Maggiore-Aeroporto (replaced in November 2020 by the Marconi Express and by route 944)
- 14N Mille-Muratore (night bus)
- 17 Piazza Roosevelt-Sostegno (replaced by route 30 in 2012)
- 20C Pilastro-Rotonda Malaguti ITIS
- 20N Mille-Facolta' di Agraria-San Sisto (night bus)
- 25N Mille-Dozza-Gomito (night bus)
- T1 Piazza di Porta Ravegnana-Ospedale Malpighi
- 944 Ospedale Maggiore-Santa Viola-Via Battindarno-Pontelungo-Via Triumvirato-Aeroporto (replaced in May 2025 by route Q)

==== Suburban ====
- 95 Pontelungo/Via Marconi-Corticella-Funo/Centergross-Interporto/Saletto

==== Interurban ====
- 136 Imola-Zona Industriale Ponte Quaderna (withdrawn in September 2021, replaced by routes 131 and 132)
- 443 Funo-Zona Industriale Ca' de Fabbri (withdrawn in September 2026, replaced by route 449)
- 659 Goccia-Savigno-Castelletto di Serravalle-Monteveglio-Bazzano-Crespellano-Calcara-Ponte Samoggia FS (withdrawn between 2019 and 2020)
- 825 Grizzana Stazione Ferroviaria-San Benedetto Val di Sambro-Brasimone Enea

== Bus Routes Ferrara Basin ==
=== Ferrara Urban Routes ===
- 1 Stazione FS-Cedri-Frutteti-Stazione FS
- 1C Stazione FS-Frutteti-Centro Commerciale Le Mura-Stazione FS
- 2 Barco-Stazione FS-Viale Olanda
- 3 Stazione FS-Palestro-Corso Porta Reno-Rivana-Barlaam-Stazione FS
- 4 Stazione FS-Barlaam-Rivana-Corso Porta Reno-Montebello-Stazione FS
- 6 Porotto-Stazione FS-Ospedale di Cona
- 6C Ospedale di Cona-Cona-Stazione FS-Porotto
- 6/ Ospedale di Cona/Cona-Stazione FS
- 7 Malborghetto-Cavour-Scalambra-Via Trenti
- 7F Francolino-Malborghetto-Cavour-Scalambra-Via Trenti
- 9 Stazione FS-Eligio Mari-Pontegradella
- 9B Stazione FS-Eligio Mari-Pontegradella-Boara
- 9/ Stazione FS-Eligio Mari
- 11A Santa Maria Maddalena-Chiesuol del Fosso
- 11B Vallelunga-Bologna ex Dazio
- 13 Focomorto-Malborghetto-Rampari San Rocco-Cavour-Dante
- 15 Stazione FS-Fiera di Ferrara
- 21 Stazione FS-Cavour-Kennedy-Stazione FS
- 66 Stazione FS-Ospedale di Cona Degenze Ingresso 1 (UNIFE)
- 323 Quartesana-Codrea-Cona-Alfonso I d'Este-Aguscello
- 347 Kennedy-San Bartolomeo in Bosco
- 397 Vallelunga-Stazione FS-Bologna ex Dazio

=== Ferrara School Routes ===
- 13 Via Pioppa-Viale Cavour
- 13 Via Pavone-Via Pioppa
- 348 Kennedy-Spinazzino
- 360 Borgo Fondo Reno-Porotto-Giovecca
- 390 Via Leopardi/Piazzale Dante-Stazione FS/Darsena Provvisoria/Rampari San Rocco
- 391 Autostazione/Stazione FS-Polo Scolastico Via Canapa
- 392 Autostazione/Stazione FS-Polo Scolastico ITI
- 393 Via Darsena/Stazione FS-Polo Scolastico Via Barlaam
- 394 Via Darsena/Stazione FS-Istituto Navarra
- 395 Servizio Scuola Media Bonati/Servizio Scuola San Luca

=== Ferrara Interurban Routes ===
==== Interurban Routes Serving Ferrara ====
- 310 Ferrara-Francolino-Ro-Alberone-Copparo
- 311 Ferrara-Boara-Ro-Alberone-Copparo
- 312 Ferrara-Boara-Copparo-Ariano-Goro
- 314 Ferrara-Pontegradella-Saletta-Copparo-Ariano-Goro
- 320 Ferrara-Formignana-Tresigallo-Ambrogio
- 321 Ferrara-Fossalta-Parasacco
- 322 Ferrara-Tresigallo-Jolanda-Ariano-Codigoro
- 326 Ferrara-Massafiscaglia-Lagosanto-Vaccolino
- 330/331 Ferrara-Ostellato-Comacchio-Porto Garibaldi-Lido degli Estensi-Lido di Spina-Lido delle Nazioni
- 340 Ferrara-Cona-Quartesana-Masi San Giacomo
- 342 Ferrara-Voghiera-Portomaggiore
- 344 Ferrara-San Nicolò-Argenta-Longastrino-Anita
- 345 Ferrara-San Nicolò-Molinella-Santa Maria Codifiume
- 346 Alberino-Codifiume-Passo Segni-Ferrara
- 354 Bologna-Altedo-Gallo
- 356 Ferrara-Gallo-Malalbergo-Altedo-Bologna
- 360/361/370 Ferrara-Poggio Renatico-Cento-Casumaro-Finale Emilia
- 371/372/373 (San Martino in Spino)-Malcantone-Bondeno-Ferrara / Bondeno-Stellata-Ficarolo-Salara
- 373 San Martino in Spino-Pilastri-Bondeno
- 374 Ferrara-Ravalle-Bondeno-San Martino in Spino
- 375 Ferrara-Diamantina-Bondeno-San Martino in Spino
- 460 Ferrara-Bentivoglio
- 550 Ferrara-Mirabello-Cento

==== Interurban Routes not serving Ferrara ====
- 315 Copparo-Ambrogio-Jolanda
- 316 Massafiscaglia-Tresigallo-Copparo-Cesta
- 319 Copparo-Massafiscaglia-Lidi Ferraresi (Summer Seasonal Route)
- 328 Tresigallo-Rovereto-Ostellato-Portomaggiore
- 332 Codigoro-Comacchio-Lido delle Nazioni-Porto Garibaldi-Ravenna
- 333 Codigoro-Comacchio-Porto Garibaldi-Ravenna
- 334 Lido delle Nazioni-Porto Garibaldi-Ravenna
- 335 Codigoro-Gorino
- 336 Lido di Volano-Abbazia di Pomposa-Codigoro-Ariano
- 337 Codigoro-Lido di Volano
- 338 Longastrino-Alfonsine-Mezzano-Lido degli Estensi Centro Scolastico
- 339 Gorino-Bosco della Mesola-Mesola-Ariano-Adria
- 349 Working days morning gone: Portomaggiore-Porto Garibaldi / Working days afternoon return: Lido di Spina-Portomaggiore / Sundays: Voghenza-Lido di Spina
- 363 Bondeno-Scortichino-Finale Emilia
- 364 Bondeno-Mirabello-Finale Emilia-Cento-Bologna
- 366 Bondeno-Quatrina-Finale Emilia-Pilastrello-Cento
- 551 Cento-Crevalcore-Modena
- 552 Cento-San Giovanni in Persiceto-Modena
