= BredaMenarinibus =

Former bus manufacturer in Italy

- Industry: Engineering
- Founded: 1989; 37 years ago
- Fate: Defunct 2015
- Successor: Industria Italiana Autobus
- Headquarters: Bologna, Italy
- Products: Buses; Trolleybuses]

BredaMenarinibus S.p.A. was a bus manufacturer based in Bologna, Italy. The company was established in 1989 through the merger of Bredabus, the bus and coach divisions of Breda Costruzioni Ferroviarie, heir of the consortium Inbus (Industrie Autobus), and Carrozzeria Menarini, established in 1919 in Bologna, anticipating those processes of industrial aggregation that would characterize the bus sector as well as that of industrial vehicles.

== History ==
=== Carrozzeria Menarini ===
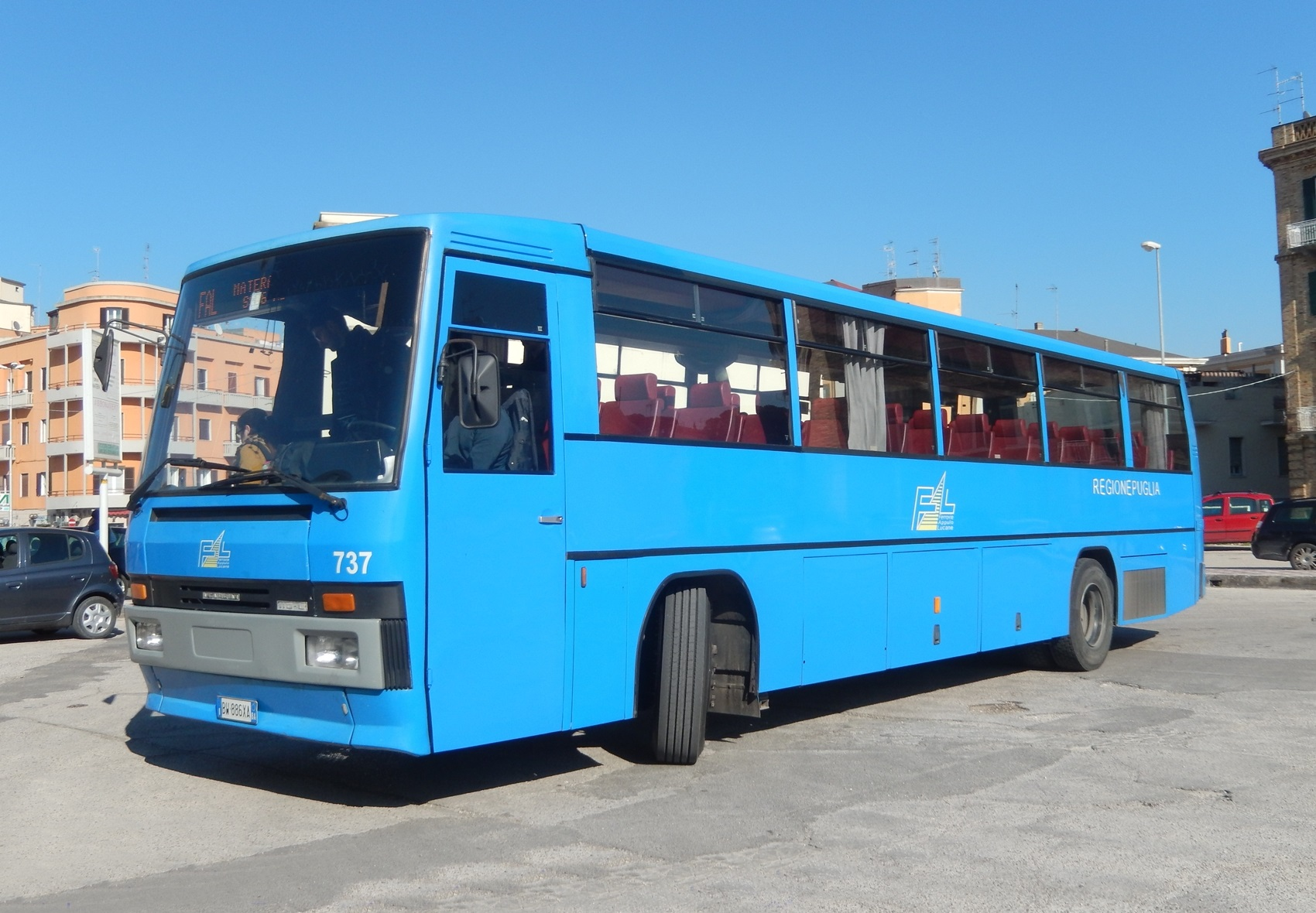
Ferrovie Appulo Lucane Menarini Monocar 110

Menarini was established 1919 by Ettore Menarini in Bologna which main activity was the construction of horse-drawn omnibuses, an artisan work that required time and precision. The company began in the 1920s, in collaboration with FIAT, the production of coachwork for collective transport and industrial uses as workshop wagons, ambulances, special vans and buses. During the bombing of Bologna in World War II the factory went destroyed; only in 1946 Menarini restarted the activity producing buses only; with 230 workers produced eight vehicles a month. In the half of the 1950s the production was transferred in a new factory, still in use, in a suburban area; the new plant was built to meet the modern processing needs.

At the beginning of the 1960s was projected and built the coach SDM (Sintesi del Meglio) a milestone in styling and construction techniques. A successful range of buses were built in the 1970s: the Monocar 201 was fit for urban and suburban services, while Monocar 110, Monocar 120 for intercity scheduled services. In the 1980s the company developed and projected low-floor urban buses building the Monocar 220. Due to financial problems the company sold some shares to Breda Costruzioni Ferroviarie whose contribution would have served to modernise the company, later some disagreements with the new management led to the exit of the Menarini family from the new company.

=== Bredabus ===
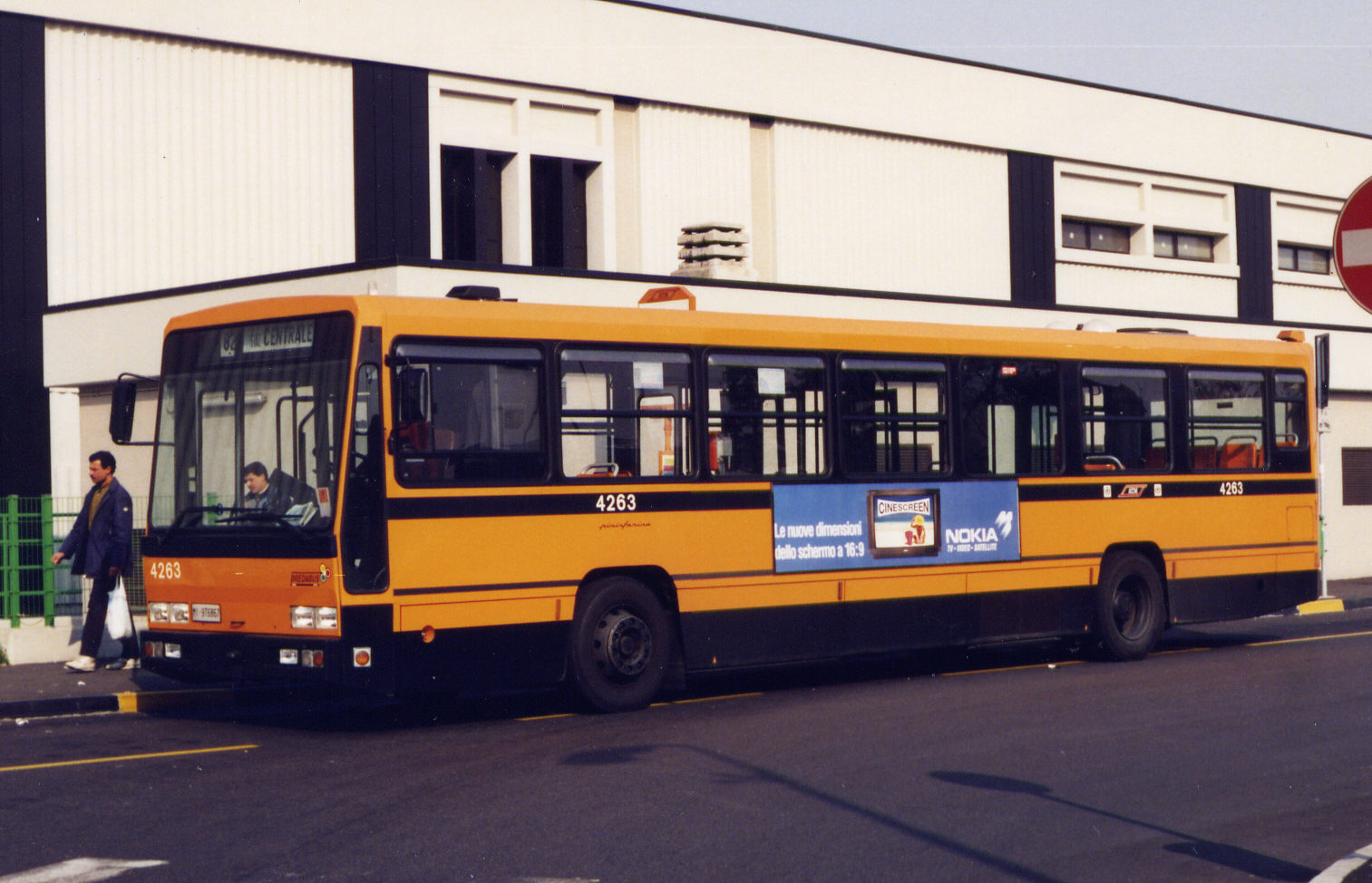
ATM BredaBus 2001

Bredabus was formed in 1987 when the consortium Inbus, established in 1977, closed. The new company was formed by Breda Costruzioni Ferroviarie (45%) of Pistoia and Sofer (20%) of Naples both of the EFIM group.

Bredabus continued to build some Inbus models until 1993 with the inscription Bredabus mod.Inbus. The new consortium projected and built three new models, Bredabus 2001 and Bredabus 3001 (urban), Bredabus 4001 (trolleybus), Bredabus 5001 (suburban), characterized by a modern style designed by Pininfarina made of aluminium alloy or steel.

=== BredaMenarinibus ===
The new company, that chose a red horse as trademark, passed under the control of Finmeccanica acquiring the necessary resources to develop a range of new buses. BredaMenarinibus produced models in the urban segment such as Monocar 221, Monocar 230, Monocar 321, Monocar 340 while in 1997 began the production of low-floor bus as Monocar 231 and Monocar 240 featuring high technical and design solutions. Particular attention was taken to development of a low-emission vehicle, producing a modern style electric minibus, named ZEUS (Zero Emission Urban System), suitable for the historic centre and sold to some European countries as France, Germany, The Netherlands, Switzerland and Spain.

=== Industria Italiana Autobus ===
On 20 November 2014, an agreement was signed at the Ministry of Economic Development between Finmeccanica and King Long Italia for the sale of BredaMenarinibus to Industria Italiana Autobus (IIA), owned by King Long Italia (80%) and by Finmeccanica (20%) rebranding the new company with the historical name Menarinibus acquiring the former Irisbus production plant in Flumeri. On 24 January 2018, the first twenty Menarinibus Citymood buses, equipped with the new Euro 6 engines, were delivered to TPER of Bologna.

In 2024, the Italian government announced that it would fully withdraw from the company, transferring 71.4% of the shares to Seri Industria SpA.

== Production ==
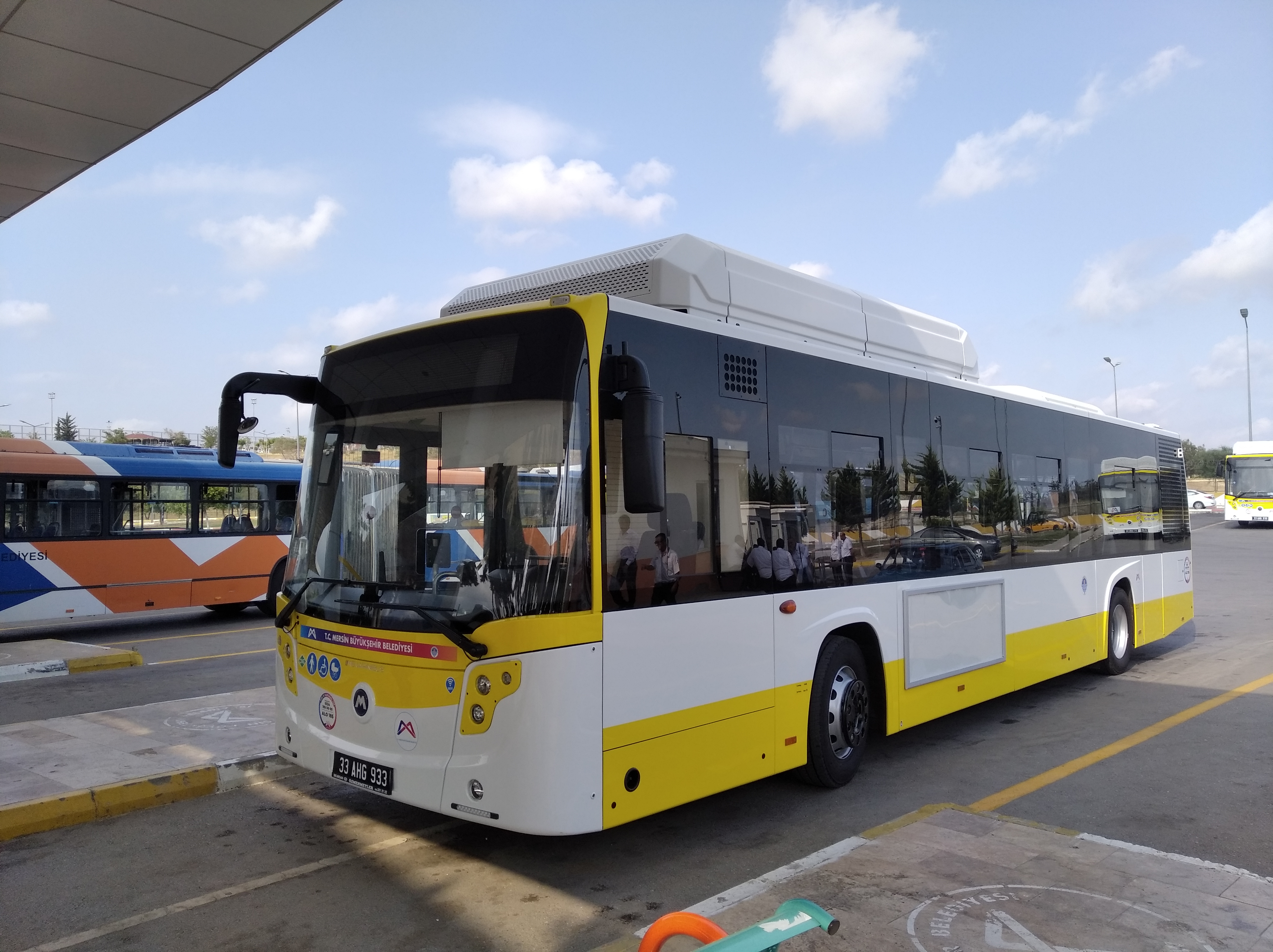
Citymood 12 CNG produced by Karsan under license, at city transit service in Mersin, Turkey

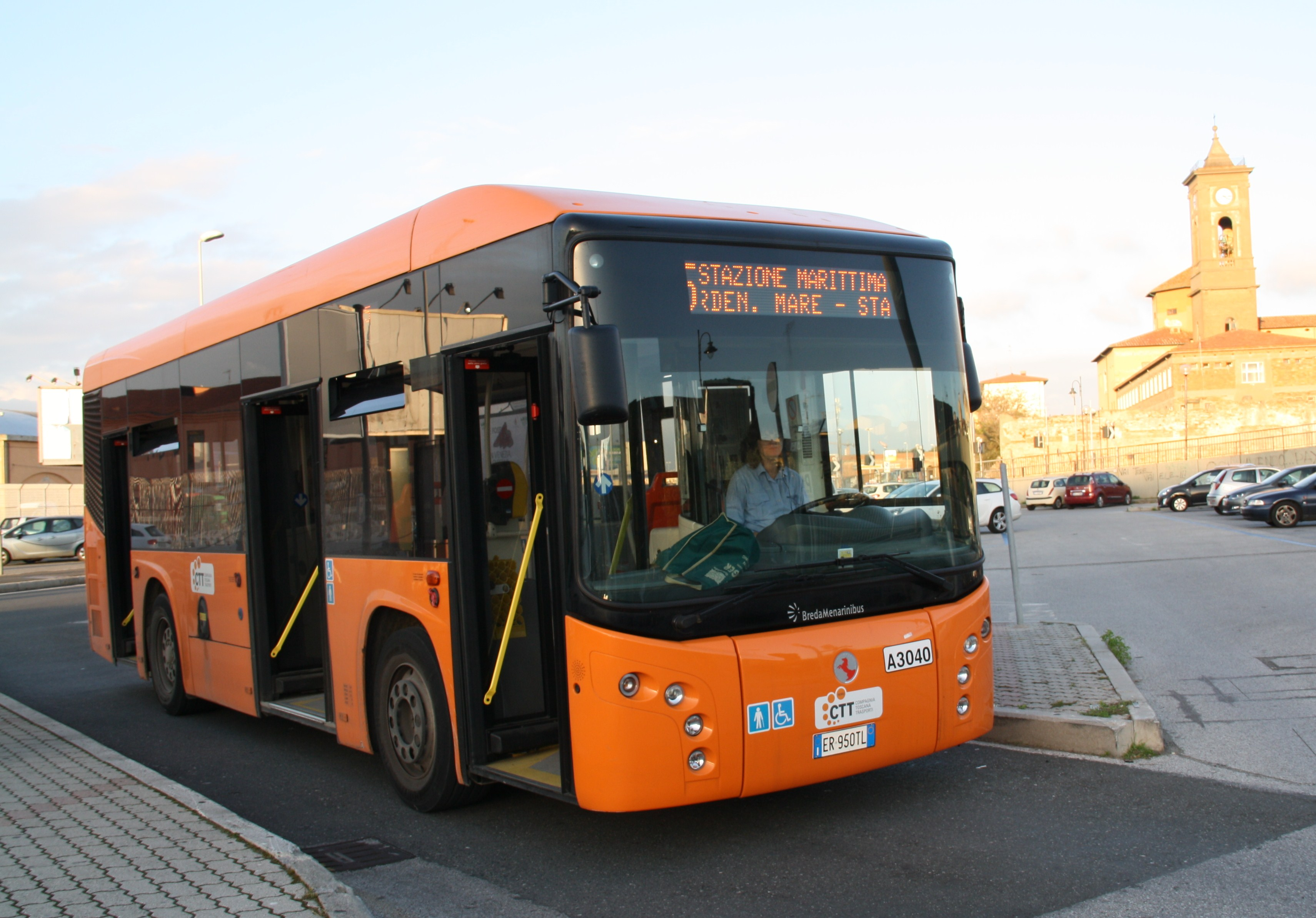
CTT Nord BredaMenarinibus Vivacity

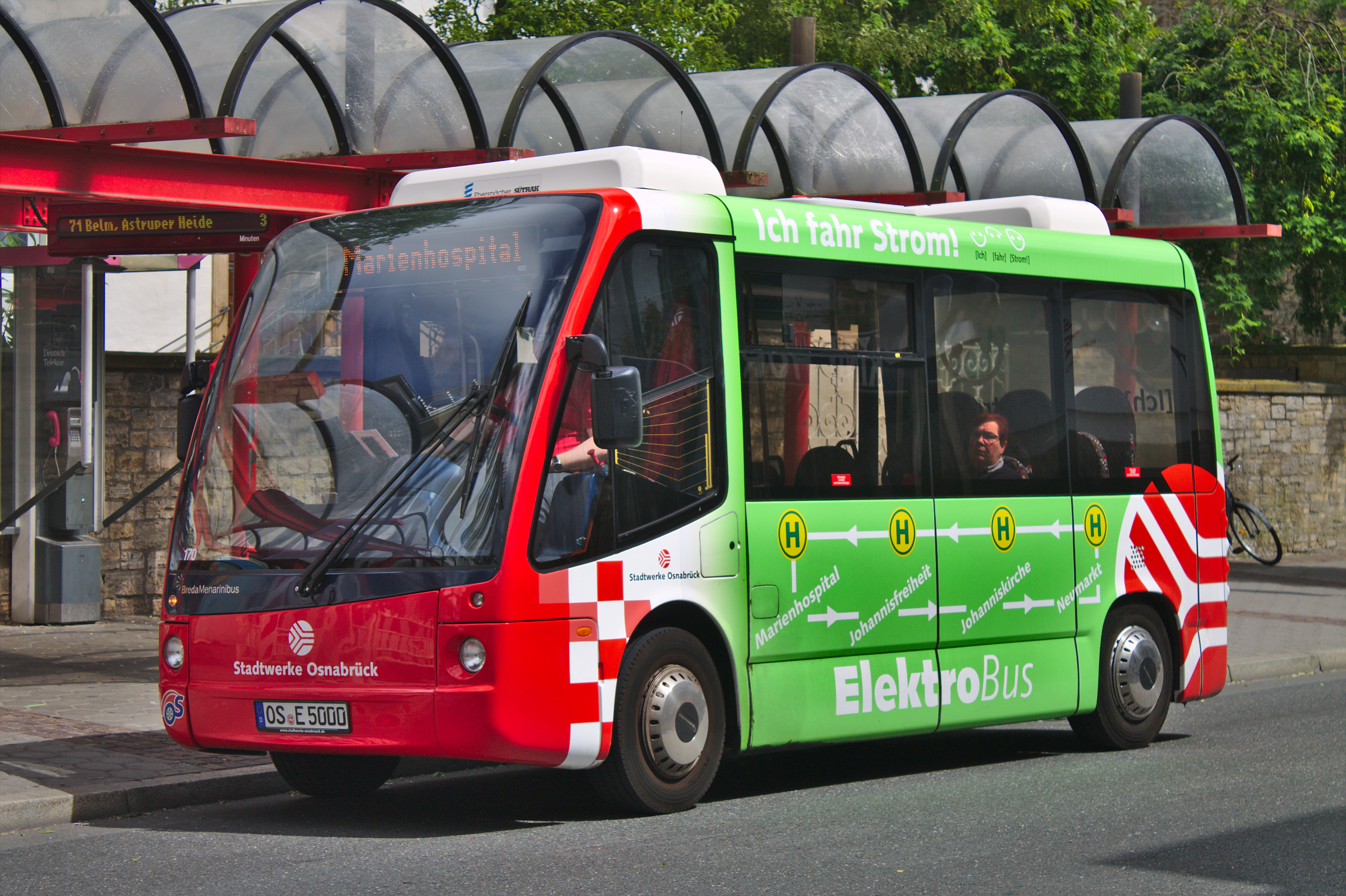
Stadtwerke Osnabrück BredaMenarinibus ZEUS

Below is a summary of BredaMenarinibus production:

Buses

- Avancity (2004-2008)
- Avancity+ (2008-2013)
- Citymood (2013-2015)
- Lander (2008-2013)
- Monocar 120 (1990-2001)
- Monocar 220 (1990-1999)
- Monocar 221 (1995-1998)
- Monocar 240 (1998-2004)

Articulated buses

- Avancity 18 (2004-2013)
- Monocar 321 (1995-1998)
- Monocar 340 (1998-2005)

Trolleybuses

- AnsaldoBreda F19
- AnsaldoBreda F22

Articulated trolleybuses

- Avancity+ HTB (2009)

Minibuses

- Monocar 230 (1993-1998)
- Monocar 231 (2000-2005)
- Vivacity (2005-2015)
- Zeus (electric) (2001-2013)

== See also ==
- List of buses
