= Iveco EuroClass =

Italian intercity bus

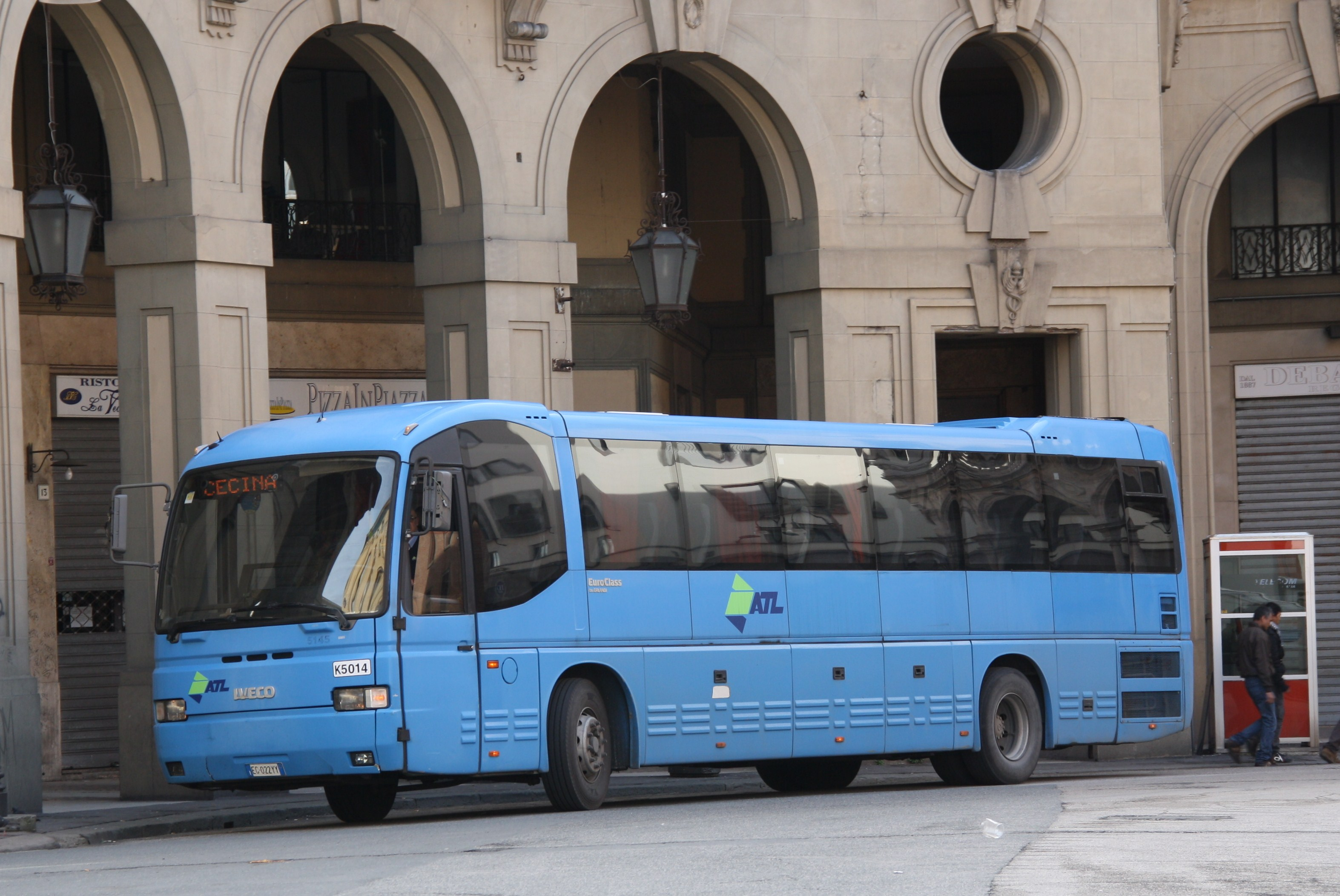
ATL Iveco EuroClass in Livorno, Italy

The Iveco EuroClass is an Italian intercity coach produced by Iveco starting from 1993 as a replacement of Iveco 370.

It was built in two versions, EuroClass HD, with a length of 12.0 meters and 3.56 m high, and EuroClass Normal, in the lengths of 10.5 and 12 meters. The HD version won the Coach of the Year 1995 award in 1994. The bus was produced on the Iveco 380 chassis until 2001, having a FIAT 8460.41S engine with 350 HP (Normal) or 380 HP (HD). The units built after 2002 were marketed under the Irisbus brand and named EuroClass NEW, and were based on the Irisbus 389 chassis, with am Iveco Cursor or Renault engine with 350 HP in the Normal version, or 430 HP in the HD version.

The bus was used by numerous transportation companies in Italy, such as Latium's Cotral (several hundreds), SITA (trasporti), Azienda Trasporti Livornese, Autolinee Regionali Pubbliche Abruzzesi, as well as the Esercito Italiano, the Carabinieri, the Guardia di Finanza and the Vigili del Fuoco. Some units were also sold in France and in Eastern Europe. The production of EuroClass stopped in 2007.

== See also ==
- List of buses
