= Imola railway station =

Railway station in Italy

Coordinates: 44°21′33″N 11°43′08″E

Imola
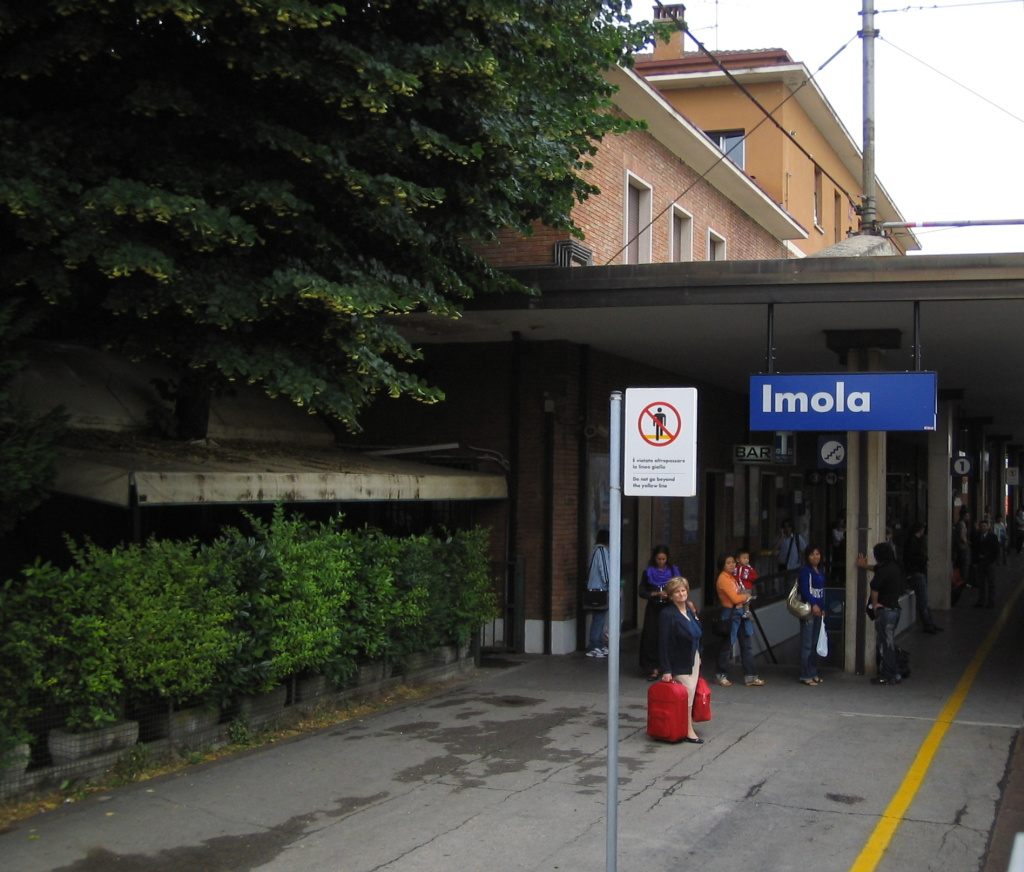
- View of the station as seen from a train on track no. 1

General information
- Location: Piazza Marabini 7, Imola; Italy
- Owner: Rete Ferroviaria Italiana
- Operator: Rete Ferroviaria Italiana
- Line: Bologna–Ancona
- Distance: 34.056 kilometres (21.161 mi) from Bologna Centrale
Location
- Location within Emilia-Romagna Location within Northern Italy Location within Italy

Imola railway station (Italian: stazione di Imola) is a railway station serving Imola, in the region of Emilia–Romagna, in northern Italy. It lies on the Bologna–Ancona railway.

== Services ==
The station is the eastern terminus of Line S4B on the Bologna metropolitan railway service.

== Passenger and train movements ==
In 2007, the daily ridership amounted to 2,233 passengers. In 2018, the average number of passengers departing from the station daily has been estimated at 2,894 passengers per day.

== Bibliography ==
- Rete Ferroviaria Italiana, Fascicolo Linea 84.
