= Irisbus Arway =

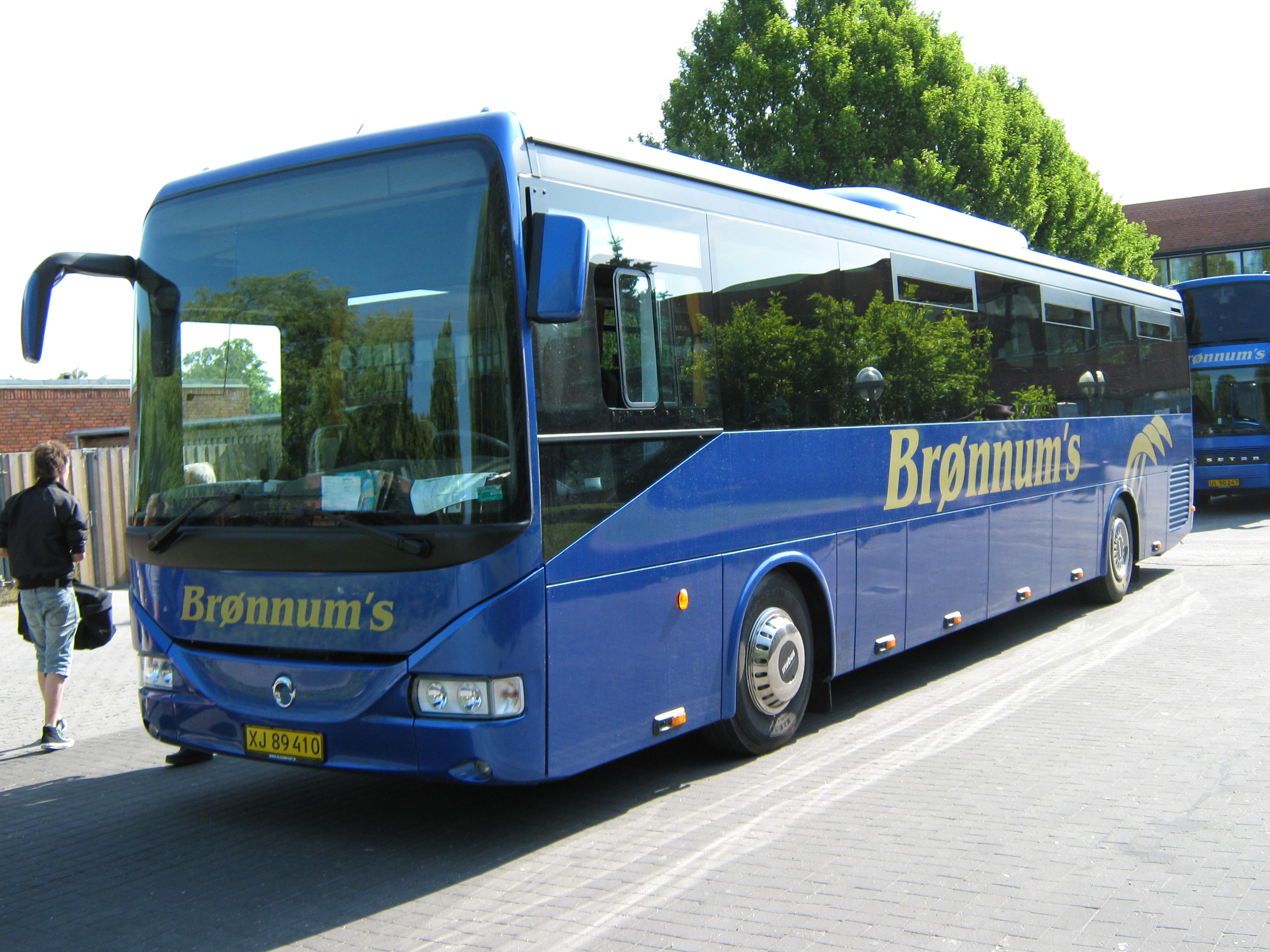
- Irisbus_Arway_Brønnums_Turistfart_front.jpg

Overview
- Manufacturer: Italy Irisbus
- Model years: 2006 - 2013

Body and chassis
- Body style: Intercity
- Doors: 2

Powertrain
- Engine: Iveco Cursor 8 (L6) diesel 8000 cm³ 310 cv

Dimensions
- Length: 10.6 m (34.8 ft); 12 m (39.4 ft); 12.8 m (42.0 ft); 14.9 m (48.9 ft)
- Width: 2.55 m (8.4 ft)
- Height: 3.45 m (11.3 ft)
- Curb weight: 9,500 kg (20,900 lb); 12,000 kg (26,000 lb)

Chronology
- Predecessor: Iveco MyWay
- Successor: Irisbus Crossway

The Irisbus Arway (SFR160) is a class of single-decker intercity buses produced by Irisbus in Vysoké Mýto, Czech Republic.

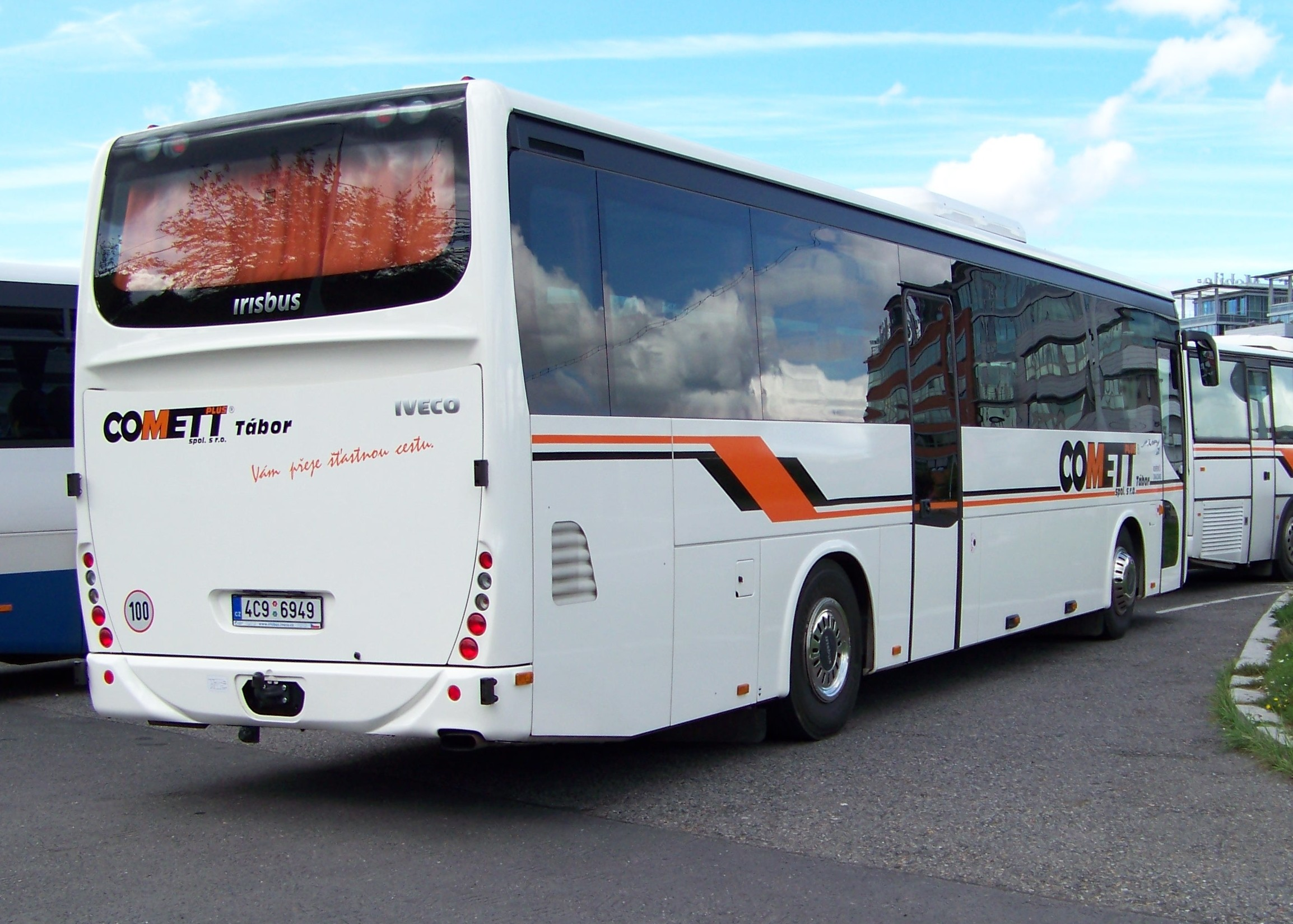
Irisbus Arway rear in June 2009

The Arway was a single-decker coach for suburban routes. The bus was designed to replace the MyWay (original Iveco model) and the Ares (original Renault model), whence came the name Arway. The Arway was equipped with a heating and air conditioning (HVAC) system, music and announcement system and also, optionally, a wheelchair lift. It has two doors, with the central one available in single or double width.

The engine was an IVECO Cursor 8, Euro IV standard, with a 7,880 cc displacement, developing 330 or 380 hp, depending on the version. The first Arways were delivered in France in 2006. In Italy, the model is in service with public transport companies at Piacenza, Ferrara, Brescia, Lodi, Rome and Naples and in Spain can be found with various public transport companies including Madrid.

== See also ==
- List of buses
