= Mercedes-Benz Cito =

Mercedes-Benz Cito O520
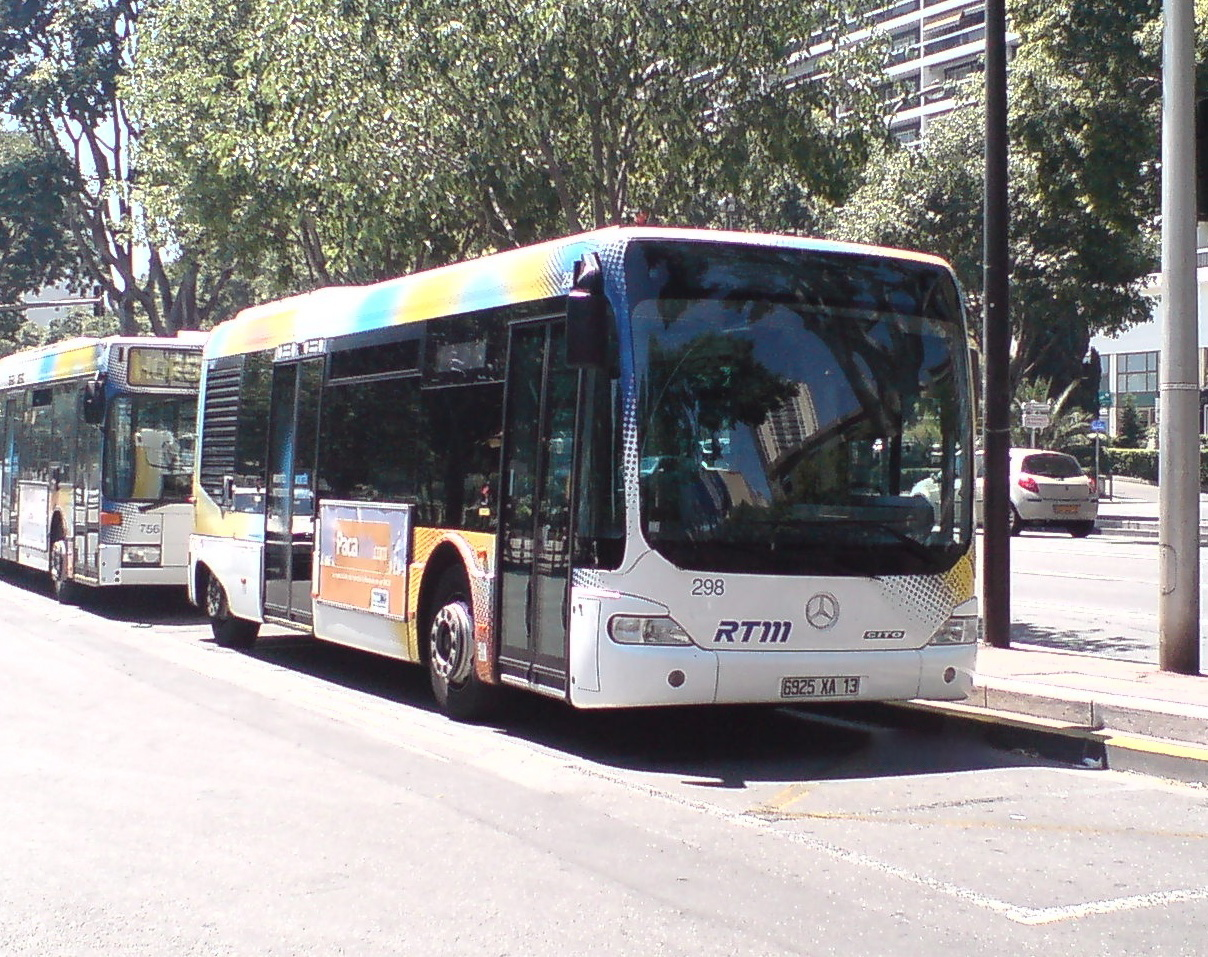
- Mercedes-Benz Cito (O520)

Overview
- Manufacturer: Mercedes-Benz
- Production: 1999–2003
- Assembly: Germany: Mannheim (EvoBus)

Body and chassis
- Class: Midibus
- Doors: 2
- Floor type: Low floor
- Chassis: 160(169.031.169.331)

Powertrain
- Engine: OM 904 Euro 2,125kw,2300 rpm
- Capacity: 12/16/20 seats
- Power output: 85 kW (114 hp)
- Transmission: Diesel-electric

Dimensions
- Length: 8.1 metres (26 ft 6 7/8 in), 8.9 metres (29 ft 2 3/8 in), 9.6 metres (31 ft 6 in)
- Width: 2,350 mm (7 ft 8 1/2 in)
- Height: 2,950 mm (9 ft 8 1/8 in)
- Curb weight: 12120

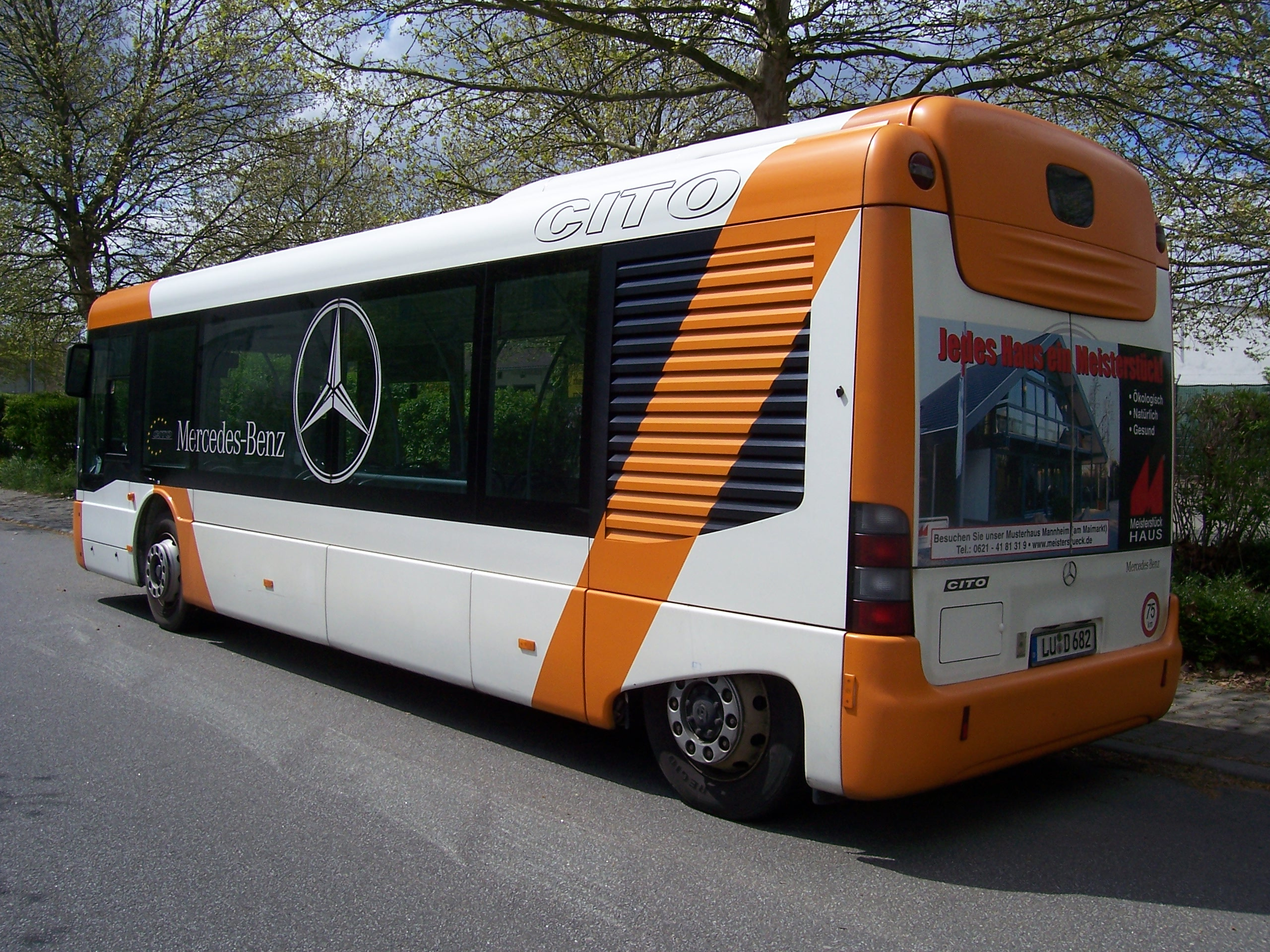
Mercedes-Benz Cito rear

The Mercedes-Benz Cito (coded as O520) is a low-floor midibus built by EvoBus for Continental Europe between 1999 and 2003. Unusual for buses at that time, it had a diesel-electric transmission and was planned to have a hybrid engine or a fuel cell at a later stage. The Diesel engine was positioned above the rear axle.

The bus was available in three lengths: 8,100 mm, 8,900 mm, and 9,600 metre long and it has a width of 2,350 mm. It has a capacity ranged from 31 passengers, 34 passengers and 38 passengers. It was replaced by short wheelbase Mercedes-Benz Citaro K in 2006.

== See also ==
- List of buses
- Media related to Mercedes-Benz Cito at Wikimedia Commons
