= Iveco MyWay =

Iveco 393/399 MyWay
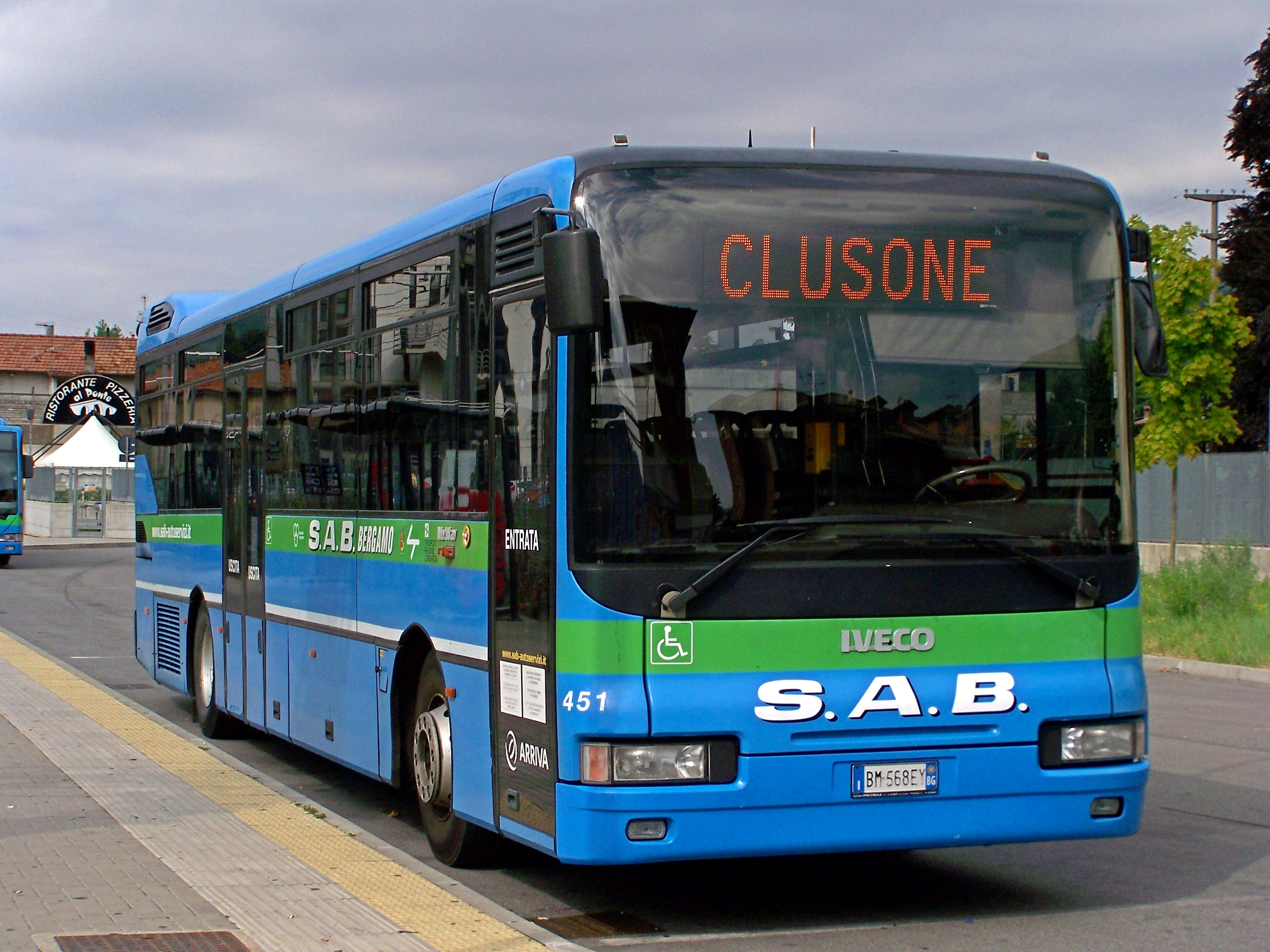

Overview
- Manufacturer: Italy Iveco; EU Irisbus
- Model years: 1999 - 2007
- Designer: Giorgetto Giugiaro

Body and chassis
- Body style: Suburban bus
- Doors: 2

Powertrain
- Engine: Iveco 8360.46 diesel 7685 cm³ 220/266 cv Iveco 8469.21 CNG 9500 cm³ 240 cv Iveco Cursor 8 7790 cm³ 289/352 cv

Dimensions
- Length: 12 metres
- Width: 2.5 metres
- Height: 3.1 metres
- Curb weight: 10 930 / 12 340

Chronology
- Predecessor: Iveco EuroRider
- Successor: Irisbus Arway

The Iveco MyWay (later known as Irisbus MyWay) is a class of buses produced by Iveco and then by Irisbus, from 1999 to 2007.

MyWay is a bus for extraurban routes. Designed to replace the Iveco EuroRider, it was produced in an only version with a length of 12 meters (39 ft 4 1/2 in), the only option regarding the central door, which could be single or double. Units produced from 1999 to 2001 had the IVECO brand, with a Fiat AIFO engine with a power of 350 hp (260 kW). Starting from 2002, the buses were provided with a new Cursor engine, with power of 310 or 352 hp (231 or 262 kW). The MyWay had 55 or 53 seats, depending from the type of the central door.

It was used in the Italian cities of Rimini, Livorno, Verona and Pisa.

The MyWay was replaced by the new Irisbus models Arway and Crossway in 2007.
