= Transport in Beirut =

Transport in Beirut consists of urban buses, minibuses and taxis, as well as interurban and international buses and air service.

== Urban ==
=== Buses ===
The Lebanese Commuting Company (LCC) is a privately owned company and offers one of a handful of intercity public transport options available in Beirut. There are LCC bus routes that cover much of the central areas as well as some suburban areas.

Government-owned buses are managed by le Office des Chemins de Fer et des Transports en Commun (OCFTC), or the "Railway and Public Transportation Authority" in English.

There are also private vans that serve as minibuses. Some of them run on official lines, but most run on additional routes.

Unfortunately, there are no official bus lines printed or online. The Beirut transport map on OpenStreetMap was the most accurate map available as of June 2015.

=== ACTC Public Bus Network ===
In 2024, Ahdab Commuting and Trading Company (ACTC), alongside the Ministry of Transport, reintroduced a proper public bus system with an appropriate network of lanes using the 50 buses donated by France in 2022. The network connects most areas of Beirut through 7 major lines (B1-7), as well as connecting Beirut to other major cities like Tripoli and Saida through 4 lines (ML1-4). However, these lines complement rather than replace the existing service microbuses.

=== Taxis and Uber ===
Apart from buses, passengers are served by either service taxi or taxicab.

Uber also operates in Beirut.

To avoid misunderstandings in service taxis, agreement over the pricing should be reached before departure.

== Intercity ==
=== Buses ===
An overland trans-desert bus service between Beirut, Haifa, Damascus and Baghdad was established by the Nairn Transport Company of Damascus in 1923; the Nairn brothers had established a Beirut to Haifa service in 1920. The closure of the Lebanese-Israeli border eliminated bus travel from Beirut to Haifa.

Beirut has bus connections to other cities in Lebanon and major cities in Syria. Buses for northern destinations and Syria depart from the Charles Helou Station and Dora. Buses to the Beqa' and the south leave from Cola.

=== Ferries ===
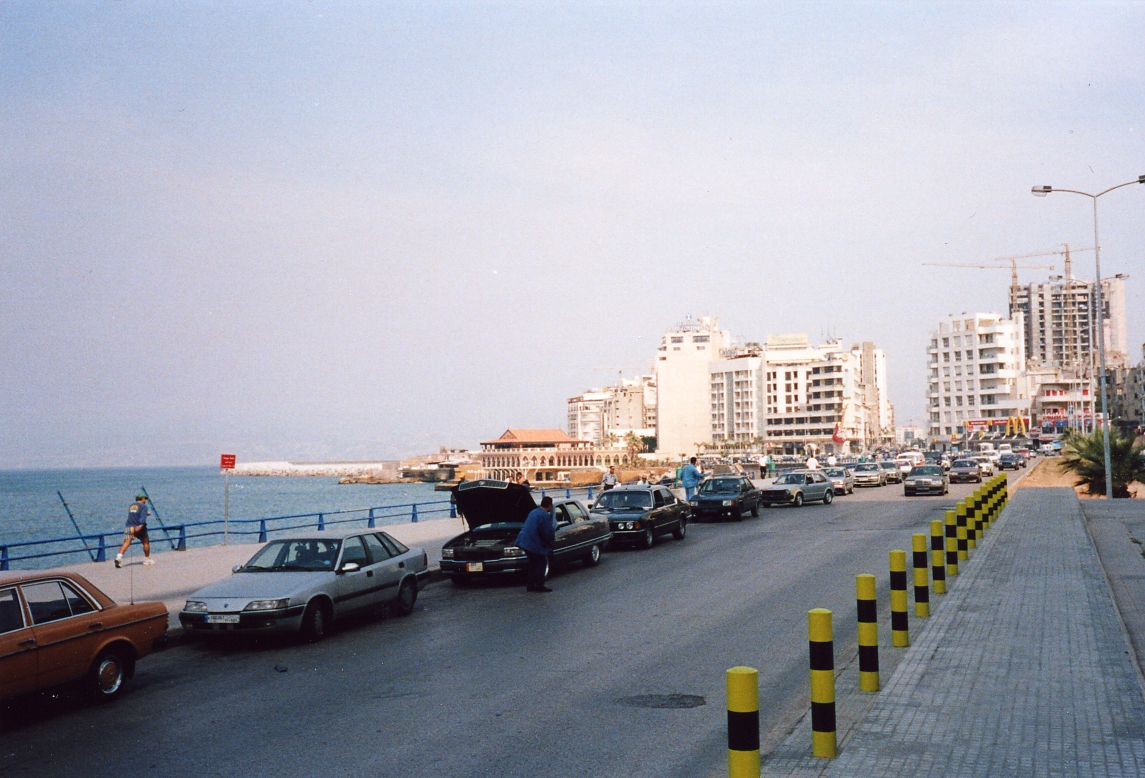

Presently (Jan 2017) major ferry websites list no services to Beirut.

=== Airport ===
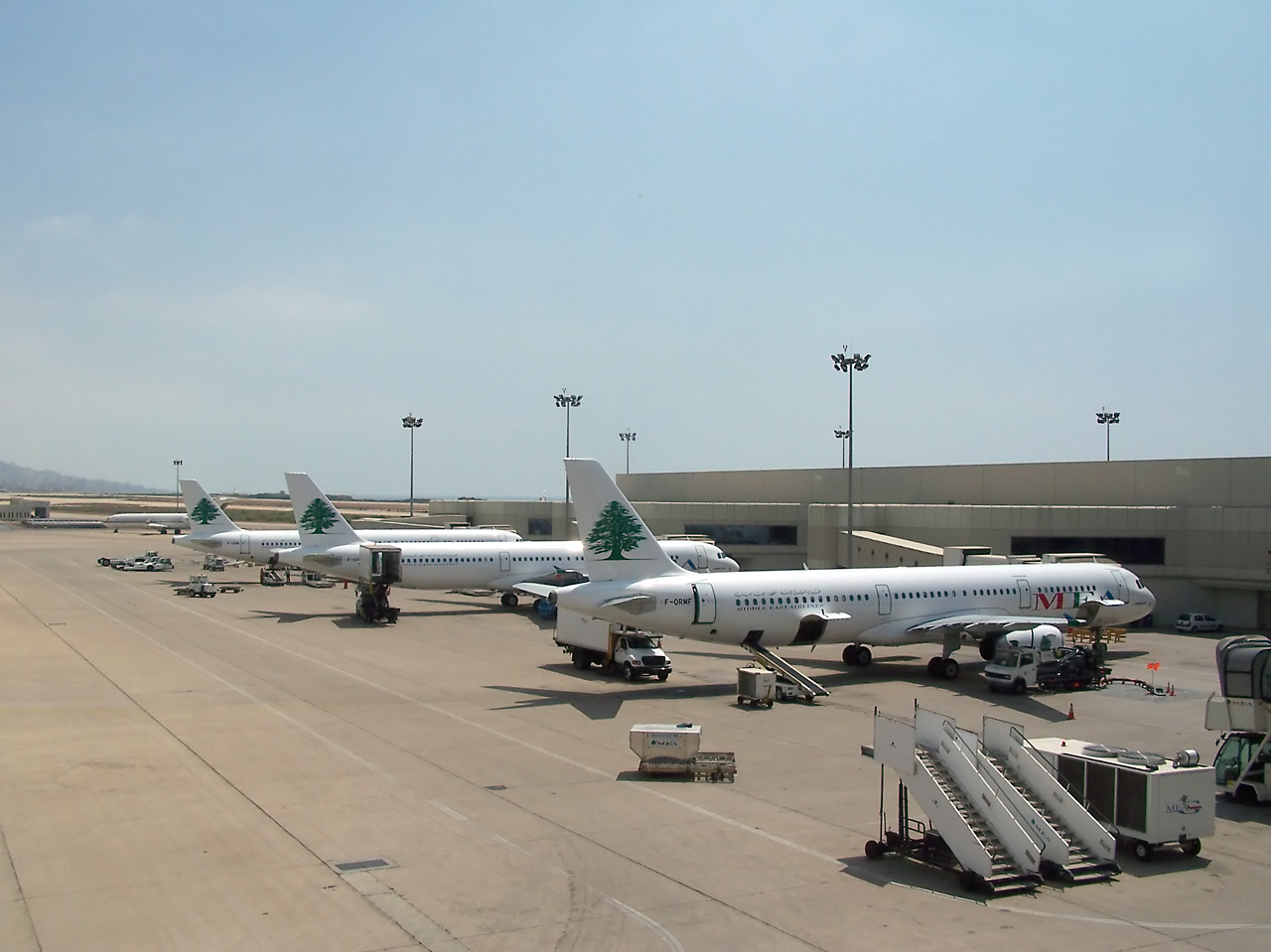
The Beirut Rafic Hariri International Airport, Beirut

The main national airport is the Beirut Rafic Hariri International Airport and is located south of Beirut, in Khaldeh. Opened in 1954, the airport was renovated in 1977, and the present runways were rehabilitated between 1982 and 1984.

=== Seaports ===
The Port of Beirut is the main port in Lebanon located in northern Beirut, and is one of the largest ports on the Eastern Mediterranean.
