= Irisbus Citelis =

Type of City bus

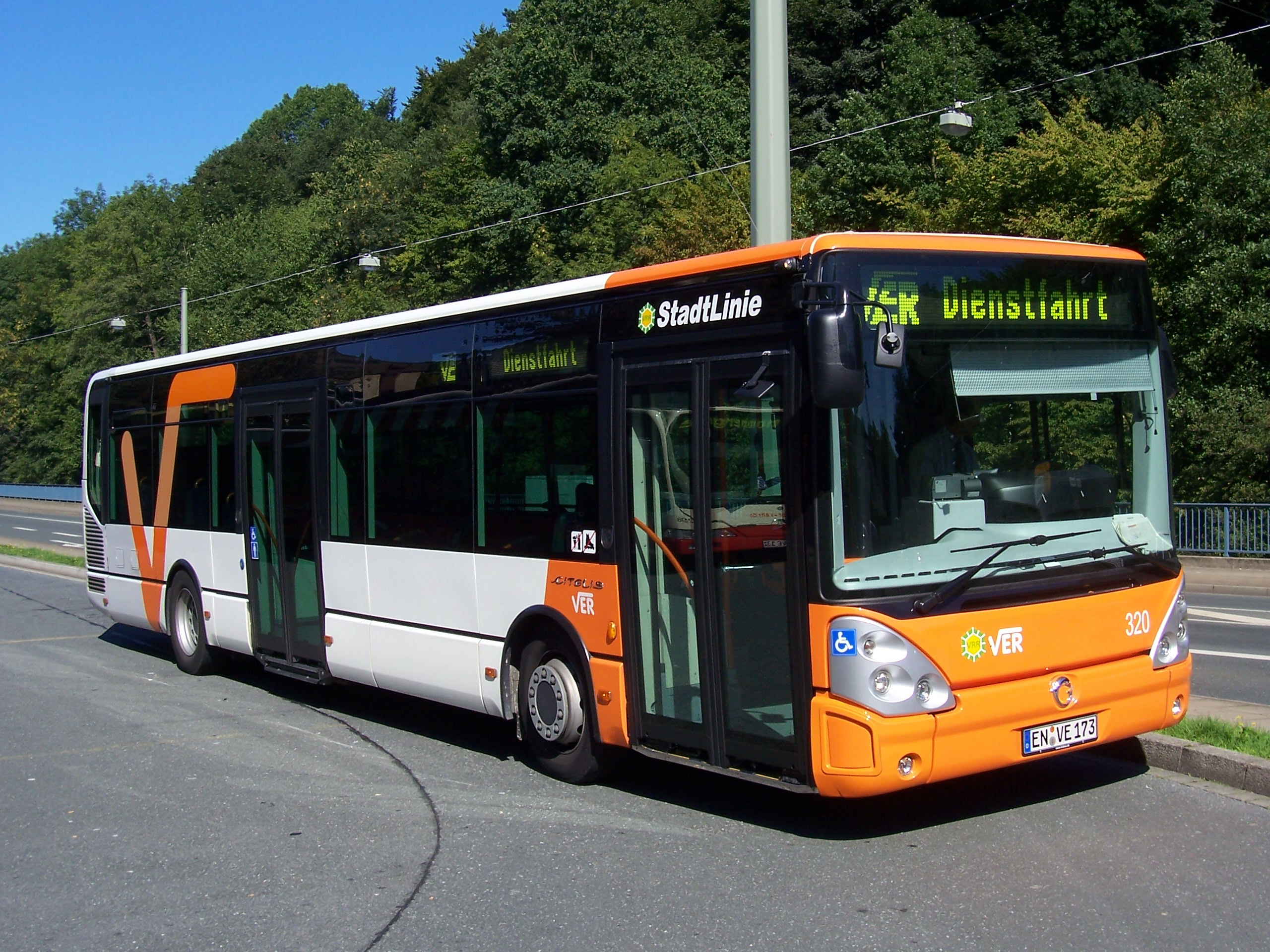
- Citelis Line bus in Germany's Ruhr area

Overview
- Manufacturer: Irisbus; Astra Bus
- Production: 2005-2013

Body and chassis
- Doors: 2 to 4
- Floor type: low floor

Powertrain
- Engine: Iveco Cursor 8
- Transmission: 4-speed automatic Voith DIWA

Dimensions
- Length: 10 m (32.8 ft); 12 m (39.4 ft); 18 m (59.1 ft)
- Width: 2.5 m (8.2 ft)
- Height: 2.8 m (9.2 ft); 3.3 m (10.8 ft)

Chronology
- Predecessor: Irisbus CityClass; Irisbus Agora
- Successor: Iveco Urbanway

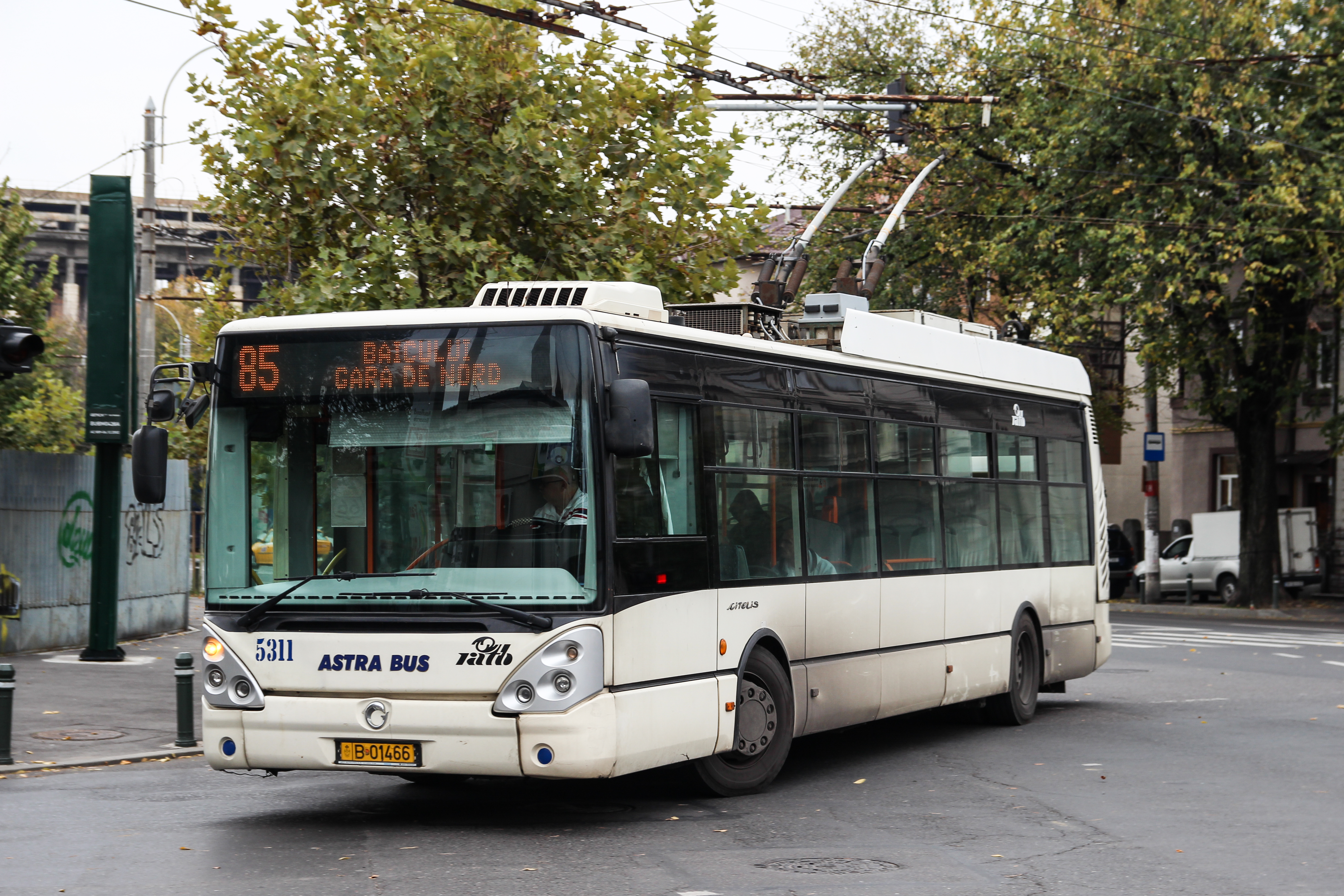
A 2007 Astra Citelis PS01T1 trolleybus produced in partnership with Astra Bus for Bucharest

The Irisbus Citelis is a low-floor city bus produced by Irisbus from 2005 to 2013 when it was replaced in production by the Iveco Urbanway.

== Production and operation ==
It was introduced in 2005 to replace the Agora. It comes in three varieties: Citelis 10 and Citelis 12, which are standard buses with respectively 10 m (33 ft) and 12 m (39 ft) length, and Citelis 18, which is articulated and has a length of 18 m (59 ft). Citelis models use Euro 4, Euro 5 & EEV engines. The buses can also be built as trolleybuses, utilising overhead electrical wires for their power supply instead of fuel. Trolleybus version of Citelis is also known as Škoda 24Tr Irisbus (12m) or Škoda 25Tr Irisbus (18m), especially in Eastern Europe.

== Transport ==
Citelis vehicles were introduced in 2007 on Bucharest's trolleybus network run by STB and in 2006 or 2007 in Riga, capital of Latvia, in which they are owned by Rīgas Satiksme. They are also used by the RATP in Paris, Germany's VER, in Brno and Prague, Czech Republic, by ATM in Milan, by ATAC in Rome, by Strætó bs in Reykjavík, by EMT-Palma in Mallorca Spain, in Nur-Sultan, Kazakhstan, TEC in Belgium, in Iceland, in Plovdiv, Bulgaria by Hebros Bus, in Greece by OASA and OASTH, in Varna, Bulgaria by Transtriumph Holding, in Lebanon by ACTC OCFTC and by DPMK in Košice and from 14.4.2011 also in SAD Trnava in Trnava, In 2012. year JGSP Novi Sad purchased 5 Irisbus Citelis 12 CNG models.

A Citelis 18 CNG chassis was converted to right-hand drive and bodied by Custom Coaches in 2008–2009. It is now being operated by Path Transit, who is one of three contractors that operates buses under the Transperth brand name in Perth, Western Australia.

== In popular culture ==
- In Disney films, such as Cars 2 and Planes: Fire & Rescue, an Irisbus Citelis appears as characters such as Emmanuel, Chris Compass, Linus Lines, Trudy Trailway, and Valerie Vistaview. Emmanuel is a bus that appears in Paris, amidst traffic. He waits impatiently behind Tow Mater, who struggles to enter the Arc de Triomphe roundabout without colliding with other cars. It is painted primarily blue, with white and red lines on the sides representing the French flag. It also includes two yellow stripes. One of the yellow stripes on each side has the Parisian Car Tours trademark written in red.
- In Planes: Fire & Rescue, they lack the traditional Irisbus emblem on their fronts.

== See also ==
- List of buses
