= Ikarus 415T =

Trolleybus produced by Hungarian bus manufacturer, Ikarus

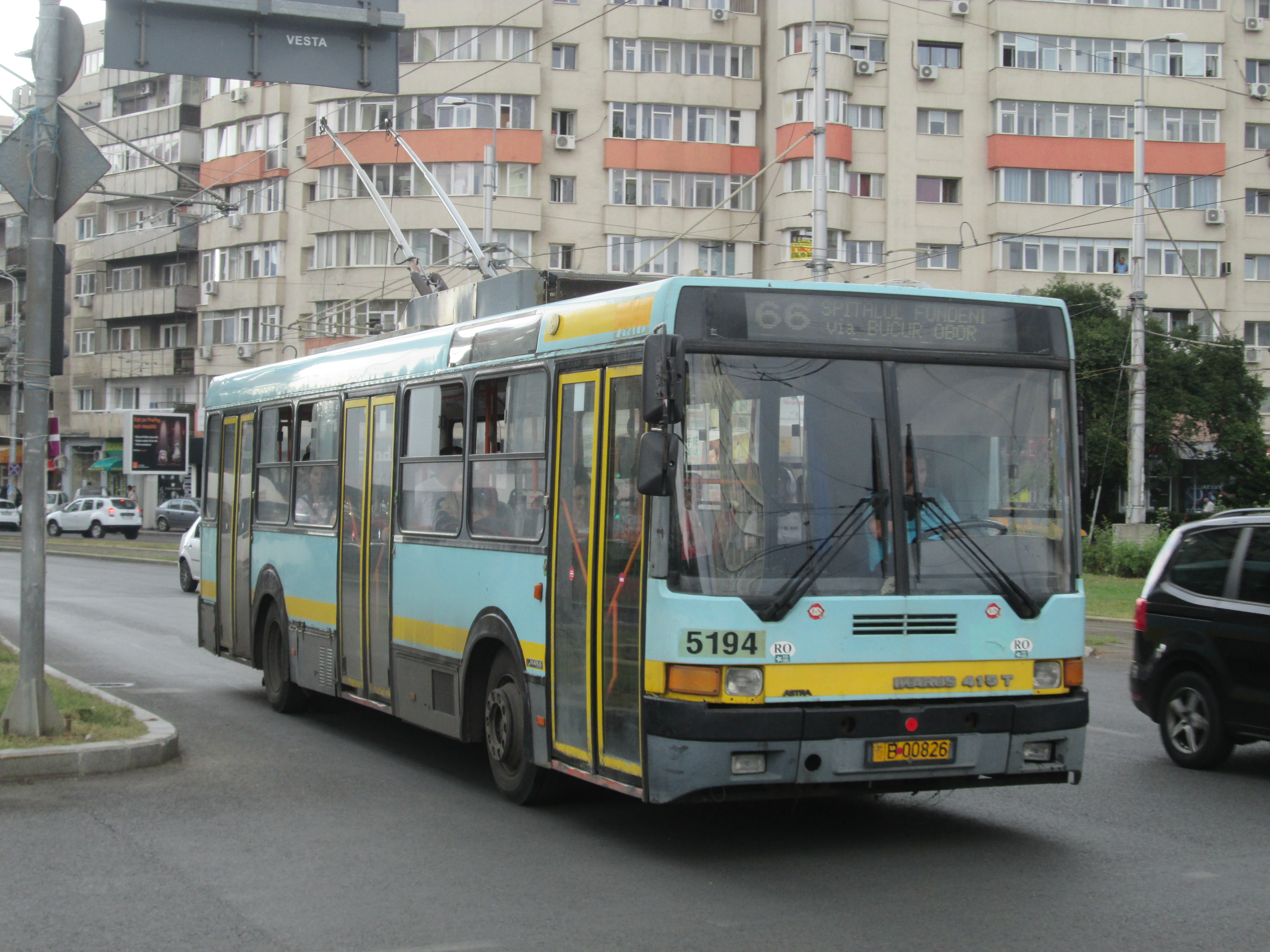

Overview
- Manufacturer: Ikarus Autobuszgyár Székesfehérvár; Astra Bus Arad Ganz Villamossági Művek Budapest; Ansaldo Elettrica Genova; ICPE-SAERP Bucharest; Elektromashinostroytelnyi Zavod Dinamo Moskva
- Production: 1992 (prototype)
- Model years: 1997-2002
- Assembly: Székesfehérvár, Hungary (bodywork); Arad, Romania (final assembly)

Body and chassis
- Class: Complete bus Bus chassis
- Body style: Single-decker trolleybus
- Doors: 2 or 3 doors
- Floor type: Step-entrance

Powertrain
- Engine: UMEB TN96
- Capacity: 106 passengers (26 seated)

Dimensions
- Length: 11,500 mm (37 ft 8 3/4 in)
- Width: 2,500 mm (8 ft 2 3/8 in)
- Height: 3,300 mm (10 ft 9 7/8 in)
- Curb weight: 11.3 t (11.1 long tons; 12.5 short tons) (empty); 18.2 t (17.9 long tons; 20.1 short tons) (full)

Chronology
- Predecessor: Ikarus 260T
- Successor: none (Ikarus went bankrupt in 2003)

The Ikarus 415T (sometimes by astra bus, many called as Astra Ikarus 415T) is a type of trolleybus produced by the Ikarus bus manufacturer (build on Ikarus 415 chassis) in Hungary in 1992 and between 1997 and 2002.

== Subseries ==
These trolleybuses have 3 subseries, as shown below:

=== Ikarus 415T.1 ===
The first trolleybus of this type was made in 1992 as a prototype from the Ikarus 415 bus model launched in 1985, featuring innovative technologies at the time, including microprocessor-control. The prototype was initially tested in Budapest, and it was modified in 1997, and it would later end up in Debrecen and Bratislava for trials. Finally, it ended in Tallinn where it would serve as a basis to buy the Ikarus 412T low-floor models, being retired in 2006 and eventually scrapped. The livery on this vehicle was of a purple body with a yellow trim and dark-gray underside.

=== Astra-Ikarus 415.80T ===
In 1997, the Bucharest public transport operator RATB ordered 200 trolleybuses, seeking to replace some of the ageing DAC-series trolleybuses (from 1980-1995). An agreement with Ikarus was reached, where it would produce the bodies at their plant in Székesfehérvár and the final assembly would be done by the Astra Railway Carriage factory in Arad, using licensed electrical equipments from GVM (Ganz Electrical Works), Ansaldo and UMEB (Uzina de Motoare Electrice București/Bucharest Electrical Motor Works). The first 30 units were completed by 1997 and at the end of 2002, all 200 units were introduced. The livery applied on these vehicles is of a light blue body, with a yellow trim and dark-gray underside, similar to that of the prototype, and on some units, the sides are painted white.

They were delivered in 2 batches, as follows:

- First batch (51xx, round windows)
  - 5100-5129, made in 1997
  - 5130-5199, made in 1998
- Second batch (52xx, square windows)
  - 5201-5205, made in 1999
  - 5206-5211, made in 2000
  - 5215-5245, made in 2001
  - 5246-5299, made in 2002
  - 5212-5214, made in 2002 (initially made in 2000, they were brought by the public transport operator from Galați, and the replacement vehicles only arrived in 2002)
- Third sub-batch (5300), made in 2002.

A few interesting facts about these vehicles is that 5202 has an ICPE-SAERP-made microprocessor (on the rest of the vehicles, these were made by Ansaldo) and 5207 was presented at the Moscow Expocentre in 2000. 5132, 5135, 5175, 5201 and 5249 were converted to driving-school vehicles, and 5135 appeared in Marilena from P7 (2006) by Cristian Nemescu. Trolleybus 5300 is no different than the ones from the second batch, it was classed differently just because of its number (note that trolleybuses numbered 5301-5400 are Irisbus Citelis-es). The lack of a trolleybus numbered 5200 is widely attributed to an urban legend that this number was reserved for the Ikarus 411T low floor prototype of the 415T which underwent testing in Bucharest around 1998-1999, which was returned to Ikarus.

Currently, only 3 examples were scrapped, and were stripped of spare parts, but starting from 2017, another few examples were retired, due to the lack of parts. As of September 2018, it is believed that 10 examples were out of order. Rumors spread that the rest will be sold to Ukraine, Moldova or Russia as second-hand vehicles. Despite this, one example was recently refurbished and painted entirely in green.

The three Galați Ikarus trolleybuses were initially supposed to be delivered to Bucharest with the numbers 5212-5214, but were then bought by Transurb SA to replace the older DAC trolleybuses. They were the only trolleybuses in Galați from 2001 to 2008, until the arrival of MAZ-203T trolleybuses from Belarus. Their initial numbers were 223-225, but were renumbered in 2008 as 1279-1281. As of September 2018, all three are going to be retired, spending most of their time in the depot, being replaced with Skoda 26Tr trolleybuses.

=== Ikarus-Dinamo 415.83T ===
This variant was a prototype that was supposed to be designed for the local Russian market, in 2001. For adaptation to the Russian market, it was fitted with electrical equipment similar to the ones on the ZiU-9, being made at the Dinamo Electrical Constructions Factory from Moscow, and the bodywork was identical to the 5200-series vehicles from Bucharest. The livery was also identical to the Bucharest examples, but it used a darker blue. The trolleybus was shown at the Expocentre in Moscow in 2001, in a similar fashion of how Ikarus presented 5207 from RATB, 2 years prior. Whilst Dinamo was hoping that the Russian transport companies would buy a modern trolleybus that had equipment similar to the familiar ZiU-9s, and that Ikarus was hoping that such orders would save the company from impending bankruptcy, in the end, no orders materialised. The reason for the lack of orders were the sudden increases in the production costs, causing the vehicle to cost twice as much as a ZiU-9 (its design dated from 1972, and its production only stopped around 2016). The prototype was in the end abandoned at the Csepel Szigethalom yard, and in 2004 it was converted into a diesel bus, still in operation by Alba Volan ZRt.

== Gallery ==
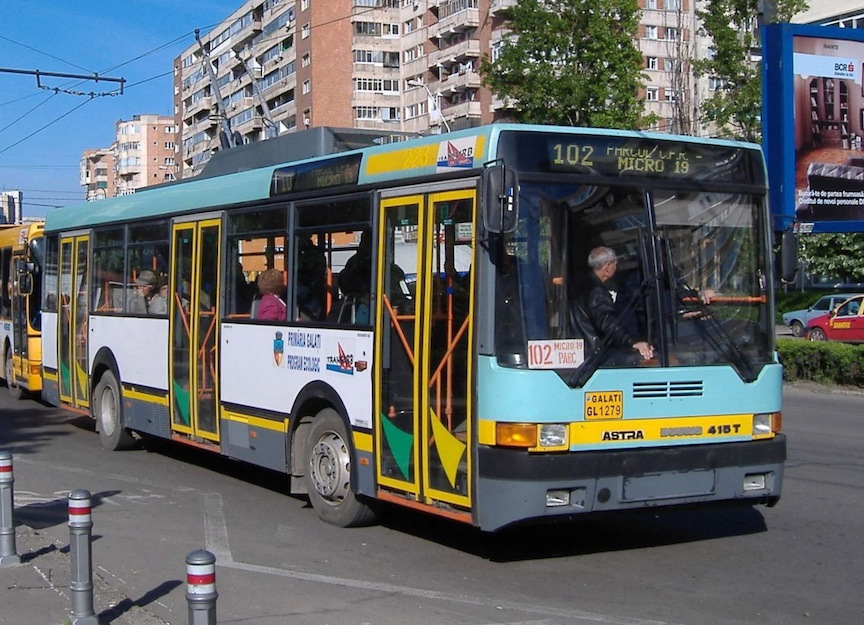
Transurb 1279 in Galați, 2008

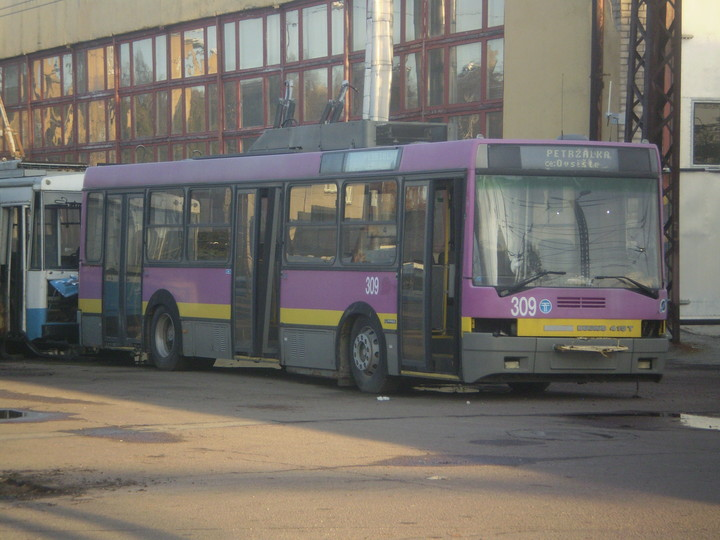
TAK 309 in Tallinn, after retirement, 2008. This was the prototype from 1992.

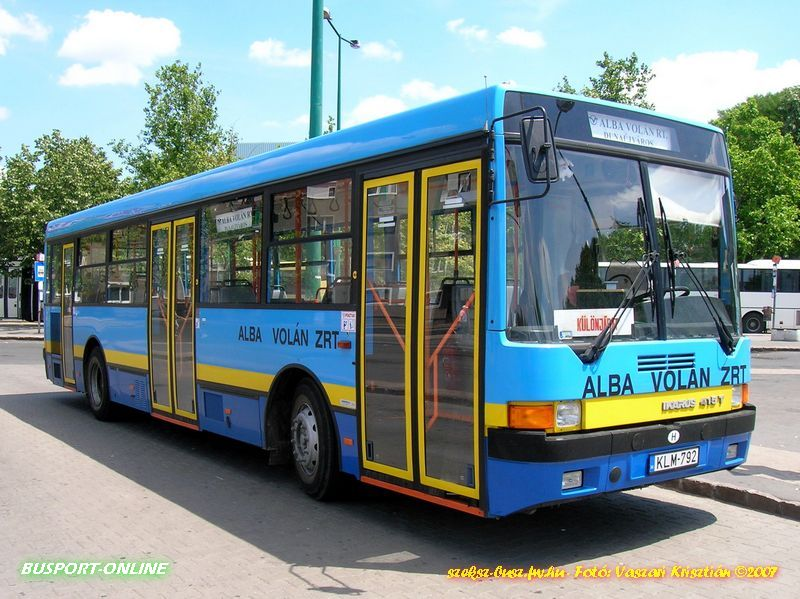
Alba Volan ZRt. KLM-792, the Ikarus 415T.93 diesel bus converted from the Ikarus-Dinamo prototype, 2007.
