= Astra Arad =

Romanian road and rail vehicle manufacturer

- Company type: Public
- Industry: Engineering
- Founded: 1891; 135 years ago
- Defunct: 1998; 28 years ago
- Fate: Divided into different branches
- Successor: Astra Bus (1996); Astra Rail Industries (1998); Astra Vagoane Călători (1998)
- Headquarters: Arad, Romania
- Area served: Worldwide
- Products: Passenger railroad cars Railmotors; Rapid transit cars Trams; Buses; Taxis

ASTRA Arad, also known as Întreprinderea de Vagoane Arad (IVA), is the name of a group of industrial engineering and rolling stock companies originated in Arad, Romania. Operating as a single entity until 1996, the company then split into other independent companies, Astra Vagoane for freight cars production (integrated later in Astra Rail Industries), Astra Vagoane Călători for passenger coaches and trams, and Astra Bus for bus and trolleybus manufacturing.

== History ==
=== Early history ===
==== Johann Weitzer'sche Maschinen-Waggonfabrik ====
Johann Weitzer (born in 1832, died in 1902) was an Austrian skilled blacksmith and businessman. In 1854, he founded his own workshop, which expanded quickly, even producing vehicles for the construction of the Suez Canal. The main products were railway wagons and arms for Austrian use. In 1872, he transformed his enterprise into a joint-stock company, which later merged with two other companies to Simmering-Graz-Pauker.

In 1891, Johann Weitzer founded, as a subsidiary of the Austrian company in the Hungarian part of Austria-Hungary, the John Weitzer Engine- & Waggon-building & Iron Casting Joint-stock Company (German: Johann Weitzer'sche Maschinen-Waggonfabrik und Eisengiesserei Actien-Gesellschaft; Hungarian: Weitzer János Gép-, Waggongyár és Vasöntöde Rt.). It produced locomotives, railway waggons, tramcars (such as 17 items for Temesvár (today Timișoara)), and, since 1903, Weitzer railmotor, Europe's first successful series of railcars.

==== MARTA ====
The automobiles manufactured in Arad was a licensed production of Westinghouse 150 cars from 1909 to 1912. In 1912 the plant was taken over by Austro-Daimler and renamed to MARTA, the acronym for Hungarian Automobile Joint-stock Company Arad (Hungarian: Magyar Automobil Részvény Társaság Arad). After the edition auf 500 automobiles, civil production ceased in 1914, due to World War I.

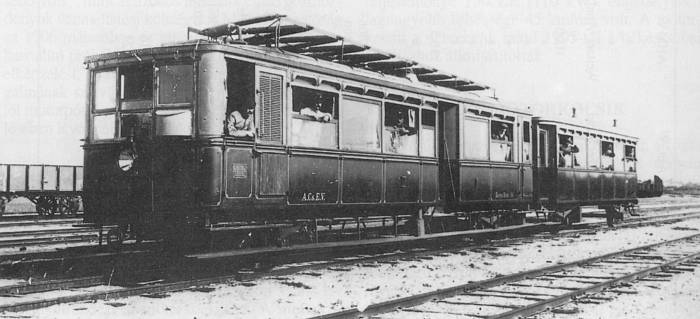
Weitzer Railmotor at the ACsEV

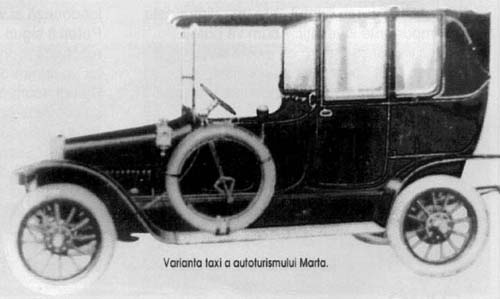
MARTA taxi

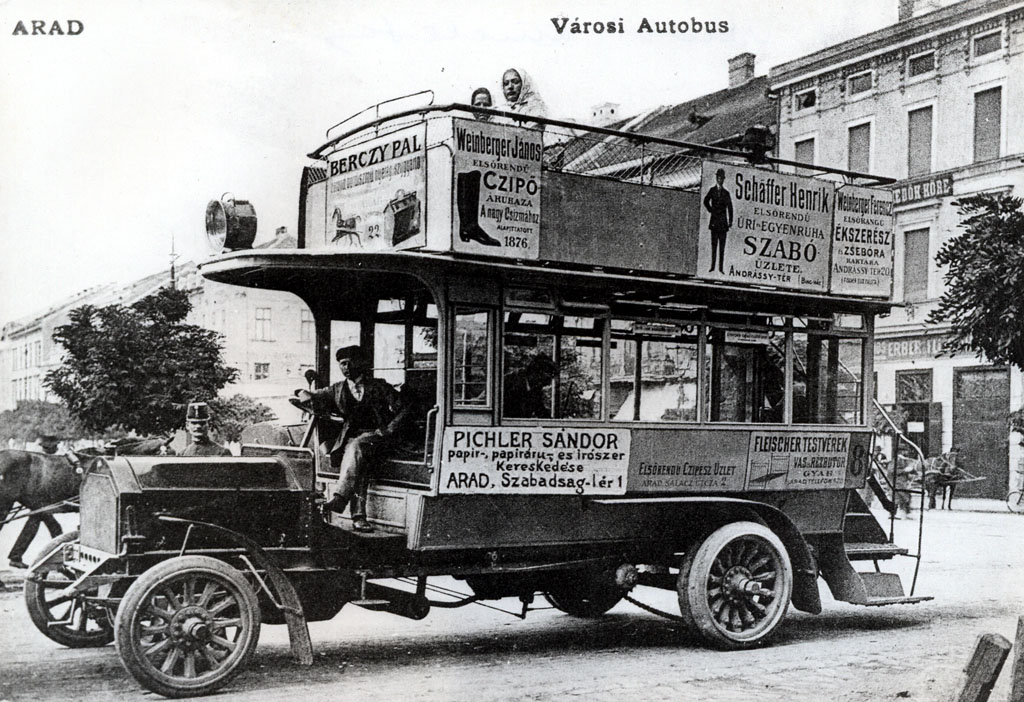
Marta bus in Arad in 1909

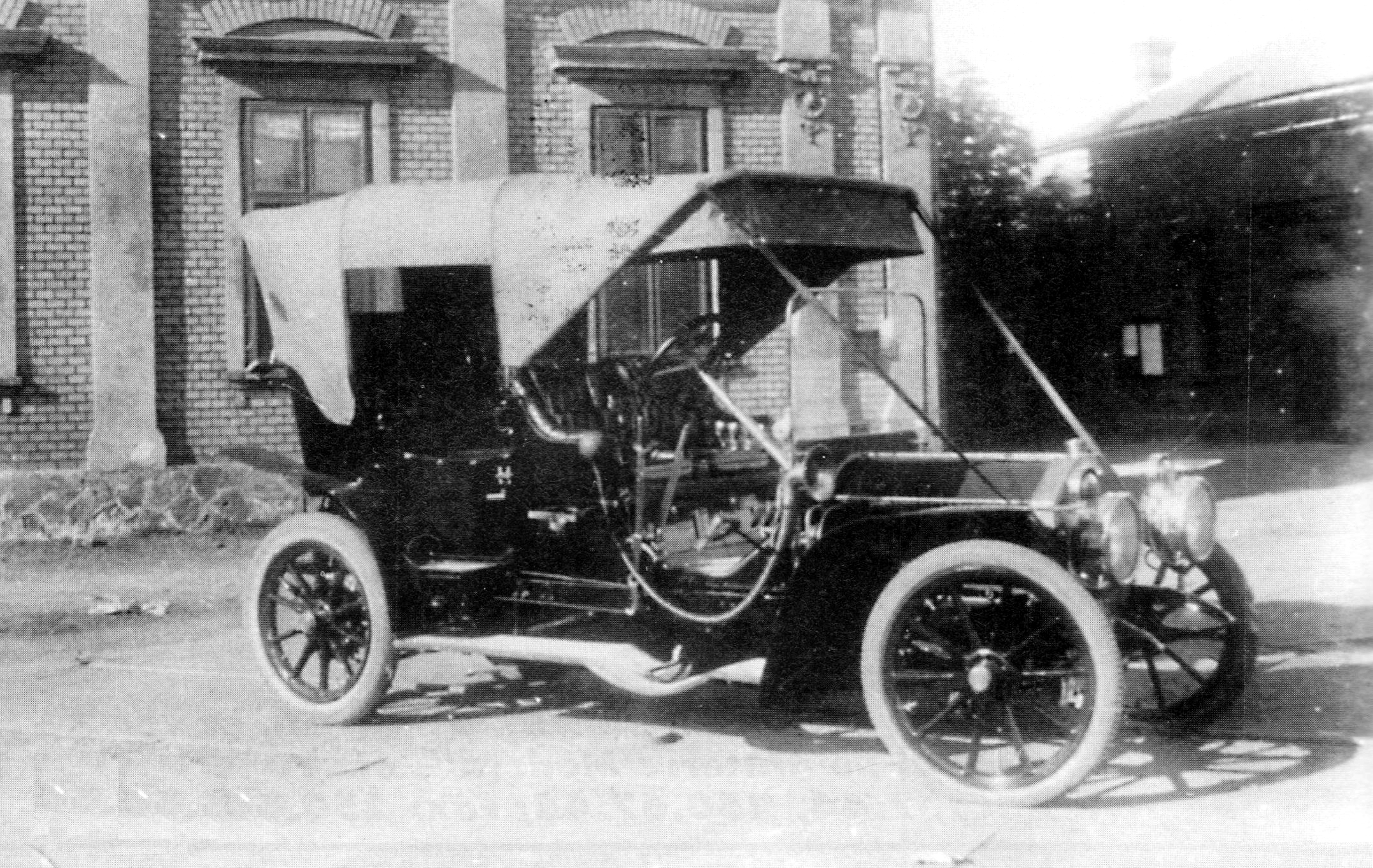
Marta car

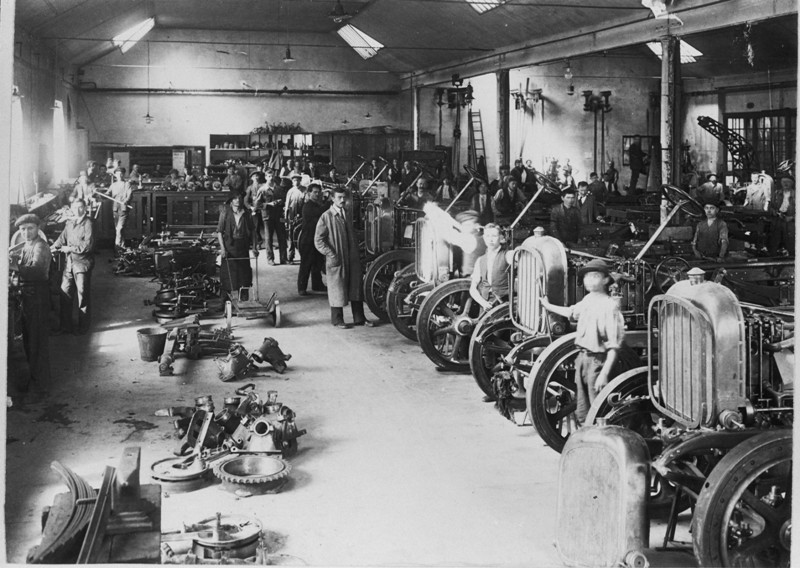
Marta Trucks under construction in the factory

=== ASTRA Arad ===
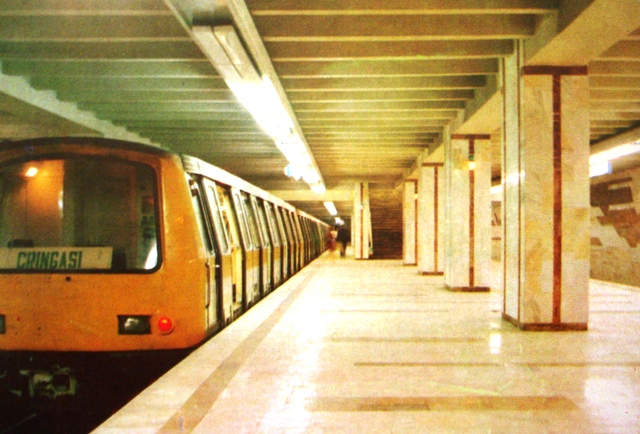
A Bucharest Metro train Astra IVA in the 1980s

In 1921, after the dissolution of the Austria-Hungary and the Treaty of Trianon, the two companies, located in Romania, merged to form ASTRA Automobile & Waggon Factory (Romanian: Fabrica de automobile și vagoane Astra). This company from 1922 to 1926 also manufactured some automobiles and lorries, but the main production were rail vehicles.

=== Întreprinderea de Vagoane Arad (IVA) ===
After World War II, the company was nationalized and became Europe's biggest manufacturer of freight cars, as Întreprinderea de Vagoane Arad (IVA). The factory also produced passenger coaches and ensured the entire fleet of coaches for Bucharest Metro. It produced railcars for internal market and exported to all five continents.

In 1990, the company was renamed as ASTRA Vagoane Arad. With privatization, in 1998-2000, it was split into specialists for the various branches. The production of freight cars, Astra Vagoane Arad, was sold to Trinity Industries, which sold it to International Railway Systems (IRS), seated in Luxemburg, but mainly based on plants in eastern Europe. In November 2010, Astra Vagoane Arad and the two other Romanian subsidiaries of IRS went bankrupt, and reformed under the name Astra Rail Industries (ARI) in 2012. In 2016, The Greenbrier Companies and ARI agreed to form a joint venture, 75% owned by Greenbrier. The new business is to be named Greenbrier-Astra Rail.

The other descenders of ASTRA Arad are Astra Vagoane Călători (Astra Passenger Cars) and Astra Bus.

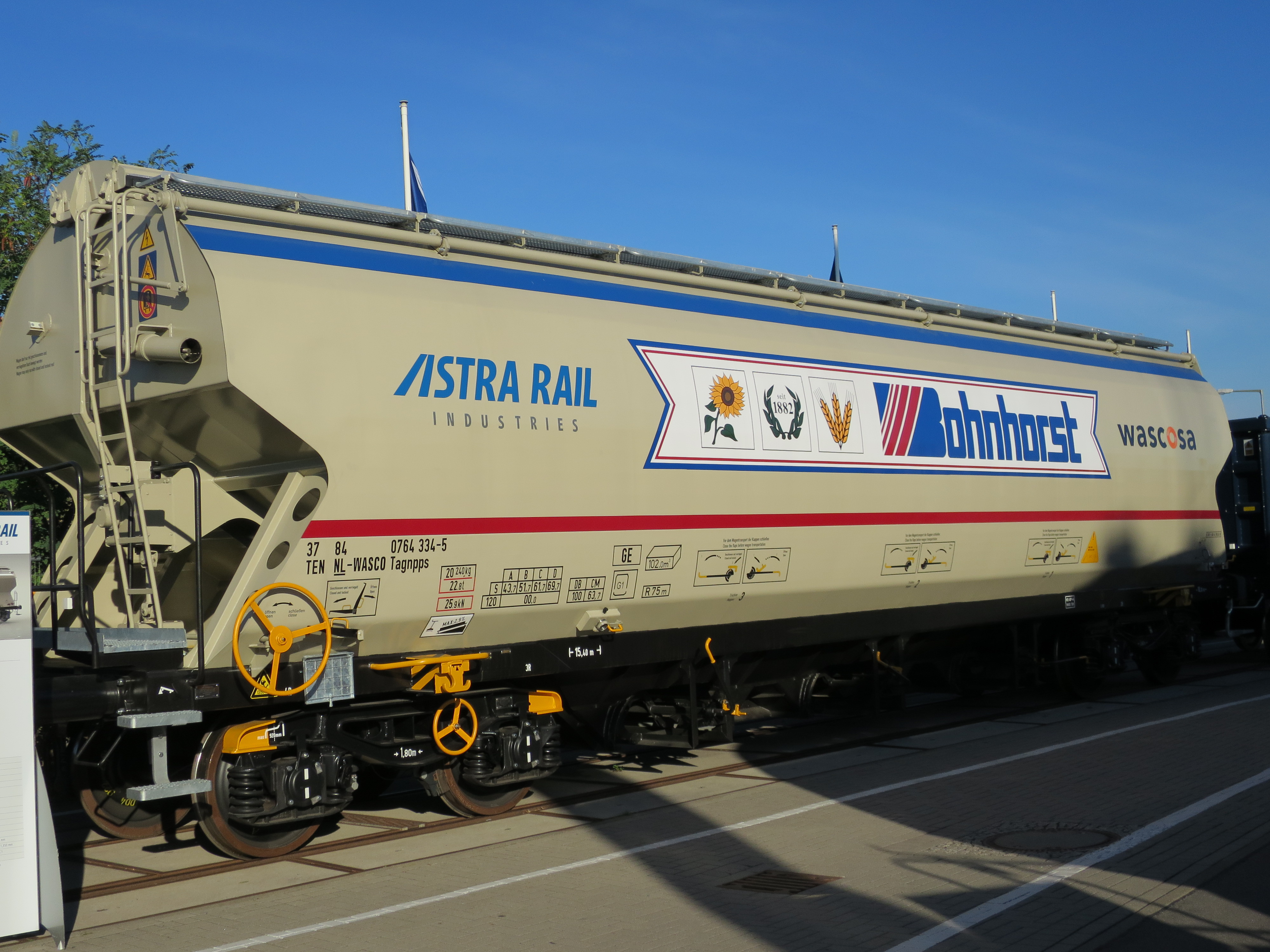
Grain hopper car made by Astra Rail Industries

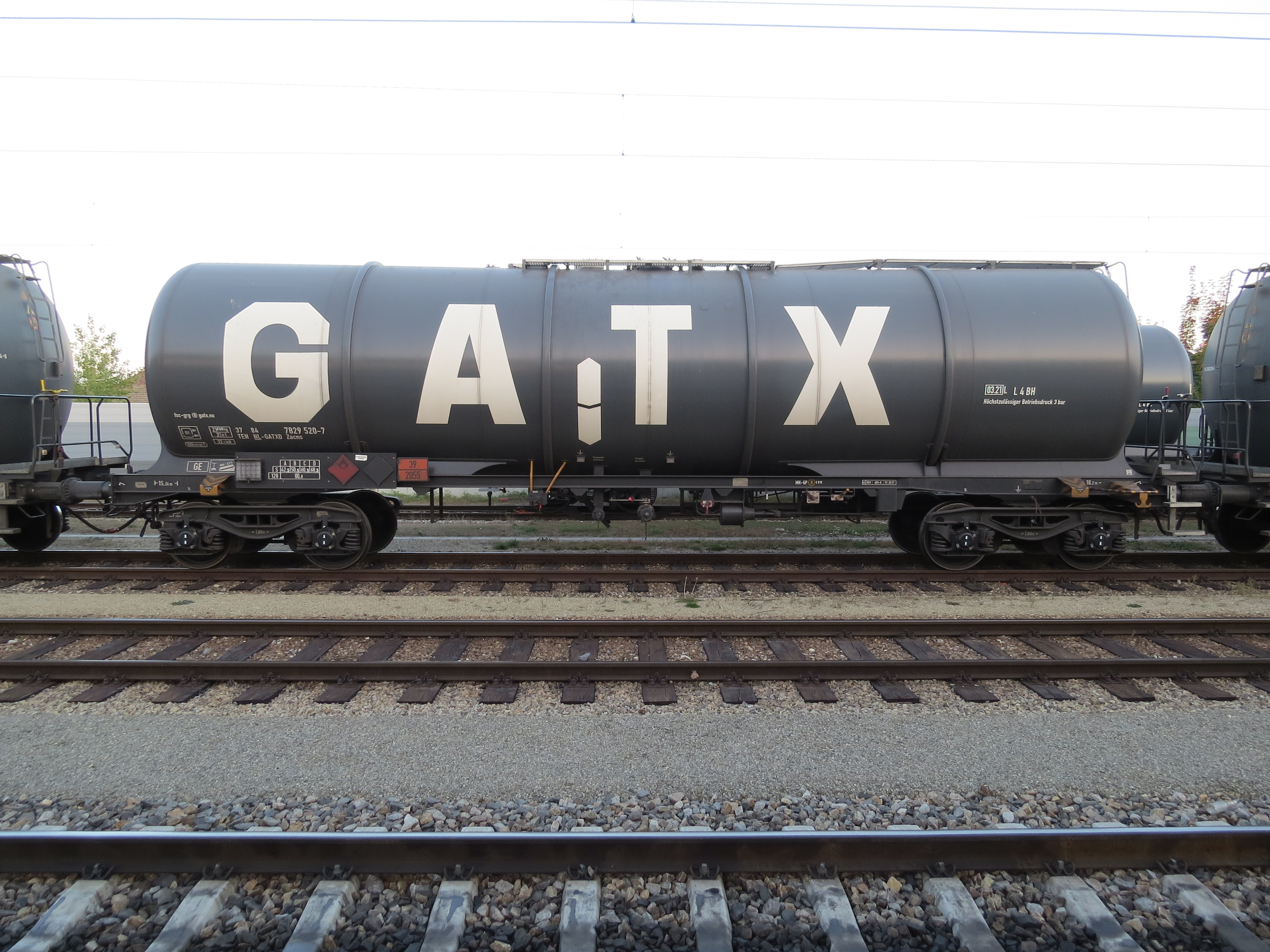
GATX tank car (Astra Rail Industries)

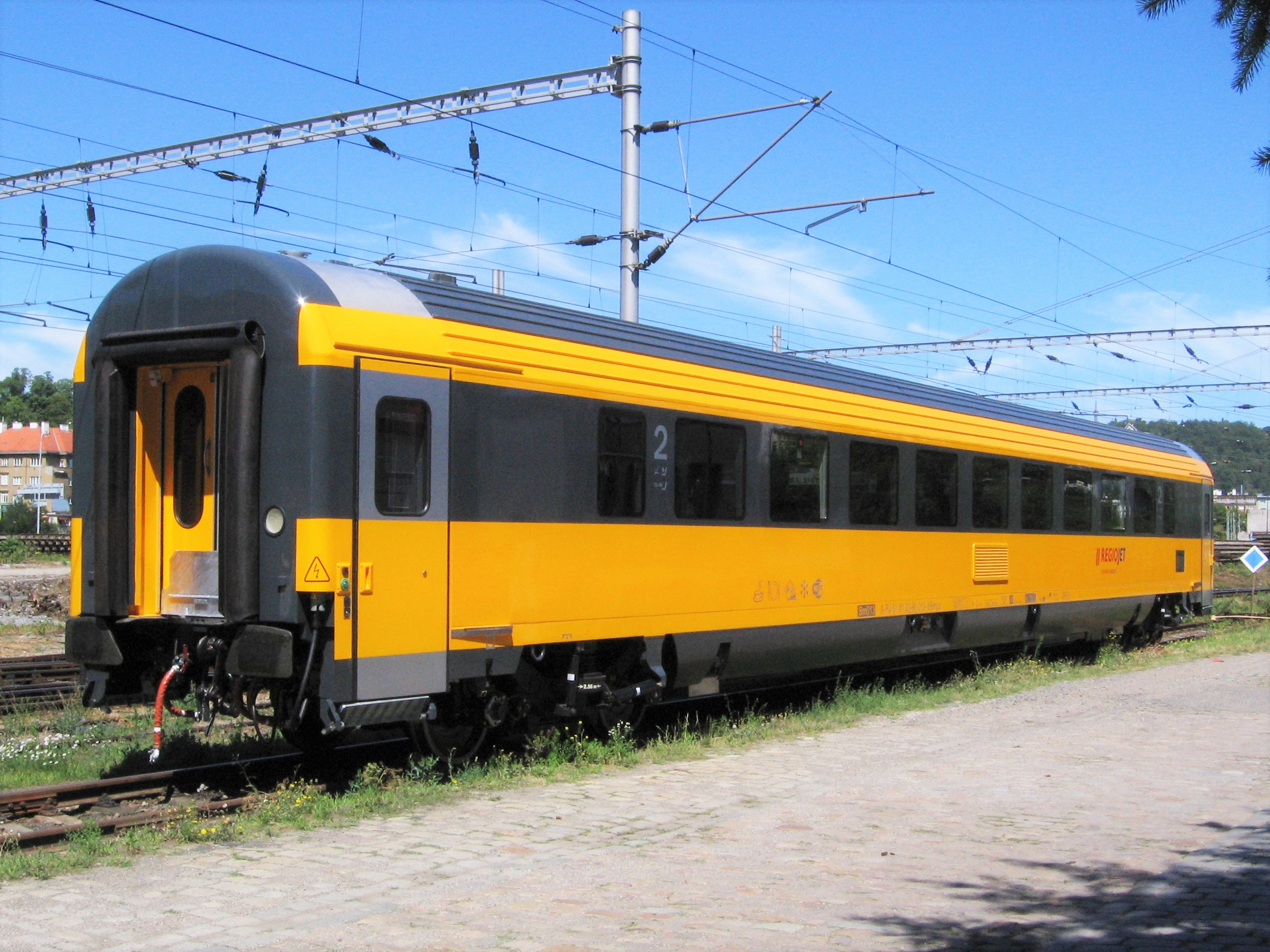
Astra Vagoane Călători passenger car produced for RegioJet

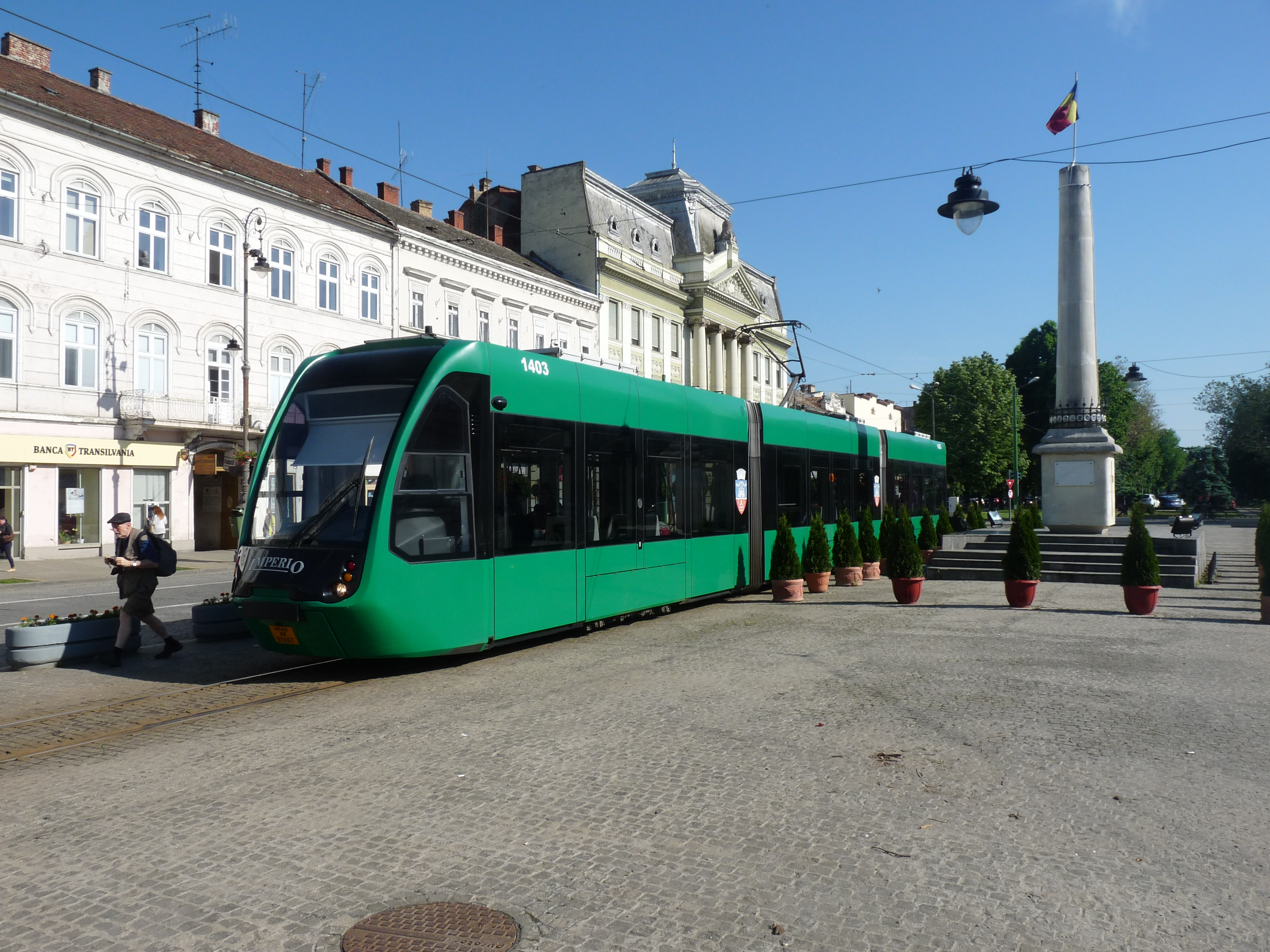
Astra Imperio tram produced for CTP Arad (Astra Vagoane Călători in partnership with Siemens Mobility)

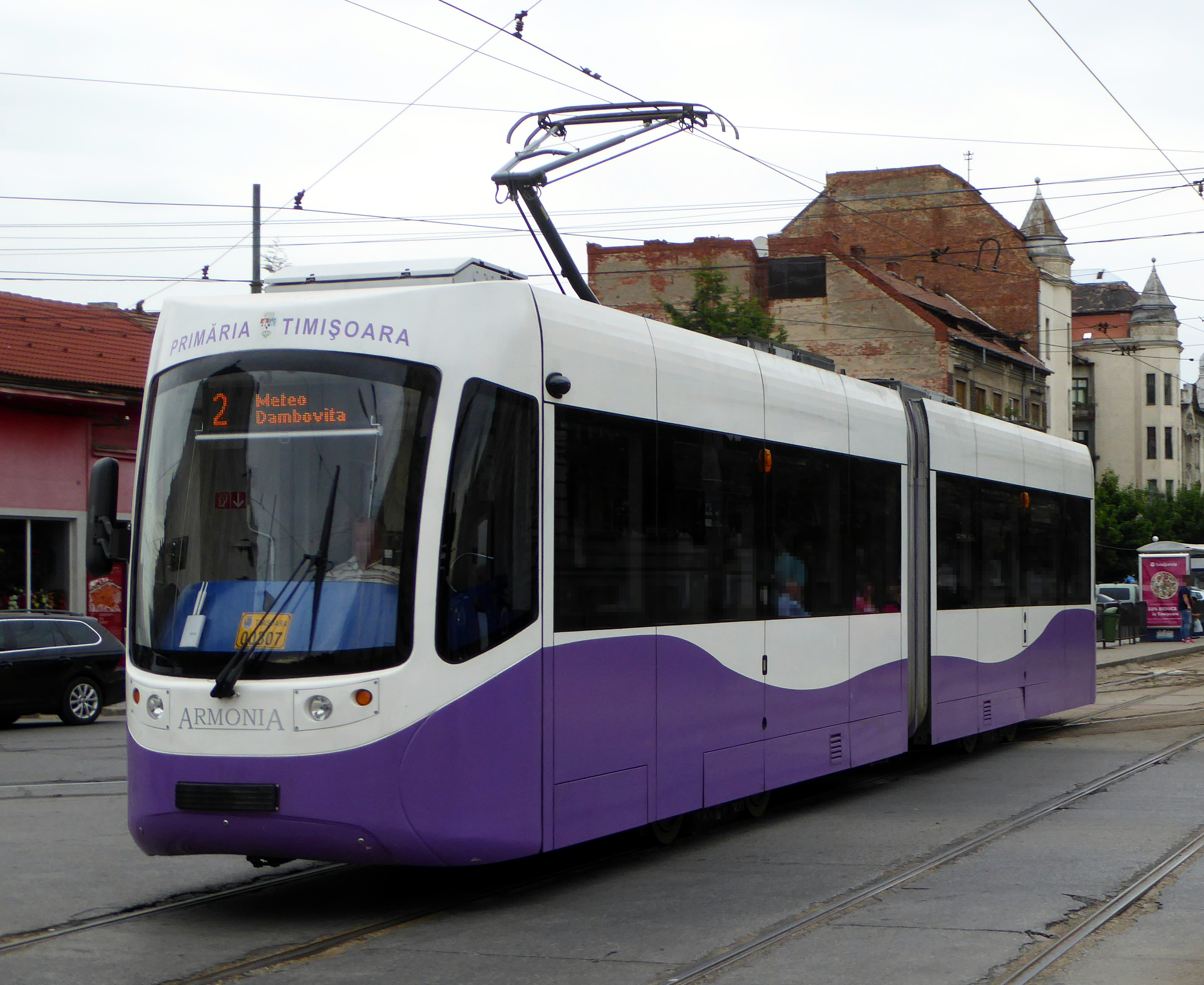
Rebuilt GT4 Armonia tram for STP Timișoara (Astra Vagoane Călători in partnership with Electroputere VFU)

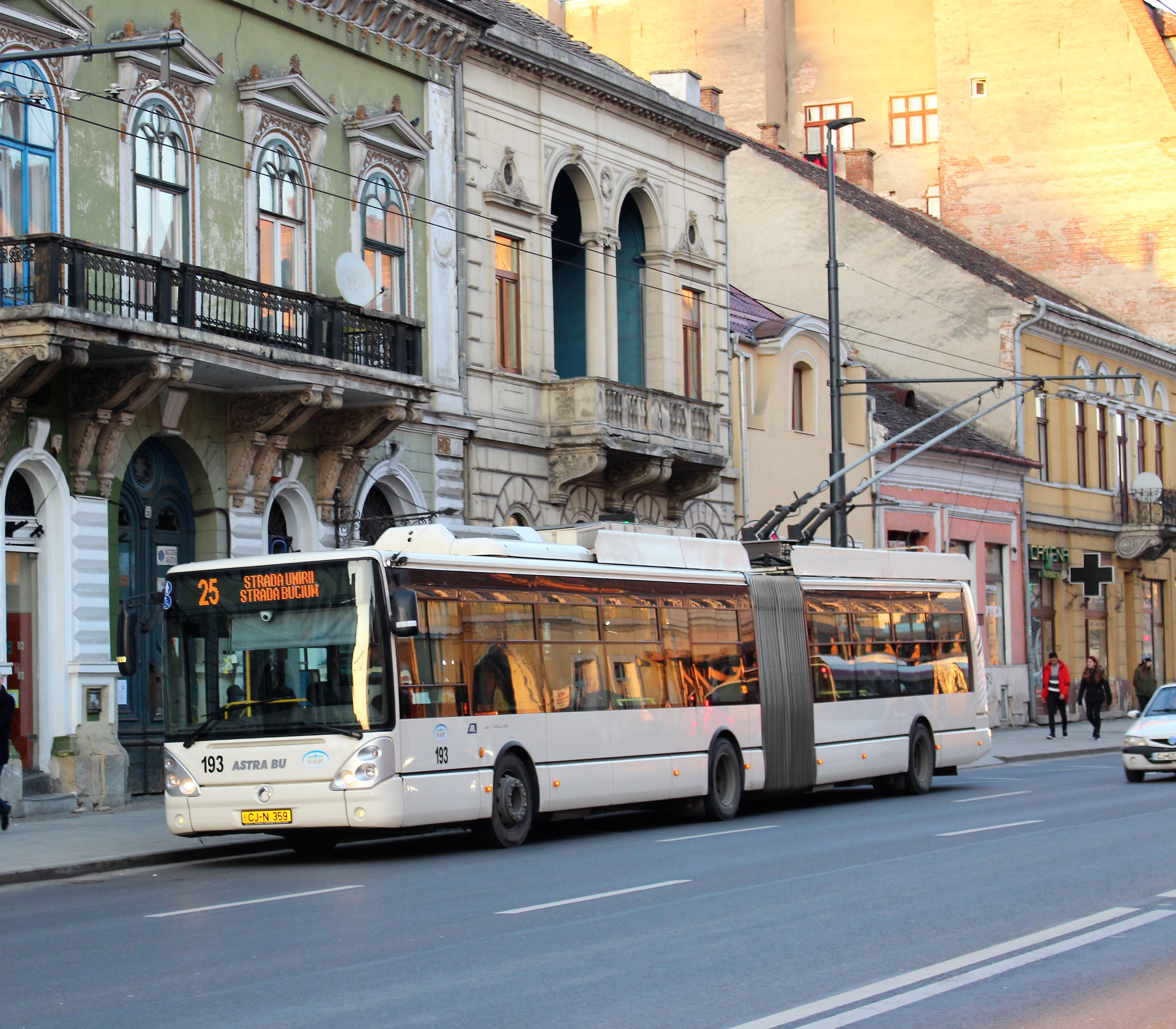
Astra Citelis 18 trolleybus for CTP Cluj-Napoca (Astra Bus in partnership with Iveco Bus)
