= Astra Bus =

Romanian bus manufacturer

Astra Bus S.R.L.
- Company type: Private
- Industry: Automotive
- Founded: 1996
- Headquarters: Arad, Romania
- Key people: Cristian Gavra (Chairman)
- Products: Buses, trolleybuses, minibuses
- Website: astrabus.ro

Astra Bus is a bus manufacturer based in Arad, Romania. The company was established in 1996, splitting from Astra Vagoane Arad, a company specialized in manufacturing railroad cars. Since 2003, it is part of the Cefin Holding Group and their products have been buses and trolleybuses from the Irisbus range, under a partnership with the Italian company, and, on a small scale, minibuses based on Iveco, Mercedes-Benz or Volkswagen chassis.

== Bus products ==
- Astra Ikarus 415T
- Irisbus Agora
- Irisbus Citelis
- Astra Citelis PS01T1

== Other products ==
- Volkswagen Crafter
- Mercedes-Benz Sprinter
- Iveco New Daily
- Volkswagen LT
- Ford Transit
- Mercedes-Benz TN
- Mercedes-Benz Vario
- Mercedes Benz Vito W638
- Renault Master
- Renault Mascott
- Volkswagen Transporter T3
- Fiat Ducato
- Renault Messenger
- Mercedes-Benz Vito 112 CDI
- RAM Promaster
- Freightliner Sprinter
- Dodge Sprinter
- Tempo Traveller
- Gaz Gazelle
- LDV Maxus
- Peugeot Boxer
- Citroen Jumper
- Opel Movano
- Toyota Hiace
- Toyota Coaster
- Hyundai County
