= Astra Rail Industries =

Rolling stock manufacturer

- Predecessor: International Railway Systems, IRS (2002-2011)
- Founded: 2012; 14 years ago
- Headquarters: Arad, Romania
- Products: Rail wagons
- Parent: Greenbrier Europe
- Website: www.astrarail.com

Astra Rail Industries is a Romanian rail vehicle manufacturing company. It was formed in 2002 as the International Railway Systems, part of the Trinity Industries European assets, adding further manufacturing plants in Romania, and a part forging plant in the Czech Republic. In 2012, IRS's three main Romanian manufacturing facilities were reformed under the name Astra Rail Industries, and other activities were sold to third parties. In 2016, The Greenbrier Companies and Astra Rail agreed to form a joint venture, 75% owned by Greenbrier, incorporating both the company's European operations as Greenbrier Europe.

== History ==
International Railway Systems (2002-2011)

International Railway Systems was founded in 2002. The company acquired MEVA SA in Drobeta Turnu Severin, Romania from Trinity Industries in 2002. In 2004 ROMVAG in Caracal was acquired.

In 2006 IRS bought the European assets of Trinity Industries (USA) for $30 million. The acquired businesses were Astra Vagoane Arad (Romania), MSV Metals Studénka (Czech Republic), (Note: MSV Metals Studénka, before acquisition a European subsidiary of Thrall Car Manufacturing Company (USA). A former Škoda Vagonka factory, see also Škoda Vagonka (czech).) and works in Zug, Switzerland and Poprad, Slovakia.

The resultant company in 2007 had three main business divisions: the rail manufacturing division consisted of Astra Vagoane Arad, Meva SA, and Romvag Caracal plus metal forgings manufacturer MSV Metal Studenka; rail wagon fleet company Servtrans; and the marine division through the holdings in Severnay shipyard.

In 2008 IRS together with an investor associate acquired a controlling share holding in three former subsidiaries of Mašinska Industrija Niš (Nis, Serbia), the manufacturing companies: MIN Vagonka (wagons), MIN Lokomotiva (locomotives), and Specijalna Vozila (lifting equipment, specialised vehicles). IRS acquired a 49% share of parent holding company Friulexport d.o.o.. In 2009 the contract of sale was annulled, and the privatisation of the companies reversed.

In 2009 the company's exports amounted to 1.1% of Romania's total exports, and was the largest European manufacturer of rail wagons with a 20% market share. IRS's rail wagon orders were deeply affected by the Great Recession following the 2008 financial crisis resulting in the main wagon building business becoming insolvent in 2010.

Bankruptcy (2010-2011)

Following a severe downturn in rail wagon orders due to economic depression, Astra Vagoane Arad, Meva and Romvag Caracal became insolvent in 2010, and they were re-organised in 2012 as 'Astra Rail Industries'.

MSV Metals Studénka also entered insolvency in 2011, it was acquired by JET investment in 2013.

Subsidiary rail freight operator Servtrans entered insolvency in 2011, and was acquired by rail operating group 'Grampet Services' in late 2011.

The 29% stake in Severnav shipyard was put up for sale by the liquidations in 2014.

Astra Rail Industries (2012-)

The three rail vehicle manufacturing sites in Romania were reformed under Astra Rail Industries in 2012. The companies were acquired for €30 million which was returned to creditors. The new company's parent was Astra Rail Management BV (95%, Netherlands).

APROMAT ARAD and ICPV Arad were acquired in 2013.

In October 2016 the holding company Astra Rail Management and the Greenbrier Companies (USA) announced they intended to merge their European activities into a joint venture named Greenbrier-Astra Rail. As part of the agreement Greenbrier was to pay $60million total to Astra Rail, with the joint venture becoming 75% owned by Greenbrier.

In June 2017, the joint venture began operating.

== See also ==
- Astra Vagoane Arad
