= Škoda 24Tr Irisbus =

Low-entry trolleybus produced by Irisbus and Škoda Transportation

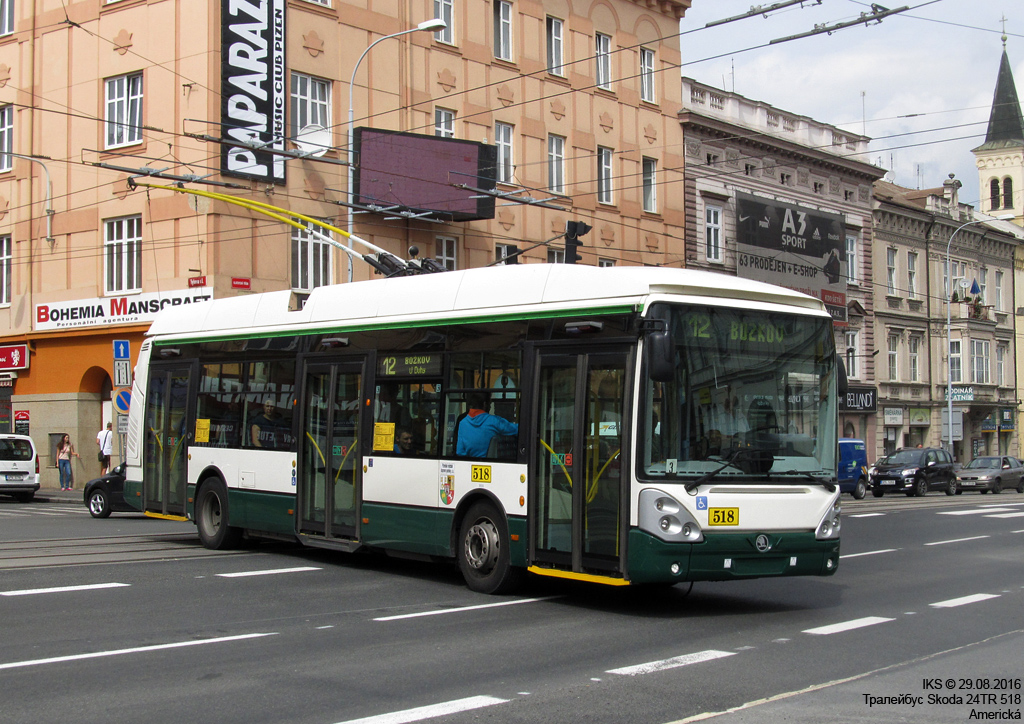
- Škoda 24Tr Irisbus in Plzeň, Czech Republic

Overview
- Manufacturer: Irisbus; Škoda Transportation
- Model years: 2003-2014
- Assembly: Annonay, France; Plzeň, Czech Republic

Body and chassis
- Doors: 3
- Floor type: Low entry
- Chassis: semi-self-supporting with frame
- Related: Irisbus Agora; Irisbus Citelis

Powertrain
- Capacity: 30 sitting 69 standing
- Power output: 210 kW (282 hp) + 100 kW (134 hp) (optional diesel generator APU Kirsch 100 DIPME)

Dimensions
- Length: 11,990 mm (39 ft 4 in)
- Width: 2,500 mm (8 ft 2 3/8 in)
- Height: 3,500 mm (11 ft 5 3/4 in)
- Curb weight: 11,500 kg (25,400 lb) (without the diesel-generator); 11,500 kg (25,400 lb) (with the diesel-generator)

Chronology
- Predecessor: Škoda 14Tr, Škoda 21Tr

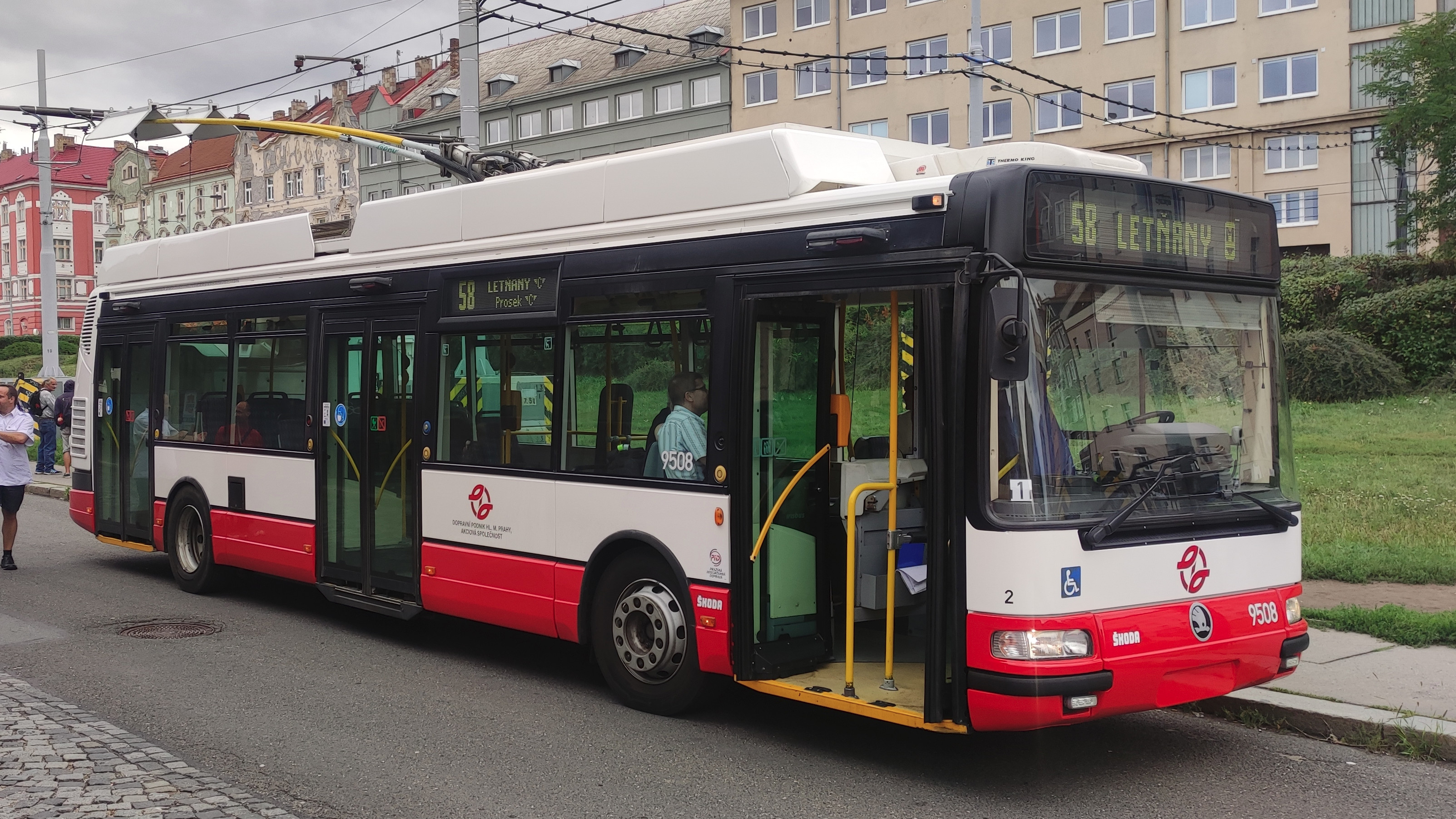
Škoda 24Tr Irisbus (first generation) in Prague

Škoda 24Tr Irisbus (known as Irisbus Skoda 24Tr in Western Europe) is a low-entry trolleybus model built from 2003 until 2014 by Czech trolleybus manufacturer Škoda Electric (subsidiary of Škoda Transportation), supplying electrical equipment, in cooperation with Irisbus, supplying body.

== Development ==
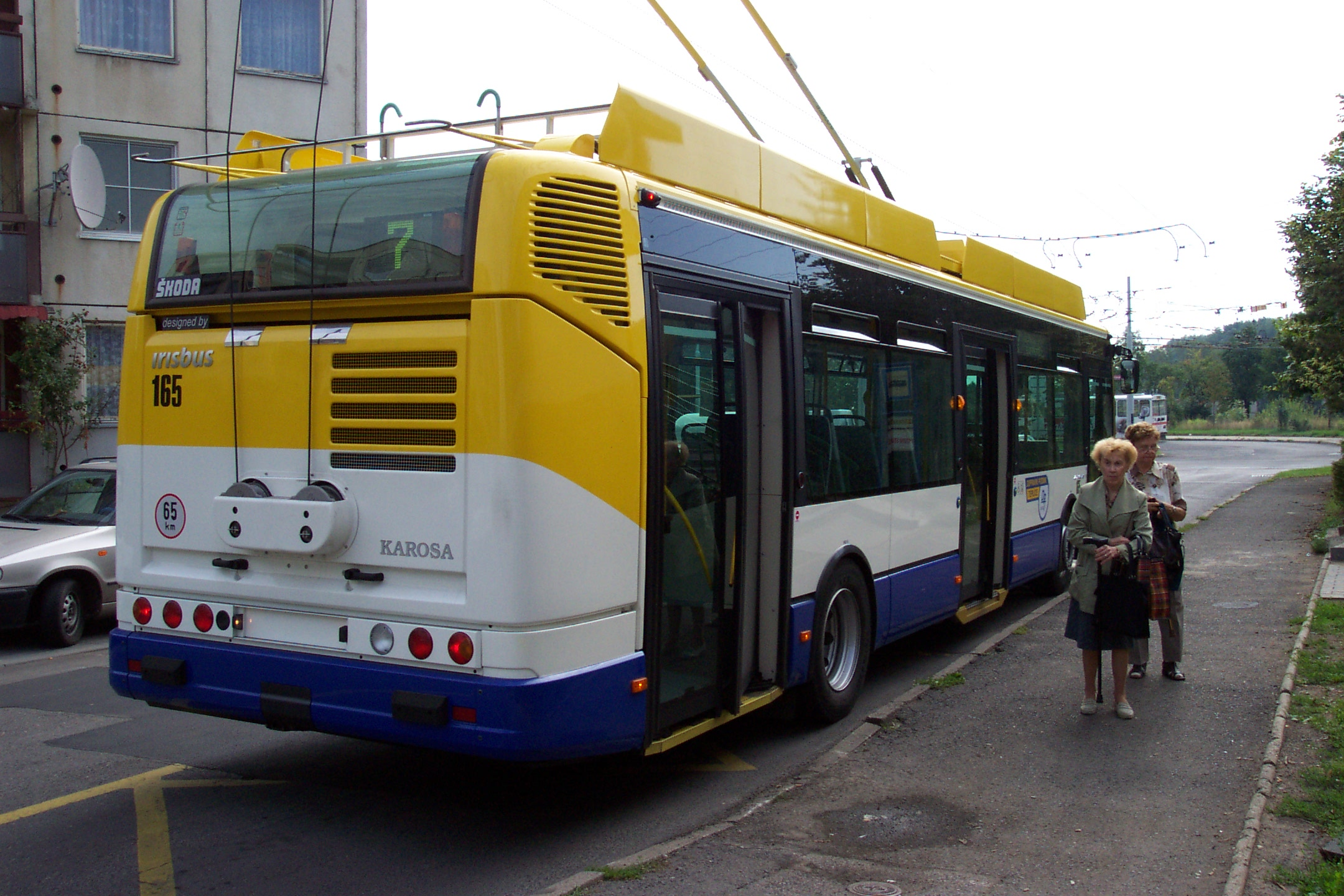
Škoda 24Tr Irisbus rear in Teplice, Czech Republic in August 2006

After a relatively successful effort to unify bus and trolleybus (Karosa ŠM 11/Škoda T-11, Karosa B 831/Škoda 17Tr and Skoda 21ab/Škoda 21Tr), Czechs took fourth attempt, and created a trolleybus Škoda 24Tr. Trolleybus Skoda 24Tr is based on the Irisbus Agora bus and upgraded version Irisbus Citelis.

The Škoda 24Tr trolleybus is a two-axle trolleybus with self-supporting body. Trolleybus is a low floor, only the back of the seats on the stand. Thanks to air cushion properties (the ability to lower the air pressure trolley on the right) moves to the trolley stop is able to fall to the pavement level. On the right side, there are three double doors with a "stop" button, which opens at the passenger's request.

Electrical equipment, based on IGBT transistor base, are placed in special containers on the roof. Some trolleybuses have built-in auxiliary diesel generators. This allows the trolleys to divert from routes in case it is not possible to power the trolley using contact poles, or if it is necessary to detour on streets without overhead wire coverage. Diesel generators are also used to extend the operating range where there is not overhead wire coverage when running on regular routes, such as the Riga 9th and 27th trolleybus routes.

The first trolleybus was built on the Citybus bus-based (based on the roof of CNG-based). Due to this type of bus abandonment and replacement by more modern buses Citelis, the trolley body was based on Citelis base (such trolleybuses began producing 2005), but the name remained unchanged at Citelis.

== Production ==
Trolleybuses produced between 2003 and 2014.

Country	City	Carbody	Year	Amount	Reference
Czech Republic	Jihlava	Citybus	2005	1	
Czech Republic	Jihlava	Citelis 1A	2006–2007	5	
Czech Republic	Mariánské Lázně	Citybus	2004–2005	2	
Czech Republic	Mariánské Lázně	Citelis 1A	2006	5	
Czech Republic	Pardubice	Citelis 1A	2006–2007	6	
Czech Republic	Plzeň	Citybus	2004–2005	4	
Czech Republic	Plzeň	Citelis 1A	2006–2007	7	
Czech Republic	Plzeň	Citelis 1B	2006–2009	9	
Czech Republic	Teplice	Citelis 1A	2006–2007	4	
Czech Republic	Teplice	Citelis 1B	2008	3	
Czech Republic	Zlín – Otrokovice	Citybus	2004–2005	12	
Czech Republic	Zlín – Otrokovice	Citelis 1A	2006	2	
Czech Republic	Zlín – Otrokovice	Citelis 1B	2013–2014	6	
Czech Republic	Prague	Citybus	2005	1	
Latvia	Riga	Citelis 1B	2007–2009	150	
Romania	Timișoara	Citelis 1B	2008	50	
Slovakia	Prešov	Citelis 1A	2006–2007	5	
Slovakia	Prešov	Citelis 1B	2008	2	
Uzbekistan	Urgench	Citelis 1B	2013	9	
Bulgaria	Haskovo	Citybus	2005	2	

== See also ==
- List of buses
