= Irisbus Agora =

Low-floor bus designed and built by Renault

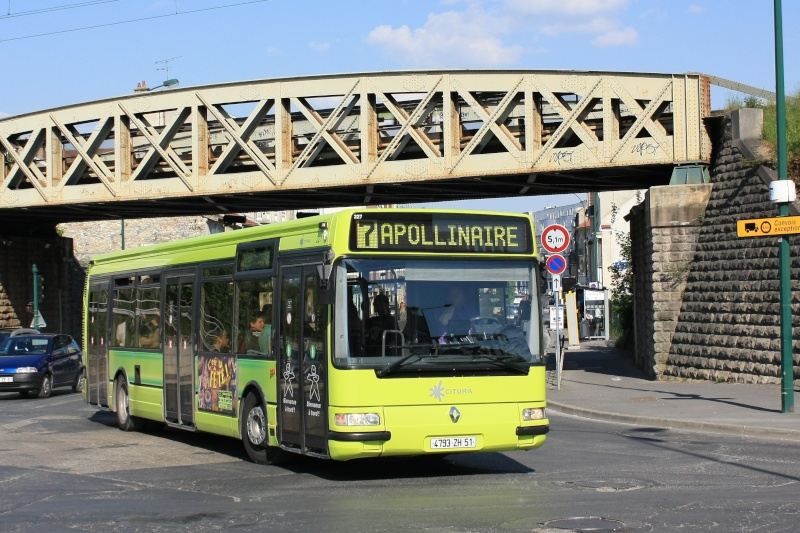
- Renault Agora Standard (S) in Reims in April 2011

Overview
- Manufacturer: Renault; Irisbus; Karosa; Astra Bus
- Production: 1996-2006

Body and chassis
- Doors: 1 door (United Kingdom and Australia); 1, 2, 3 or 4 doors (Europe)
- Floor type: Low-floor

Powertrain
- Engine: Renault MIDR 062045; IVECO Cursor F2B
- Capacity: 34 to 75 seated
- Power output: 186 kW (249 hp) (Renault); 189 kW (253 hp); 213 kW (286 hp) (IVECO)
- Transmission: Voith DIWA 3 or 4-speed automatic ZF Ecomat 4 or 5-speed automatic

Dimensions
- Length: 11.99 m (39.3 ft) (Agora S)
- Width: 2.5 m (8.2 ft)
- Height: 2.924 m (9.6 ft)
- Curb weight: 11,380 kg (25,090 lb)

Chronology
- Predecessor: Renault R312
- Successor: Irisbus Citelis

The Irisbus Agora (previously known as Renault Agora, Karosa Citybus, Renault Citybus, Irisbus Citybus or Ikarus Agora) was a low-floor bus designed and built by Renault from 1995 to 2002, the date upon which it has been built by Irisbus, firstly a joint-venture with Fiat subsidiary Iveco from 1999, with Iveco engines. It has also been built by Czech-based Karosa under the Citybus name as a diesel-powered bus, Skoda as a trolleybus in Eastern European markets as the Škoda 24Tr Irisbus and Škoda 25Tr Irisbus, and by the Romanian-based Astra Bus.

== Range ==
The range consisted of:

- Standard 12-metre "S" version, available in one-, two- or three-door form
- Articulated 18-metre "L" version in three- or four-door form
- "Line" 12-metre version in one, two or three-door form (built from 1999). This version is distinct from the standard Agora by its engine layout, which is longitudinally-mounted (under the rear passenger seats) instead of being transversely mounted in the Agora S and L. That gives the Line version a slightly greater seating capacity and a better fuel economy over the S version. This version was briefly sold in the United Kingdom, in right hand drive.
- Intercity version called "Moovy" (unveiled in 2003) which was based on the Agora Line.

== Operators ==
Over 11,000 were built, mainly for European operators. Right hand drive countries for English and Australian bus operators have 1 door only.

=== Europe ===
The RATP Group was the largest purchaser with over 2,500. Standard Agora buses have been used in Greece by Athens bus operator OASA in two versions: diesel and CNG. In Spain the Agora (known as Renault/Irisbus Citybus) have been one of the most common buses in the 2000s and 2010s, with plenty of units in Málaga, Sevilla, Madrid, Valencia or Zaragoza from both Renault and Irisbus and also Standard and Long versions. In Czech Republic 321 Agora S (Citybus 12M) and 53 Agora L (Citybus 18M) were delivered to Prague and more than 350 buses to other Czech cities. They were manufactured in Karosa factory in Vysoké Mýto (today part of Iveco Bus).

=== United Kingdom ===
In England, 23 were bodied by Optare, the majority for Norfolk Green for its rural and urban services.

=== Australia ===
In Australia, a batch was ordered by King Brothers. Six Northcoast Bus & Coach bodied examples were delivered, however a larger order for Custom Coaches and Australian Bus Manufacturers bodied examples was reneged on and amongst the operators to purchase them were ACTION (20), Baxter's Coaches (5), Fearne's (5) and Thompsons Bus Service (5).

== Gallery ==
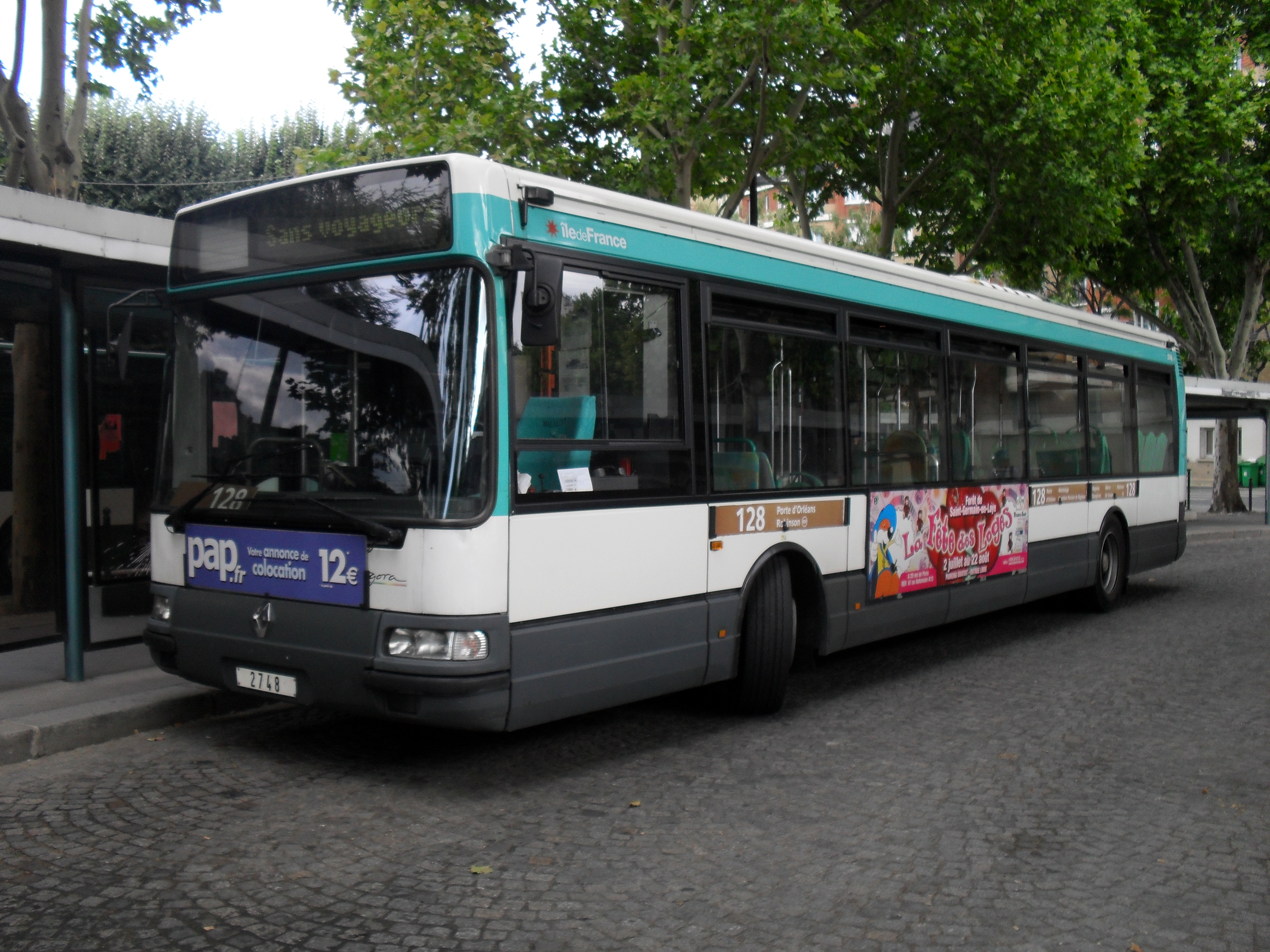
RATP Group Standard (S) Renault Agora in Paris in July 2010

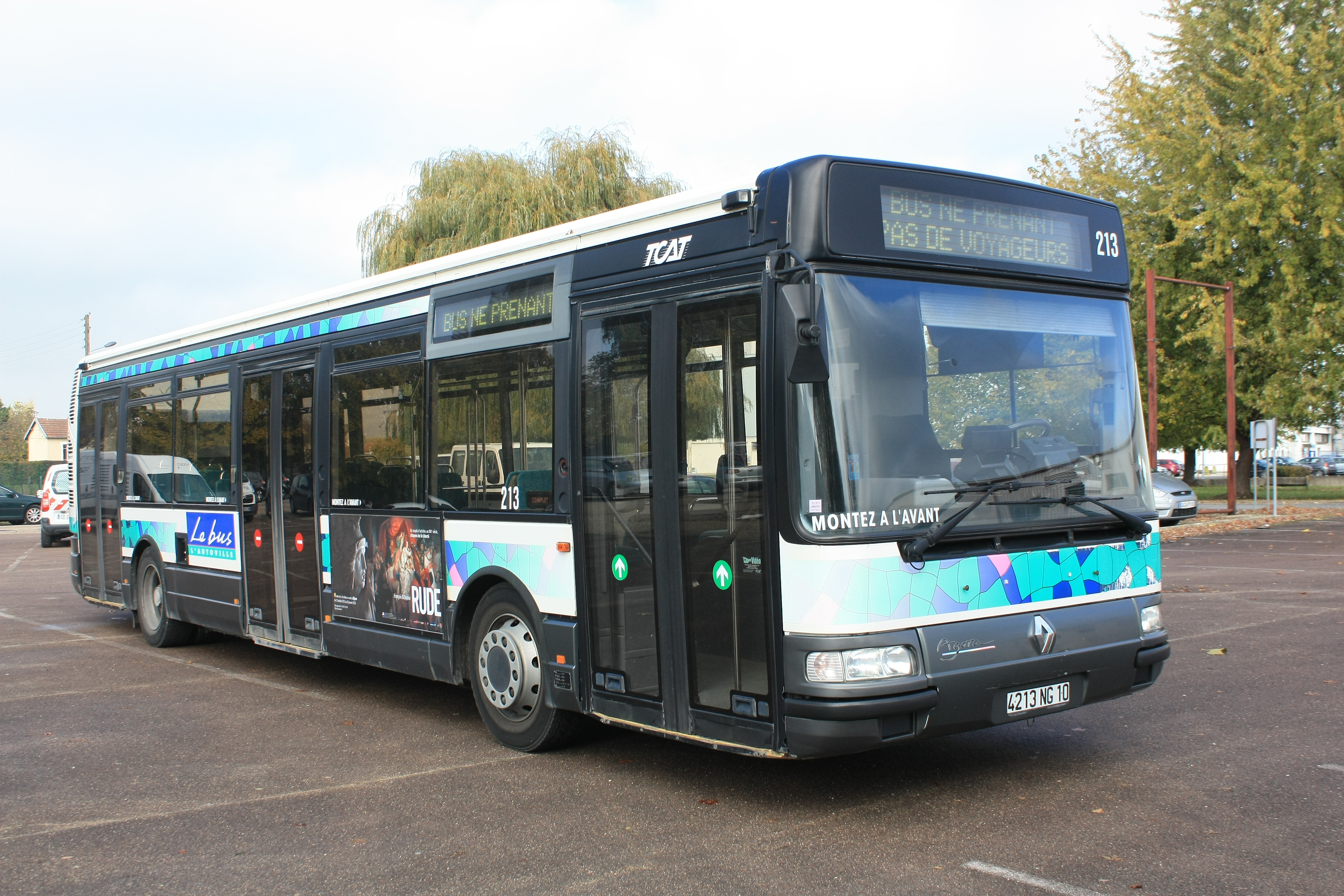
Standard (S) Renault Agora in Troyes in November 2012

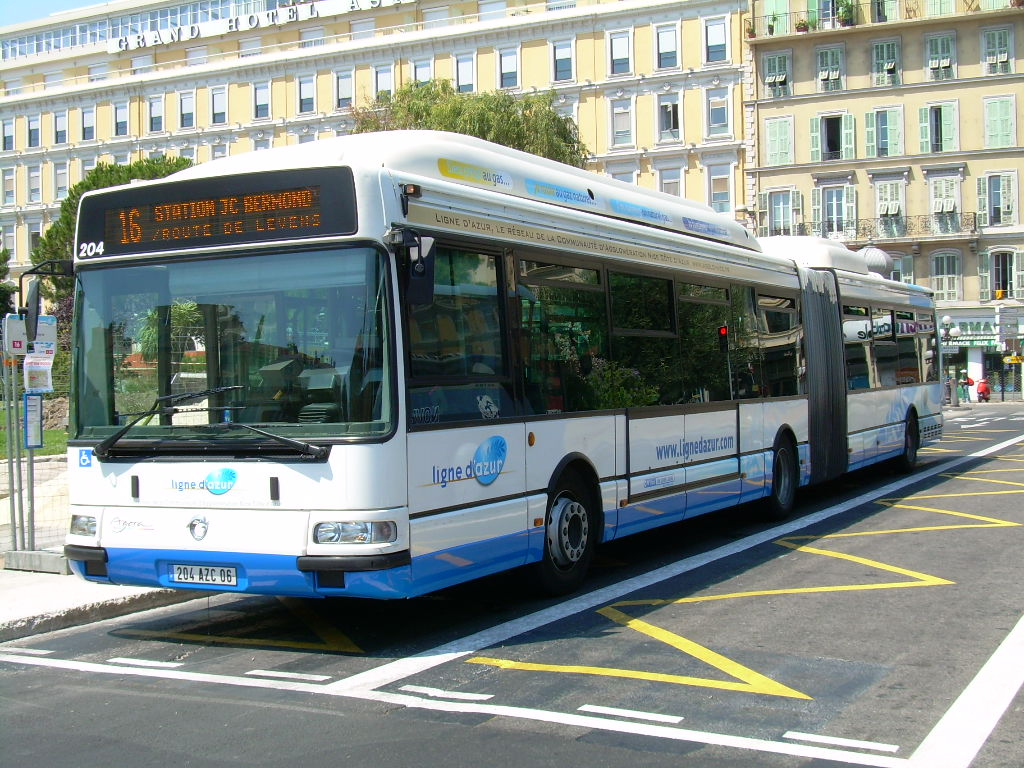
An Articulated (L) Irisbus Agora in Nice in July 2007

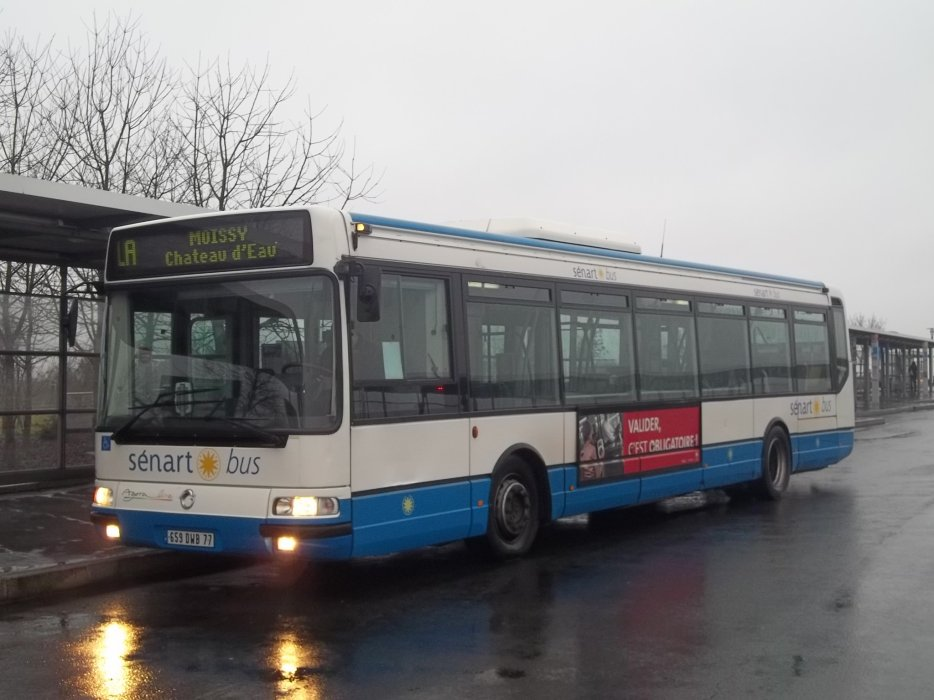
A Irisbus Agora Line in Lieusaint in January 2012

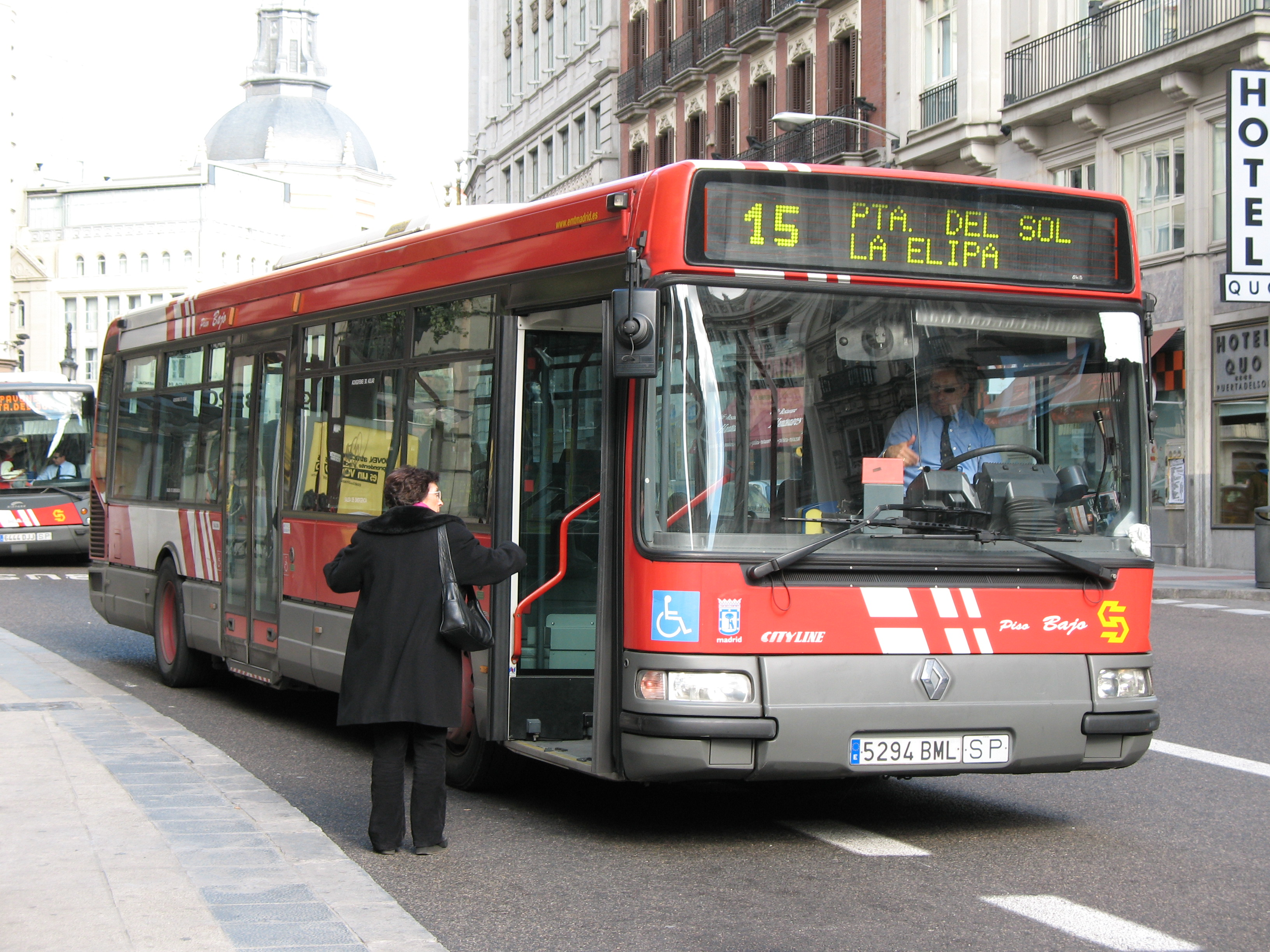
Empresa Municipal de Transportes de Madrid Renault Agora Line in Madrid in February 2007

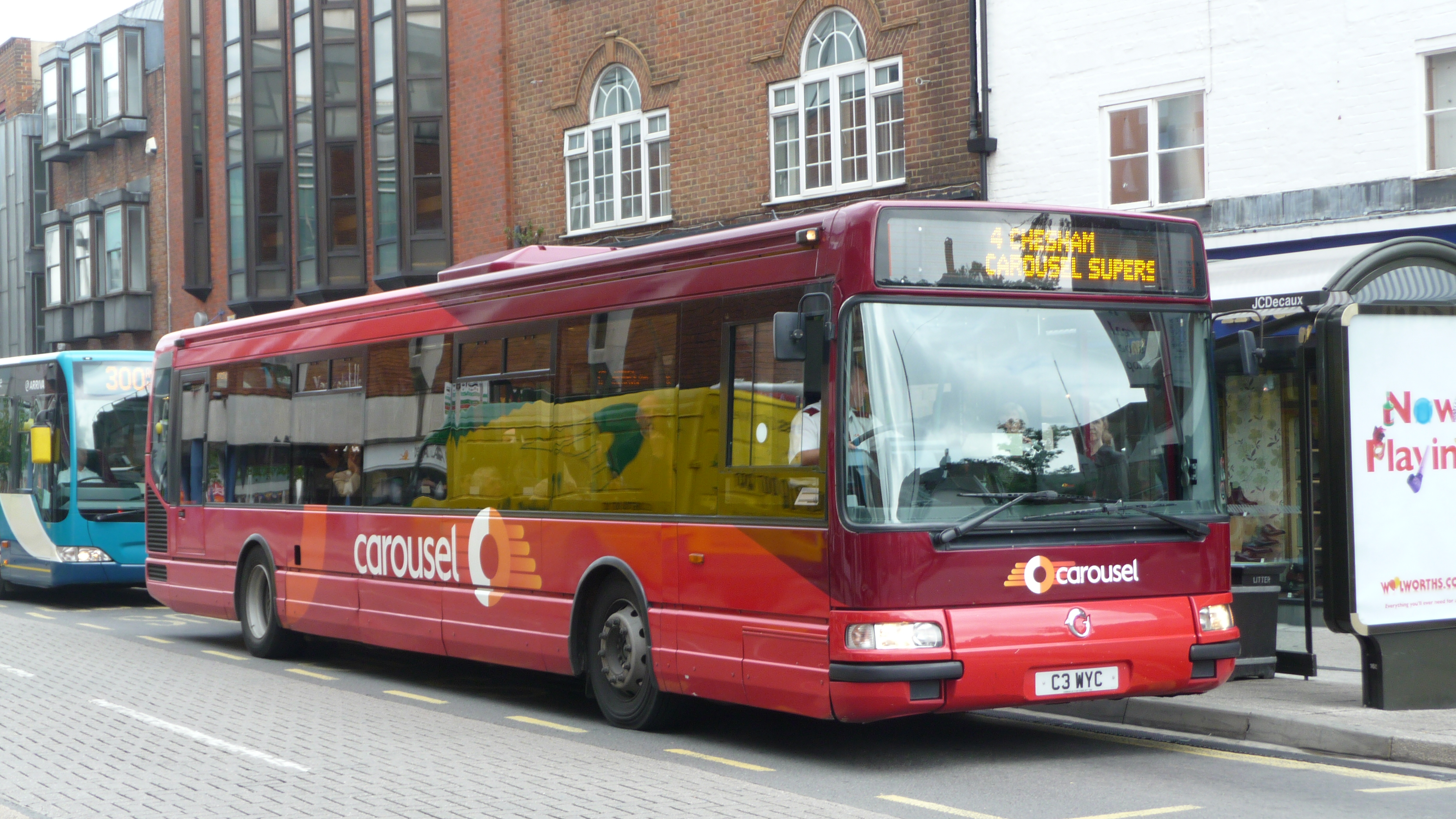
Carousel Buses Optare bodied Irisbus Agora Line in High Wycombe in July 2009

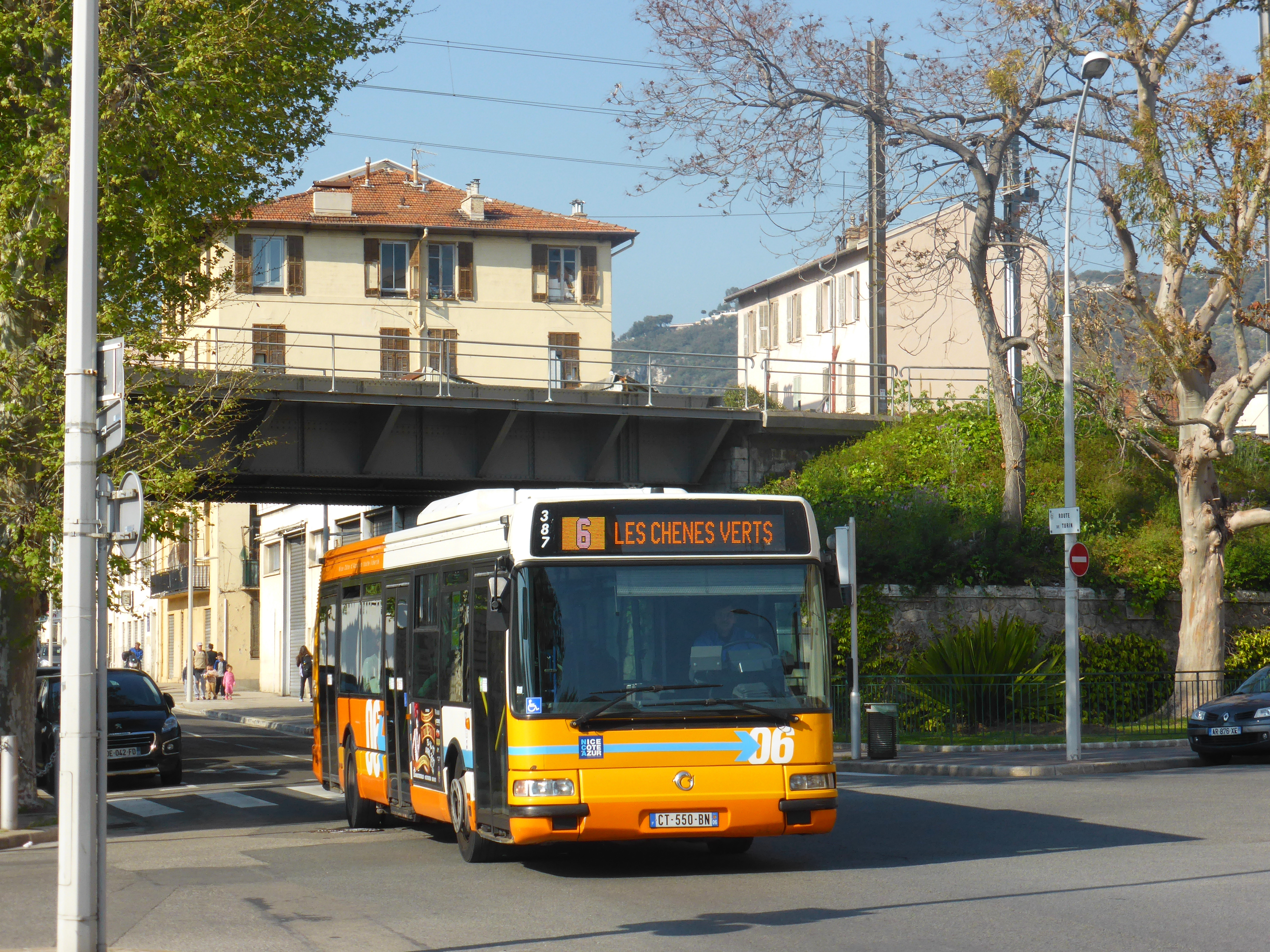
Lignes d'Azur's Irisbus Agora S in April 2017

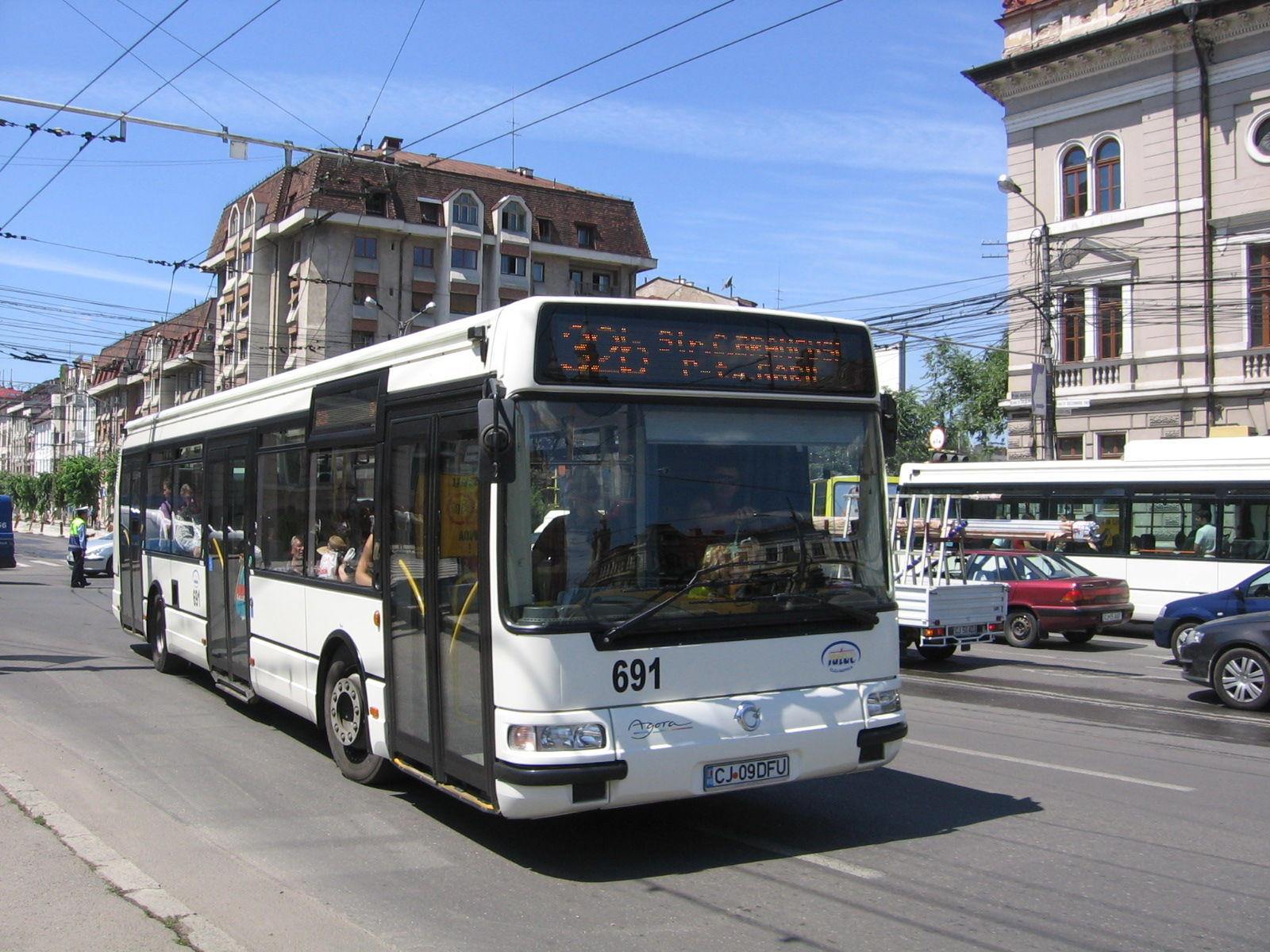
CTPCJ Irisbus Agora in Cluj-Napoca in July 2006

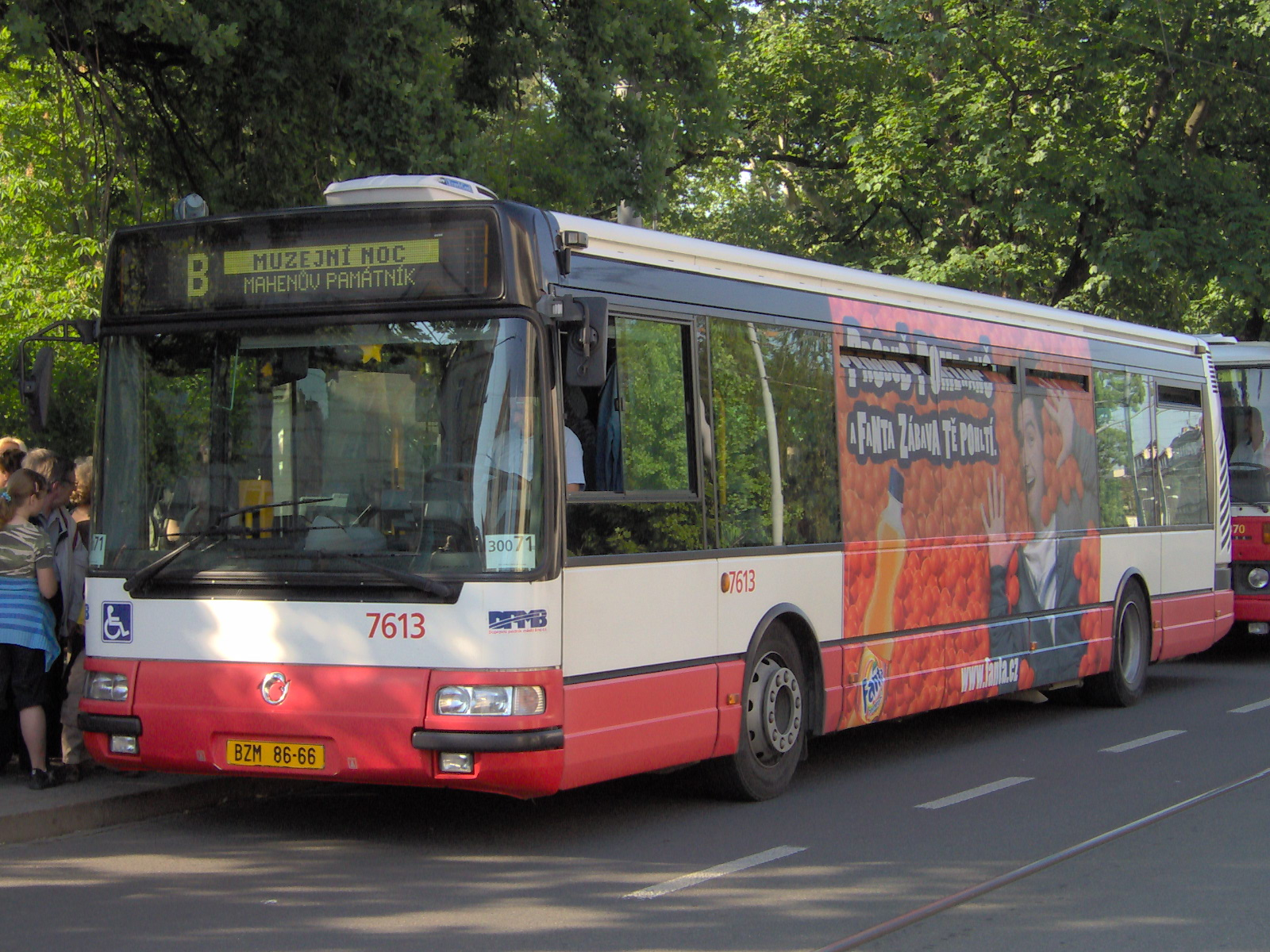
Irisbus Citybus 12M (S) in Brno in May 2007

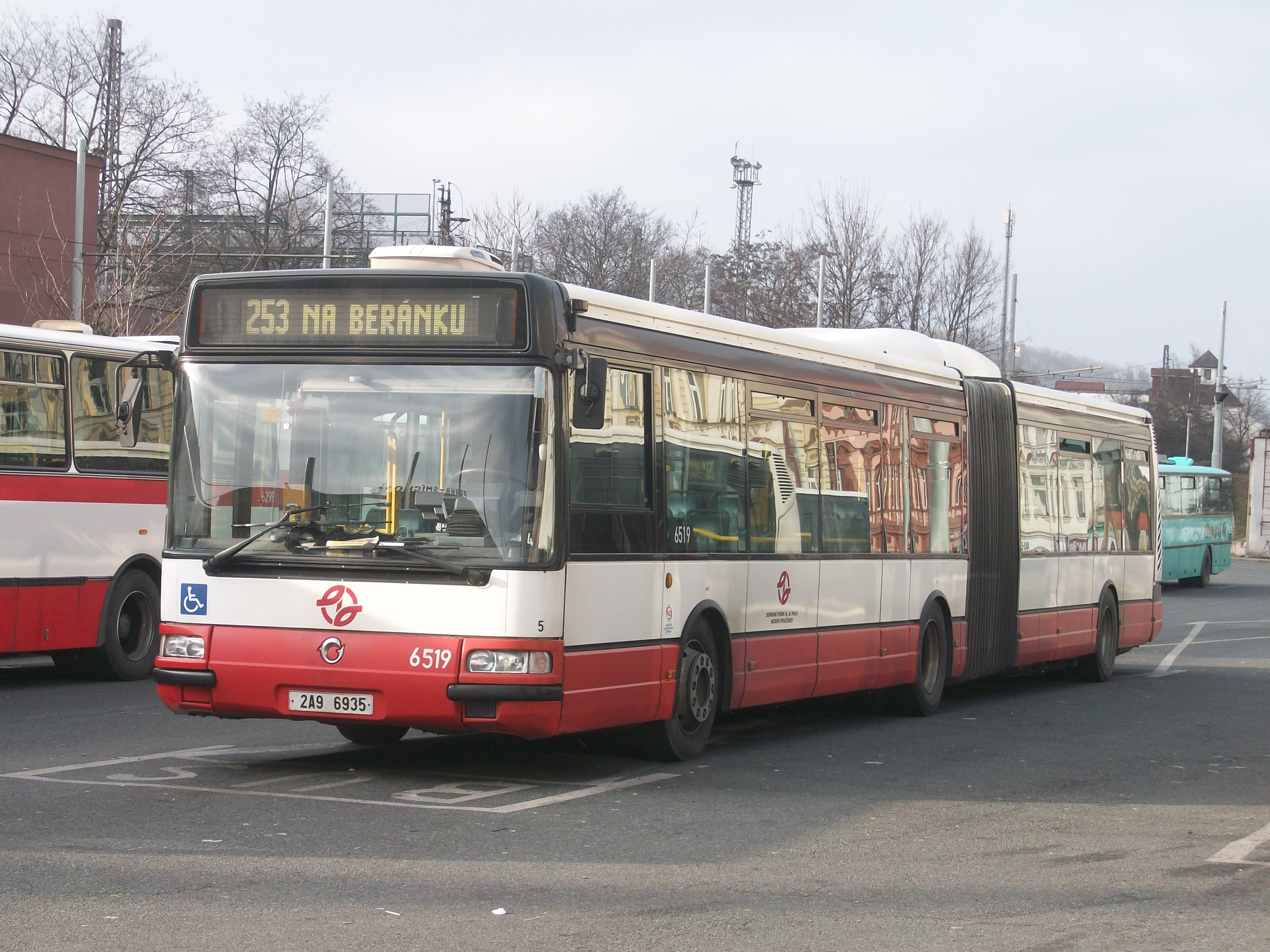
Irisbus Citybus 18M (L) in Prague in 2007

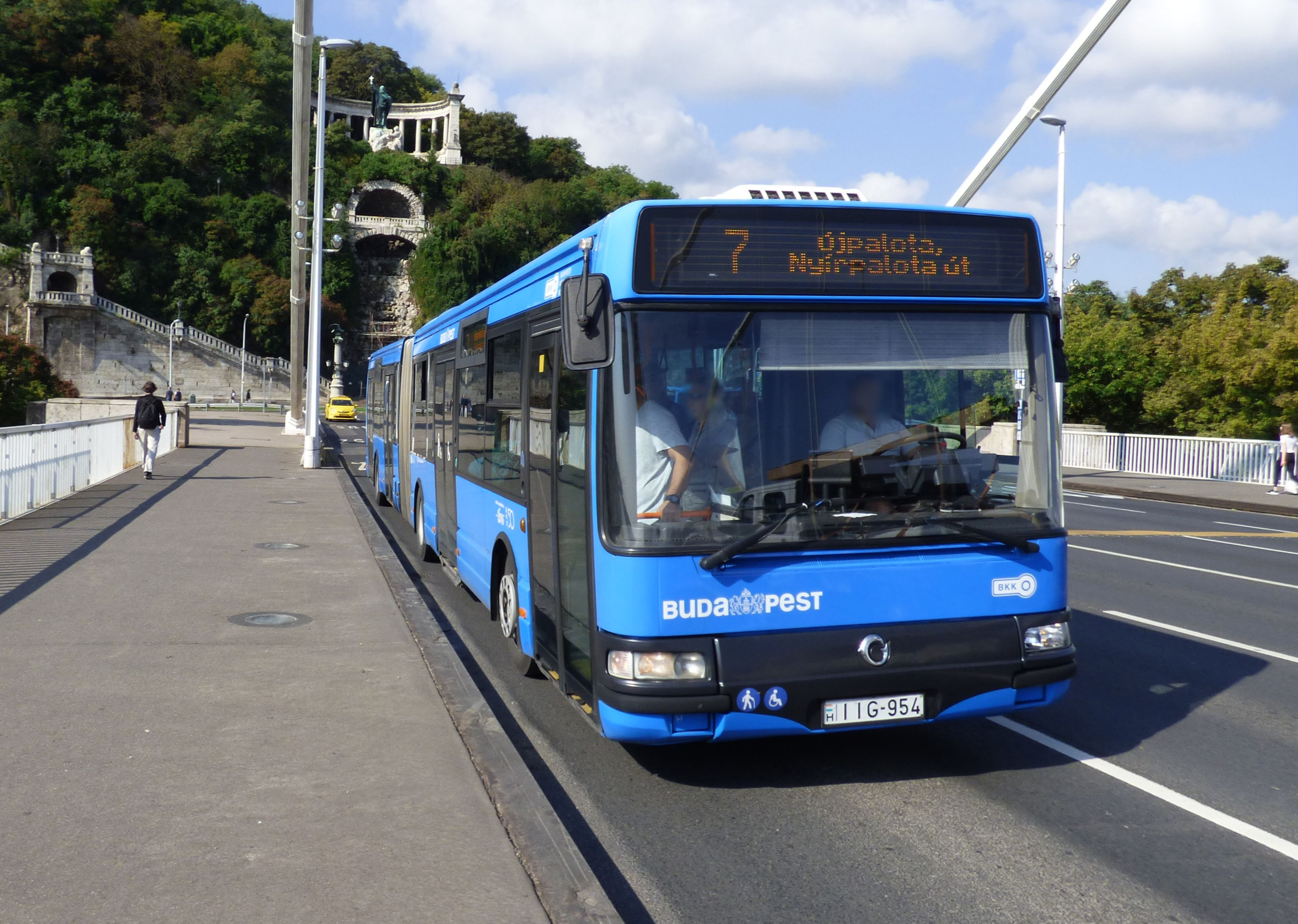
Budapesti Közlekedési Zrt. Irisbus Agora in 2018 in Budapest

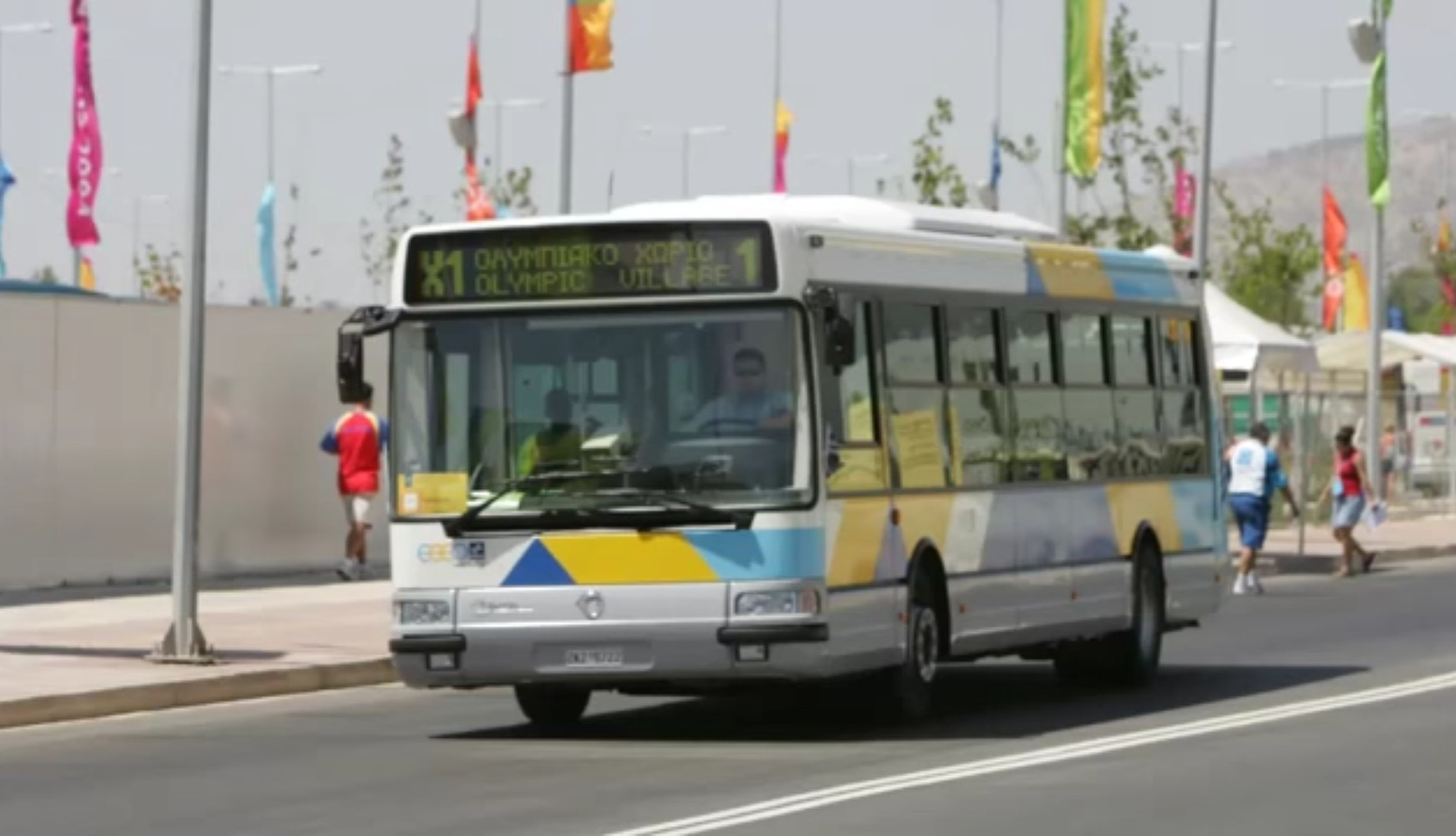
Irisbus Agora S in Olympic Village, Athens in August 2004
