= Thrall Car Manufacturing Company =

Rolling stock manufacturer

Coordinates: 41.4929°N 87.6114°W

Thrall Car Manufacturing Company was a manufacturer of railroad freight cars in Chicago Heights, Illinois from 1917 to 2001. The company was sold to Trinity Industries in 2001.

== Company history ==
A.J. Thrall established the Union Wagon Company in 1916, selling used and reconditioned rail car components. This became the Thrall Car Manufacturing Company in 1917. By mid-century, under the leadership of Richard L. Duchossois and Jerome Thrall the company focused on building specialized freight cars, such as high-cube boxcars for auto parts, all-door boxcars for building products, gondolas, rotary-dump gondolas for coal, bulkhead flatcars and centerbeam flatcars for lumber, double-stack container cars, covered hoppers, autorack cars and single-level trailer cars. In the 1980s, Thrall acquired five competing railcar manufacturers, including autorack builders Whitehead & Kales and Portec, and became the largest such manufacturer of these cars in the United States. In 1984, Duchossois purchased the remaining shares of the company owned by the Thrall family, and the company then operated as part of Duchossois Industries. In the 1990s, Thrall had a production capacity of over 16,000 freight cars per year, with more than 3,000 employees.

From 1997 until 2002, Thrall manufactured wagons at the York Carriage Works in England. In 2000, Thrall acquired the railway vehicle manufacturer ČKD Vagonka Studénka (Czech Republic), renamed Thrall Vagonka Studénka, a.s.. (In 2006 Trinity Industries sold off its European operations to International Railway Systems)

The closely held company was sold to Trinity Industries, based in Dallas, Texas, in 2001. The company was subsequently renamed Trinity Rail Group, LLC.

== Products ==
Thrall was mainly a freight car fabrication and assembly operation. Additional car types manufactured included boxcars and gondolas. Most cars were designed for standard gauge interchange service on AAR-approved railroads within North America. Many tri-level autoracks built by Thrall exist today, identifiable by the blue Thrall rectangle logo present on either the extreme right or left end of the car side. Cast or forged parts, such as grab irons, trucks, axles, and wheels, were purchased from suppliers from the Chicago area.

== Manufacturing locations ==
- Chicago Heights Plant No. 1. Original plant at 26th street. Includes a plant office, main factory, and outdoor crane. This plant was served by the Union Pacific.
- Chicago Heights Plant No. 2. 1964 plant at 26th and State Street. This was headquarters at the sale to Trinity. The site includes an office, assembly building, paint shop, fabricating building, and jig/fixtures facility, as well as outdoor cranes. The plant was served by Union Pacific and Elgin, Joliet & Eastern Railway.

Both of the Chicago Heights facilities have been redeveloped.

- Cartersville, Georgia plant. Still owned by Trinity Industries.
- Clinton, Illinois plant.
- Harvey, Illinois, Parts Depot. Sometimes described as Phoenix, Illinois.
- Winder, Georgia plant. This plant operated with a peak employment of over 1,000 in 1998–1999, but a dramatic downturn in the economy led to the closing of the plant and layoffs of all employees. Although the layoffs were termed "temporary," the plant never reopened under Thrall's ownership. Following the purchase by Trinity Industries the plant reopened, operating at a much smaller level until 2020 where it was mothballed. This facility was sold in 2022 and purchased by Metal Benderz.
- Additional plants were located in the United Kingdom, and the Czech Republic.

== See also ==
- List of rolling stock manufacturers
