= Astra Citelis =

Urban solo trolleybus

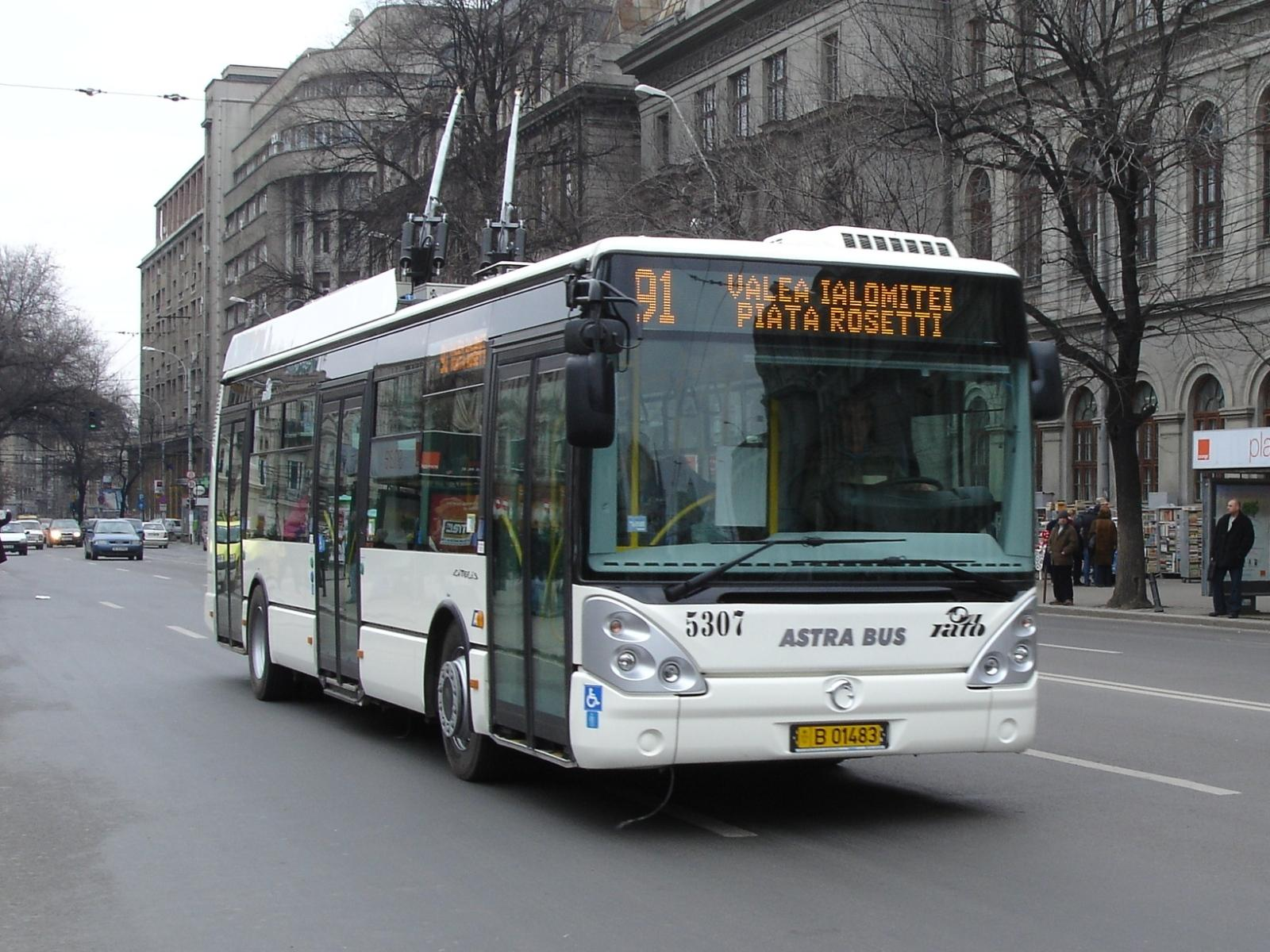
A STB Bucharest Astra Citelis PS01T1

The Astra Citelis is an urban solo trolleybus with a low floor, bodywork by Astra Bus Arad, Romania, on an Irisbus Citelis under frame (Iveco’s division for passenger transportation vehicles), and outfitted with equipment provided by ICPE SAERP Bucharest. Trolleybus electric thrusters are the latest generation with low power consumption and regenerative electric brakes. Digital control of all systems of electric buses allow easy maintenance and repair of the vehicle.
