= OCFTC =

Lebanese government transportation authority

O.C.F.T.C (Office des Chemins de Fer et des Transports en Commun, French for Railway and Public Transportation Authority) is the Lebanese government authority which operates public transportation in Lebanon. The OCFTC currently operates 12 bus lines in and around the capital city of Beirut.

The OCFTC's main competitor is the privately owned and operated Lebanese Commuting Company (LCC). The OCFTC also owns all of the railway infrastructure in the country, however, as the railway system was severely damaged during Lebanese Civil War, none of the railway system is currently in operation.
