= Natural gas vehicle =

Vehicle powered by natural gas

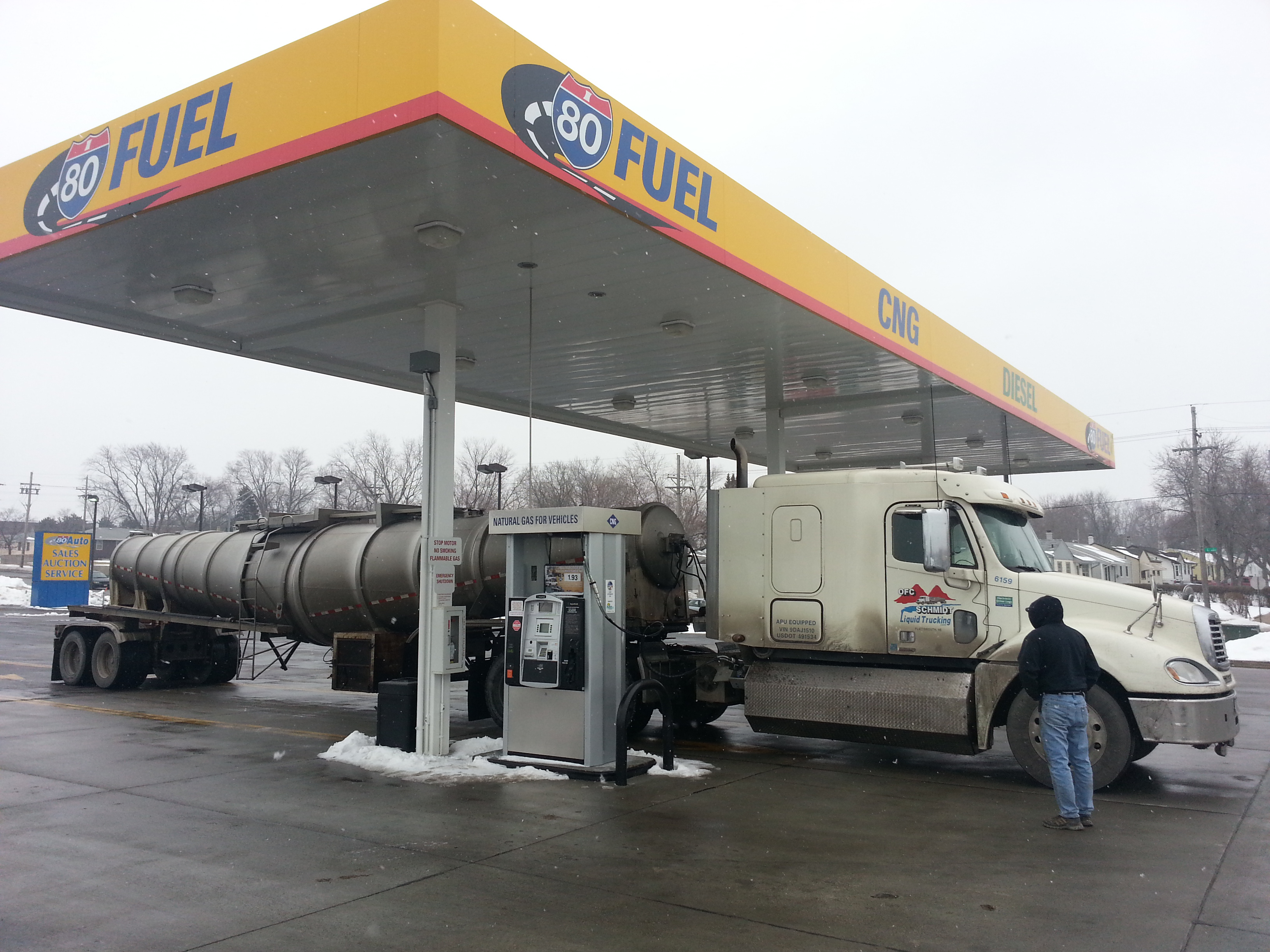
Truck running with Guidetti CNG system

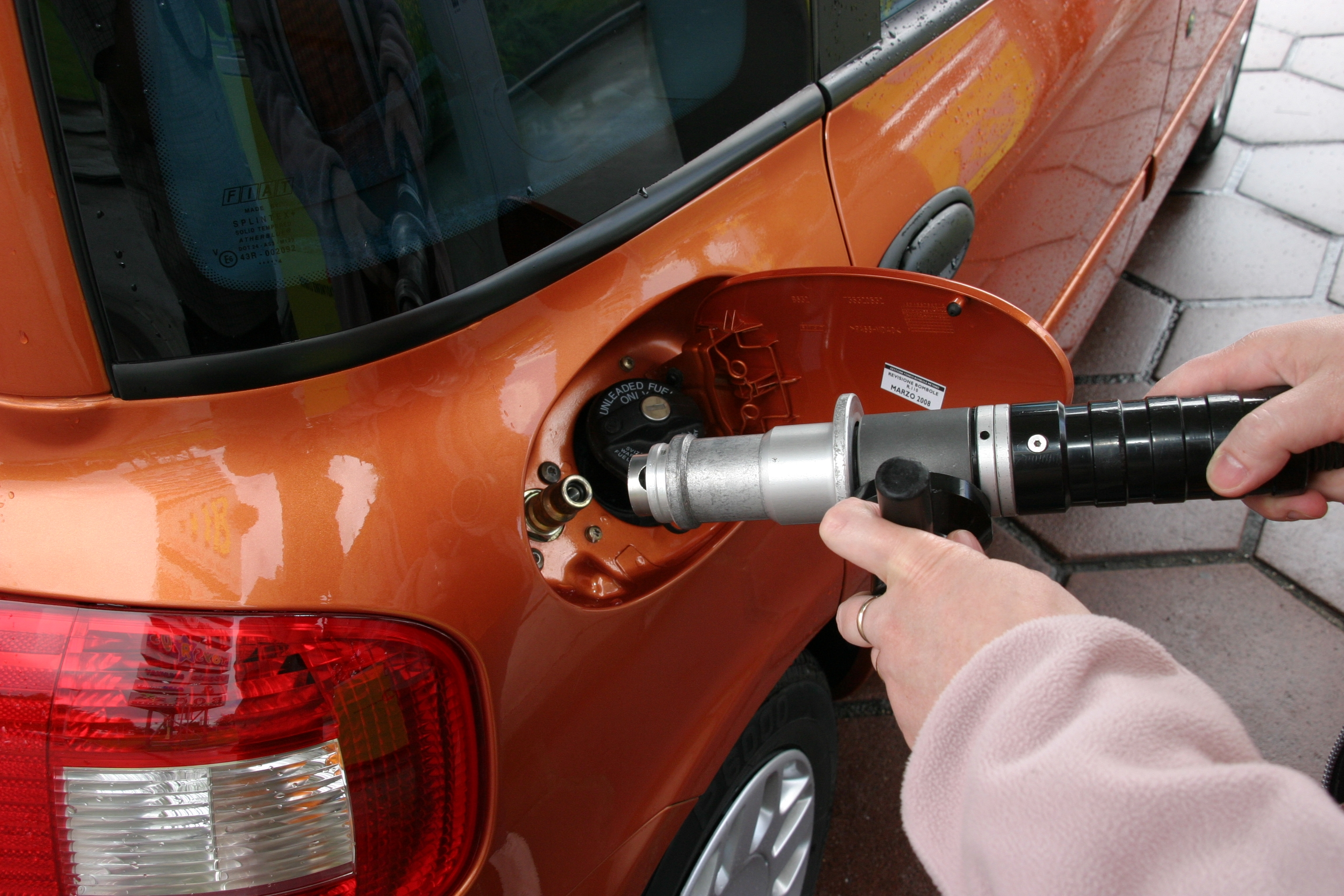
Fueling a Fiat Multipla with compressed natural gas

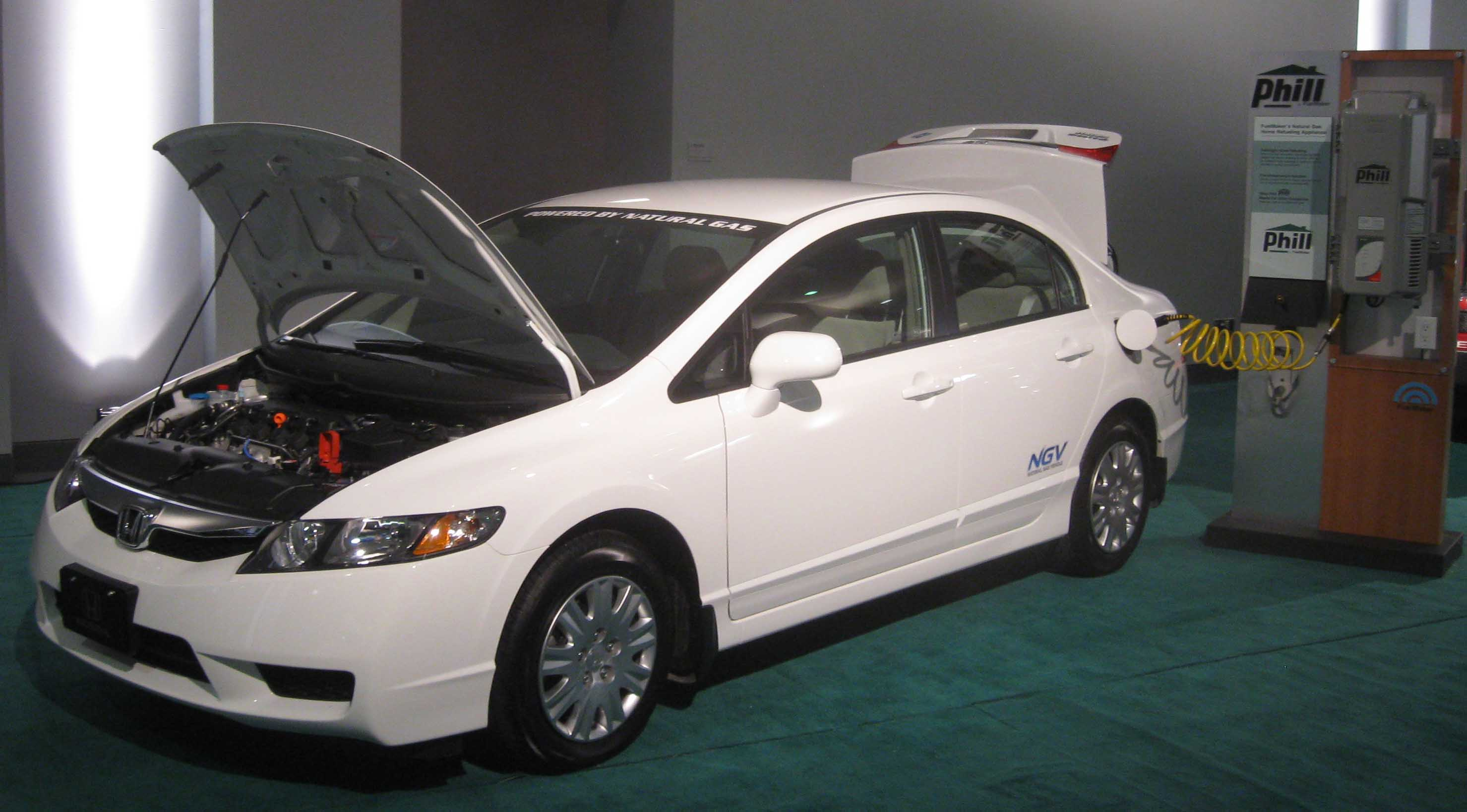
2009 Honda Civic GX hooked up to Phill refueling fuel system

A natural gas vehicle (NGV) utilizes compressed natural gas (CNG) or liquefied natural gas (LNG) as an alternative fuel source. Distinguished from autogas vehicles fueled by liquefied petroleum gas (LPG), NGVs rely on methane combustion, resulting in cleaner emissions due to the removal of contaminants from the natural gas source.

Conversion of existing gasoline or diesel vehicles to NGVs is feasible, offering both dedicated and bi-fuel options. Heavy-duty vehicles such as trucks and buses can also undergo conversion, utilizing spark ignition systems or hybrid electric motor configurations.

Challenges in NGV adoption include the storage and refueling of natural gas, given its pressurized or liquefied state. While advancements in compression and liquefaction mitigate energy density differences, trade-offs regarding storage container size, complexity, and weight continue to affect vehicle range. Despite these challenges, the safety and cost advantages of methane over hydrogen fuel contribute to its viability.

Obstacles to widespread NGV adoption for private vehicles include concerns over additional weight, technological unfamiliarity, and limited refueling infrastructure in some regions. Nevertheless, global NGV numbers reached nearly 28 million by 2019, with significant market presence in countries such as China, Iran, India, Pakistan, Argentina, Brazil, and Italy.

== Advantages ==
CNG may be generated and used for bulk storage and pipeline transport of renewable energy and also be mixed with biomethane, itself derived from biogas from landfills or anaerobic digestion. This enables the use of CNG in mobility, resulting in significantly lower carbon emissions compared to regular diesel-powered vehicles . It would also allow the continued use of CNG vehicles currently powered by non-renewable fossil fuels so that those vehicles do not become obsolete if stricter CO_{2} emissions regulations are mandated to combat climate change.

A key advantage of using natural gas is the existence, in principle, of most of the infrastructure and supply chain, which is non-interchangeable with hydrogen. Methane today mostly comes from non-renewable sources but can be supplied or produced from renewable sources, offering net carbon-neutral mobility. In many markets, especially the Americas, natural gas may trade at a discount to other fossil fuel products such as petrol, diesel or coal, or indeed be a less valuable by-product associated with their production that has to be disposed of. Many countries also provide tax incentives for natural gas-powered vehicles due to the environmental benefits to society. Lower operating costs and government incentives to reduce pollution from heavy vehicles in urban areas have driven the adoption of NGV for commercial and public uses, i.e. trucks and buses.

== Challenges ==
Despite its advantages, the use of natural gas vehicles faces several limitations, including fuel storage and infrastructure available for delivery and distribution at fueling stations. CNG must be stored in high-pressure cylinders (21,000 to 25,000 kPa (3,000 to 3,600 psi)), and LNG must be stored in cryogenic cylinders (−162 to −129 °C (−260 to −200 °F)). These cylinders take up more space than gasoline or diesel tanks that can be molded in intricate shapes to store more fuel and use less on-vehicle space. CNG tanks are sometimes located in the vehicle's trunk or pickup bed, reducing the space for other cargo. This problem is sometimes mitigated by installing the tanks under the vehicle's body or on the roof (typical for buses), leaving cargo areas free. As with alternative fuels, other barriers to the widespread use of NGVs are natural gas distribution and the lower number of CNG and LNG stations than gasoline and diesel stations.

Other challenges include relatively expensive and environmentally insensitive but convenience-seeking private individuals; good profits and taxes extractable from small-batch sales of value-added, branded petrol and diesel fuels via established trade channels and oil refiners; resistance and safety concerns to increasing gas inventories in urban areas; dual-use of utility distribution networks originally built for home gas supply and allocation of network expansion costs; reluctance, effort and costs associated with switching; prestige and nostalgia associated with petroleum vehicles; fear of redundancy and disruption. A particular challenge may be that refiners are currently set up to produce a certain fuel mix from crude oil. Aviation fuel is likely to remain the fuel of choice for aircraft due to its weight sensitivity for the foreseeable future

== Infrastructure ==
NGV filling stations can be located anywhere natural gas lines exist. Compressors (CNG) or liquefaction plants (LNG) are usually built on a large scale, but small home CNG refueling stations are possible. A company called Fuel Maker pioneered a system called Phil Home Refueling Appliance (known as "Phil"), which they developed in partnership with Honda for the American GX model. Phil is now manufactured and sold by BRC Fuel Maker, a division of Fuel Systems Solutions, Inc.

== Deployment ==
The Asia-Pacific region leads the world with 6.8 million vehicles, followed by Latin America with 4.2 million. In Latin America, almost 90% of NGVs have bi-fuel engines, allowing these vehicles to run on either gasoline or CNG. In Pakistan, almost every vehicle converted to (or manufactured for) alternative fuel use typically retains the capability of running on gasoline.

As of 2016, the U.S. had a fleet of 160,000 NG vehicles, including 3,176 LNG vehicles. Other countries where natural gas-powered buses are popular include India, Australia, Argentina, Germany, and Greece. In OECD countries, there are around 500,000 CNG vehicles. Pakistan's market share of NGVs was 61.1% in 2010, followed by Armenia with more than 77% (2014), and Bolivia with 20%. The number of NGV refueling stations has also increased to 18,202 worldwide as of 2010, up 10.2% from the previous year.

== CNG/LNG as fuel for automobiles ==
An increasing number of vehicles worldwide are being manufactured to run on CNG by major carmakers. Until recently, the Honda Civic GX was the only NGV commercially available in the US market. More recently, Ford, General Motors and Ram Trucks have bi-fuel offerings in their vehicle lineup. In 2006, the Brazilian subsidiary of FIAT introduced the Fiat Siena Tetra fuel, a four-fuel car that can run on natural gas (CNG).

CNG-powered vehicles are considered safer than gasoline-powered ones.

=== Available production cars ===
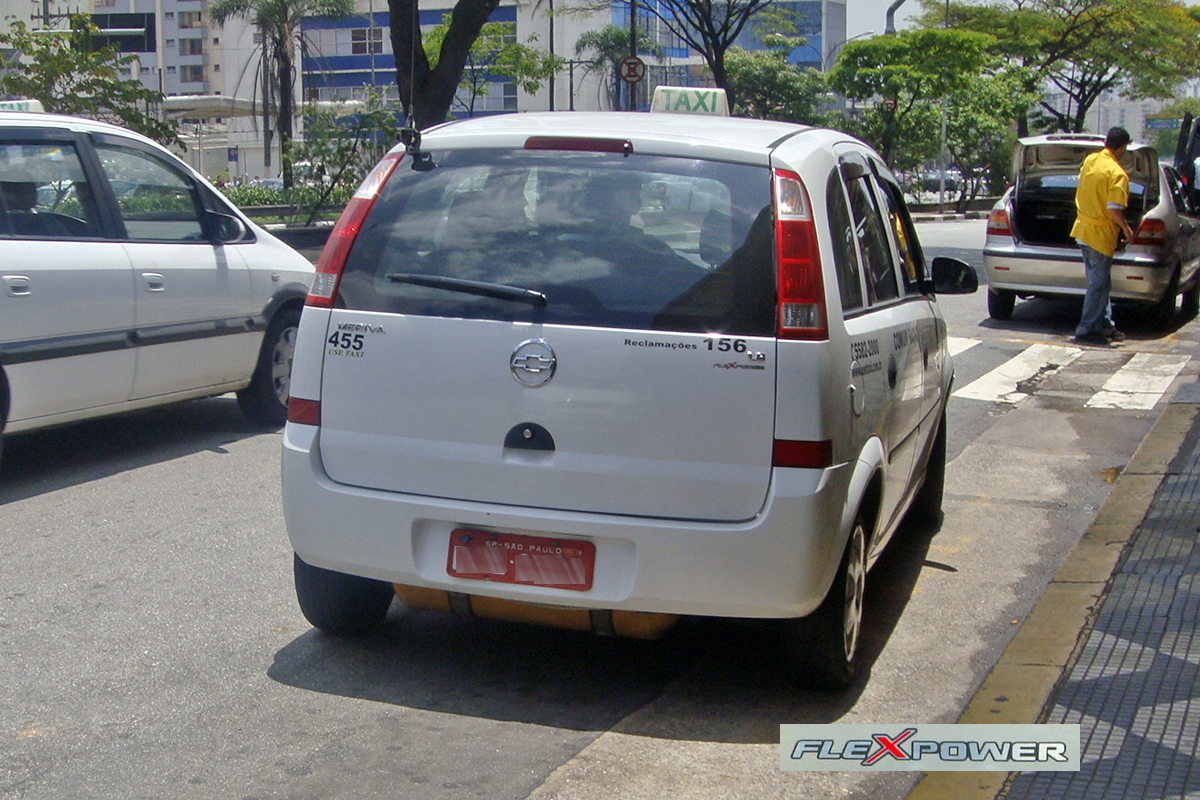
Brazilian flexible-fuel taxi retrofitted to run also as an NGV with CNG tanks underneath the body in the rear

Existing gasoline-powered vehicles may be converted to run on CNG or LNG, and can be dedicated (running only on natural gas) or bi-fuel (running on either gasoline or natural gas). However, an increasing number of vehicles worldwide are being manufactured to run on CNG. Until recently, the now-discontinued Honda Civic GX was the only NGV commercially available in the US market. More recently, Ford, General Motors and Ram Trucks have bi-fuel offerings in their vehicle lineup. Ford's approach is to offer a bi-fuel prep kit as a factory option and then have the customer choose an authorized partner to install the natural gas equipment. Choosing GM's bi-fuel option sends the HD pickups with the 6.0L gasoline engine to IMPCO in Indiana to upfit the vehicle to run on CNG. Ram currently is the only pickup truck manufacturer with a truly CNG factory-installed bi-fuel system available in the U.S. market.

Outside the U.S. GM do Brasil introduced the Multipower engine in 2004, which was capable of using CNG, alcohol, and gasoline (E20-E25 blend) as fuel. It was used in the Chevrolet Astra 2.0 model 2005, aimed at the taxi market. In 2006, the Brazilian subsidiary of FIAT introduced the Fiat Siena Tetra fuel, a four-fuel car developed under Magneti Marelli of Fiat Brazil. This automobile can run on natural gas (CNG); 100% ethanol (E100); E20 to E25 gasoline blend, Brazil's mandatory gasoline; and pure gasoline. However, it is no longer available in Brazil but is used in other neighboring countries.

In 2015, Honda decided to phase out the commercialization of natural-gas-powered vehicles to focus on the development of a new generation of electrified vehicles such as hybrids, plug-in electric cars and hydrogen-powered fuel cell vehicles. Since 2008, Honda sold about 16,000 natural gas vehicles, mainly to taxi and commercial fleets.

=== Differences between LNG and CNG fuels ===
Though LNG and CNG are both considered NGVs, the technologies are vastly different. Refueling equipment, fuel cost, pumps, tanks, hazards, and capital costs are different.

One thing they share is that due to engines made for gasoline, computer-controlled valves to control fuel mixtures are required for both of them, often being proprietary and specific to the manufacturer. The on-engine technology for fuel metering is the same for LNG and CNG.

=== CNG as an auto fuel ===
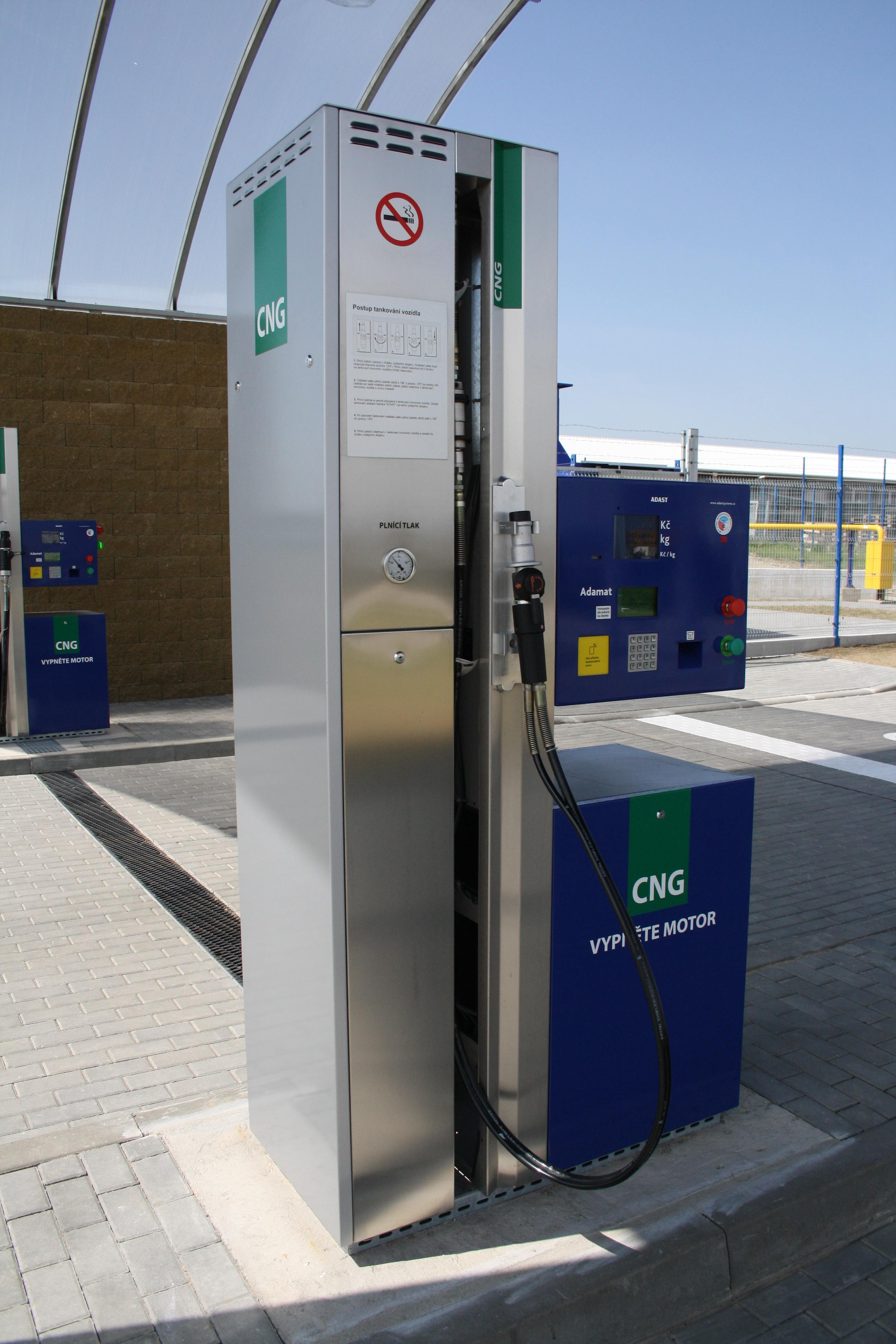
CNG pump in Třebíč, Czech Republic

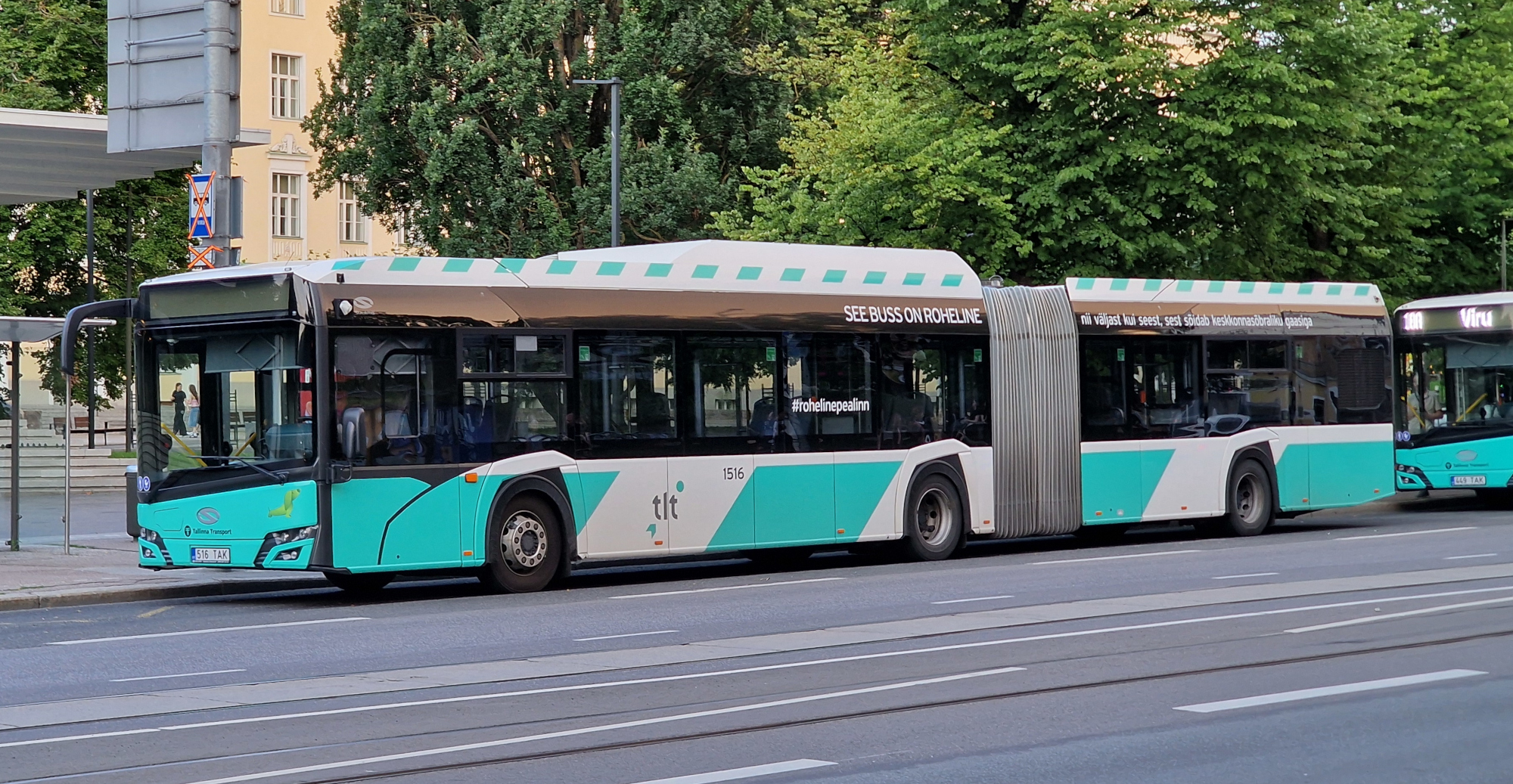
A CNG powered bus in Tallinn, Estonia

CNG, or compressed natural gas, is stored at high pressure, 210 to 250 bar (3,000 to 3,600 psi). The required tank is more massive and costly than a conventional fuel tank. Commercial on-demand refueling stations are more expensive to operate than LNG stations because of the energy required for compression; the compressor requires 100 times more electrical power. However, slow-fill (many hours) can be cost-effective with LNG stations [missing citation - the initial liquefaction of natural gas by cooling requires more energy than gas compression]. The time to fill a CNG tank varies greatly depending on the station. Home refuels typically fill at about 1 kg/h (0.4 GGE/h). At gas stations, where the pressure is greatly higher, it is possible to refill a 25 kg (10 GGE) tank in 5–10 minutes. Also, because of the lower energy density, the CNG range is lower compared to LNG. Gas composition and throughput allowing, it should be feasible to connect commercial CNG fueling stations to city gas networks or enable home fueling of CNG vehicles directly using a gas compressor. Similar to a car battery, the CNG tank of a car could double as a home energy storage device, and the compressor could be powered at times when there is excess / free renewable electrical energy.

=== LNG as an auto fuel ===
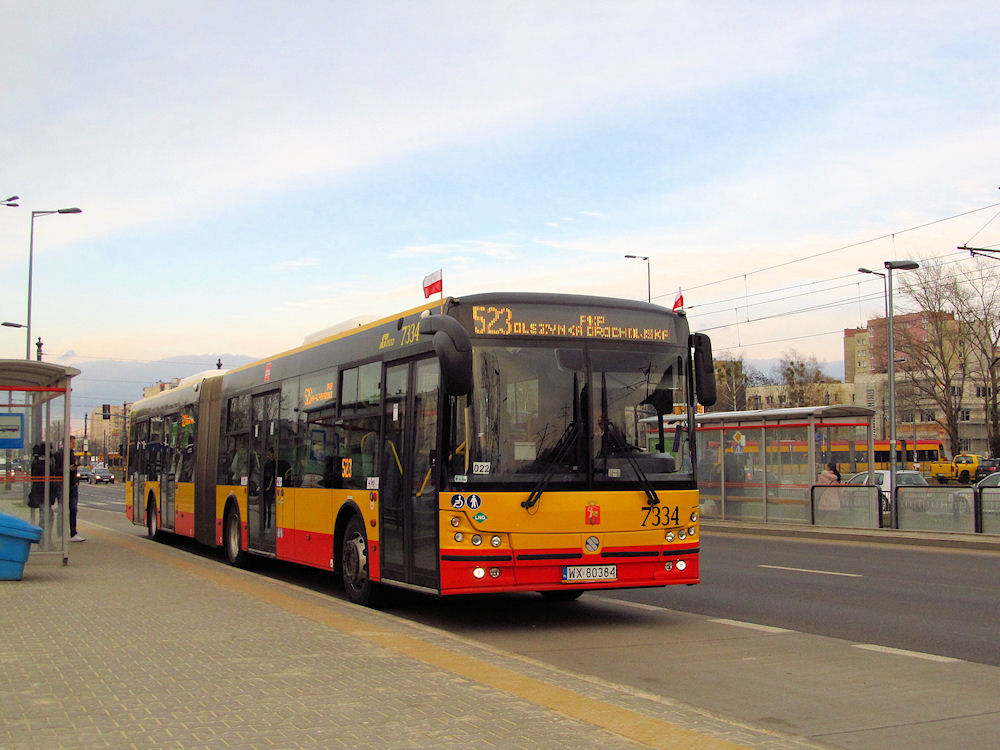
An LNG powered bus in Warsaw, Poland

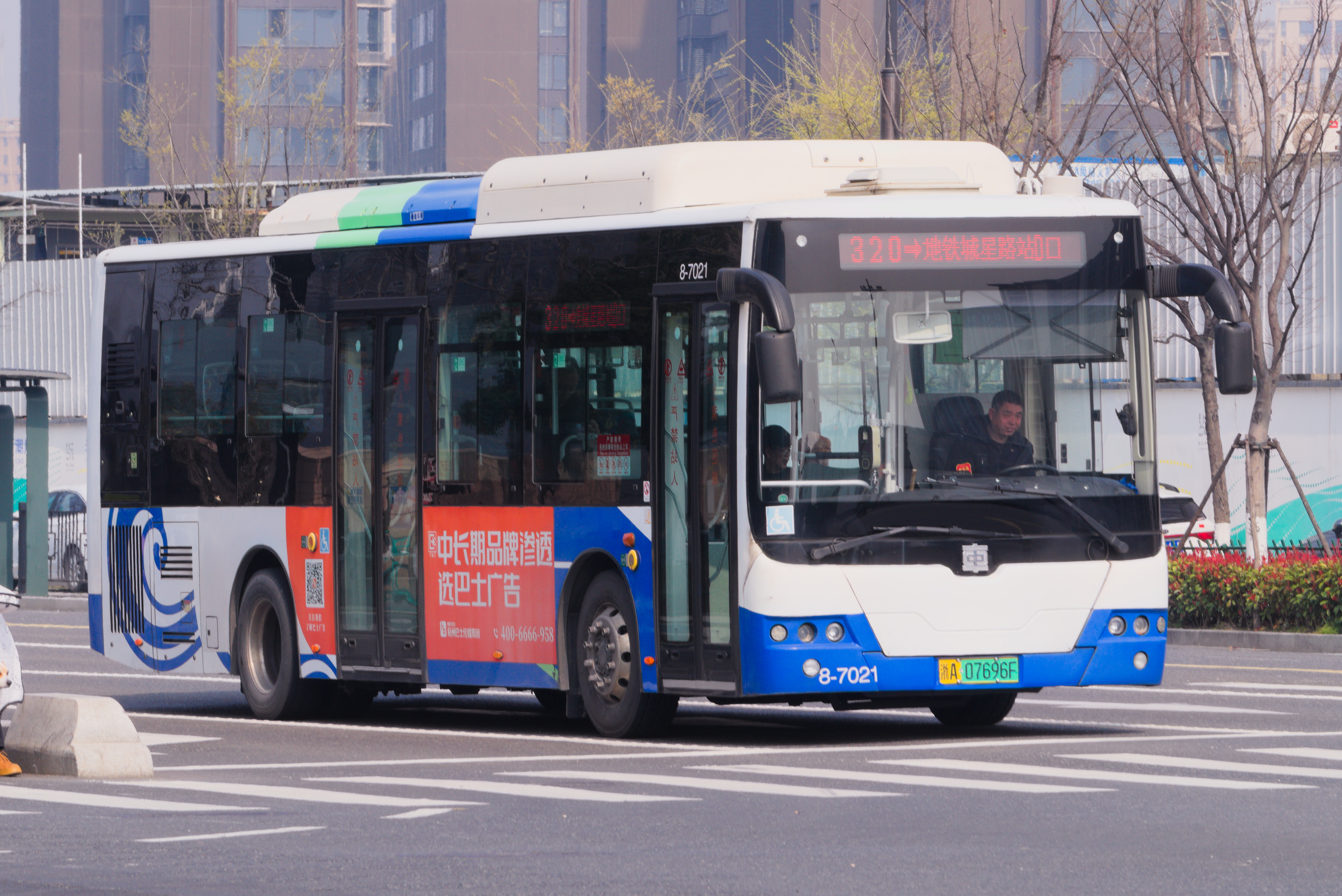
An LNG-electric hybrid powered bus in Hangzhou, China

LNG, or liquified natural gas, is natural gas that has been cooled to the point that it is a cryogenic liquid. Its liquid state is still more than twice as dense as CNG. LNG is either dispensed from bulk storage tanks or made locally from utility pipes at LNG fuel stations. Because of its cryogenic nature, it is stored in specially designed insulated tanks. Generally speaking, these tanks operate at fairly low pressures (about 5 to 10 bar (72.5 to 145.0 psi)) when compared to CNG. A vaporizer is mounted in the fuel system, turning the LNG into a gas (which may be considered low-pressure CNG). When comparing a commercial LNG station with a CNG station, utility infrastructure, capital cost, and electricity heavily favor LNG over CNG, but the availability of piped gas is more common than LNG delivery by tanker. There are existing LCNG stations (CNG and LNG), where fuel is stored as LNG, then vaporized to CNG on demand. LCNG stations require less capital cost than fast-fill CNG stations alone but more than LNG stations.

Aside from different fuel tanks, fuel metering, and computer modules, the engines in NG vehicles could be run by CNG or LNG without requiring any modification because both are forms of natural gas.

=== Advantages over gasoline and diesel ===
LNG – and especially CNG – tends to corrode and wear the parts of an engine less rapidly than gasoline. Thus, it is quite common to find diesel-engine NGVs with high mileages (over 800,000 km (500,000 miles)). CNG also emits 20-29% less CO_{2} than diesel and gasoline. Emissions are cleaner, with lower emissions of carbon and lower particulate emissions per equivalent distance traveled. There is generally less wasted fuel. However, the cost (monetary, environmental, pre-existing infrastructure) of distribution, compression, and cooling must be taken into account. In addition, natural gas has a higher Octane rating than gasoline, with an octane rating of 112 RON/105 AKI for propane and 120 RON/120 AKI for methane, making it less likely to cause engine knocking.

=== Inherent advantages/disadvantages between autogas (LPG) power and NGV ===
Autogas, also known as LPG or propane, has a different chemical composition. However, it is still a petroleum-based gas produced from refining petroleum oil and has several inherent advantages and disadvantages, as well as noninherent ones. The inherent advantage of autogas over CNG is that it requires far less compression (20% of CNG cost), is denser and easier to store as at this lower pressure it is a liquid at room temperature, and thus requires far cheaper tanks (consumer) and fuel compressors (provider) than CNG. As compared to LNG, it requires no chilling (and thus less energy) or problems associated with the extreme cold such as frostbite. Like NGVs, it also has advantages over gasoline and diesel in terms of cleaner emissions and less wear on engines than gasoline. A major drawback of LPG is its safety. The fuel is volatile and flammable, and the fumes are heavier than air, which causes them to collect in a low spot in the event of a leak, making it far more hazardous to use. More care is needed in handling this. Besides this, LPG (40% from Crude Oil refining) has historically been more expensive than Natural Gas, even though the energy density per weight is higher.

==== Current advantages of LPG power over NGV ====
In places like the US, Thailand, and India, there are five to ten times more LPG stations, thus making the fuel more accessible than NGV stations. In some countries like Poland, South Korea, and Turkey, LPG stations and autos are widespread, while NGVs are not. In addition, retail LPG fuel is considerably cheaper in some countries, such as Thailand.

=== Future possibilities ===
Though ANG (adsorbed natural gas) has not yet been used in either providing stations nor consumer storage tanks, its low compression (34 bar (500 psi) vs 250 bar (3,600 psi)) has the potential to drive down costs of NGV infrastructure and vehicle tanks.

== LNG fueled vehicles ==
As of 2014, two common types of engines used on heavy NG-fueled vehicles were stoichiometric spark-ignited ones (Otto cycle) and lean-burn compression-ignited ones (Diesel cycle).

=== Use of LNG to fuel large over-the-road trucks ===
LNG is being evaluated and tested for over-the-road trucking, off-road, marine, and railroad applications. There are known problems with the fuel tanks and the delivery of gas to the engine.

China has been a leader in the use of LNG vehicles with over 100,000 LNG powered vehicles on the road as of 2014.

In the United States, there were 69 public truck LNG fuel centers as of February 2015. The 2013 National Trucker's Directory lists approximately 7,000 truck stops, thus approximately 1% of US truck stops have LNG available.

In 2013, Dillon Transport announced they were putting 25 large LNG trucks into service in Dallas, USA. They are refueling at a public LNG fuel center. The same year Raven Transportation announced they were buying 36 LNG large trucks to be fueled by Clean Energy Fuels locations and Lowe's finished converting one of its dedicated fleets to LNG fueled trucks.

UPS had over 1200 LNG fueled trucks on the roads in February 2015. UPS has 16,000 tractor trucks in its fleet, and 60 of the new 2014 large trucks will be placed in service in the Houston, USA area, where UPS is building its own private LNG fuel center to avoid the lines at retail fuel centers. In Amarillo, USA and Oklahoma City, USA, UPS is using public fuel centers.

Clean Energy Fuels has opened several public LNG Fuel Lanes along I-10 and claims that as of June 2014, LNG fueled trucks can use the route from Los Angeles to Houston, USA by refueling exclusively at Clean Energy Fuels public facilities. In 2014 Shell and Travel Centers of America opened the first of a planned network of U.S. truck stop LNG stations in California, USA. Per the alternative fuel fuelling centre tracking site there are 10 LNG capable public fuel stations in the greater Los Angeles area, making it the single most penetrated metro market. As of February 2015, Blu LNG has at least 23 operational LNG capable fuel centers across 8 states, and Clean Energy had 39 operational public LNG facilities.

As can be seen at the alternative fuel fueling center tracking site, as of early 2015 there is a void of LNG fuel centers, public and private, from Illinois to the Rockies. A Noble Energy LNG production plant in northern Colorado was planned to go online in the first quarter of 2015 and to have a capacity of 100,000 gallons of LNG per day for on-road, off-road, and drilling operations.

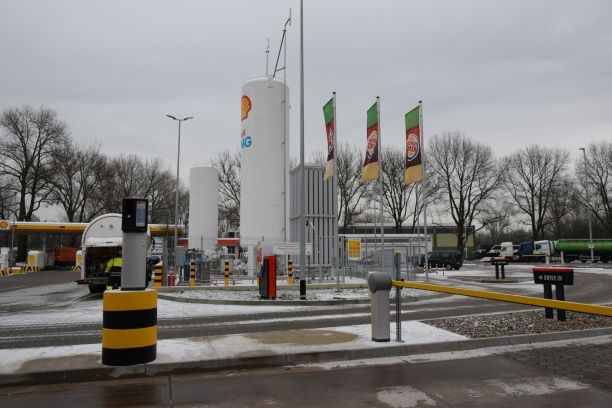
LNG station in Hamburg

As of 2014, LNG fuel and NGVs had not achieved much usage in Europe.

American Gas & Technology pioneered the use of onsite liquefaction using van sized station to access Natural Gas from utility pipe and clean, liquefy, store, and dispense it. Their stations make 1,100–18,900 litres (300–5,000 US gal) of LNG per day.

=== Use of LNG to fuel high-horsepower/high-torque engines ===
In internal combustion engines, the volume of the cylinders is a common measure of the power of an engine. Thus, a 2000cc engine would typically be more powerful than a 1800cc engine, but that assumes a similar air-fuel mixture is used.

If via a turbocharger as an example, the 1800cc engine were using an air-fuel mixture that was significantly more energy dense, then it might be able to produce more power than a 2000cc engine burning a less energy-dense air-fuel mixture. However, turbochargers are both complex and expensive. Thus, it becomes clear that for high-horsepower/high-torque engines, a fuel that can inherently be used to create an energy-dense dense air-fuel mixture is preferred because a smaller and simpler engine can produce the same power.

With traditional gasoline and diesel engines, the energy density of the air-fuel mixture is limited because the liquid fuels do not mix well in the cylinder. Further, gasoline and diesel auto-ignite at temperatures and pressures relevant to engine design. An important part of traditional engine design is designing the cylinders, compression ratios, and fuel injectors such that pre-ignition is avoided, but at the same time as much fuel as possible can be injected, become well mixed, and still have time to complete the combustion process during the power stroke.

Natural gas does not auto-ignite at pressures and temperatures relevant to traditional gasoline and diesel engine design, thus providing more flexibility in the design of a natural gas engine. Methane, the main component of natural gas, has an autoignition temperature of 580 °C, whereas gasoline and diesel autoignite at approximately 250 °C and 210 °C respectively.

With a compressed natural gas (CNG) engine, the mixing of the fuel and the air is more effective since gases typically mix well in a short period of time. Still, at typical CNG compression pressures, the fuel itself is less energy dense than gasoline or diesel thus the result is a lower energy dense air-fuel mixture. Thus for the same cylinder displacement engine, a non-turbocharged CNG-powered engine is typically less powerful than a similarly sized gasoline or diesel engine. For that reason, turbochargers are popular in European CNG cars. Despite that limitation, the 12 litre Cummins Westport ISX12G engine is an example of a CNG capable engine designed to pull tractor/trailer loads up to 36 tonnes (80,000 lb) showing CNG can be used in most if not all on-road truck applications. The original ISX G engines incorporated a turbocharger to enhance the air-fuel energy density.

LNG offers a unique advantage over CNG for more demanding high-horsepower applications by eliminating the need for a turbocharger. Because LNG boils at approximately -160 °C, using a simple heat exchanger, a small amount of LNG can be converted to its gaseous form at extremely high pressure with little or no mechanical energy. A properly designed high-horsepower engine can leverage this high-pressure energy-dense gaseous fuel source to create a higher energy-density air-fuel mixture than can be efficiently created with a CNG-powered engine. Compared to CNG engines, the result is more overall efficiency in high-horsepower engine applications when high-pressure direct injection technology is used. The Westport HDMI2 fuel system is an example of a high-pressure direct injection technology that does not require a turbocharger if teamed with appropriate LNG heat exchanger technology. The Volvo Trucks 13-liter LNG engine is another example of an LNG engine leveraging advanced high-pressure technology.

Westport recommends CNG for engines 7 litres or smaller and LNG with direct injection for engines between 20 and 150 litres. For engines between 7 and 20 litres, either option is recommended. See slide 13 from their NGV BRUXELLES – INDUSTRY INNOVATION SESSION presentation

High horsepower engines in the oil drilling, mining, locomotive, and marine fields have been or are being developed. Paul Blomerus has written a paper concluding as much as 40 million tonnes per annum of LNG could be required to meet the global needs of the high-horsepower engines by 2025 to 2030.

As of the end of the first quarter of 2015, Prometheus Energy Group Inc claims to have delivered over 100 million gallons (380 million litres) of LNG within the previous four years into the industrial market, and is continuing to add new customers.

=== Motorcycles ===
Scooters can also use CNG as a fuel source.

=== Ships ===
The MV Isla Bella was the world's first LNG powered container ship. LNG carriers are sometimes powered by the boil-off of LNG from their storage tanks, although Diesel powered LNG carriers are also common to minimize loss of cargo and enable more versatile refueling.

=== Aircraft ===
Some airplanes use LNG to power their turbofans. Aircraft are susceptible to weight; much of an aircraft's weight goes into fuel carriage. Liquified natural gas has a high specific energy (MJ/kg), a useful optimization for flight applications.

== Chemical composition and energy content ==
=== Chemical composition ===
The primary component of natural gas is methane (CH_{4}), the shortest and lightest hydrocarbon molecule. It may also contain heavier gaseous hydrocarbons such as ethane (C_{2}H_{6}), propane (C_{3}H_{8}) and butane (C_{4}H_{10}), as well as other gases, in varying amounts. Hydrogen sulfide (H_{2}S - acid gas) is a common contaminant, which must be removed prior to most uses.

=== Energy content ===
Combustion of one cubic meter yields 38 MJ (10.6 kWh). Natural gas has the highest energy/carbon ratio of any fossil fuel and thus produces less carbon dioxide per unit of energy.

== Storage and transport ==
=== Transport ===
The major difficulty in the use of natural gas is transportation. Natural gas pipelines are economical and common on land and across medium-length stretches of water (like Langeled, Interconnector and Trans-Mediterranean Pipeline), but are impractical across large oceans. Liquefied natural gas (LNG) tanker ships, railway tankers, and tank trucks are also used.

=== Storage ===
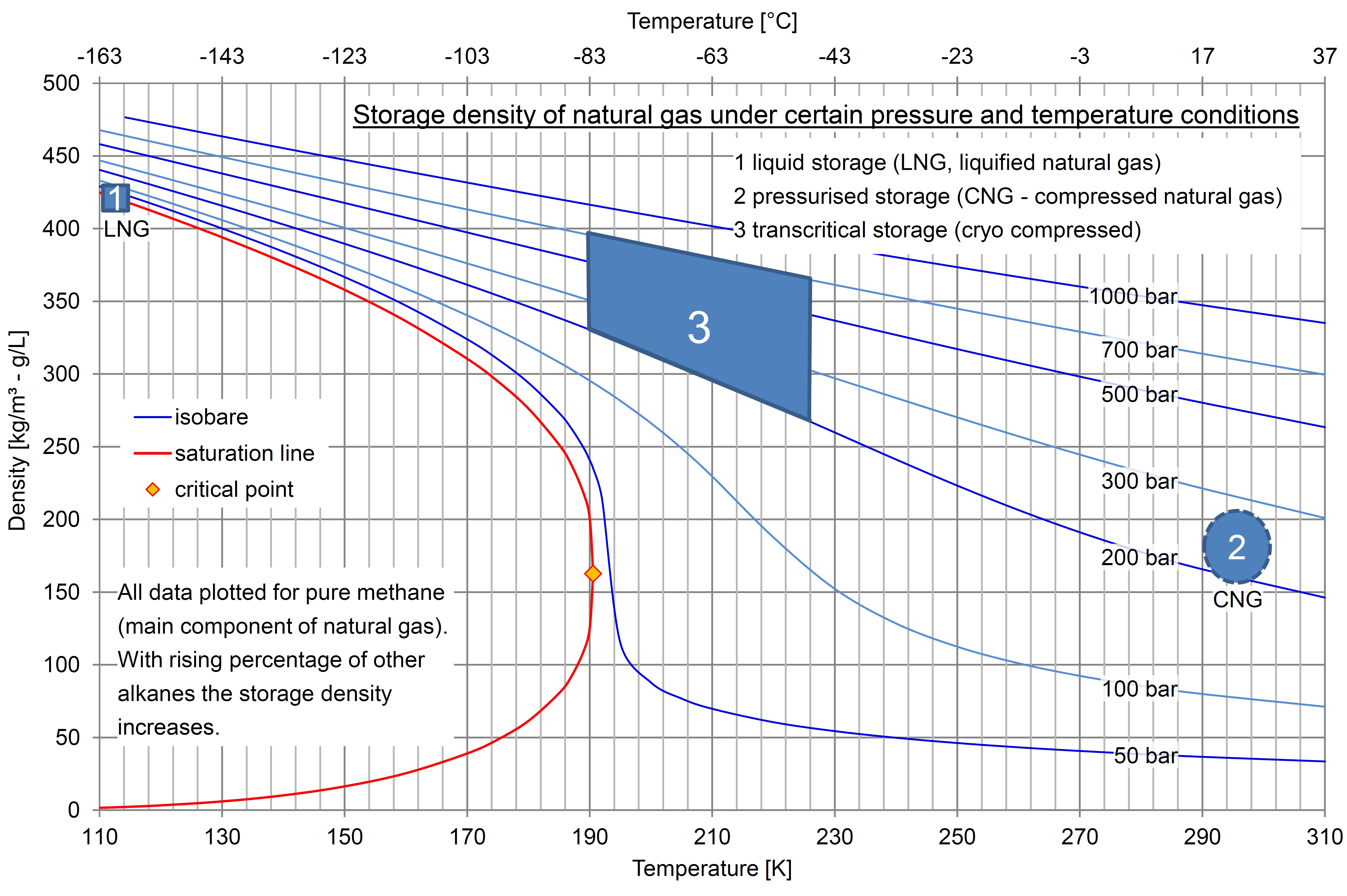
storage density of natural gas

CNG is typically stored in steel or composite containers at high pressure (205 to 275 bars (2,970 to 3,990 psi)). These containers are not typically temperature controlled but are allowed to stay at local ambient temperature. There are many standards for CNG cylinders. The most popular one is ISO 11439. For North America the standard is ANSI NGV-2.

LNG storage pressures are typically around 3 to 10 bar. At atmospheric pressure, LNG is at a temperature of -162 °C. However, in a vehicle tank under pressure, the temperature is slightly higher (see saturated fluid). Storage temperatures may vary due to varying composition and storage pressure. LNG is far denser than even the highly compressed state of CNG. As a consequence of the low temperatures, vacuum-insulated storage tanks typically made of stainless steel are used to hold LNG.

CNG can be stored at lower pressure in a form known as an ANG (adsorbed natural gas) tank at 35 bar (500 psi, the pressure of gas in natural gas pipelines) in various sponge-like materials, such as activated carbon and metal-organic frameworks (MOFs). The fuel is stored at similar or greater energy density than CNG. This means that vehicles can be refuelled from the natural gas network without extra gas compression, and the fuel tanks can be slimmed down and made of lighter, less strong materials.

=== Conversion kits ===
Conversion kits for gasoline or diesel to LNG/CNG are available in many countries, along with the labor to install them. However, the range of prices and quality of conversion vary enormously.

Recently, regulations involving certification of installations in the USA have been loosened to include certified private companies, those same kit installations for CNG have fallen to the $6,000+ range (depending on the type of vehicle).

== Implementation ==
Top ten countries with the largest NGV vehicle fleets - 2017 (millions)
Rank	Country	Registered fleet	Rank	Country	Registered fleet
1	China	5.000	6	Brazil	1.781
2	Iran	4.000	7	Italy	1.001
3	India	3.045	8	Colombia	0.556
4	Pakistan	3.000	9	Thailand	0.474
5	Argentina	2.295	10	Uzbekistan	0.450
World Total=24.452 million NGV vehicles

=== Overview ===
Natural gas vehicles are popular in regions or countries where natural gas is abundant and where the government chooses to price CNG lower than gasoline. The use of natural gas began in the Po River Valley of Italy in the 1930s, followed by New Zealand in the 1980s, though its use has declined there. At the peak of New Zealand's natural gas use, 10% of the nation's cars were converted, around 110,000 vehicles. In the United States CNG powered buses are the favorite choice of several public transit agencies, with a fleet of more than 114,000 vehicles, mostly buses. India, Australia, Argentina, and Germany also have widespread use of natural gas-powered buses in their public transportation fleets.

=== Europe ===
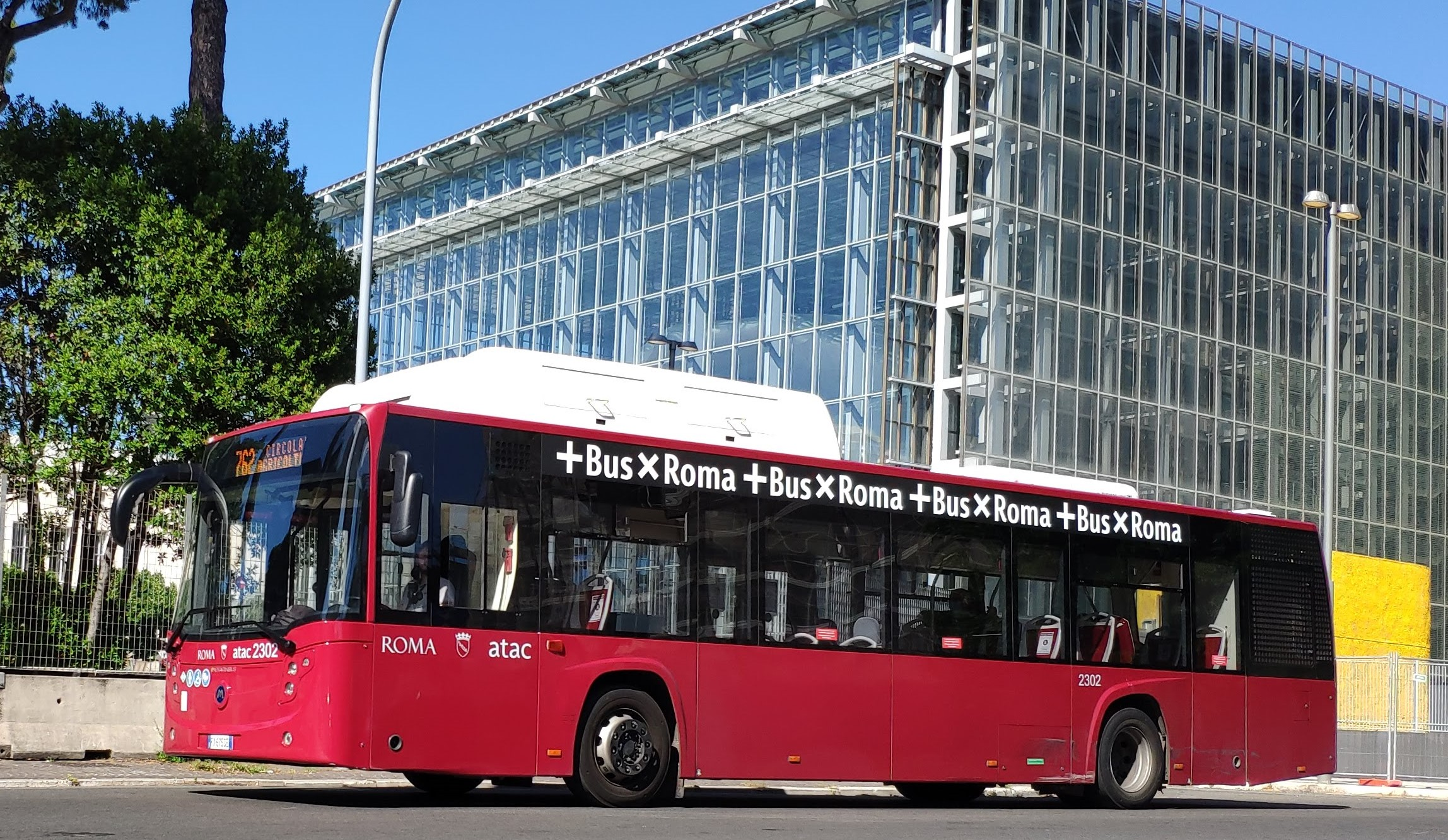
CNG-powered bus in Rome, Italy with gas tank container visible on the roof

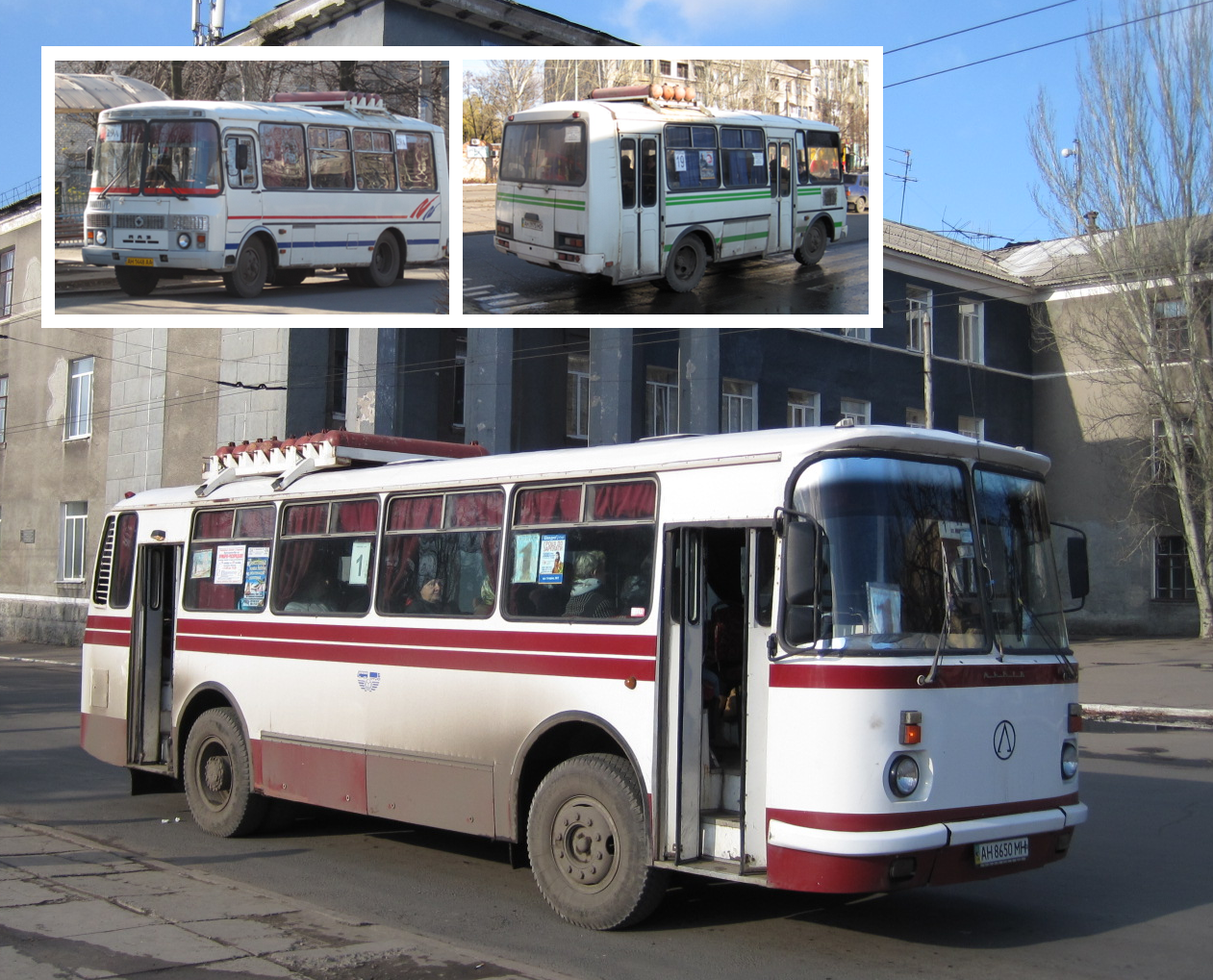
CNG-powered buses in Horlivka, eastern Ukraine

==== Germany ====
As of December 2011, Germany has 900 CNG filling stations in service. Gibgas, an independent consumer group, estimates that 21% of all CNG filling stations in the country offer a natural gas/biomethane mix to varying ratios, and 38 stations offer pure biomethane.

==== Greece ====
Greece uses natural gas buses for public transport in Athens. Also, the Public Gas Company (DEPA) has a network of 14 stations (as of June 2020), under brand "Fisikon", with expansion plans.

==== Ireland ====
Bus Éireann Introduced the first NGV on 17 July 2012. It will operate on the 216 city centre to Mount Oval, Rochestown, route until mid-August on trial being undertaken in partnership with Ervia. The Eco-city bus is made by MAN.

==== Italy ====
Natural gas traction is quite popular in Italy, due to the existence of a capillary distribution network for industrial use since the late 50s and a traditionally high retail price for petrol. As of April 2012 there were about 1500 filling stations, spread on the entire country except for the island of Sardinia, while the fleet reached 730,000 CNG vehicles at the end of 2010.

==== Ukraine ====
Ukraine's first compressed natural gas refueling station (CNGS) was commissioned in 1937. Today, there is a well-developed CNGS network across the country. Many buses were converted to run on CNG during the 1990s, primarily for economic reasons. The retrofitted cylinders are often visible atop the vehicle's roof and/or underneath the body. Despite their age, these buses remain in service and continue to provide reliable public transport combined with the environmental benefits of CNG.

==== United Kingdom ====
CNG buses are beginning to be used in the UK, e.g. by Reading Buses and Nottingham City Transport. The latter company purchased 53 double-decker gas buses between 2017 and 2018, earning them the world record for the largest fleet of CNG buses in the world. In 2019, Nottingham City Transport purchased a further 67 CNG buses.

=== North America ===
==== Canada ====
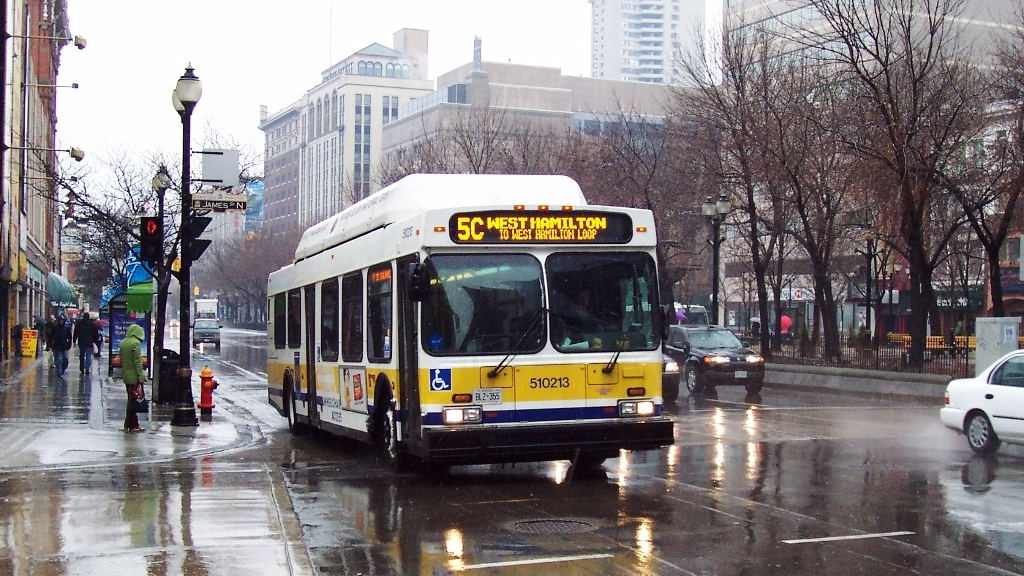
New Flyer C40LF in Hamilton, Ontario

Natural Gas has been used as a motor fuel in Canada for over 20 years. With assistance from federal and provincial research programs, demonstration projects, and NGV market deployment programs during the 1980s and 1990s, the population of light-duty NGVs grew to over 35,000 by the early 1990s. This assistance resulted in a significant adoption of natural gas transit buses as well. The NGV market started to decline after 1995, eventually reaching today's vehicle population of about 12,000.

This figure includes 150 urban transit buses, 45 school buses, 9,450 light-duty cars and trucks, and 2,400 forklifts and ice-resurfacers. The total fuel use in all NGV markets in Canada was 1.9 petajoules (PJs) in 2007 (or 54.6 million liters of gasoline liters equivalent), down from 2.6 PJs in 1997. Public CNG refueling stations have declined in numbers from 134 in 1997 to 72 today. There are 22 in British Columbia, 12 in Alberta, 10 in Saskatchewan, 27 in Ontario, and 1 in Québec. There are only 12 private fleet stations.

==== United States ====
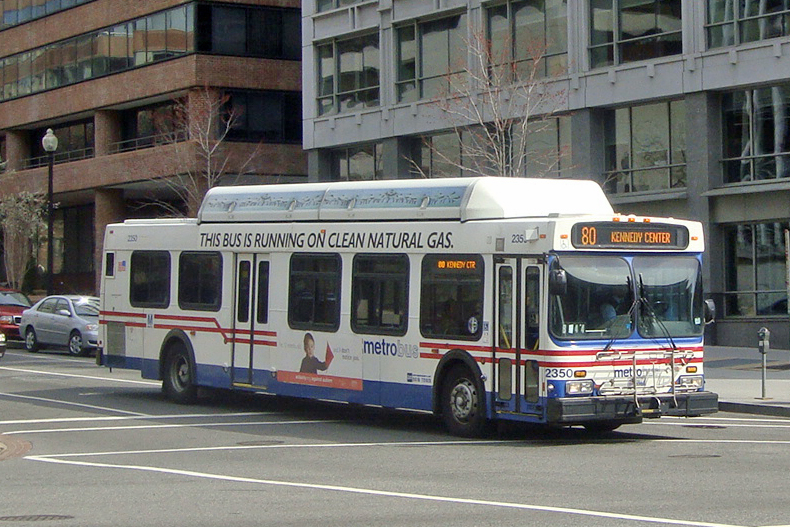
New Flyer C40LF in Washington, DC

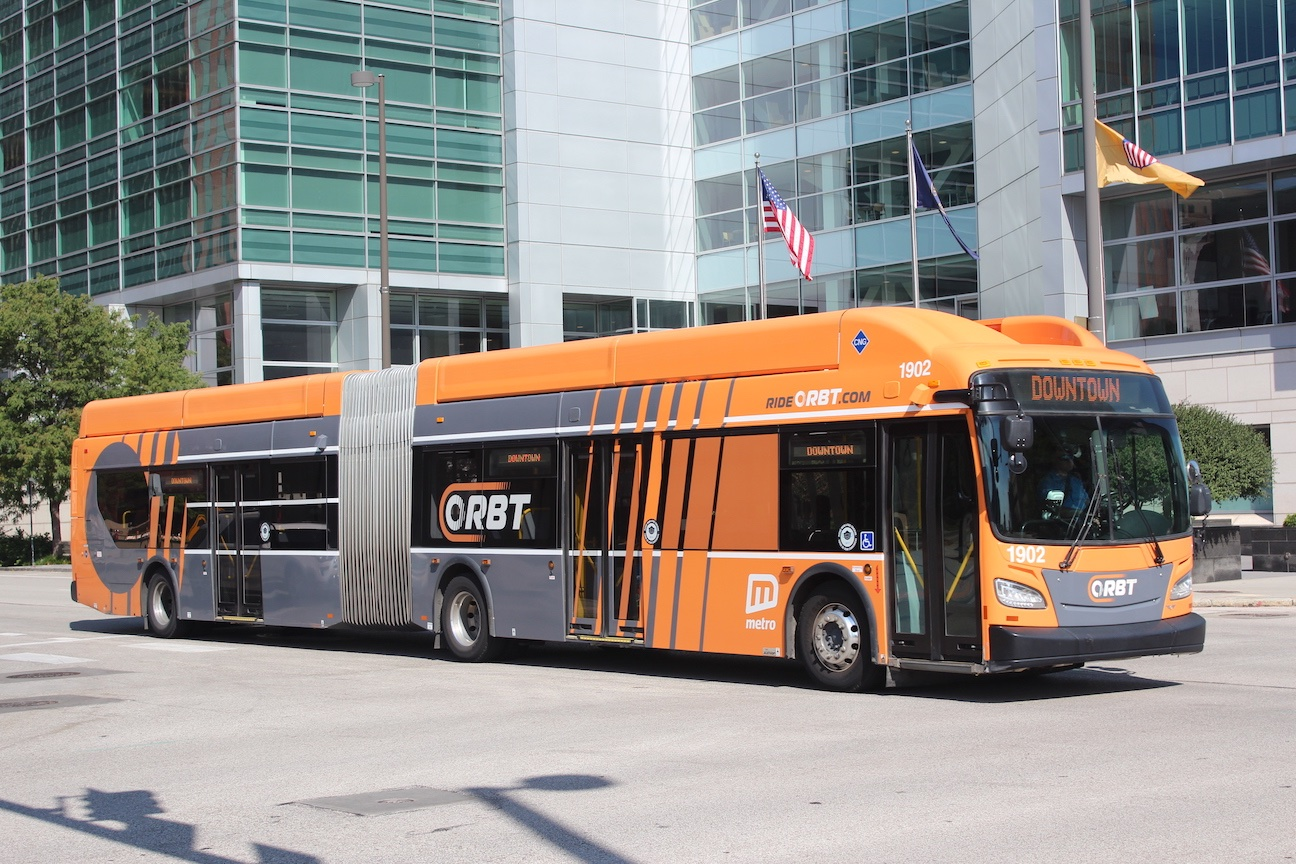
New Flyer XN60 in Omaha, Nebraska

As of December 2009, the U.S. had a fleet of 114,270 compressed natural gas (CNG) vehicles, 147,030 vehicles running on liquefied petroleum gas (LPG), and 3,176 vehicles running on liquefied natural gas (LNG). The NGV fleet is made up mostly of transit buses, but there are also some government fleet cars and vans, as well as an increasing number of corporate trucks replacing diesel versions, most notably Waste Management, Inc and UPS trucks. As of 12-Dec-2013, Waste Management has a fleet of 2000 CNG Collection trucks; as of 12-Dec-2013, UPS has 2700 alternative fuel vehicles. As of February 2011, there were 873 CNG refueling sites, 2,589 LPG sites, and 40 LNG sites, led by California with 215 CNG refueling stations in operation, 228 LPG sites and 32 LNG sites. The number of refueling stations includes public and private sites; not all are available to the public. As of December 2010, the U.S. ranked sixth in the world in terms of number of NGV stations. Currently, there are 160,000 NGVs operating in the country.

==== Mexico ====
The natural gas vehicle market is limited to fleet vehicles and other public use vehicles like minibuses in larger cities. However, the state-owned bus company RTP Of Mexico City has purchased 30 Hyundai Super Aero City CNG-Propelled buses to integrate with the existing fleet as well as to introduce new routes within the city.

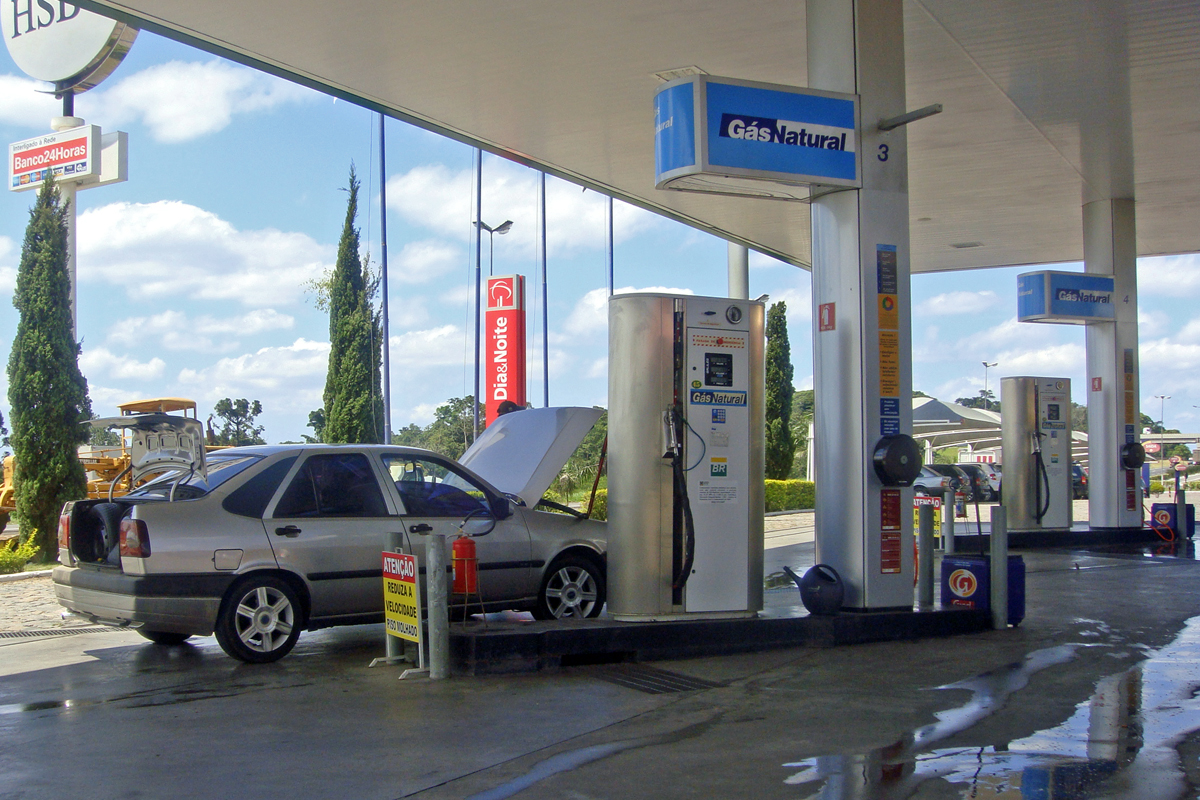
CNG pumps at a Brazilian gasoline service station, Paraná state

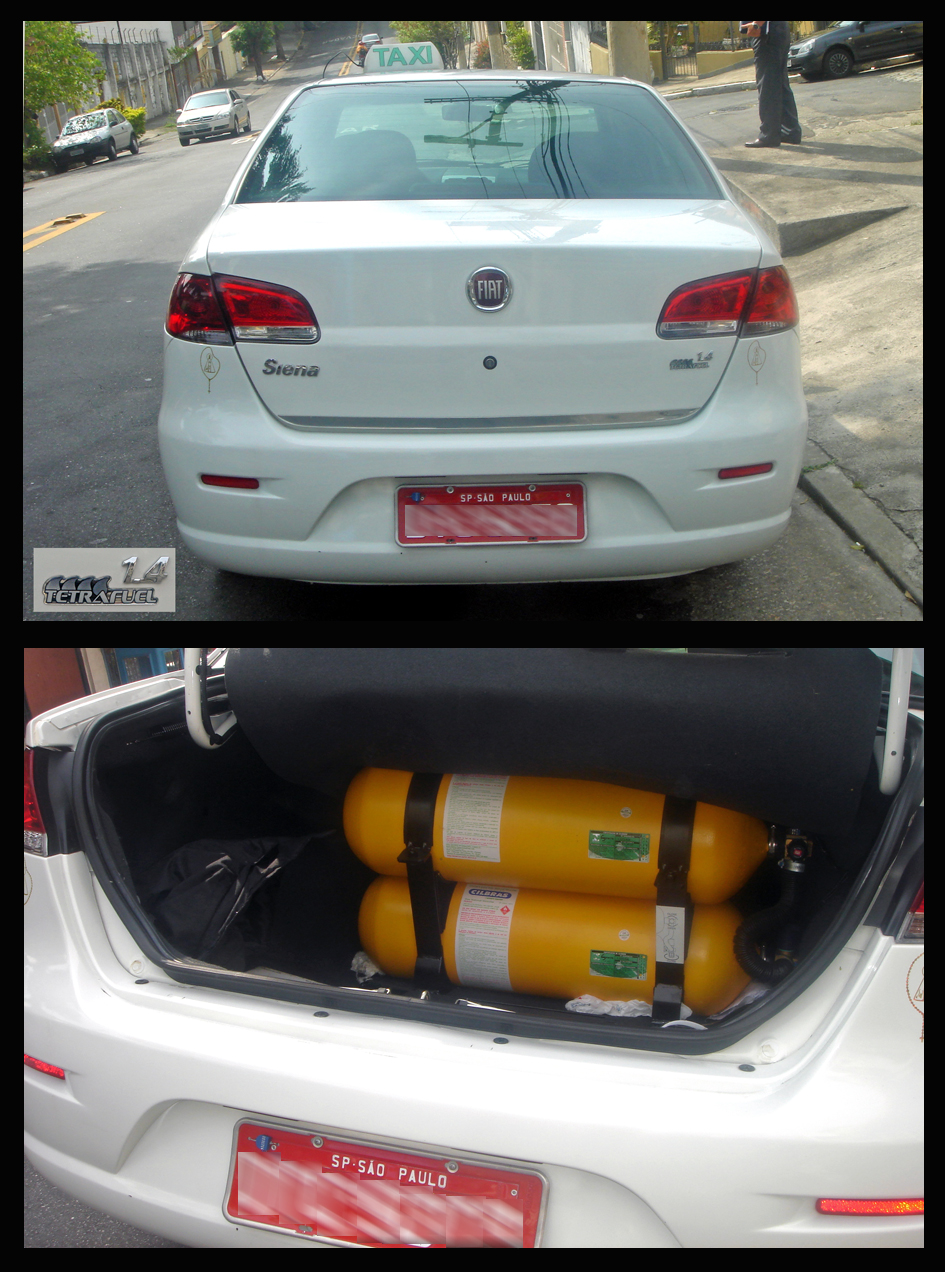
Popular among taxi drivers, the Brazilian Fiat Siena Tetrafuel 1.4, is a multifuel car that runs as a flexible-fuel on pure gasoline, or E20-E25 blend, or pure ethanol (E100); or runs as a bi-fuel with CNG. Below: the CNG storage tanks in the trunk

=== South America ===
==== Overview ====
CNG vehicles are common in South America, with a 35% share of the worldwide NGV fleet, where these vehicles are mainly used as taxicabs in main cities of Argentina and Brazil. Normally, standard gasoline vehicles are retrofitted in specialized shops, which involve installing the gas cylinder in the trunk, the CNG injection system, and electronics.

As of 2009 Argentina had 1,807,186 NGVs with 1,851 refueling stations across the nation, or 15% of all vehicles; and Brazil had 1,632,101 vehicles and 1,704 refueling stations, with a higher concentration in the cities of Rio de Janeiro and São Paulo.

Colombia had an NGV fleet of 300,000 vehicles, and 460 refueling stations as of 2009. Bolivia has increased its fleet from 10,000 in 2003 to 121,908 units in 2009, with 128 refueling stations.

Peru had 81,024 NGVs and 94 fueling stations as 2009,. In Peru, several factory-built CNVs have tanks installed under the vehicle's body, leaving the trunk free. Among the models built with this feature are the Fiat Multipla, the new Fiat Panda, the Volkswagen Touran Ecofuel, the Volkswagen Caddy Ecofuel, and the Chevy Taxi. Right now, Peru has 224,035 NGVs.

Other countries with significant NGV fleets are Venezuela (226,100) as of 2017 and Chile (15,000) as of 2017.

==== Latest developments ====
GM do Brasil introduced the MultiPower engine in August 2004 which was capable of using CNG, alcohol and gasoline as fuel. The GM engine has electronic fuel injection that automatically adjusts to any acceptable fuel configuration. This motor was used in the Chevrolet Astra and was aimed at the taxi market.

In 2006 the Brazilian subsidiary of Fiat introduced the Fiat Siena Tetra fuel, a four-fuel car developed under Magneti Marelli of Fiat Brazil. This automobile can run on 100% ethanol (E100), E20 to E25 blend (Brazil's normal ethanol gasoline blend), pure gasoline (not available in Brazil), and natural gas, and switches from the gasoline-ethanol blend to CNG automatically, depending on the power required by road conditions.

Since 2003 and with the commercial success of flex cars in Brazil, another existing option is to retrofit an ethanol flexible-fuel vehicle to add a natural gas tank and the corresponding injection system. Some taxicabs in São Paulo and Rio de Janeiro, Brazil, run on this option, allowing the user to choose among three fuels (E25, E100 and CNG) according to the current market prices at the pump. Vehicles with this adaptation are known in Brazil as tri-fuel cars.

=== South Asia ===
==== India ====
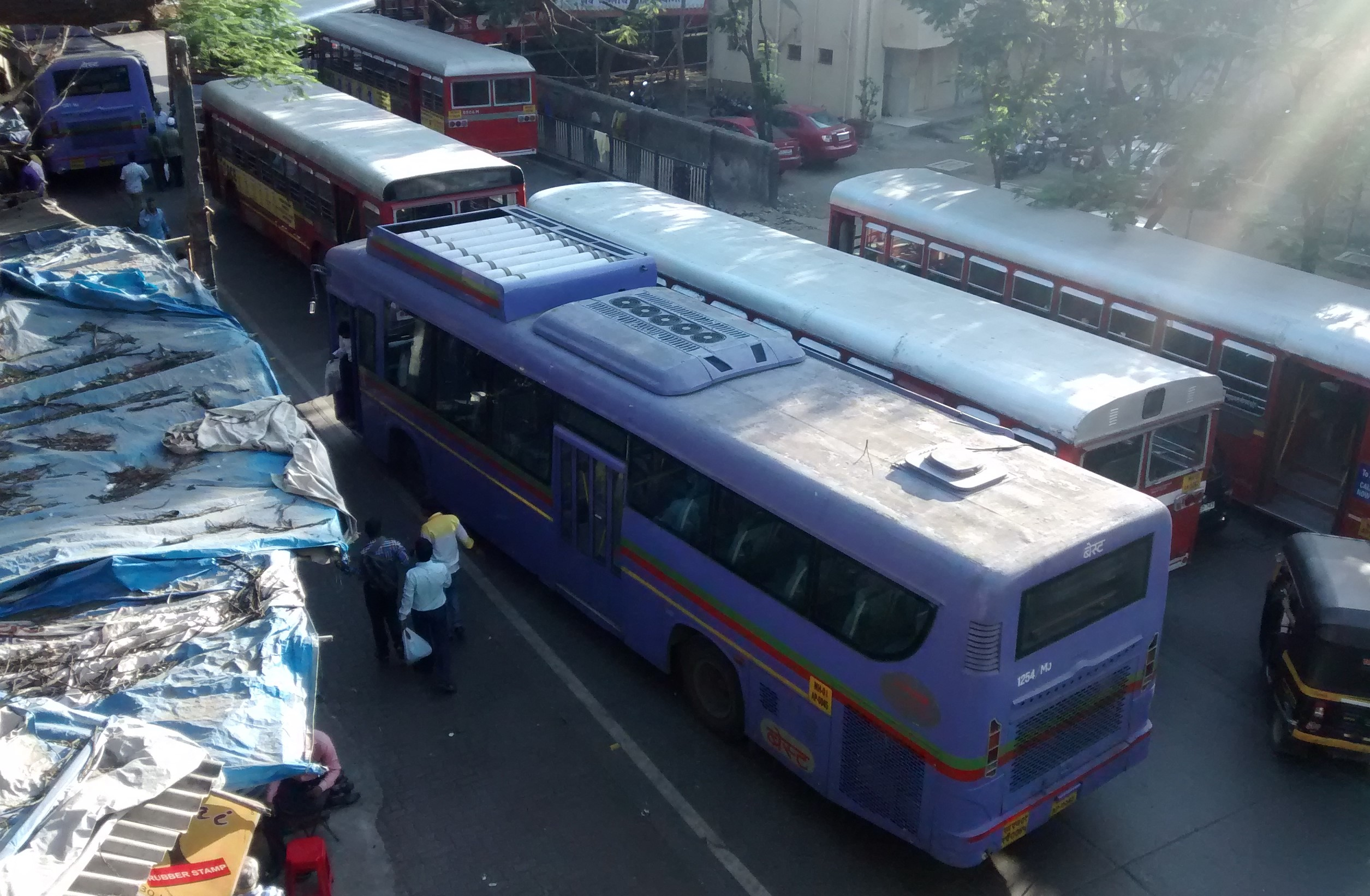
CNG tanks atop a BEST Bus in Mumbai

In 1993, CNG had become available in Delhi, India's capital, though LPG became predominantly used due to its lower capital costs. Compressed Natural Gas is a domestic energy produced in Western parts of India. In India, most CNG vehicles are dual-fuelled, which means they can run both on CNG and petrol. This makes it very convenient, and users can drive long distances without worrying about the availability of natural gas (as long as petrol is available). As of December 2010, India had 1,080,000 NGVs and 560 fueling stations, many of the older ones being LPG rather than CNG. In addition, it is thought that more illegally converted LPG autos than legal ones ply the streets in India, some estimates are as high as 15 million "autos" (running the gamut of everything from LPG motored pedal bicycles to CNG buses)

In 1995, a lawyer filed a case with the Supreme Court of India under the Public Interest Litigation rule, which is part of the Constitution of India and enables any citizen to address the Supreme Court directly. The lawyer's case was about the health risks caused by air pollution emitted from road vehicles. The Supreme Court decided that cars in circulation after 1995 would have to run on unleaded fuel. By 1998, India was converted to 100% of unleaded fuel after the government ruled that diesel cars in India were restricted to 10,000 ppm after 1995. At the beginning of 2005, 10,300 CNG busses, 55,000 CNG three-wheeler taxis, 5,000 CNG minibuses, 10,000 CNG taxis and 10,000 CNG cars ran on India's roads (1982-2008 Product-Life Institute, Geneva). The Delhi Transport Corporation currently operates the world's largest fleet of CNG buses for public transport. Currently India stands third with 3.045 million NGVs.

==== Iran ====
By the end of 2015, Iran had the world's largest fleet of NGV at 3.5 million vehicles. The share of compressed natural gas in the national fuel basket is more than 23%. CNG consumption by Iran's transportation sector is around 20 million cubic meters per day. There are 2,335 CNG stations. The growth of NGV market in Iran has in large part been due to Iranian government intervention to decrease the society's dependence on gasoline. This governmental plan was implemented to reduce the effect of sanctions on Iran and make the nation's domestic market less dependent on imported gasoline. Iran has been manufacturing its own NGVs through local manufacturing using dedicated CNG engines which use gasoline only as a backup fuel. Also by 2012, Iranian manufacturers had the capacity to build 1.5 million CNG cylinders per year and therefore Iranian government has banned their imports to support the local manufacturers. In addition CNG in Iran costs the least compared to the rest of the world. In 2012, the Iranian government announced a plan to replace the traditional CNG cylinders with adsorbed natural gas (ANG) cylinders.

==== Pakistan ====
Pakistan was the country with the second largest fleet of NGV with a total of 2.85 million by the end of 2011. Most of the public transportation fleet has been converted to CNG. Also, in Pakistan and India, there have been on-going (last several years now) series of CNG fuel shortages which periodically waxes and wanes, getting the fuel into a tank can be a major problem. In July 2011, petrol usage shot up 15% from the month before due to shortages. Pakistan also has reported that over 2,000 people have died in 2011 from CNG cylinder blasts, because of low quality of cylinders there. In 2012, the Pakistani government decided to gradually phase out the CNG sector, beginning by banning any new conversions to CNG and banning the manufacturing of new NGVs. In addition, the government plans to close down all refueling stations in the next three years.

=== Southeast Asia ===
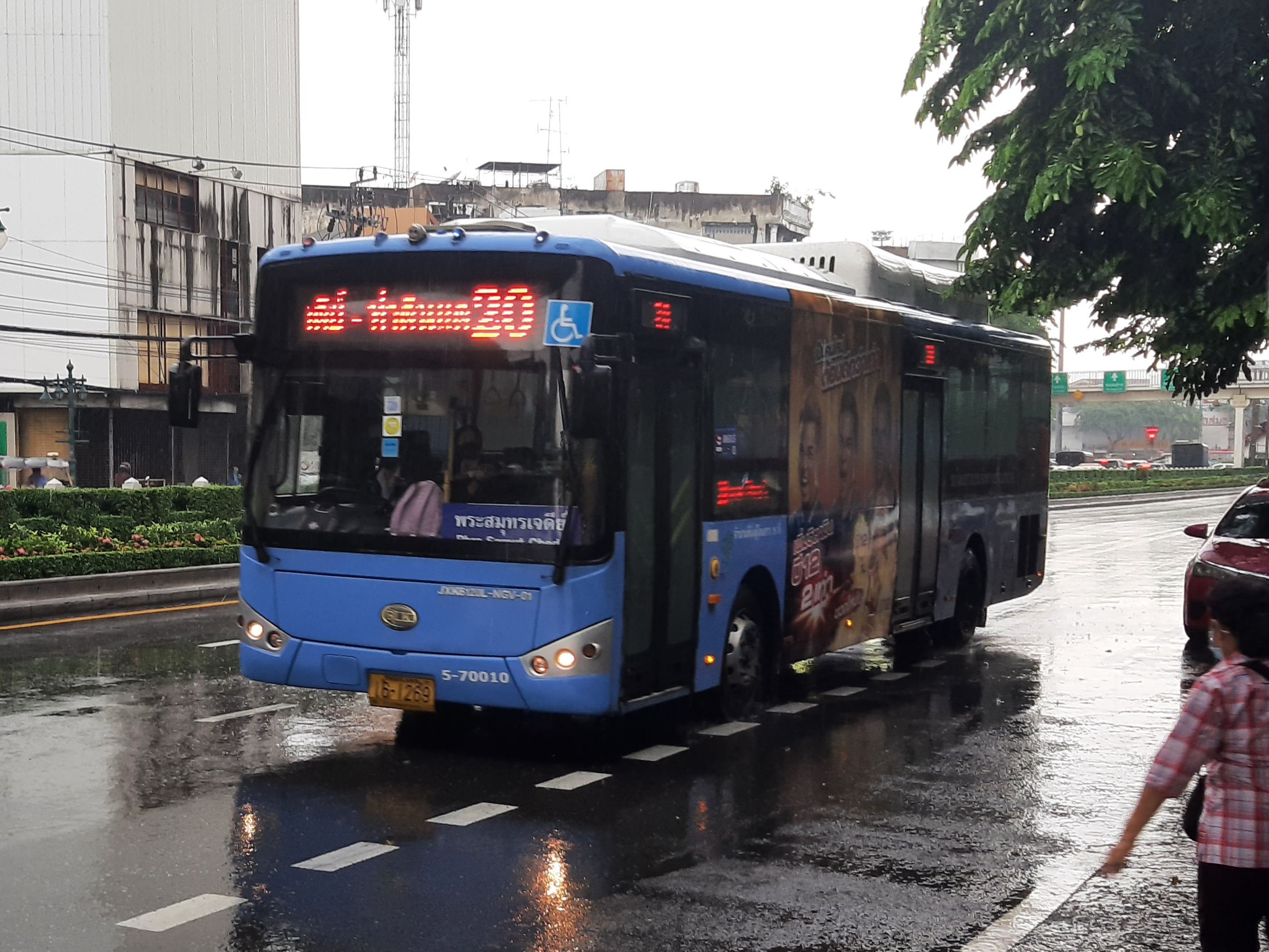
A CNG powered Bonluck JXK6120L-NGV-01 bus, operated by BMTA in Thailand

==== Thailand ====
Thailand has for over a 15 years run autogas taxi cabs in Bangkok, though autos and buses had erroneously labelled NGV stickers on them, when in fact, were LPG fuelled.

Given a generous natural gas supply but relying on imported oil, the Thailand government heavily promoted alternative fuels like LPG, natural gas and ethanol to replace gasoline beginning around 2003. Yet, NGV was very slow to take off due to cheaper LPG fuel, a pre-existing LPG fleet, and the low conversion cost of local LPG conversion shops compared to factory-installed CNG or conversion. A significant effort was made when the state-controlled oil company PTT PCL built a network of natural gas refueling stations. The cost of subsidy was estimated at US$150 million in 2008.

As the price of oil climbed rapidly, it was estimated more than 40,000 new cars and trucks powered by natural gas were purchased in six months in 2008, including many buses. That year, about half of the taxi fleet in Bangkok used LPG and was prodded to convert to CNG, with little success. Since 2008, there has been government arm-twisting to switch from LPG to CNG, with a rollout of CNG stations near Bangkok around 2007 and then upcountry in 2010, at times replacing LPG stations. Operators of used vehicles have balked at the massive conversion cost (up to quadruple that of LPG in Thailand), especially given Thailand's strong ultra-competitive domestic LPG conversion industry and retail CNG fuel cost (one and a half times). Thailand had some 700,000 LPG-fueled vehicles and 300,000 CNG fueled, with 1,000 LPG stations and 600 CNG as of 2011. Demand has increased 26% over 2011 for CNG in Thailand. As of the end of 2012, Thailand has 1,014,000 LPG fueled vehicles, and consumed 606,000 tonnes in 2012 of LPG, while 483 stations serve up some 380,000 CNG vehicles., showing that LPG conversion continues to enjoy heavy favor over NGVs despite a massive government push for CNG. CNG vehicles are more likely to be bought factory installed, while LPG is likely to be an aftermarket conversion. LNG vehicles in Thailand are almost non-existent except for lorries.

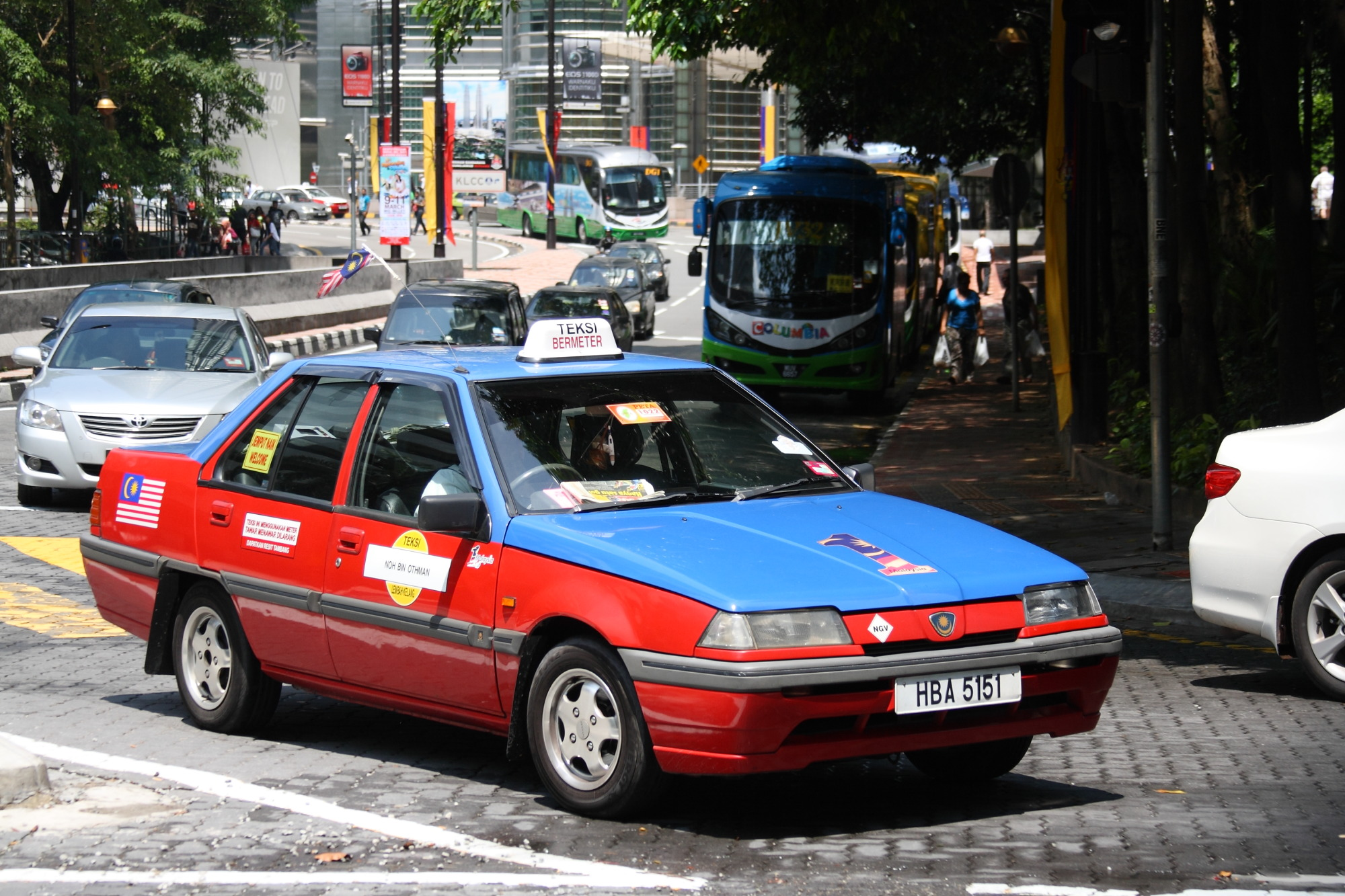
NGV Proton Iswara taxi in Malaysia

==== Malaysia ====
In Malaysia, the use of compressed natural gas was originally introduced for taxicabs and airport limousines during the late 1990s, when new taxis were launched with NGV engines while taxicab operators were encouraged to send in existing taxis for full engine conversions, reducing their costs of operation. Any vehicle converted to use CNG is labelled with white rhombus "NGV" (Natural Gas Vehicle) tags, lending to the common use of "NGV" when referring to road vehicles with CNG engines. The practice of using CNG remained largely confined to taxicabs predominantly in the Klang Valley and Penang due to a lack of interest. No incentives were offered for those besides taxicab owners to use CNG engines. At the same time, government subsidies on petrol and diesel made conventional road vehicles cheaper to use in the eyes of the consumers. Petronas, Malaysia's state-owned oil company, also monopolizes the provision of CNG to road users. As of July 2008, Petronas only operates about 150 CNG refueling stations, most of which are concentrated in the Klang Valley. At the same time, another 50 was expected by the end of 2008.

As fuel subsidies were gradually removed in Malaysia starting June 5, 2008, the subsequent 41% price hike on petrol and diesel led to a 500% increase in the number of new CNG tanks installed. National car maker Proton considered fitting its Waja, Saga and Persona models with CNG kits from Prins Autogassystemen by the end of 2008, while a local distributor of locally assembled Hyundai cars offers new models with CNG kits. Conversion centres, which also benefited from the rush for lower running costs, also perform partial conversions to existing road vehicles, allowing them to run on both petrol or diesel and CNG with a cost varying between RM3,500 to RM5,000 for passenger cars.

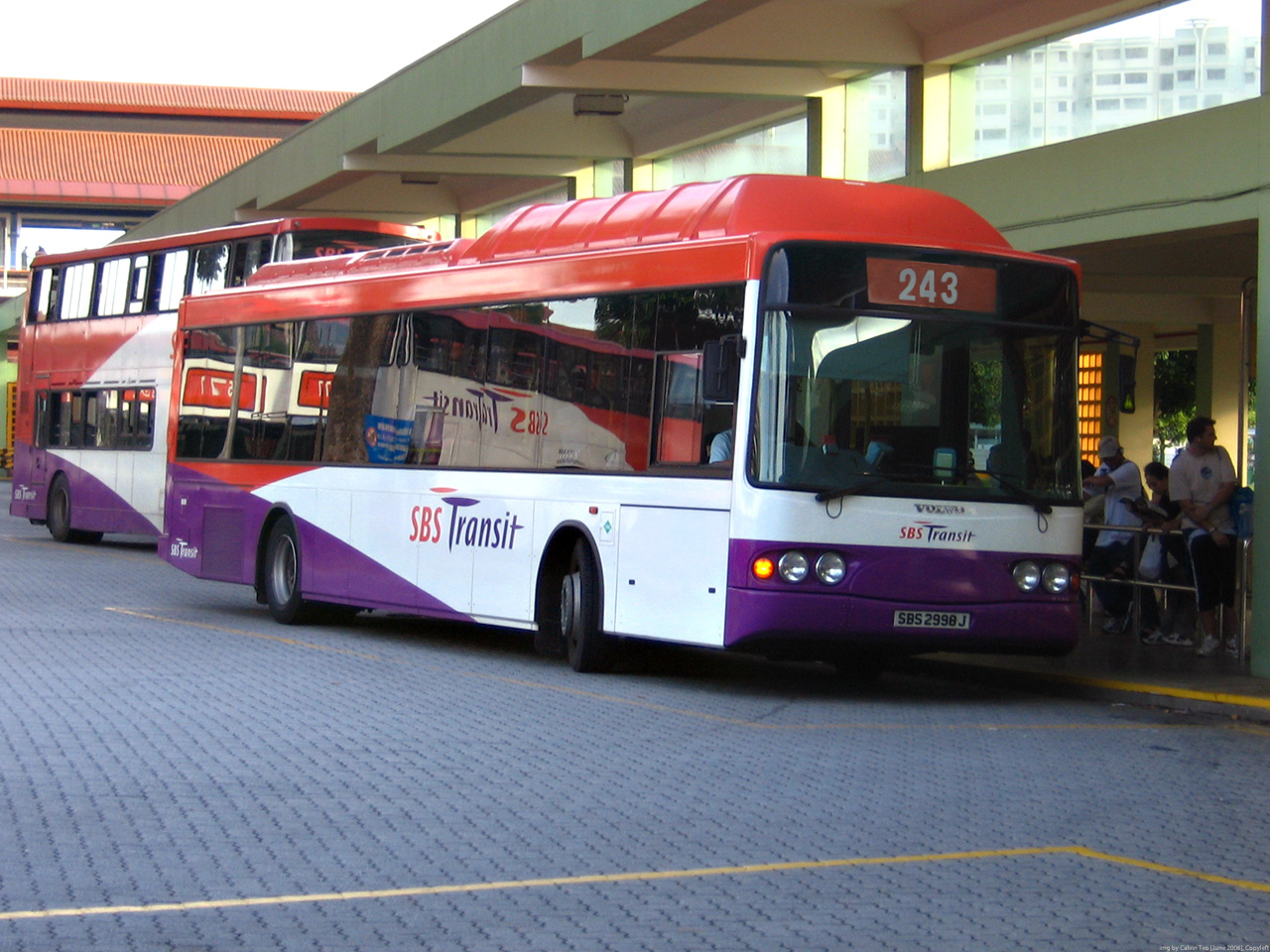
A CNG powered Volvo B10BLE bus, operated by SBS Transit in Singapore

==== Singapore ====
There were about 400 CNG-fueled vehicles in Singapore in mid-2007, of which about 110 are taxis operated by Smart Automobile. By February 2008, the number has risen to 520 CNG vehicles, of which about half are taxis. All vehicles had to refuel at the sole CNG station operated by Sembcorp Gas and located on Jurong Island until the opening of the first publicly accessible CNG station at Mandai in 2008, operated by Smart Automobile. The company plans to build another four stations by 2011, by which time the company projects to operate 3,000 to 4,000 CNG taxis, and with 10,000 CNG public and commercial vehicles of other types on Singapore's roads. Sembcorp Gas opened its second CNG station a week after the Mandai station at Jalan Buroh.

==== Indonesia ====
CNG is almost unheard of as a transport fuel before 2010 in the archipelago except in Jakarta, where a very relatively minor number of vehicles, most notably Transjakarta buses, use the fuel. However, since 2010, the government has emphasised using CNG for vehicle fuel and domestic consumption over wood burning (which can produce deadly methanol) and kerosene.

=== East Asia ===
==== China ====
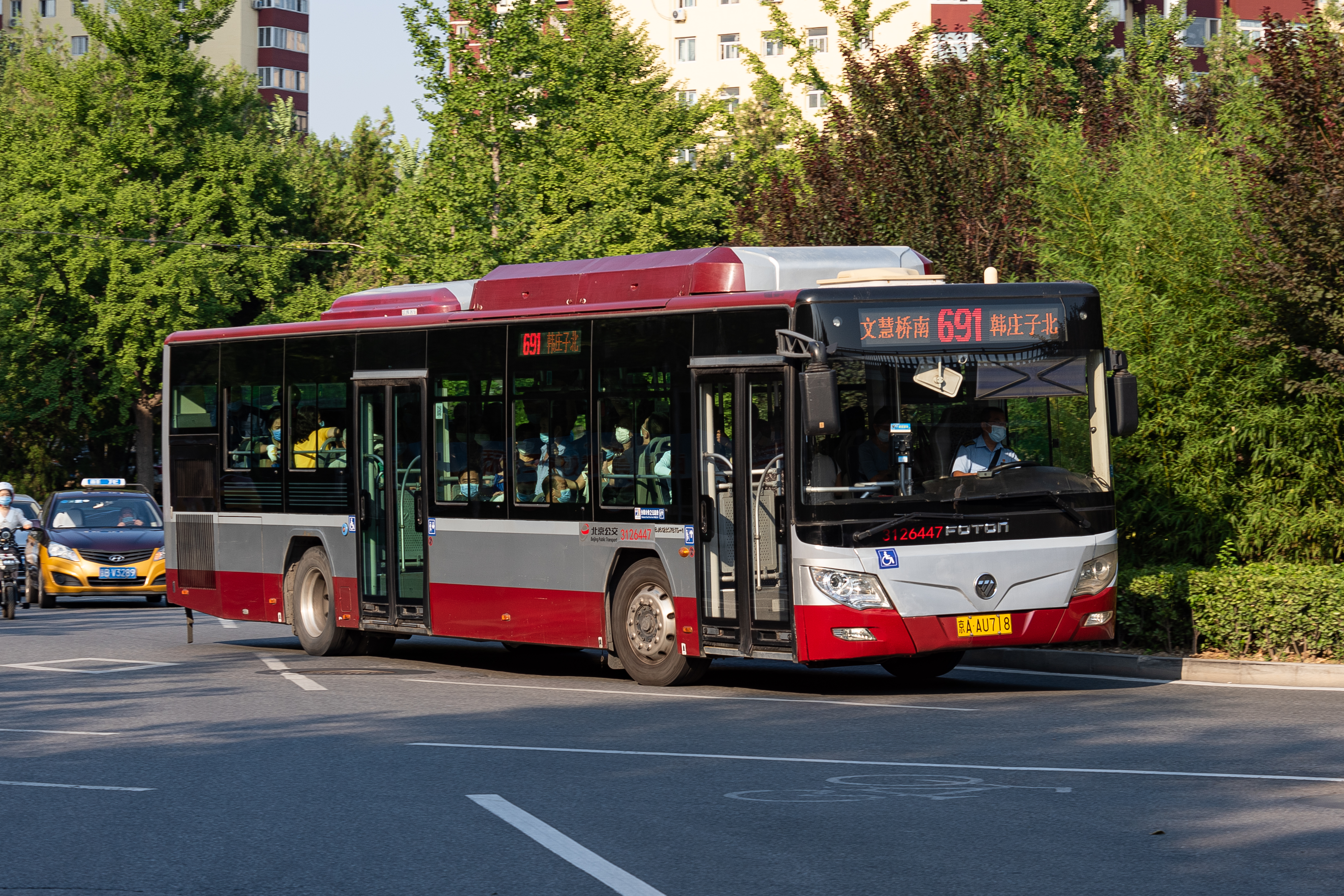
A CNG-powered bus in Beijing, China; Beijing Bus started using natural gas vehicles since September 1999

China had 450,000 NGVs and 870 refueling stations as of 2009. China in 2012 had 1 million NGVs on the roads, 3 million forecasts for 2015, and over 2000 stations (CNG and LPG), with plans for 12,000 by 2020. Currently, China leads the World with 5 million NGVs. China also has a lot of vehicles running of Petrol blended with Methanol as M15 and M85.

==== South Korea ====
For the purpose of improving air quality in the metropolitan area of Seoul, CNG buses were first introduced in July 1997. By 2014, all Seoul buses were operating on CNG. Hyundai motor developed a CNG hybrid bus with 34.5% more-fuel efficiency and 30% lower pollution compared to CNG buses. As a result, the Seoul city government plans to change to CNG hybrid buses for 2,235 low-bed disabled-friendly CNG buses in Seoul.

CNG buses are operating in other major South Korean cities like Busan, Daegu, Daejeon, Gwangju and Incheon.

==== Motorsport ====
A new category of motorcar racing unites teams which compete with cars powered by natural gas, to demonstrate the effectiveness of natural gas as an alternative fuel. ECOMOTORI (magazine) Racing Team The magazine's team participates in the FIA Alternative Energies Cup and the Italian ACI/CSAI Alternative Energies Championship. In 2012, the team, led by Nicola Ventura, competed with a Fiat 500 Abarth, modified to run on natural gas with a Cavagna/Bigas fuel conversion kit and thus renamed "500 EcoAbarth". The driver is Massimo Liverani while in the role of navigator, alternate Valeria Strada, Alessandro Talmelli and Fulvio Ciervo. On October 14, 2012, at the end of the seventh Ecorally San Marino-Vatican, with three wins and second place (out of four races), the Team also won the Italian CSAI Alternative Energy Pilots and Navigators titles. On 28 October 2012, after having raced in seven European countries, collecting three wins, two second places and additional points, the team won the FIA Alternative Energies Drivers and Constructors world titles. For the first time, a methane-powered car won an FIA world title. In 2013, the team raced in the FIA Alternative Energies Cup and CSAI Championships. The "500 Eco barth" dominated the season, winning five out of five titles. Thanks to the team's work, the Abarth once again won a constructors' title since its last win 46 years ago.

== See also ==
- HCNG dispenser
- Hydrogen internal combustion engine vehicle
- List of natural gas vehicles
