= List of natural gas vehicles =

This is a list of natural gas vehicles.

== Airplanes ==
- Tu-155 only experimental
- Tu-206 a LNG version is available as the Tu-206
- Tu-330 a LNG version is available of this transport/survey/tanker aircraft

== Helicopters ==
- Mil Mi-8 only experimental

== Passenger cars ==
- Audi A5 2,0 TFSI CNG (planned) (unveiled 12/07)
- BMW 3 Series (E36) 316g CNG
- BMW 5 Series (E34) 518g CNG
- Chevrolet Cavalier Bi-Fuel CNG
- Citroën C3 1,4 GNV man.
- Citroën Berlingo Multispace 1,4 GNV (MPV) man.
- Dacia Logan 1,6 K4M CNG
- Fiat Panda Natural Power
- Fiat 500 Natural Power
- Fiat Punto 1,2 60 Natural Power/BiPower
- Fiat Grande Punto 1,4 Natural Power/BiPower
- Fiat Multipla Natural Power/Bipower
- Fiat Marea Bipower
- Fiat Doblò SX 1,6 Natural Power/BiPower
- Fiat Siena Tetrafuel
- Ford Crown Victoria CNG
- Ford Contour Bi-Fuel CNG
- Ford Fusion CNG (CH)
- Ford Focus CNG (CH)
- Ford Focus C-Max CNG
- Ford S-Max CNG (CH)
- Ford Mondeo Sedan/STW CNG (CH)
- Ford Galaxy CNG (CH)
- Ford Tourneo (MPV) CNG
- Ford Kuga CNG (CH)
- Ford Maverick CNG (CH)
- Honda Civic CNG
- Honda Civic GX CNG
- Honda CR-V CNG
- Kia Pride (4D) CNG
- Mercedes-Benz B170/B200K NGT (W245) automatic
- Mercedes-Benz C200K T NGT wagon (S207) automatic
- Mercedes-Benz E200K NGT sedan (W211) automatic
- Opel Combo 1,6 CNG Comfort
- Opel Zafira 5D 1,6 CNG Comfort (MPV)
- Opel Astra k 1,4 ecotec CNG
- Peugeot 405 (SD) CNG
- Peugeot 206 (SD) V20 CNG
- Peugeot 207 (3D/5D/SW/CC) VTi CNG (CH)
- Peugeot 308 (3D/5D/SW) VTi CNG (CH)
- Peugeot 405 (4D) CNG
- Peugeot 807 2,0 CNG (CH)
- Peugeot Pars (4D) CNG
- Peugeot Partner 1,4 GNV (MPV) man.
- Proton Saga Iswara 1,3 L (modified)
- Proton Wira 1,3 / 1,5 / 1,6 Auto/Manual BiFuel – EFI Mixer Type (Converted)
- Proton Campro 1,6 BiFuel – EFI – using sequential type (Converted)
- Renault Kangoo 1,6 CNG (MPV)
- Samand (4D) CNG
- Škoda Octavia 1,4 TSI CNG G-Tec
- Škoda Citigo 1,0 CNG
- Suzuki Wagon R CNG/LPG
- Suzuki SX4 CNG
- Toyota Camry CNG
- Volkswagen Golf TGI 1.4 BlueMotion, Natural Gas, 81 kW (110 PS), Cubic Capacity:1395 cm, Fuel capacity (CNG): 15 kg, Fuel capacity (petrol): 50 L, Range (CNG): 420 km, Range (combined): 1360 km
- Volkswagen Caddy/Caddy Maxi Life EcoFuel CNG (MPV) man.
- Volkswagen Touran EcoFuel CNG (MPV) man.
- Volkswagen Passat Sedan/Variant 1,4 TSI EcoFuel CNG (unveiled 12/07) man/aut.(DSG)
- Volkswagen Transporter/Transporter Shuttle/Caravelle/Multivan T4/T5 2,0 I4/3,2 VR6 BiFuel/EcoFuel CNG and TSI EcoFuel CNG (latter planned) (MPV) (also LWB)
- Volkswagen Up! 50 kW (68 PS), Natural Gas, Fuel capacity: 11 kg CNG, Fuel capacity (petrol): 10 L, Range (CNG): 380 km, Range (combined): 600 km
- Volkswagen Transporter 2.0 Natural Gas, 85 kW (115 PS), Cubic Capacity:1.984 cm, Fuel capacity (CNG): 28 kg, Fuel capacity (petrol): 80 L, Range (CNG): 400 km, Range (combined): 1160 km, Fuel consumption combined: 7.3 kg/100 km
- Volvo C30 MultiFuel 1,8F (Gasoline/FFV E85/CNG) (CH)
- Volvo S40 MultiFuel 1.8F (Gasoline/FFV E85/CNG) (CH)
- Volvo V50 MultiFuel 1.8F (Gasoline/FFV E85/CNG) (CH)
- Volvo S60 Bi-Fuel CNG man/aut.
- Volvo V70 Bi-Fuel CNG man/aut.
- Volvo V70 MultiFuel 2.0F / 2.5FT (Gasoline/FFV E85/CNG) (CH)
- Volvo S80 Bi-Fuel CNG man/aut.
- Volvo S80 MultiFuel 2.0F / 2.5FT (Gasoline/FFV E85/CNG) (CH)
  - Cars marked with (CH) available at least in Switzerland (http://www.erdgasfahren.ch/230.html)

== Vans ==
- Chevrolet Express 6.0 V8 bifuel CNG and gasoline cargo and passenger
- Citroën Berlingo 1,4 GNV
- Citroën Jumper GNV
- Dodge Caravan CNG
- Fiat Doblò Cargo BiPower
- Fiat Ducato BiPower
- Ford Transit 2,3 CNG (also LWB)
- GMC Savana 6.0 V8 bi fuel CNG and gasoline cargo and passenger
- Iveco Daily CNG
- Mercedes-Benz Sprinter 316 NGT (also LWB)
- Opel Combo 1,6 CNG Tour
- Peugeot Partner bivalent
- Peugeot Bipper CNG (CH)
- Peugeot Expert CNG (CH)
- Peugeot Boxer bivalent
- Renault Kangoo 1,6 CNG delivery van
- Volkswagen Caddy/Caddy Maxi EcoFuel CNG (a camping car/van version also available as the Caddy Life Tramper EcoFuel CNG)
- Volkswagen Eurovan (Transporter) T4/T5 2,0 I4/3,2 VR6 BiFuel/EcoFuel CNG and TSI EcoFuel CNG (latter planned) (also LWB)

Suzuki Mehran VX CNG BI FUEL Chevy Express Van CNG (Note, limited range ~130 miles/tank)

== Buses ==
- NEFAZ CNG
- Dennis
  - Dart/Dart SPD CNG
- EvoBus (Mercedes-Benz)
  - Citaro/Citaro G/Citaro Ü CNG
  - OG 305
  - O 405 CNG
  - O 405 N/O 405 N²/O 405 NK/O 405 NÜ CNG
  - O 405 GN/O 405 GN² CNG
  - O 405 NH CNG (Australia Only)
  - OC 500 LE 1825 hG modular bus chassis
- Iveco Bus
  - Iveco/Irisbus CityClass CNG
  - Renault/Irisbus Agora/Agora L GNV
  - Irisbus Citelis 12/Citelis 18 GNV
- Isuzu
  - Erga Heavy-duty Bus
  - Erga Mio Medium-Duty Bus
- MAN
  - SL200 CNG
  - SL202 CNG
  - NL202 CNG
  - NL232 CNG
  - NL243 CNG
  - NL313 CNG
  - NG 313 CNG
  - NÜ243 CNG
  - NÜ313 CNG
- Neoplan
  - N 3316 Ü Euroliner
  - N 4007 CNG Centro Midigelenk
  - N 4409 CNG
  - N 4411 CNG Centroliner Solo
  - N 4413/1 CNG, N 4413/2 CNG
  - N 4416 CNG Centroliner Solo
  - N 4420 CNG Centroliner
  - N 4421 CNG Centroliner Gelenk
  - N 4426/3 CNG
- New Flyer
  - CNG
    - C30LF
    - C35LF
    - C40LF
  - LNG
    - L30LF
    - L35LF
    - L40LF
- North American Bus Industries
  - 30 LFW CNG
  - 35 LFW CNG
  - 40 LFW CNG
  - COMPO 45 CNG
  - 42 BRT CNG
  - 60 BRT CNG articulated
- Orion Bus Industries
  - I
  - V
  - VI
  - VII
  - VII Next Generation
- Van Hool
  - A300 CNG
  - A308H CNG
  - A330 CNG
- Volvo
  - Volvo B10L CNG
  - Volvo B10BLE CNG
  - Volvo B9L/B9LA CNG
  - Volvo 7700 CNG

== Trucks ==
- Kamaz CNG
- Chevrolet Silverado CNG
- Ford F-150 Dual Fuel (2001-2004)
- Ford Super Duty
- GMC Sierra CNG
- MAN CNG
- Ram 2500
- Volvo FL
- Mercedes-Benz Econic
- Iveco Stralis CNG
- Scania G-Series CNG

=== Waste collection vehicles ===
- Mercedes-Benz Econic

== Ships ==
- HSC Francisco ferry
- Icon of the Seas and Legend of the Seas cruise ships
- MSC World Europa cruise ship
- Orient Express Corinthian sail cruise ship
- Costa Smeralda cruise ship

== Tanks ==
T-80

== Rocket car ==
- Blue Flame
