= Adsorbed natural gas =

Natural gas storage process

Adsorbed natural gas (ANG) is a process to store natural gas. Natural gas burns cleanly as a fuel, making it useful in many vehicles and applications such as cooking, heating or running generators. It contains mostly methane and ethane. These light gases have very high vapor pressure at ambient temperatures, and their storage requires either high-pressure compression (CNG) or an extreme reduction of temperature (LNG); or adsorbent systems—this is ANG. In the ANG process, natural gas adsorbs to a porous adsorbent at relatively low pressure (100 to 900 psi) and ambient temperature, solving both the high-pressure and low-temperature problems. If a suitable adsorbent is used, it is possible to store more gas in an adsorbent-filled vessel than in an empty vessel at the same pressure. The amount of adsorbed gas depends on pressure, temperature and adsorbent type. Since this adsorption process is exothermic, an increase in pressure or a decrease in temperature enhances the efficiency of the adsorption process.

It is possible to mix the ANG and CNG technology to reach an increased capacity of natural gas storage. In this process known as high pressure ANG, a high pressure CNG tank is filled by absorbers such as activated carbon (which is an adsorbent with high surface area) and stores natural gas by both CNG and ANG mechanisms.

Currently, researchers are developing new adsorbents with higher adsorption ratio to optimize this process, including MOFs (metal-organic frameworks).
