= Mercedes-Benz Sprinter =

Light commercial vehicle

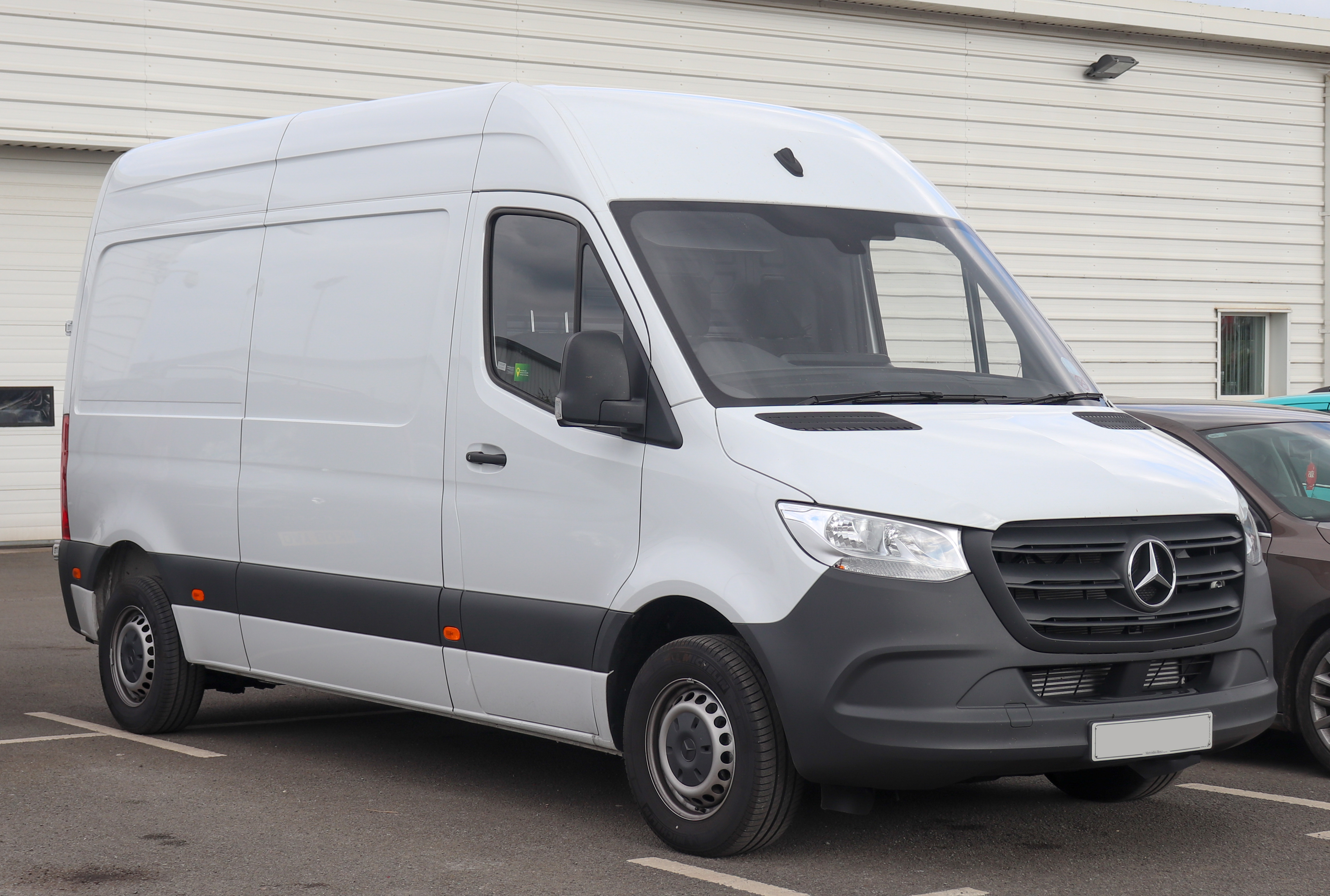
- Mercedes-Benz Sprinter (Third generation)

Overview
- Manufacturer: Daimler-Benz (1995–1998); DaimlerChrysler (1998–2007); Daimler AG (2007–2022); Mercedes-Benz Group (2022–present)
- Also called: Freightliner Sprinter (2001–2021); Dodge Sprinter (2003–2009); Volkswagen Crafter (2006–2017)
- Production: 1995–present
- Model years: 1995–present (Europe); 2002–present (North America)
- Assembly: Germany: Düsseldorf (Mercedes-Benz Werk Düsseldorf); Ludwigsfelde (Mercedes-Benz Werk Ludwigsfelde); Algeria: Tiaret (Mercedes-Benz Algeria); Jordan: Amman (Elbahouse); Argentina: Buenos Aires (Mercedes-Benz Argentina, Juan Manuel Fangio Plant); United States: Gaffney, South Carolina (Freightliner Gaffney Plant); Ladson, South Carolina (Freightliner Ladson Plant) (until 2019); Charleston, South Carolina (Mercedes-Benz Vans, LLC) (since 2019); China: Tai'an (Xinkai Auto); Fúzhōu (Fujian Daimler); Iran: Tehran (Iran Khodro Diesel); Russia: Nizhny Novgorod (GAZ, first generation)

Body and chassis
- Class: Light commercial vehicle (M) (N1); Large van (U.S.)
- Body style: 4-door van; 2-door pickup truck; 4-door crew van 4-door minibus
- Layout: FF layout (2019–present); FR layout; F4 layout
- Related: Volkswagen Crafter; Volkswagen Transporter LT; Force Urbania

Chronology
- Predecessor: Mercedes-Benz TN (since 1995); Dodge Ram Van (since 2003); Light versions of Mercedes-Benz Vario (since 2013)
- Successor: Ram ProMaster (for Dodge versions)

The Mercedes-Benz Sprinter is a light commercial vehicle (van) built by Mercedes-Benz Group AG of Stuttgart, Germany, as a large van, chassis cab, minibus, and pickup truck. In the past, the Sprinter had been sold under the Mercedes-Benz, Dodge, and Freightliner nameplates. In the U.S., it was built from complete knock down (CKD) kits by Freightliner. Re-badged and re-engined Sprinters were also sold by Volkswagen Commercial Vehicles as the Volkswagen LT and the Volkswagen Crafter. They are now primarily marketed by Mercedes-Benz.

In the Mercedes-Benz van lineup, the Sprinter is the largest model offered, followed by the mid-size Vito (aka Viano, V-Class, and EQV) and small Citan.

== First generation (1995; W903) ==
First generation (W903)
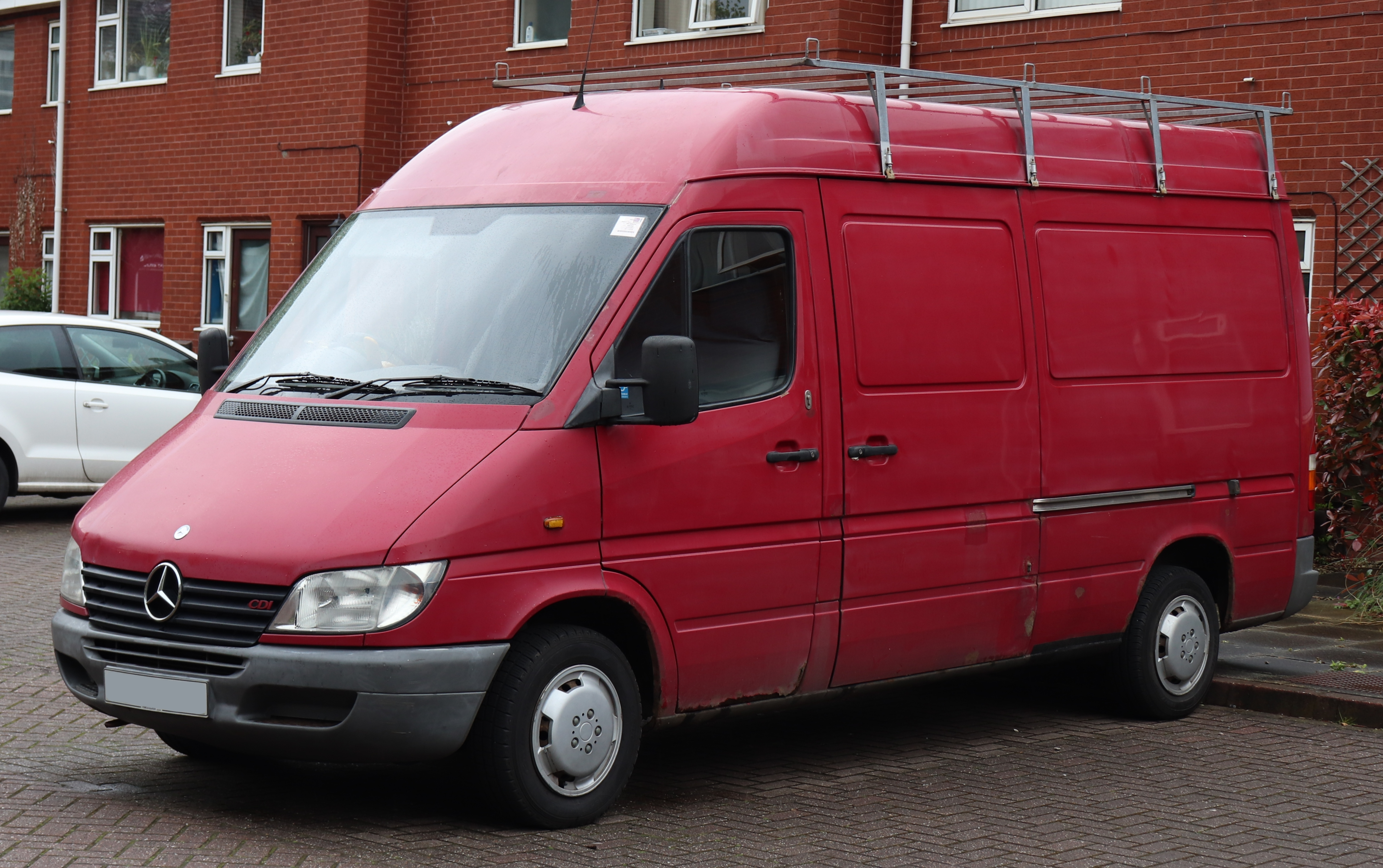

Overview
- Also called: Dodge Sprinter (2003–2006); Freightliner Sprinter; Mercedes-Benz Transporter T1N; Sprinter 314 (Iran); Mercedes Benz Sprinter Classic (Russia)
- Production: 1995–2006 (Europe); 2001–2007 (North America); 2013–2020 (As Sprinter Classic by MB and GAZ; Russia Only)

Body and chassis
- Body style: 2-door pickup truck; 4-door van; 4-door minibus
- Layout: FR layout; F4 layout
- Platform: Mercedes-Benz T1N
- Related: Volkswagen LT

Powertrain
- Engine: Phase I 1995–2000: 2.3L I4 OM601 79 hp Diesel; 2.9L I5 OM602 102 hp Turbodiesel; 2.9L I5 OM602 129 hp Turbodiesel; 2.3L I4 M111 143 hp DOHC 16v MPI; Phase II 2000–2006: 2.1L I4 OM611 82 hp CDI; 2.1L I4 OM611 109 hp CDI; 2.1L I4 OM611 129 hp CDI; 2.7L I5 OM612/OM647 156 hp CDI; 2.3L I4 M111 143 hp DOHC 16V MPI
- Transmission: 5-speed manual 5-speed automatic

Chronology
- Predecessor: Mercedes-Benz TN

=== Europe ===
The first-generation Sprinter was launched in Europe in 1995 to replace the T1 Transporter van dating from 1977. Compared to the T1, the Sprinter had reduced the aerodynamic drag and moved the engine 290 mm (11 in) further forward to increase cabin space. It was the first Mercedes-Benz product to carry a name rather than an alphanumeric designation. It was released with four-wheel disc brakes equipped with an anti-lock braking system and was driven by the most powerful diesel engine in its class, with a power output of 90 kW (120 hp). The Sprinter was voted International Van of the Year for 1995.

The styling was updated in 2000 and 2002, accompanied by technical changes that included standard electronic stability control (2002).

=== North America ===
North American Sprinters

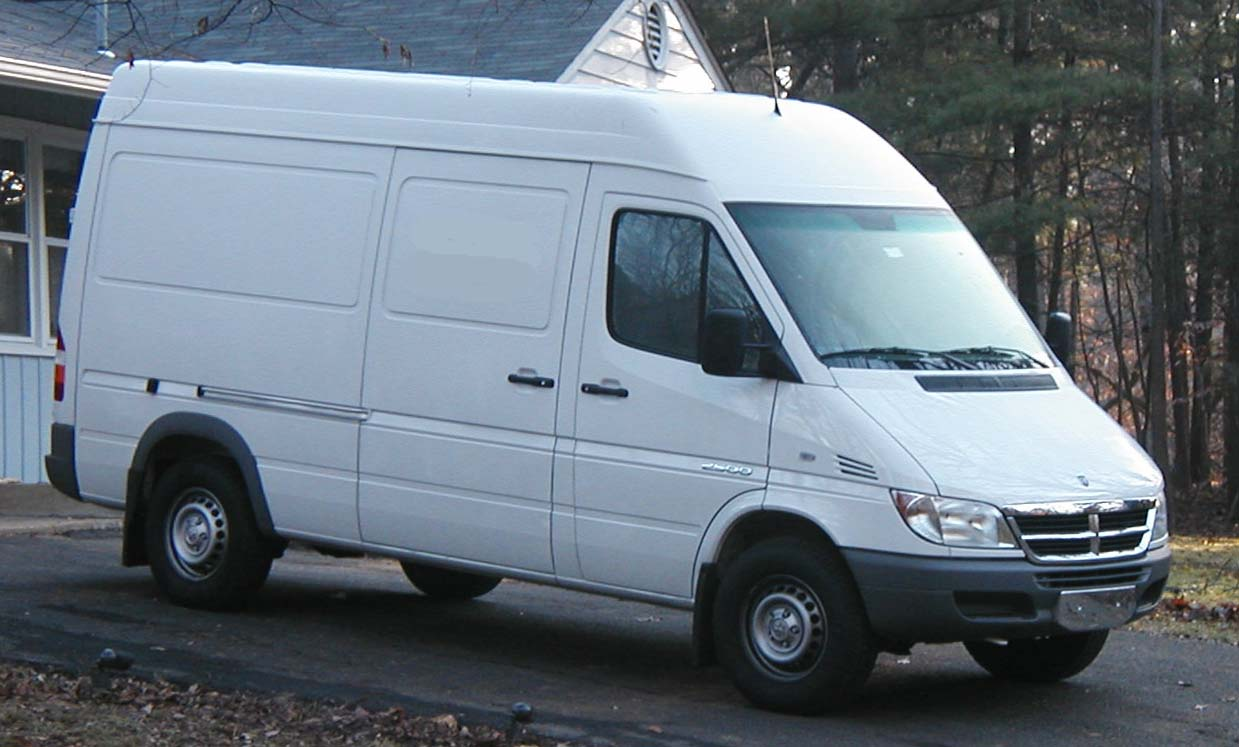
Dodge

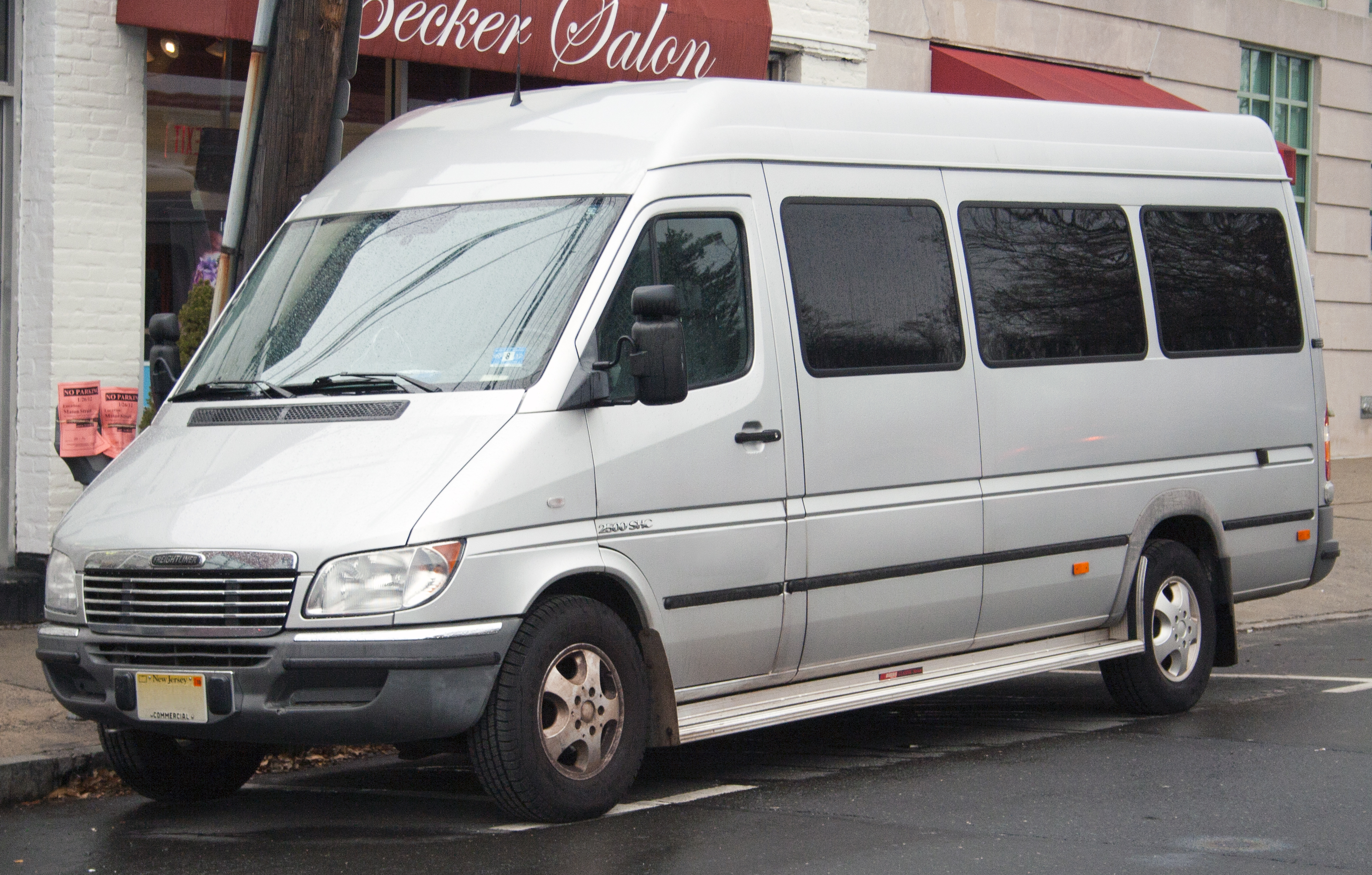
Freightliner

The first generation (VA chassis) Sprinter was launched in North America for the 2002 model year and was originally badged as a Freightliner. In 2003 it received Dodge branding as DaimlerChrysler chose to replace the aging Dodge Ram van with the Sprinter. After 2003 they were sold concurrently under the Freightliner and Dodge nameplates and were identical except for minor styling details and badging. DaimlerChrysler chose to not badge the Sprinter as a Mercedes-Benz because they felt the utilitarian Sprinter would interfere with the luxury image that Mercedes-Benz has in North America, whereas Freightliner and Dodge have more experience selling trucks and commercial vehicles.

Cargo versions of the Sprinter were manufactured in Düsseldorf, Germany, partially disassembled, and then shipped to a Freightliner factory in Gaffney, South Carolina, where they were reassembled. The cargo versions, classified as light trucks, are subject to the 25% chicken tax if imported as a complete unit, which is avoided by the disassembly and importation as a semi knock-down kit, with subsequent reassembly in the U.S. Passenger vans were not subject to the same tax classifications and were imported as an assembled unit through Mercedes-Benz in Jacksonville, Florida.

2002–2003 Sprinters sold in North America were only available with the 2.7L OM612 inline-5 diesel engine and were only available in 49 states because it was not compliant with CARB emissions standards; 2004–2006 models used the OM647 engine which replaced the OM612's air-cooled EGR valve with a water-cooled unit, among other changes, which made the 2004–2006 Sprinters CARB-compliant. The only transmission offered in North America was the 5-speed 5G-Tronic transmission.

The product was launched and supported by DaimlerChrysler Vans LLC, a small division based in Huntersville, North Carolina. Key individuals from DaimlerChrysler Commercial Vehicle Division and Freightliner Trucks were selected to spearhead the effort and made up the bulk of the division. DaimlerChrysler Vans LLC retained sole responsibility for the North American Sprinter market until the sales, service and parts support responsibilities were absorbed by Chrysler Commercial Vehicle Division in 2004. Nearly all of the original staff were retained, though the base of operations shifted from North Carolina to Auburn Hills, Michigan.

=== Japan ===
The Sprinter van was sold as the Mercedes-Benz Transporter T1N due to Toyota using the name Toyota Sprinter, a version of the Corolla.

=== Iran ===
The model 314 of the first generation is still assembled by Iran Khodro Diesel. It is used as an ambulance.

=== Vietnam ===
The first generation Sprinter was assembled by Mercedes Benz Vietnam in Ho Chi Minh City from CKD kits to avoid high local import duties.

=== Sprinter Classic ===
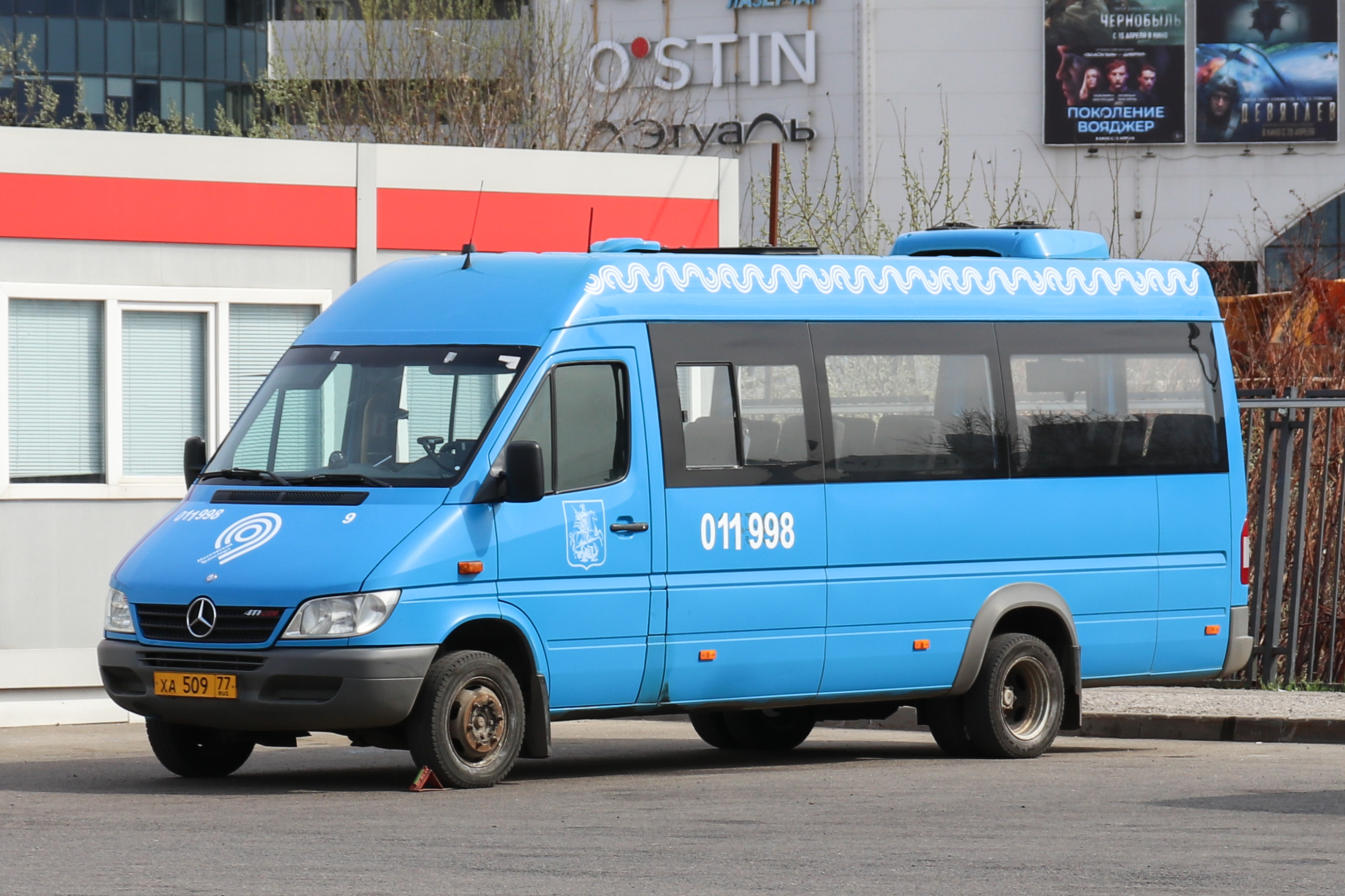
Sprinter Classic (Russia)

Since 2013, the 2000–2006 Sprinter model has been revived in Russian markets only as the Mercedes-Benz Sprinter Classic. The Phase II 2002–2006 grille was chosen for use on the Sprinter Classic and the 2000–2006 dashboard design. The Sprinter Classic used the steering wheel from the 2006–2014 Sprinter models. The Sprinter Classic is built by the Gorky Automobile Plant at Nizhny Novgorod for service in Russian/Eastern European markets only.

=== Engines ===
Models	Engine code	Configuration	Displacement	Max. power	Max. torque
208 D; 308 D; 408 D	OM 601	Inline-four 8V SOHC	2,299 cc (140.3 cu in)	79 PS (58 kW; 78 hp)	152 N⋅m (112 lbf⋅ft)
210 D; 310 D; 410 D	OM 602	Inline-five 10V OHC	2,874 cc (175.4 cu in)	102 PS (75 kW; 101 hp)	250 N⋅m (184 lbf⋅ft)
212 D; 312 D; 412 D	OM 602	Inline-five 10V OHC	2,874 cc (175.4 cu in)	122 PS (90 kW; 120 hp)	275 N⋅m (203 lbf⋅ft)
214; 314; 414	M 111	Inline-four 16V DOHC	2,295 cc (140.0 cu in)	143 PS (105 kW; 141 hp)	210 N⋅m (155 lbf⋅ft)

=== Dimensions ===
Key Sprinter (1st generation) dimensions
Length Height				Short		Medium	Long
Length Height				Exterior	5,004 mm (197 in)	5,715 mm (225 in)	6,680 mm (263 in)
Length Height				WB	2,997 mm (118 in)	3,556 mm (140 in)	4,013 mm (158 in)
Length Height				Interior	2,515 mm (99.0 in)	3,264 mm (128.5 in)	4,214 mm (165.9 in)
Std.	Exterior	Interior	Volume	7.0 m^{3} (247 ft^{3})		9.1 m^{3} (321 ft^{3})	N/A
Std.	2,365–2,405 mm (93.1–94.7 in)	1,631 mm (64.2 in)	Volume	7.0 m^{3} (247 ft^{3})		9.1 m^{3} (321 ft^{3})	N/A
High	2,591–2,631 mm (102–103.6 in)	1,854 mm (73 in)	Volume	8.1 m^{3} (286 ft^{3})		10.4 m^{3} (367 ft^{3})	13.4 m^{3} (473 ft^{3})

Notes

- Interior width is 1,735 mm (68.3 in) for all versions.

=== Fuel economy ===
With 2.7L I5 OM 612/OM 647 156 hp CDI engine:

Model	Roof Height	Wheelbase	Manufacturer estimated miles per gallon
2500	Standard Roof	140"	24
2500	High Roof	158"	22
3500	High Roof	158"	21

=== Diesel hybrid concepts ===
In 2004, A Plug-in hybrid prototype version and a non-plug-in hybrid prototype version of the van were made, The plug-in van had an electric motor with an output of 70 kW (94 hp) and an NiMH battery with a capacity of 14kWh. Which supported an all-electric operating range of up to 30 kilometers (19 miles). The battery recharged from the plug-in to the main power supply in approximately 6 hours. the non-plug-in van had a smaller electric motor with an output of 30 kW (40 hp) and smaller batteries with a capacity of only 3 kWh. These allowed purely electric operation with a range of 3 to 4 km (1.9 to 2.5 mi).

=== Gallery ===
Pre-facelift

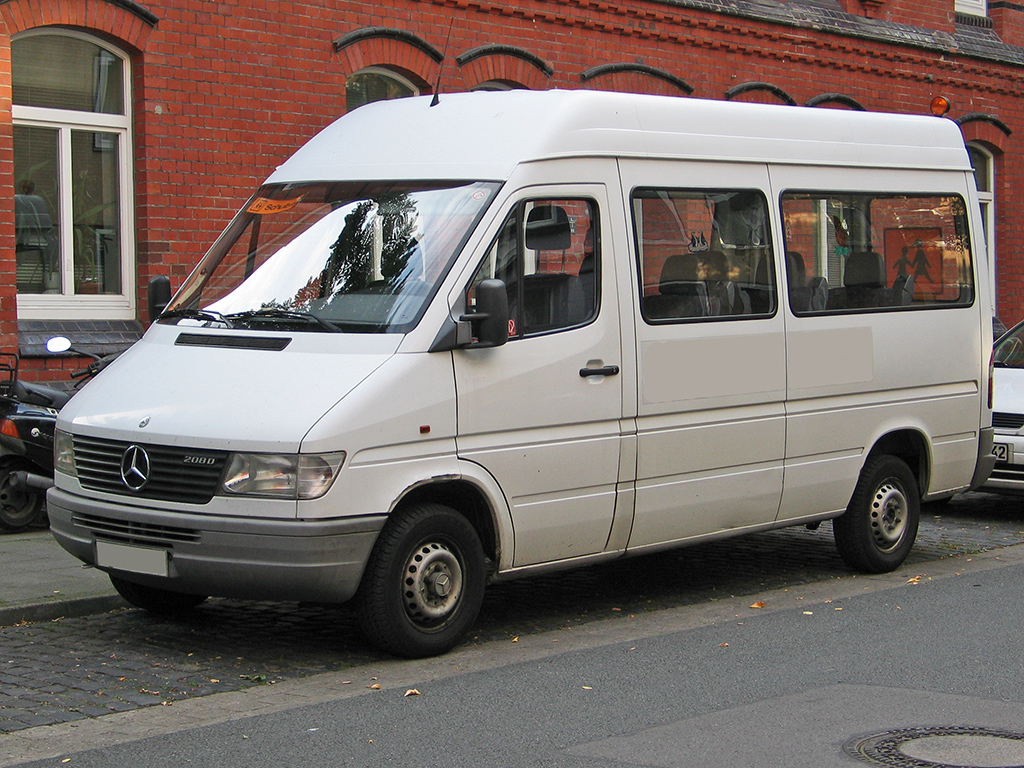
Front

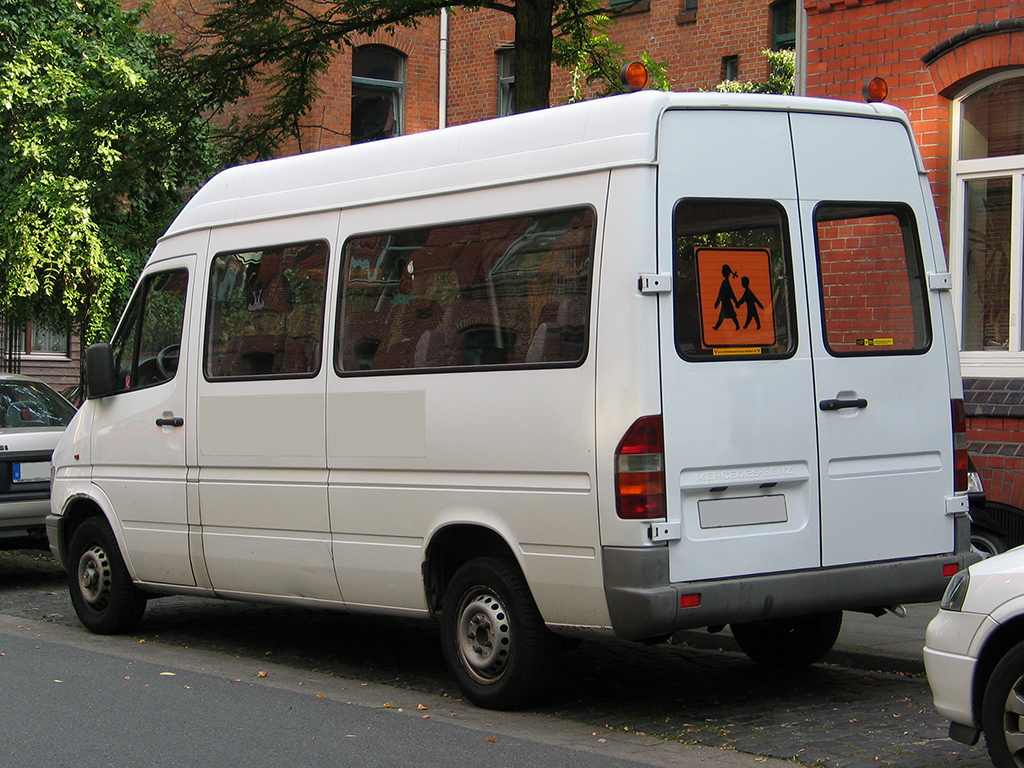
Rear

Facelift

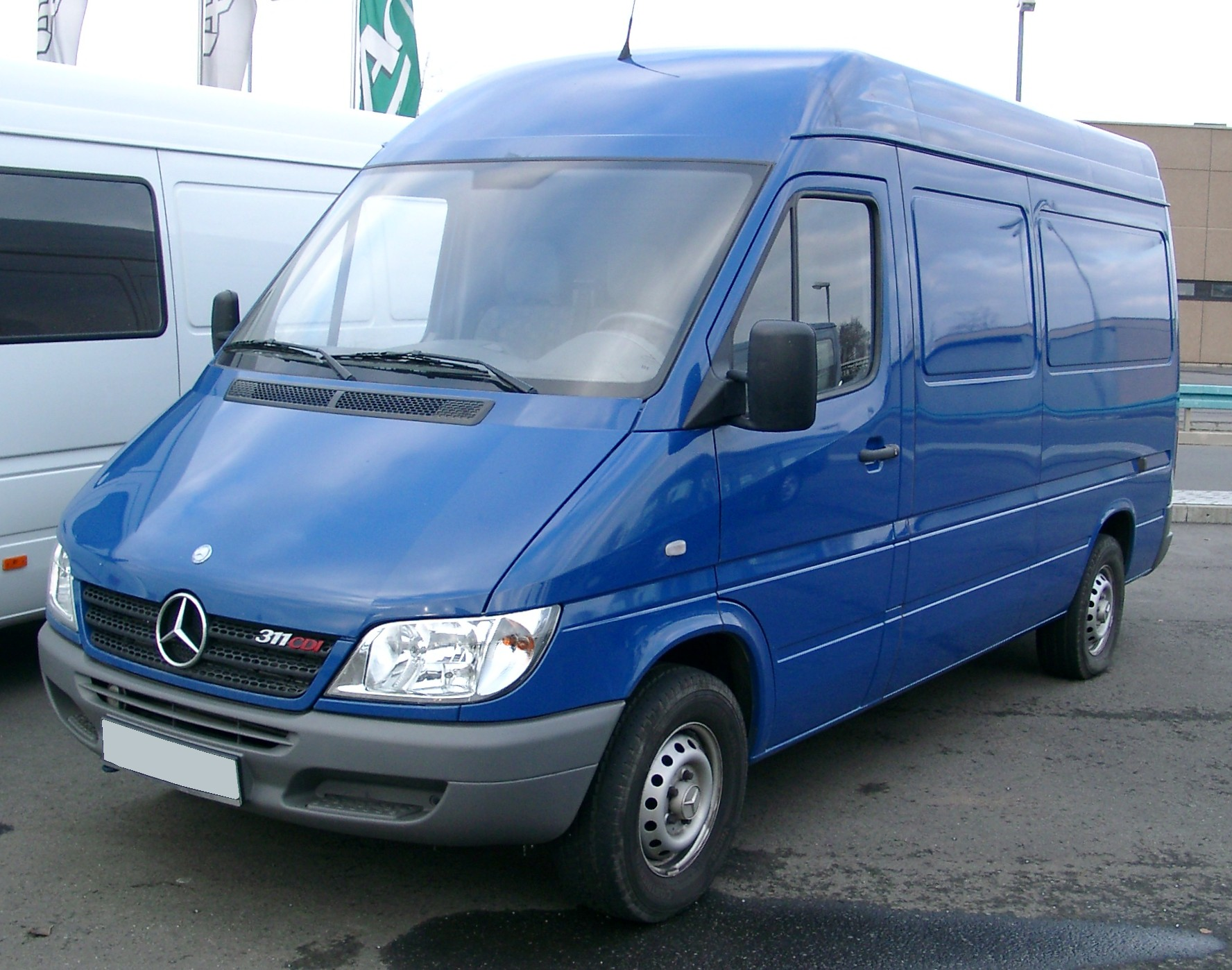
Front

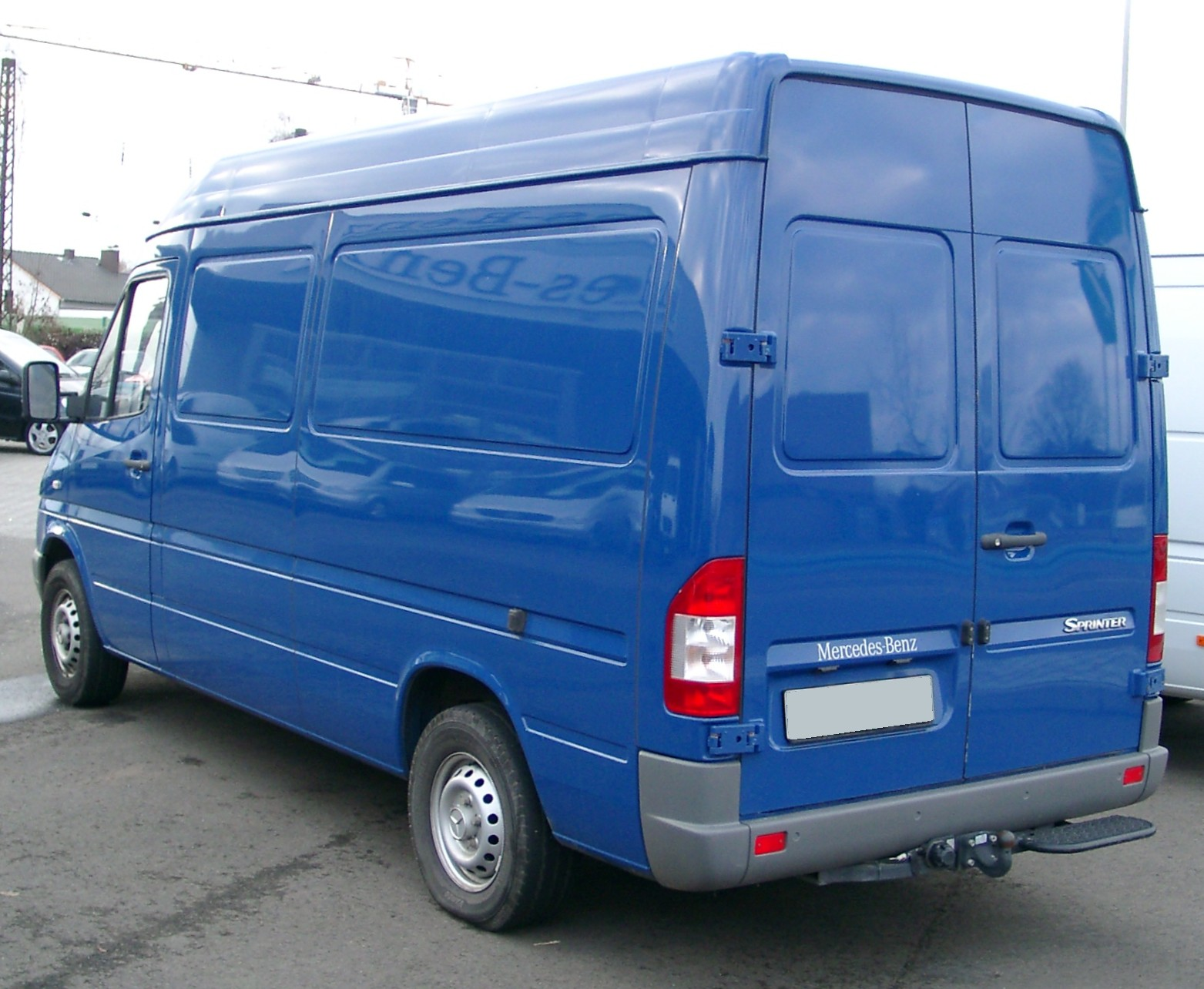
Rear

== Second generation (2006; W906) ==
Second generation (W906)
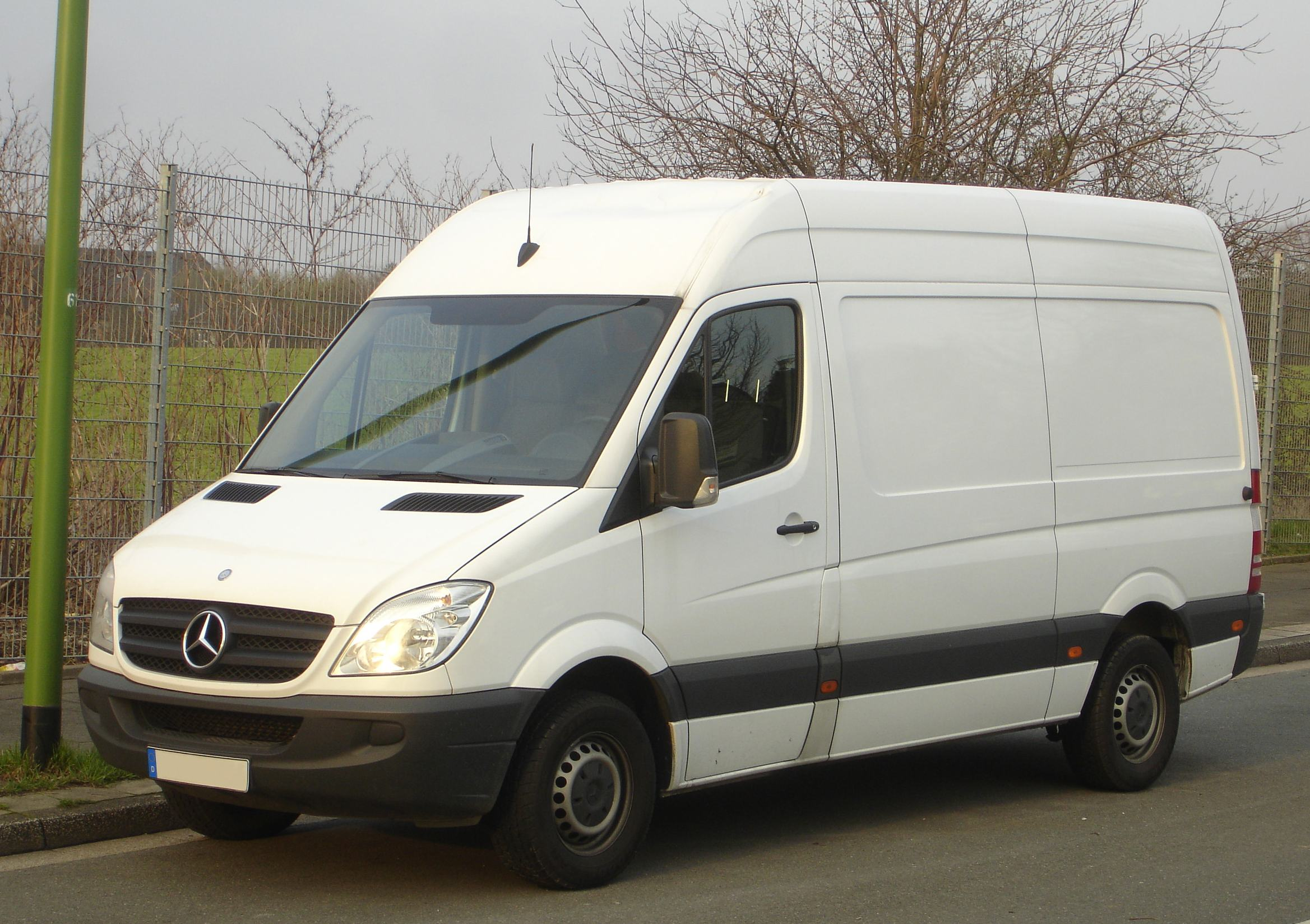

Overview
- Also called: Freightliner Sprinter; Dodge Sprinter (2007–2009); Volkswagen Crafter (2006–2017)
- Production: 2006–2018 (Europe); 2006–2017 (Volkswagen Crafter); 2007–2009 (Dodge Sprinter); 2007–2018 (Freightliner Sprinter); 2007–2010 & 2012–present (Argentina); 2014–present (Algeria: Tiaret)
- Designer: Laurent Boulay

Body and chassis
- Body style: 2-door pickup truck; 4-door van; 4-door minibus
- Layout: FR layout; F4 layout
- Platform: Mercedes-Benz NCV3

Powertrain
- Engine: 1.8L I4 M271; 2.1L I4 OM646 CDI; 2.1L I4 OM651 CDI; 3.0L V6 OM642 CDI; 3.5L V6 M272
- Transmission: 6-speed manual; 5-speed automatic; 7-speed automatic

Dimensions
- Length: SWB: 5,425 mm (213.6 in); MWB: 5,910 mm (232.7 in); LWB: 6,945 mm (273.4 in); XLWB: 7,345 mm (289.2 in)
- Height: 2,435–3,005 mm (95.9–118.3 in)

Chronology
- Successor: Ram ProMaster (for Dodge Sprinter)

=== Initial release ===
The second-generation Sprinter was introduced in Europe in 2006. It was voted Van of the Year for 2007 and again in 2008 by Professional Van and Light Truck Magazine.

Also known as the NCV3 or New Concept Van 3, the second generation Sprinter appeared in Europe and in other countries as the 2006 model year. North America received its own NCV3 for the 2007 model year.

By 2010 a BlueTEC version of the NCV3 Sprinter with the OM642 was released. The BlueTEC systems allowed the elimination of much of the EGR in that vehicle's engine, which as a result gave 188 horsepower (140 kilowatts) compared to the non-BlueTec engine's 154 horsepower (115 kilowatts).

The U.S. cargo version of the 906 NCV3 came in two wheelbase options (144", 170"), two roof heights (standard 60.6", high 72.4"), three lengths (Short 233.3", Standard 274.2, Extended 289.8"), and two weight classes (2500, 3500). 3500 models had the option of dual rear wheels or extra-wide "super single" wheels in some, but not all, markets. Neither the 128" wheelbase nor the rear super single tires were available in the U.S. market. The U.S. cargo version was reassembled from kits in an assembly plant located in Ladson, South Carolina, while the passenger models were imported directly from Germany.

The second-generation 906 was produced in Argentina only for export markets—except Mercosur markets (Brazil, Uruguay and Paraguay)—from 2007 until 2010, but in 2011, announced new production of the second generation in the Centro Industrial J. Manuel Fangio, in Buenos Aires with the brand-new OM 651 engine (also locally made) and exported to the rest of South America (including Mercosur markets). Since 2012, it has been manufactured for the Mercosur and 40 other countries. 70% of its production is exported.

=== Production ===
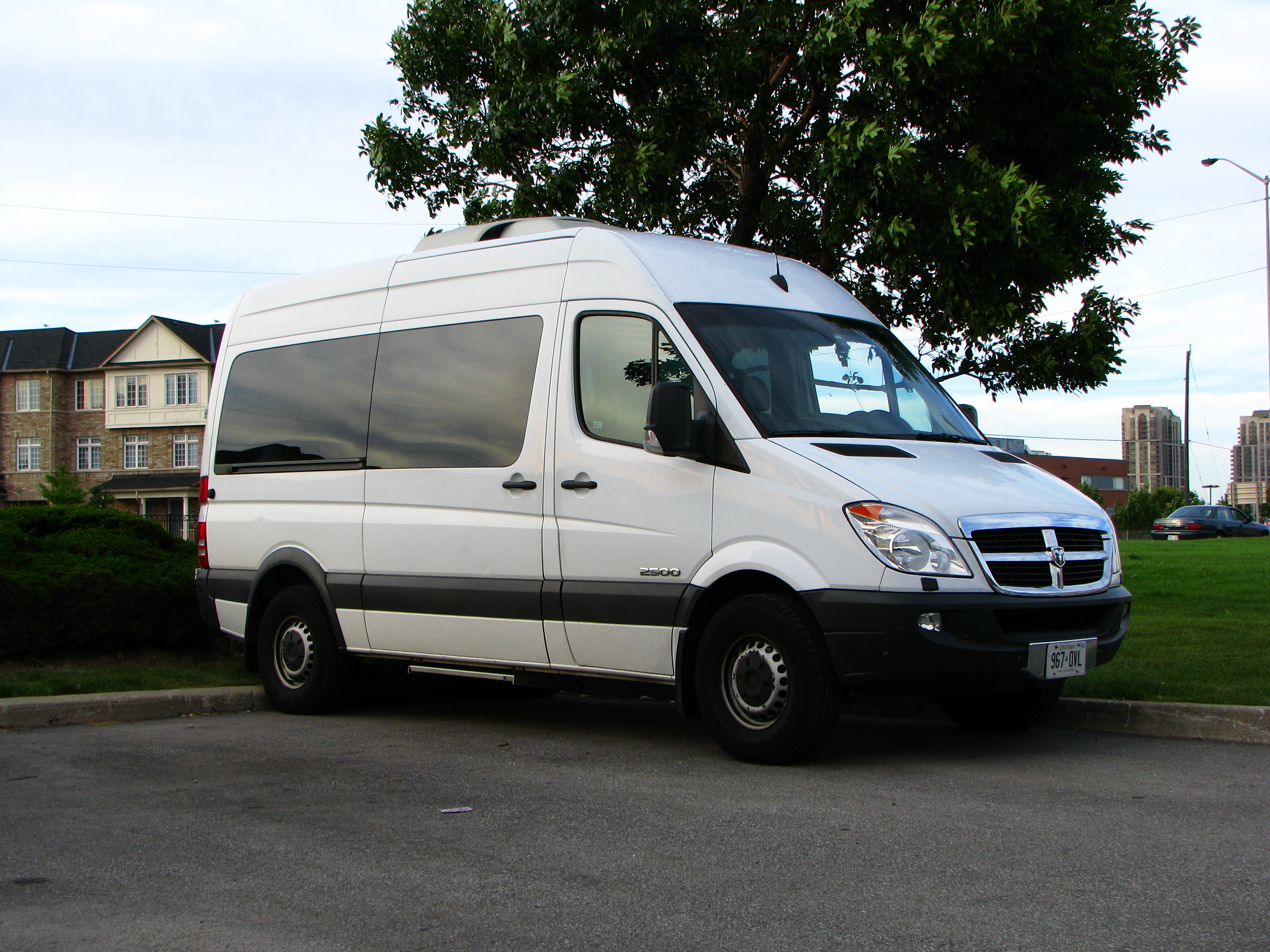
Dodge Sprinter

The Mercedes-Benz Sprinter was built in Daimler's Mercedes-Benz Düsseldorf and Ludwigsfelde production plants.

For the second-generation Sprinter marketed in the United States, to avoid "chicken tax" import duties, the cargo version was disassembled partially, shipped to the United States, and reassembled at a plant in Ladson, South Carolina (near North Charleston), in a process known as semi knock-down assembly (SKD), starting in June 2006; the passenger version continued to be imported as a complete unit. The Ladson factory previously was used as an American LaFrance factory for firefighting trucks. The previous SKD reassembly facility in Gaffney resumed operations under Freightliner Custom Chassis Corporation. The Ladson plant was known as DaimlerChrysler Manufacturing International until the parent corporation was dissolved; importation and SKD reassembly of the Sprinter cargo van continued at Ladson under the auspices of Mercedes-Benz Vans, LLC.

Between July 2013 and the end of May 2014, Mercedes-Benz Vans sold around 134,000 units of the new model of Mercedes-Benz Sprinter in Europe and North America.

The production version of the Sprinter-based Volkswagen Crafter by Mercedes-Benz Vans was set to end in 2016.

A class action lawsuit was filed in California state court against Mercedes-Benz alleging the defendant had sold Mercedes-Benz Sprinter 2500 and 3500 models with water that leaked from the roof air conditioning unit into the passenger area. The leaking air conditioning unit was also discovered on Dodge Sprinters made by Mercedes-Benz from 2003 through 2009. The lawsuit affected California residents with the rooftop AC units and Sprinters equipped with the rear AC.

==== Algeria ====
From 2014, Algeria started manufacturing the latest model of Sprinter 319/519 4×2 and 4×4 for civilian and military use.

=== Marketing ===
Mercedes-Benz Sprinter vans were used in the Boost by Mercedes-Benz custom transportation program.

=== Updates ===
==== Sprinter (2013–2019) ====
The second generation Sprinter was updated in 2013 with changes including the addition of new assistance systems (crosswind stabilization, collision avoidance system (optional), blind spot monitor (optional), adaptive highbeam, lane departure warning system), Euro VI emissions compliance, redesigned radiator grille, more angular headlights, new upholstery and seat coverings, thicker steering wheel, optional fresh air nozzles boast chrome applications, new-generation radio system.

The vehicle was unveiled in 2014 International Commercial Vehicles show.

Ordering began in June 2013, followed by deliveries in September 2013. Early models include ECO-Gear six-speed manual transmission or the 7G-TRONIC PLUS seven-speed automatic transmission with lock-up clutch.

US models went on sale in the fall of 2013 as 2014 model year vehicles. Early models included a choice of 2 engines (2.1-liter 4-cylinder turbo diesel (163PS) with 7-speed automatic, 3.0-liter V6 turbo diesel (190PS) with 5-speed automatic), 144" & 170" wheelbase (both engines), 3 body lengths, high-roof option, 5 configurations (Cargo, Crew, Passenger, MiniBus, Cab Chassis).

In September 2018, e-commerce platform Amazon announced that they had contracted to acquire 20,000 Amazon-badged Sprinters to be available for small business partners of their proprietary logistics service.

==== Sprinter 4x4 (2015–2019) ====
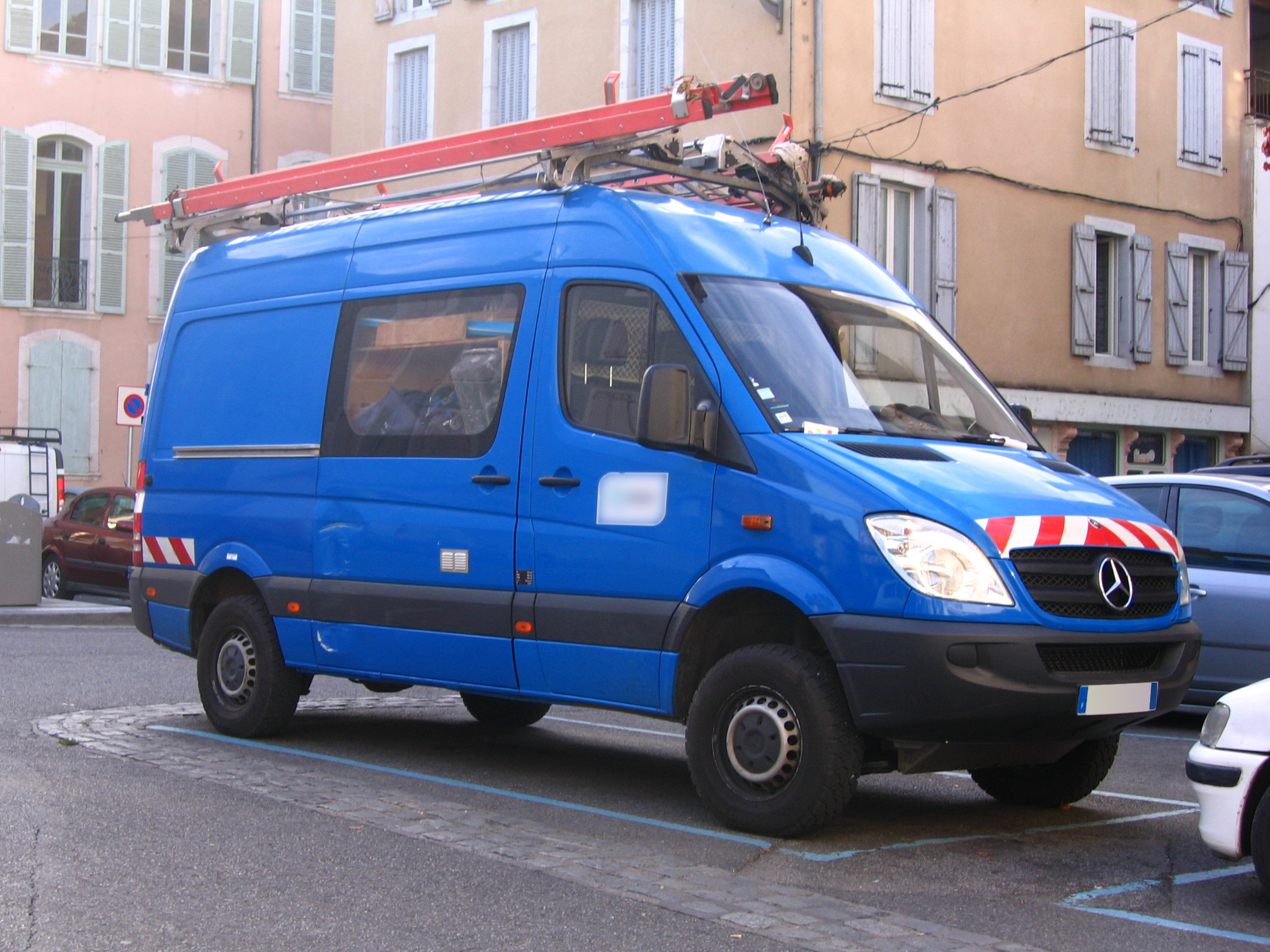
Sprinter 4x4

Early models include Sprinter 313/513 BlueTec 4x4, Sprinter 316/516 BlueTec 4x4, Sprinter 319/519 BlueTec 4x4; Eco Gear six-speed manual or five-speed automatic (transmission with converter Sprinter 319/519 BlueTec 4x4).

US models were set to go on sale in the first quarter of 2015 as 2015 model year vehicles. Early models included 144" and 170" wheelbases in low and high roof configurations, 5 body styles (Passenger Van, Crew Van (mixed 2-row passenger and cargo application), and Cargo Van (both 8,550 and 11,030 GVWRs)), 1 engine choice (3.0 L V6 BlueTEC (exclusive 4x4 powertrain)).

==== 2014 facelift ====
For the 2014 model year, the Sprinter received an updated grille with Mercedes-Benz's signature three-slat design. In an effort to make the Sprinter's fuel economy more competitive, North American models received the 2.1L OM651 two-stage turbo diesel engine formerly only available overseas, along with an optional 3.0L engine. The 2.1L engine (and in Europe, also the 3.0L) was mated to a new 7-speed automatic transmission. A 1.8L supercharged I-4 gasoline engine was mated to 6- and 7- speed automatic transmissions. The 2014 Sprinter added several new driver assistance technologies including standard Crosswind Assist, optional Blind Spot Assist and Collision Prevention Assist, as well as Lane Keeping Assist and Highbeam Assist. The 2014 Sprinter began offering LED running lights. Air suspension was an available option on the 3500-series model. The 2014 Sprinter also gained navigation, iPod integration, and an air suspension for heavier-duty models.

Pre-facelift

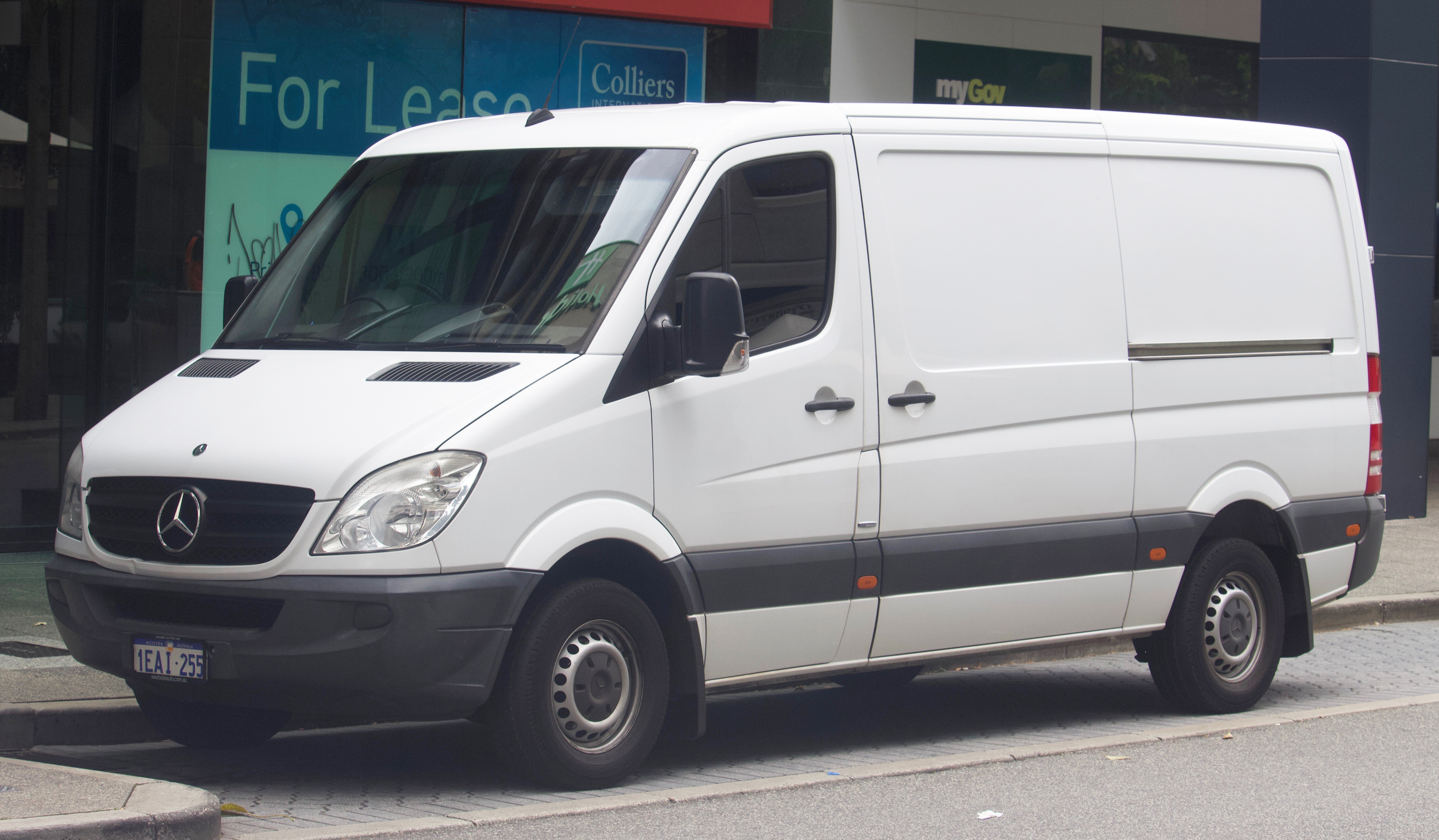
Front

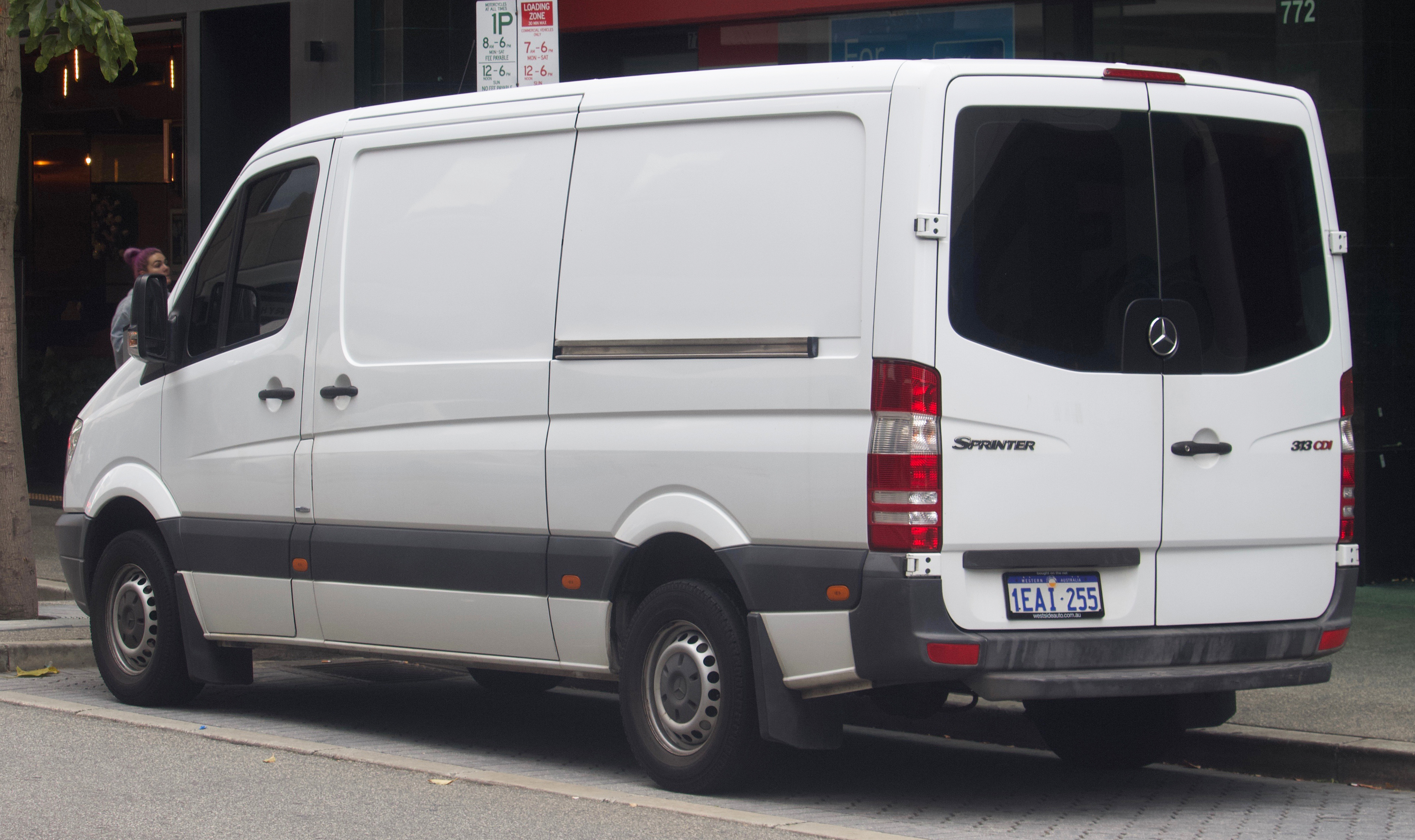
Rear

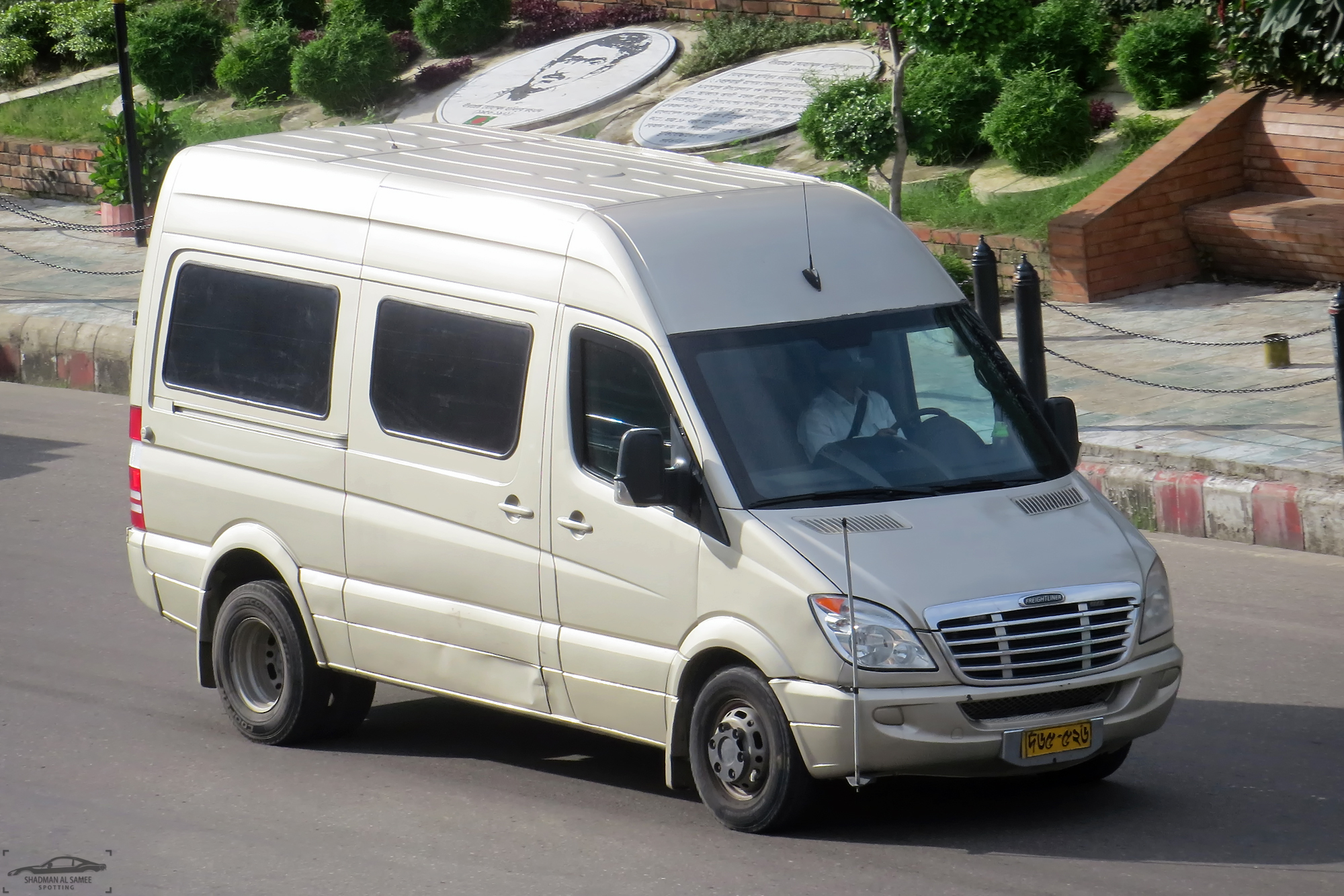
Freightliner Sprinter

Facelift

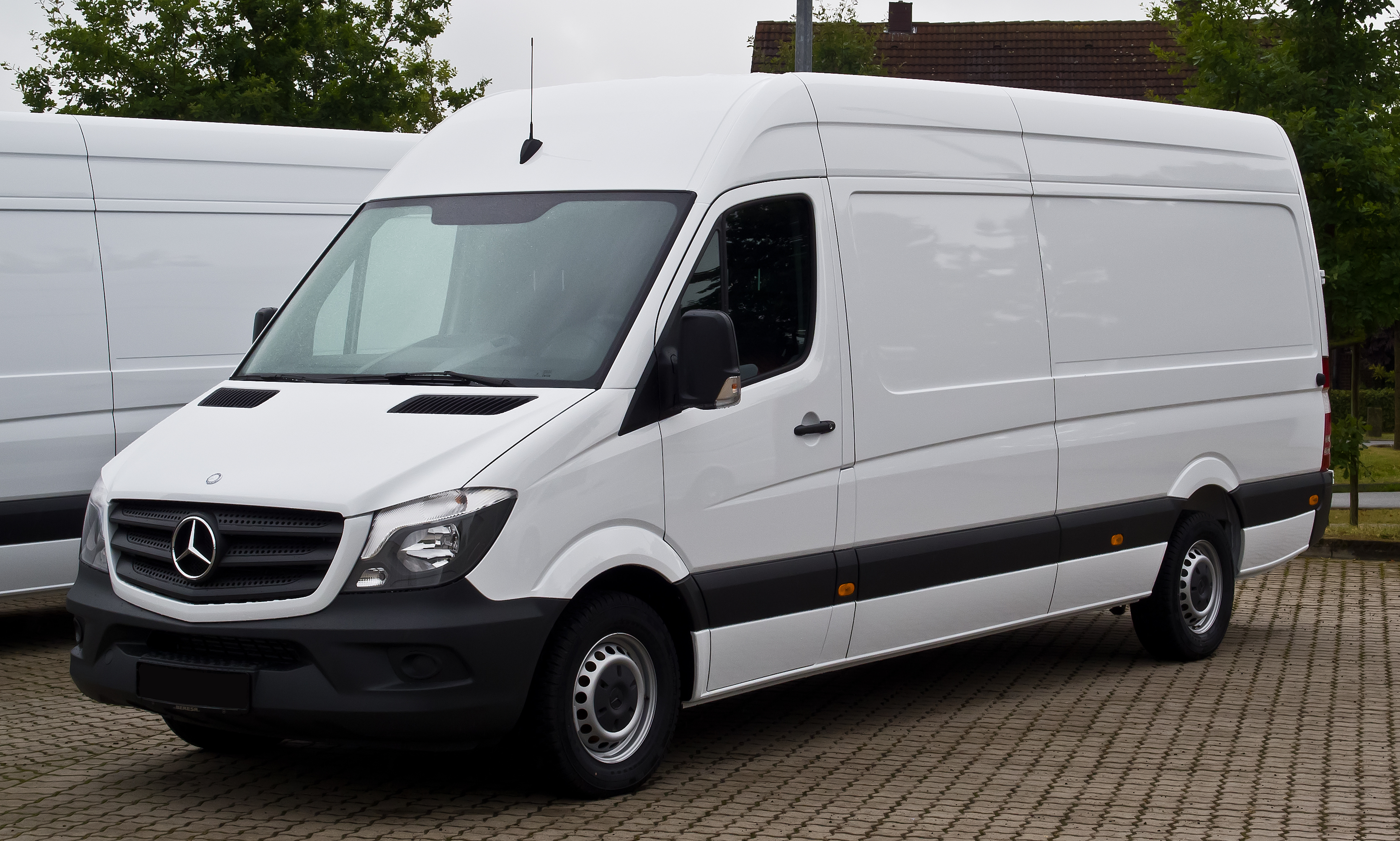
Front

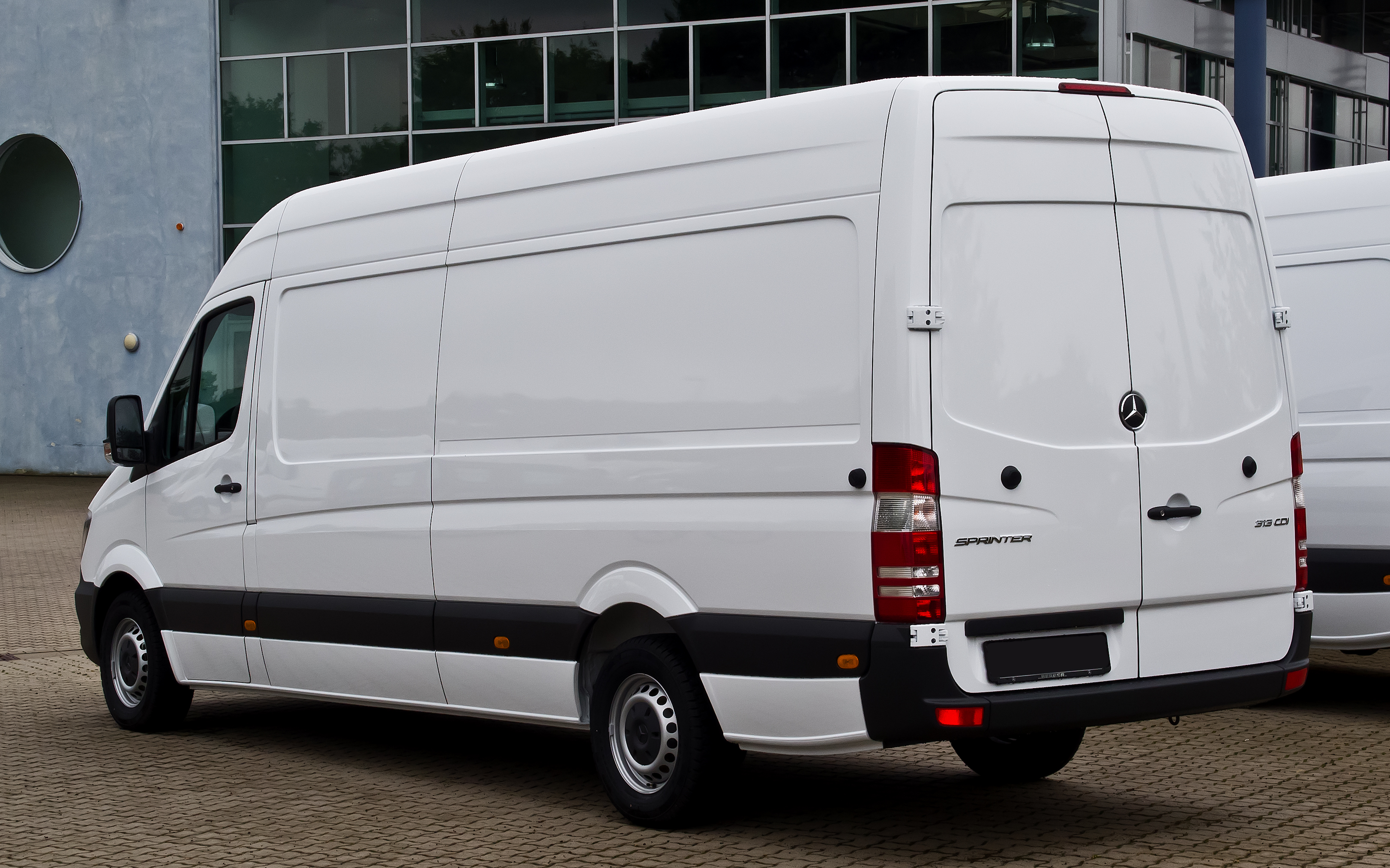
Rear

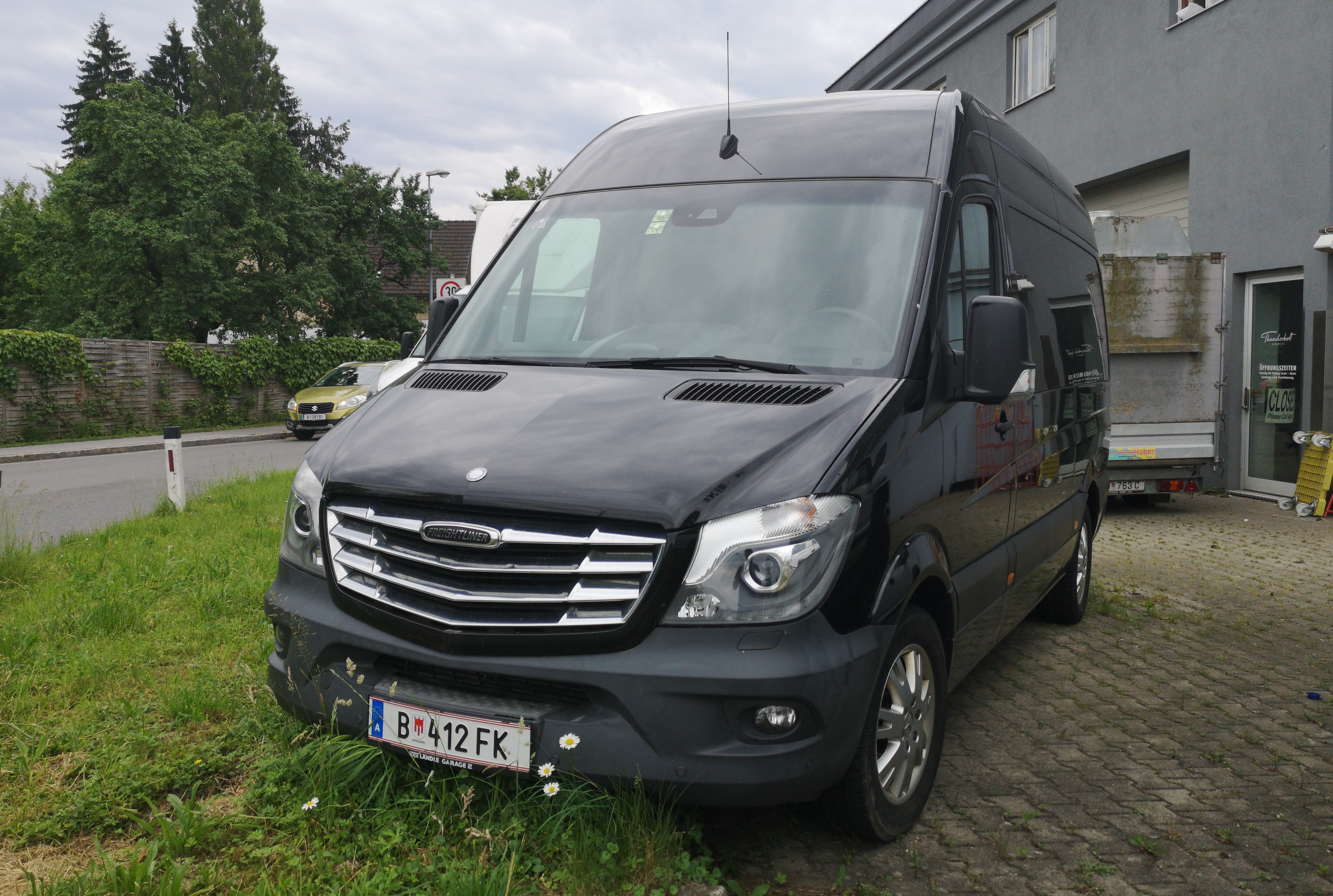
Freightliner Sprinter

==== 20th Anniversary Edition ====
For the UK market in 2015, to celebrate 20 years since the first Sprinters were manufactured, a run of 1,200 special edition vans were sold to the public. These vans included the following additional interior comforts and exterior trim level:

- Air conditioning
- Integrated Satellite navigation
- Driver's comfort seat and armrest
- Wheel trims
- Chrome grille
- Chrome 'Sprinter 20' badging on the front wing

=== Engines ===
Engines
Model	Years	Type	Code	Output (@RPM)	
Model	Years	Type	Code	Power	Torque
Petrol engines
216; 316	2014–	1,796 cc (109.6 cu in) I4 supercharged	M 271 E 18 ML	156 PS (115 kW; 154 hp) @5000	240 N⋅m (177 lbf⋅ft) @3000–4000
Natural gas engines
316 NGT	2014–	1,796 cc (109.6 cu in) I4 supercharged	M 271 E 18 ML	156 PS (115 kW; 154 hp) @5000	240 N⋅m (177 lbf⋅ft) @3000–4000
Diesel engines
210 BlueTEC; 310 BlueTEC; 510 BlueTEC	2014–	2,143 cc (130.8 cu in) I4 two-stage turbo	OM 651 DE 22 LA	95 PS (70 kW; 94 hp) @3800	250 N⋅m (184 lbf⋅ft) @1400–2400
213 BlueTEC; 313 BlueTEC; 413 BlueTEC; 513 BlueTEC	2014–	2,143 cc (130.8 cu in) I4 two-stage turbo	OM 651 DE 22 LA	129 PS (95 kW; 127 hp) @3800	305 N⋅m (225 lbf⋅ft) @1400–2400
216 BlueTEC; 316 BlueTEC; 416 BlueTEC; 516 BlueTEC	2014–	2,143 cc (130.8 cu in) I4 two-stage turbo	OM 651 DE 22 LA	163 PS (120 kW; 161 hp) @3800	360 N⋅m (266 lbf⋅ft) @1400–2400
219 BlueTEC; 319 BlueTEC; 419 BlueTEC; 519 BlueTEC	2014–	2,987 cc (182.3 cu in) V6 turbo	OM 642 DE 30 LA	190 PS (140 kW; 187 hp) @3800	440 N⋅m (325 lbf⋅ft) @1600–2600

=== Dimensions ===
Key Sprinter (2nd generation) dimensions
Length Height				Standard		Long	Extended
Length Height				Exterior	5,926 mm (233.3 in)	6,965 mm (274.2 in)	7,361 mm (289.8 in)
Length Height				WB	3,665 mm (144.3 in)	4,326 mm (170.3 in)	
Length Height				Interior (Note: Interior width is 1,781 mm (70.1 in) for all versions)	3,266 mm (128.6 in)	4,300 mm (169.3 in)	4,702 mm (185.1 in)
Standard	Exterior	Interior	Volume	9.0 m^{3} (319.1 ft^{3})		N/A	
Standard	2,446–2,469 mm (96.3–97.2 in)	1,651 mm (65.0 in)	Volume	9.0 m^{3} (319.1 ft^{3})		N/A	
High	2,730–2,814 mm (107.5–110.8 in)	1,986 mm (78.2 in)	Volume (SRW) (Note: Single rear wheel, 1,349 mm (53.1 in) wide between internal wheel arches)	10.6 m^{3} (373.8 ft^{3})		13.8 m^{3} (486.5 ft^{3})	15.0 m^{3} (530.0 ft^{3})
High	2,730–2,814 mm (107.5–110.8 in)	1,986 mm (78.2 in)	Volume (DRW) (Note: Dual rear wheels, 978 mm (38.5 in) wide between internal wheel arches)	9.3 m^{3} (329.3 ft^{3})		12.1 m^{3} (428.7 ft^{3})	13.2 m^{3} (467.0 ft^{3})
Super High	3,051 mm (120.1 in)	2,141 mm (84.3 in)	Volume (SRW)	N/A		15.2 m^{3} (538.0 ft^{3})	16.6 m^{3} (586.1 ft^{3})
Super High	3,051 mm (120.1 in)	2,141 mm (84.3 in)	Volume (DRW)	N/A		13.4 m^{3} (474.0 ft^{3})	14.6 m^{3} (516.5 ft^{3})

== Third generation (2019; W907/W910) ==
Third generation (W907/W910)
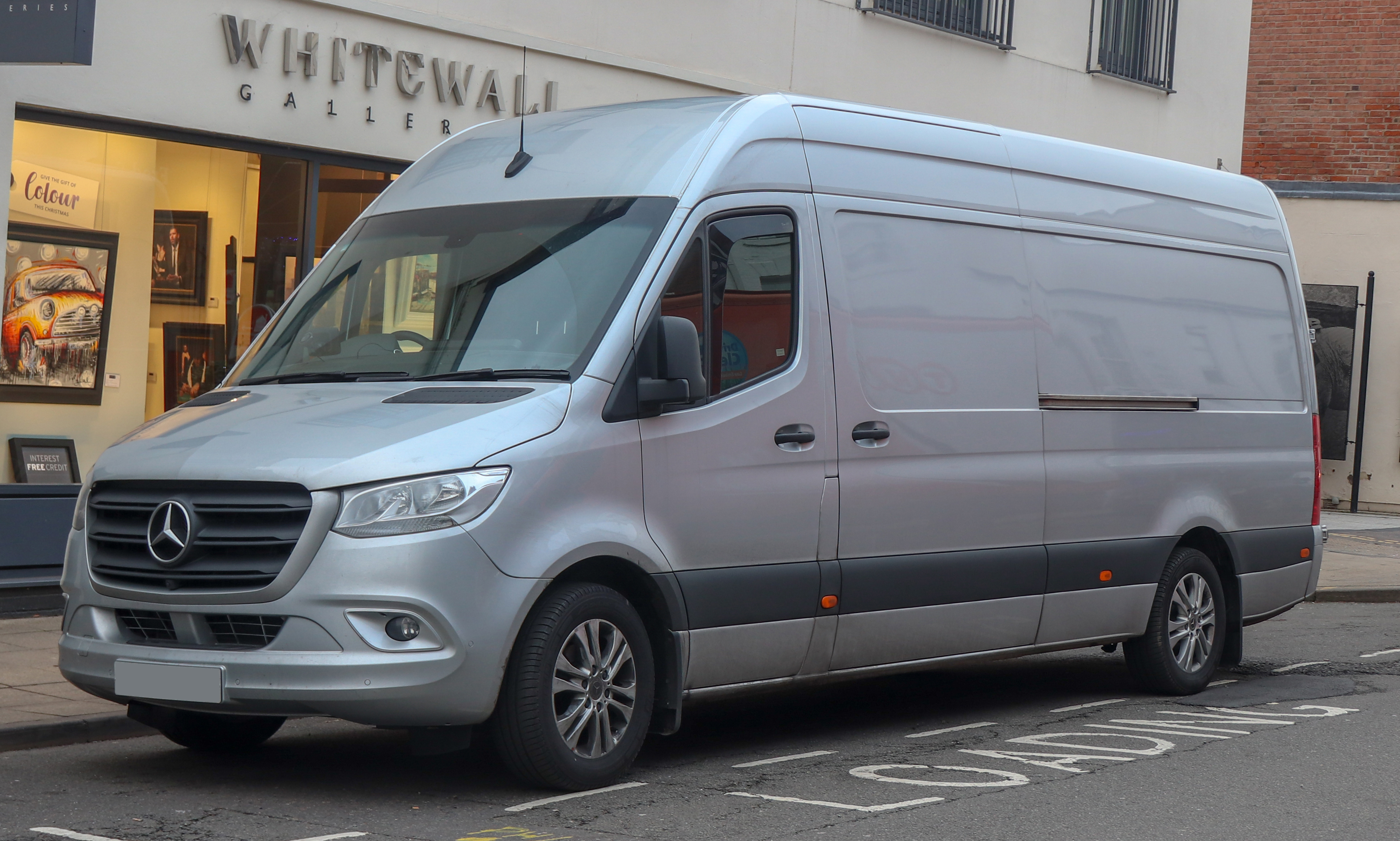
- Third generation Mercedes-Benz Sprinter

Overview
- Also called: Freightliner Sprinter (until 2021)
- Production: 2018–present
- Model years: 2019–present 2019–2021 (Freightliner Sprinter)

Body and chassis
- Body style: 2-door pickup truck 4-door van 4-door minibus
- Layout: FF layout; FR layout; F4 layout; Front-motor front-wheel-drive (Electric; 2018–2023); Rear-motor rear-wheel-drive (Electric; 2023–present)
- Platform: Mercedes-Benz VS30
- Chassis: Unibody

Powertrain
- Engine: Petrol; 2.0L M274 turbo I4; Diesel; 2.0L OM654 turbo I4; 2.1L OM651 turbo I4 (until 2022); 3.0L OM642 DE30LA turbo V6 (until 2022)
- Electric motor: EM6000 Permanent Magnet motor (eSprinter)
- Power output: 116 horsepower (87 kW; 118 PS) (11 Series); 141 horsepower (105 kW; 143 PS) (14 Series); 147 horsepower (110 kW; 149 PS) (15 Series); 161 horsepower (120 kW; 163 PS) (16 Series); 168 horsepower (125 kW; 170 PS) (17 Series); 188 horsepower (140 kW; 191 PS) (19 Series); 116 horsepower (87 kW; 118 PS) (eSprinter); 201 horsepower (150 kW; 204 PS) (eSprinter 2.0)
- Transmission: 6-speed ECO Gear 480 manual; 6-speed automatic; 7-speed 7G-TRONIC PLUS automatic; 9-speed 9G-TRONIC automatic
- Battery: 47 or 55 kWh high-voltage battery (eSprinter 1.0); 113 kWh LFP (eSprinter 2.0)

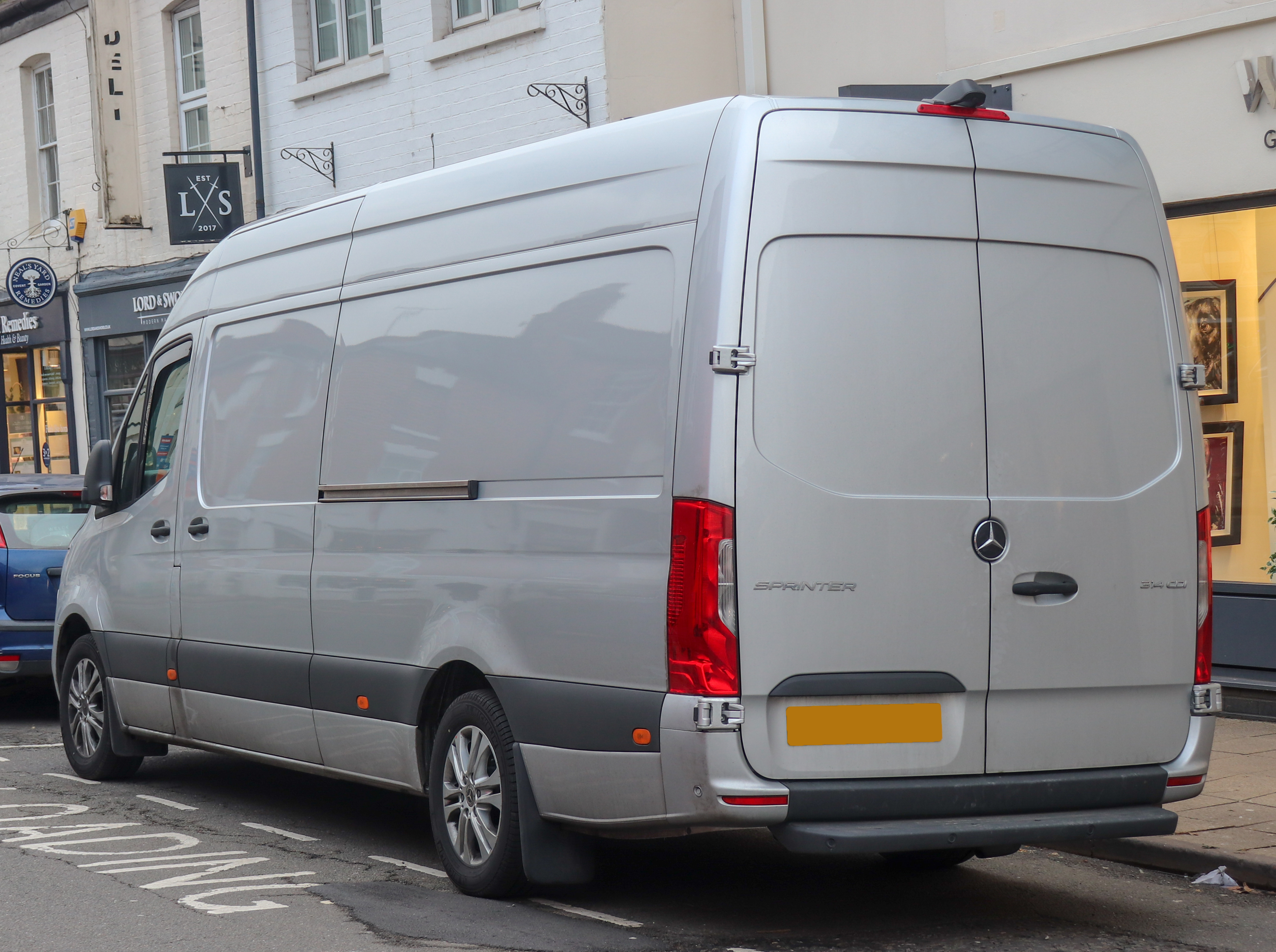
Rear

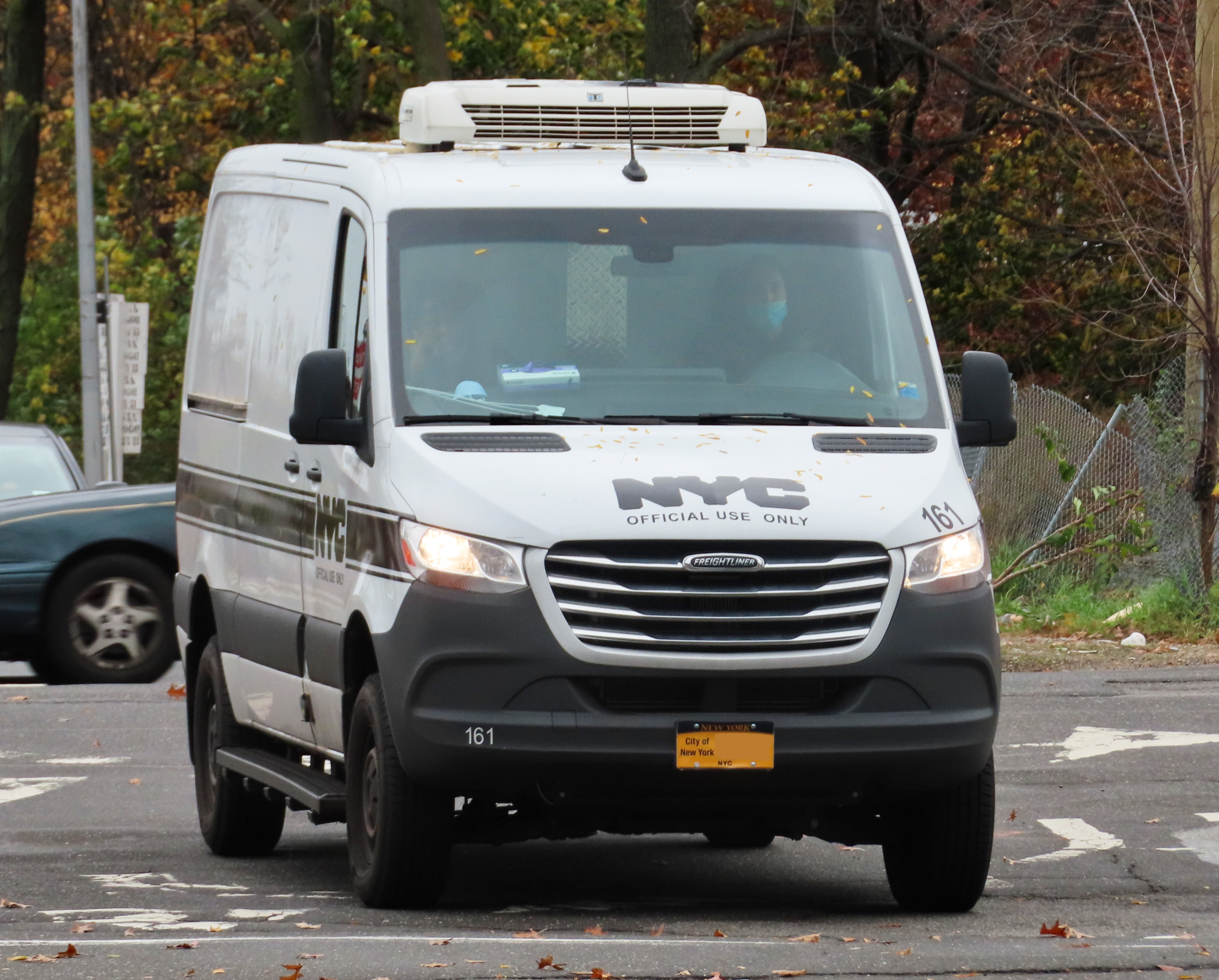
Freightliner Sprinter

The third-generation Sprinter debuted on 6 February 2018, at the Mercedes-Benz logistics center in Duisburg and was available to purchase from June 2018. It is the first generation to include a front-wheel-drive van in the line-up. A new range of standard and optional technology and comfort features were made available. A new gasoline model was also introduced, using the M274 turbo 4 cylinder powerplant, however gasoline models were later discontinued in 2024.

To prepare for the third-generation van, in 2015, Mercedes-Benz Vans decided to switch North American Sprinter production to complete knock-down kit (CKD) assembly, kicking off an expansion of the Ladson factory in 2016, and the first Ladson-built Sprinter rolled off the assembly line in September 2018. The Freightliner version was discontinued after the 2021 model year as part of the Daimler Truck divestment in the Freightliner brand in October 2021.

The third generation Sprinter was updated for the 2023 model year in the U.S., offering a new, all-time all-wheel-drive option with retirement of the selectable "4×4" option; additionally, a 2.0L 4-cylinder OM654 engine replaced the previous diesel engines with standard and high-output tunings offered. Power steering was updated to electromechanical from hydraulic.

In Spring 2024 the European market front wheel drive variant (designation 910) that had been available from the third generation launch was discontinued. Front wheel drive Sprinters can be visually distinguished by their unique wheelbase which is different to all others (see how the rear wheels are pushed closer to the rear bumper).

=== eSprinter ===
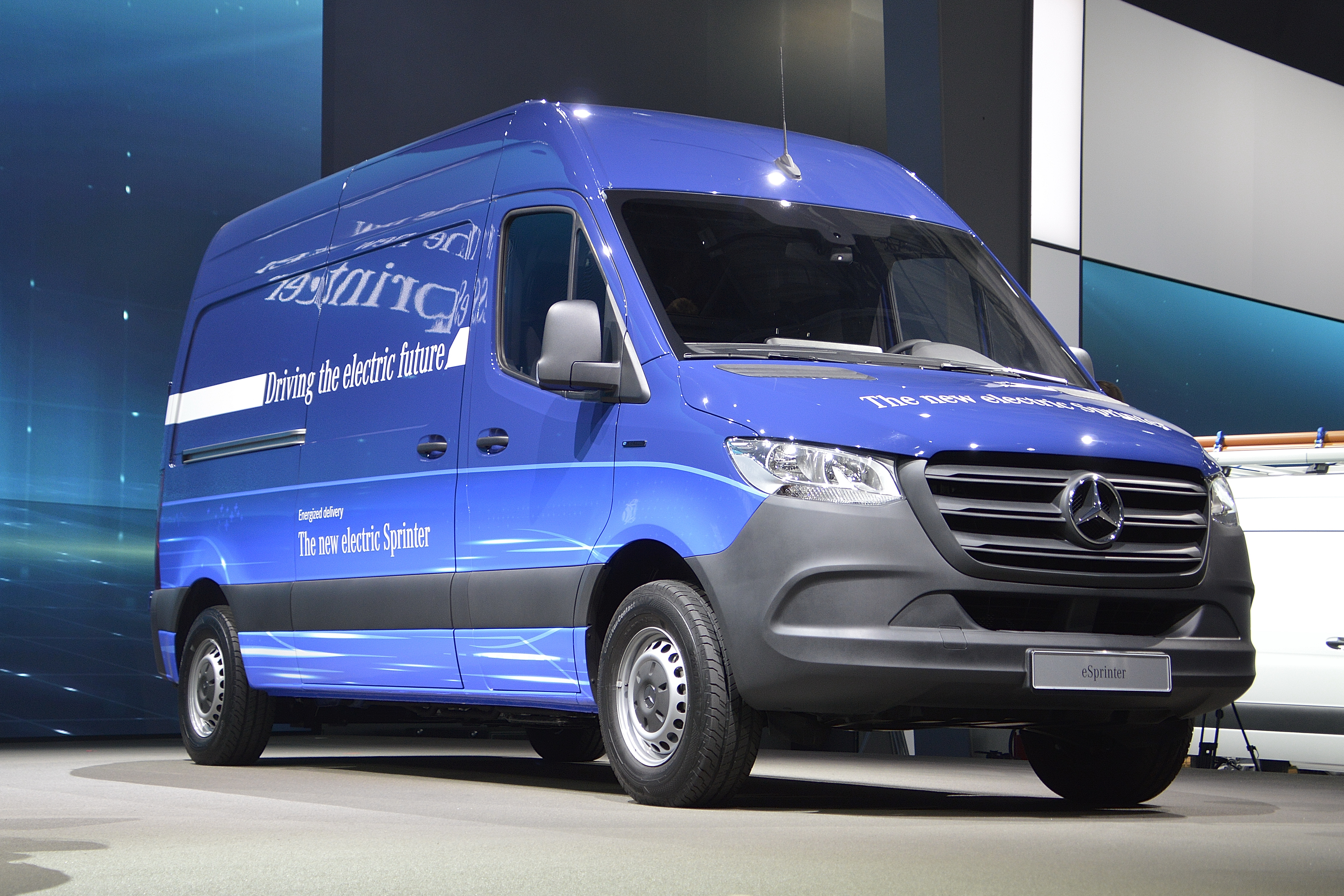
eSprinter (previewed in 2018)

==== eSprinter 1.0 (2019-2023) ====
The first variant of the eSprinter (replaced in 2023 by the new variant) was announced in February 2018. It is a large battery-electric van based on the third-generation Sprinter with a unique front-wheel drive chassis; production of the eSprinter commenced at Düsseldorf in December 2019 for European markets. It is equipped with one of two batteries, with a usable/gross battery capacity of 35/41 (3 modules) or 47/55 kW-hr (4 modules), and is driven by an electric traction motor with an output of 85 kW (114 hp) and 295 N⋅m (218 lbf⋅ft). Initially, it was available exclusively as a high-roof panel van with a cargo capacity of 10.5 m^{3} (370 cu ft).

Winter endurance testing under arctic conditions reduced range to 100 km (62 mi). The production vehicles have an estimated range of 115 or 168 km (71 or 104 mi) for the 41 or 55 kW-hr batteries, giving an energy consumption of 32.5 or 37.1 kWh/100 km (64.4 or 56.5 mpg‑e; 0.523 or 0.597 kW⋅h/mi), respectively, under Directive 692/2008/EC test requirements. The gross vehicle weight rating is 3,500 kg (7,700 lb); given the maximum payload is 891 or 1,040 kg (1,964 or 2,293 lb) for the 55 or 41 kW-hr battery, respectively, the kerb weight is 2,360–2,609 kg (5,203–5,752 lb), and a single battery module is estimated to weigh 250 kg (550 lb).

==== eSprinter 2.0 (2023) ====
One year after eSprinter production started, Mercedes-Benz announced its successor in December 2020. The second-generation eSprinter 2.0 will be released in late 2023. It is based on the Mercedes-Benz "Electric Versatility Platform" (EVP), a bespoke chassis designed for large vans; EVP shifts the traction motor to the rear axle and enables Mercedes-Benz to offer variants, including pickup truck, chassis cab, and cutaway versions. Three different battery capacities will be available, as Mercedes is aiming to double the range of the Europe-only first generation eSprinter. Production is scheduled to start in the second half of 2023 at the three Sprinter factories: Ladson; Düsseldorf; and Ludwigsfelde.

In October 2022, a preproduction extra-long, high-roof eSprinter 2.0 was driven for 295 mi (475 km) on a single charge, taking a roundtrip journey from the Mercedes-Benz Museum to the Munich Airport and back. The computed energy consumption was 21.9 kWh/100 km (96 mpg‑e; 0.352 kW⋅h/mi) and the eSprinter indicated there were 20 km (12 mi) of range remaining when the trip was completed, giving an estimated usable battery capacity of 108.5 kW-hr.

The new eSprinter, with specifications announced in 2023, is now available in both North America and Europe. In North America it is designated as the 2024 eSprinter, and is manufactured in South Carolina. Meanwhile, vehicles for the European market are manufactured at two facilities in Germany. The usable battery capacity is 113.0 kWh. Customers can also choose a smaller-battery version with 81.0 kWh of capacity. The power output is 134 hp (standard) or 201 hp (option).

=== Dimensions ===
Key Sprinter (3rd generation) dimensions
Length Height				Standard		Long	Extra Long
Length Height				Exterior	5,931 mm (233.5 in)	6,967 mm (274.3 in)	7,366 mm (290.0 in)
Length Height				WB	3,658 mm (144 in)	4,318 mm (170 in)	
Length Height				Interior (Note: Interior width is 1,788 mm (70.4 in) for all versions)	3,376 mm (132.9 in)	4,409 mm (173.6 in)	4,811 mm (189.4 in)
Standard	Exterior	Interior	Volume (SRW) (Note: Single rear-wheel models, cargo width is 1,349 mm (53.1 in) between the internal wheel arches)	9.0 m^{3} (319.0 ft^{3})		N/A	
Standard	2,446 mm (96.3 in)	1,720 mm (67.7 in)	Volume (SRW)	9.0 m^{3} (319.0 ft^{3})		N/A	
Standard	2,446 mm (96.3 in)	1,720 mm (67.7 in)	Volume (DRW) (Note: Dual rear-wheel models, cargo width is 978 mm (38.5 in) between the internal wheel arches)	6.3 m^{3} (222.5 ft^{3})		N/A	
High	2,718–2,817 mm (107.0–110.9 in)	2,009 mm (79.1 in)	Volume (SRW)	10.6 m^{3} (374.3 ft^{3})		13.8 m^{3} (488.1 ft^{3})	15.1 m^{3} (532.6 ft^{3})
High	2,718–2,817 mm (107.0–110.9 in)	2,009 mm (79.1 in)	Volume (DRW)	9.3 m^{3} (328.5 ft^{3})		12.2 m^{3} (430.1 ft^{3})	13.3 m^{3} (469.4 ft^{3})
High	2,718–2,817 mm (107.0–110.9 in)	2,009 mm (79.1 in)	Volume (SSW) (Note: Super single rear-wheel models, cargo width is 1,229 mm (48.4 in) between the internal wheel arches)	10.1 m^{3} (358.4 ft^{3})		13.3 m^{3} (469.2 ft^{3})	14.5 m^{3} (512.1 ft^{3})

=== Safety ===
ANCAP test results Mercedes-Benz Sprinter (2024)
Overall
Grading:	89% (Platinum)

ANCAP test results Mercedes-Benz eSprinter (2024)
Overall
Grading:	89% (Platinum)

Euro NCAP test results Mercedes-Benz Sprinter (2025)
Test	Score
Overall:	5 /5 stars
Safe driving	75%
Crash avoidance	89%
Post crash	80%

== Uses ==
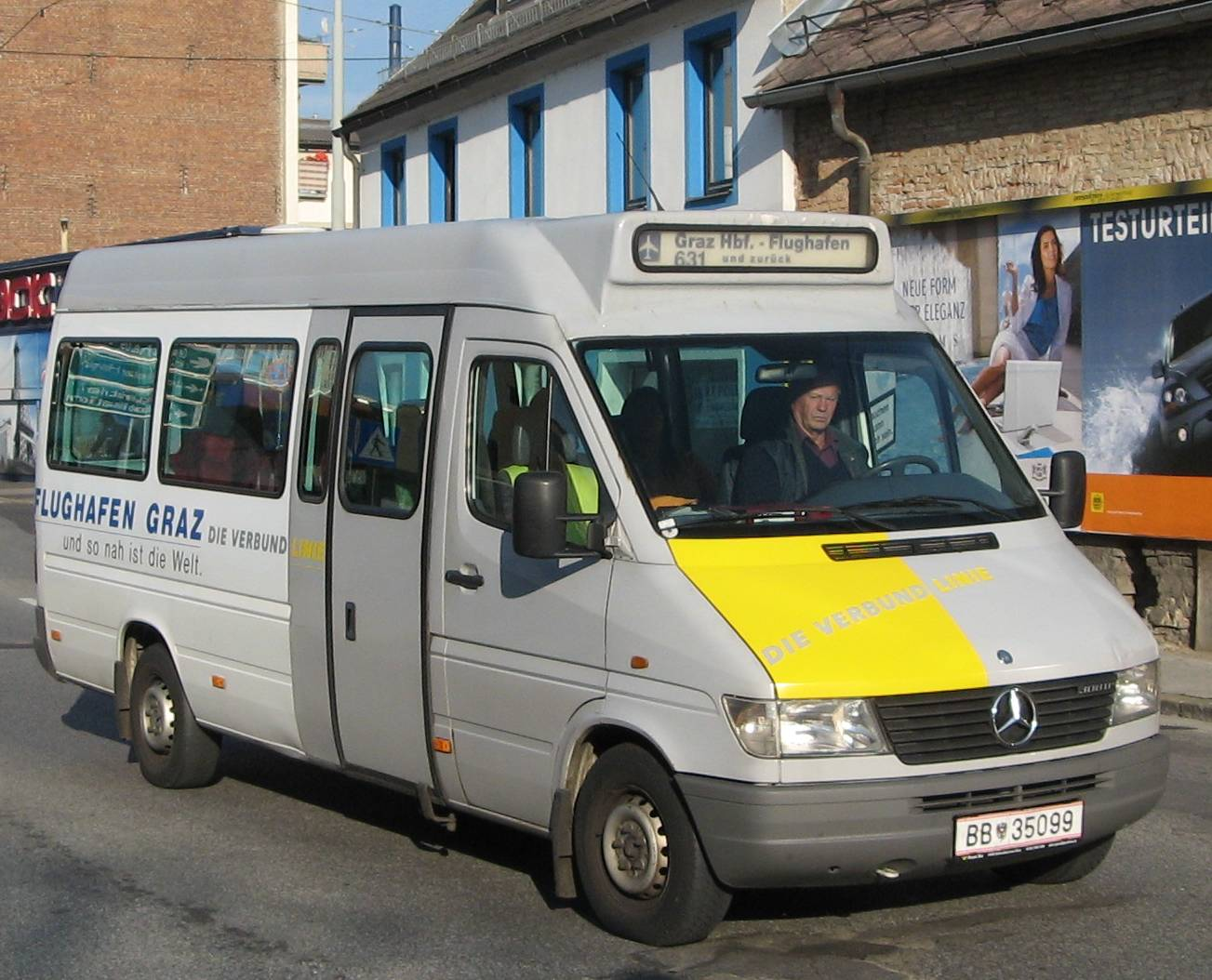
A model 308 D adapted for use as a postbus in Austria

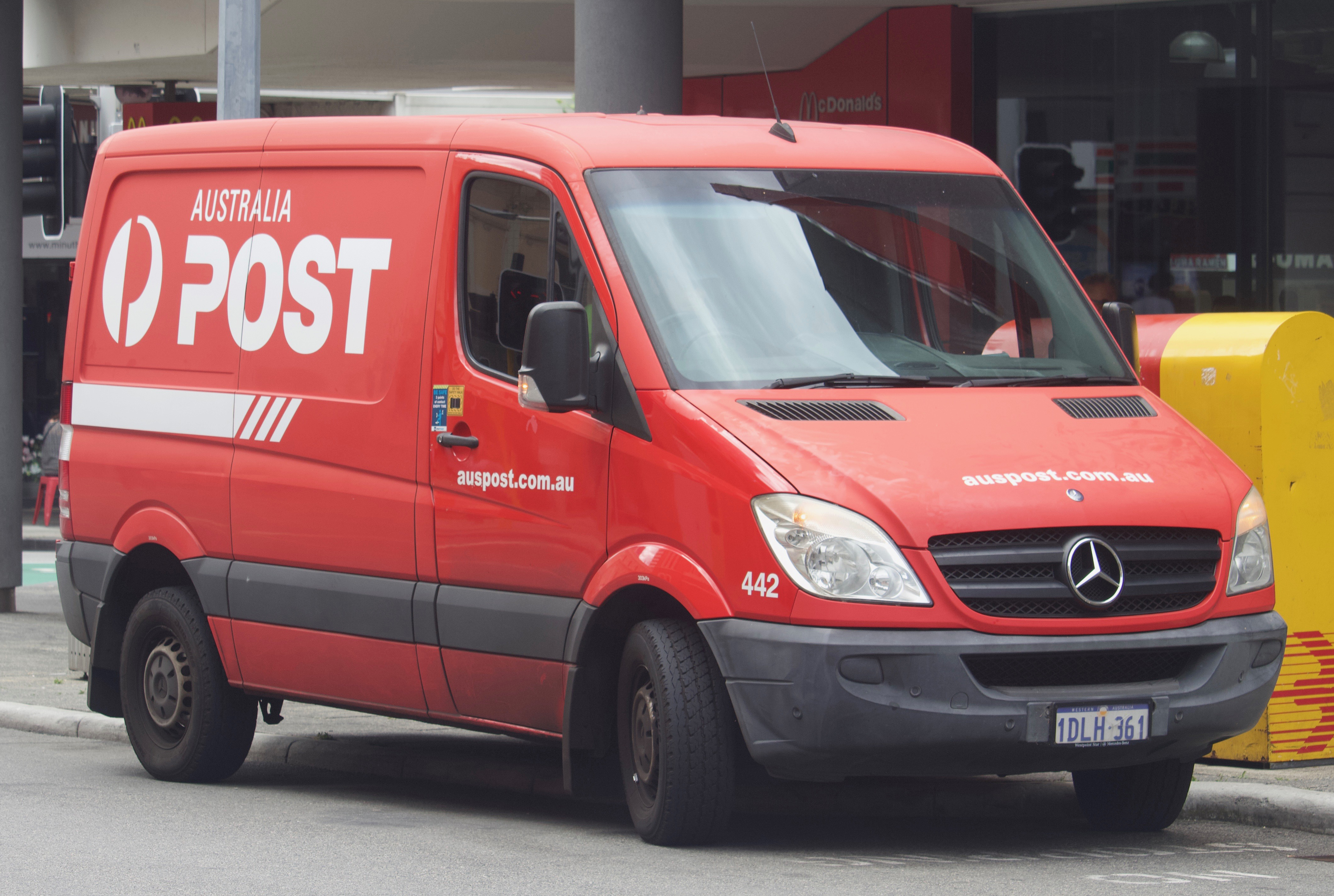
Sprinter (2nd generation pre-facelift) used as a Australia Post delivery vehicle

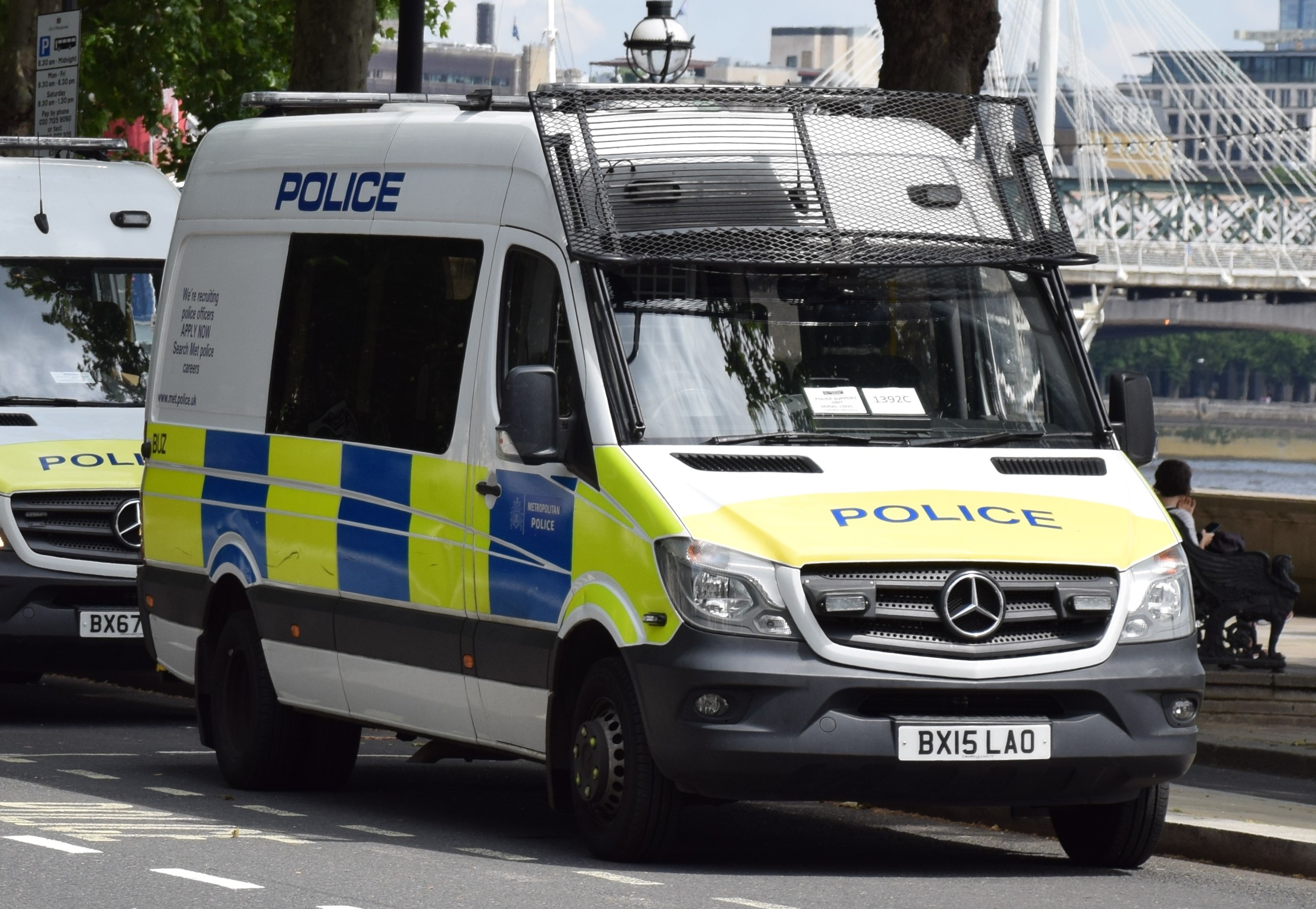
Sprinter (2nd generation facelift) used as a police van with the Metropolitan Police.

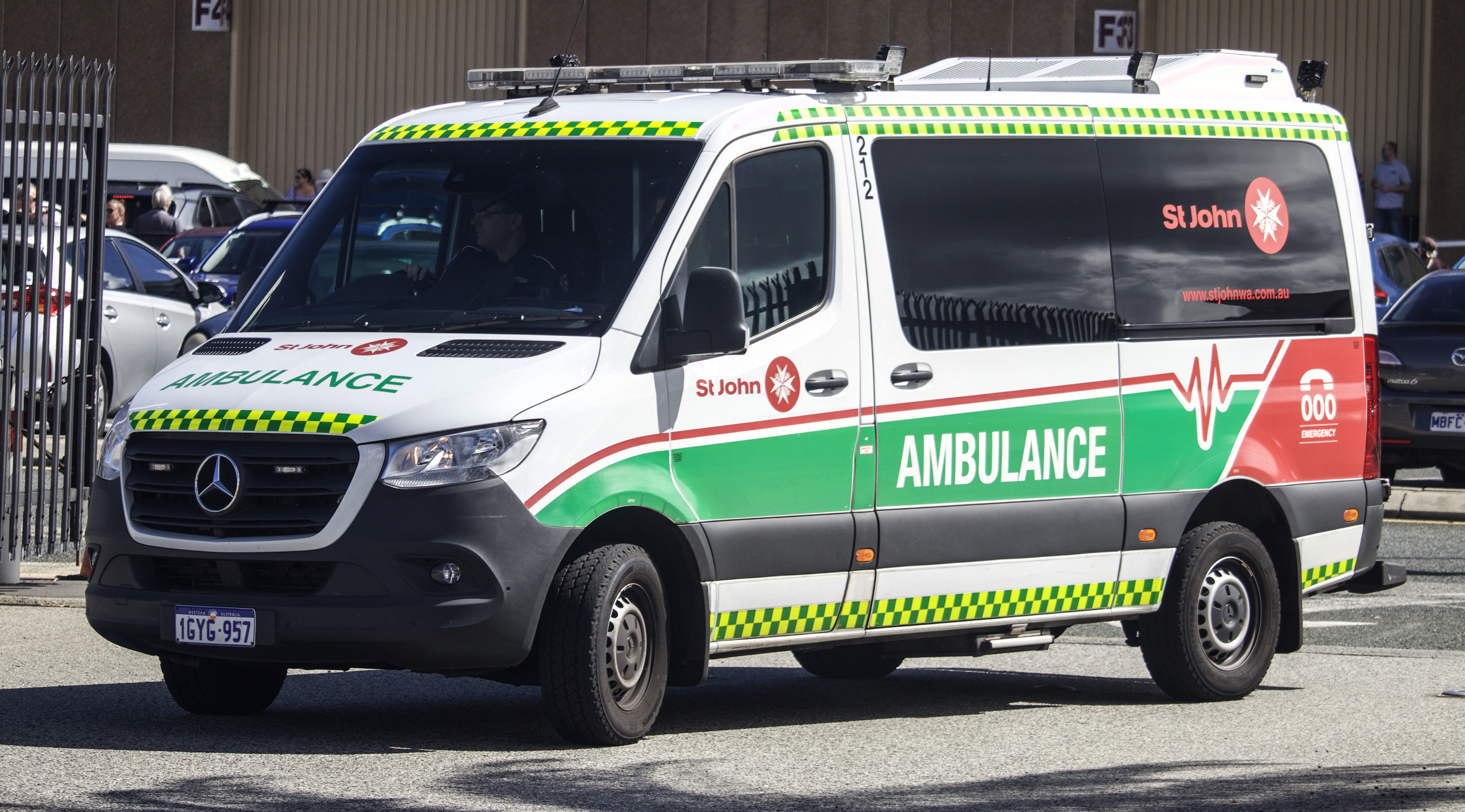
Sprinter used as a St John Ambulance Western Australia vehicle

The Sprinter is designed primarily for business, not private users, although recreational vehicle (RV) conversions are available. In the United States, the first generation Sprinters (2001–2006) were offered solely with the Mercedes-Benz 2.7 litre straight 5 cylinder turbocharged Diesel.

Companies are replacing van conversions with wide bus bodies—Sprinters with side-facing benches and tall right-side doors—as campus shuttles. Limited numbers of complete "wagons" (passenger vans) are being produced in Germany and shipped complete to the United States mostly for personal and church van uses. Typical Sprinter wagons accommodate 8 to 10 passengers and have glass in all possible factory positions. Vans shipped to the United States on-spec (speculation to sell by dealer/distributor) are mostly sent in Arctic White color, but many colors are available. The Dodge dealer network for Sprinters is limited to certified locations (known as "Business Link" certified dealers, usually only awarded to "Five Star" certified dealers), and dealer knowledge is still limited in both sales and service. Special orders typically take one to three months for delivery, and may take even longer due to the assembly and disassembly in Germany, and exporting parts to South Carolina for re-assembly. The exception is passenger van models which are assembled in Germany and exported as complete vehicles. This is because of the United States Chicken Tax. As an unintended consequence, several importers of light trucks have circumvented the tariff via loopholes, known as tariff engineering. Ford, imported its first-generation Transit Connect light trucks as "passenger vehicles" to the U.S. from Turkey, and immediately stripped and shredded portions of their interiors (e.g., installed rear seats, seatbelts) in a warehouse outside Baltimore. To import vans built in Germany, Mercedes-Benz "disassembled them and shipped the pieces to South Carolina, where American workers put them back together in a small kit assembly building." The resulting vehicles emerge as locally manufactured, free from the tariff.

In North America, most Sprinters are sold as cargo vans to expediters in the United States. Such expediters are similar to truck drivers, except they take smaller loads and will wait after unloading until dispatchers find another customer nearby to transport goods. The advent of the Sprinter van with its cargo space of 13.5 ft (4.1 m) has allowed van expediters to take three 48 in × 48 in (1.2 m × 1.2 m) skids or pallets, where previously they were limited to a capacity of two pallets. A Sprinter is capable of hauling approximately 3,000 lb (1,400 kg) of cargo. The vehicle has been adopted by the police in Hong Kong, United Kingdom and in Poland, and also as an ambulance by countries in Western Europe, Scandinavia, the U.S., Australia, New Zealand and Singapore. The 515 CDI has become a common ambulance for use by the National Health Service (NHS) in the United Kingdom, and the Health Service Executive (HSE) & Dublin Fire Brigade Ambulance Service in the Republic of Ireland.

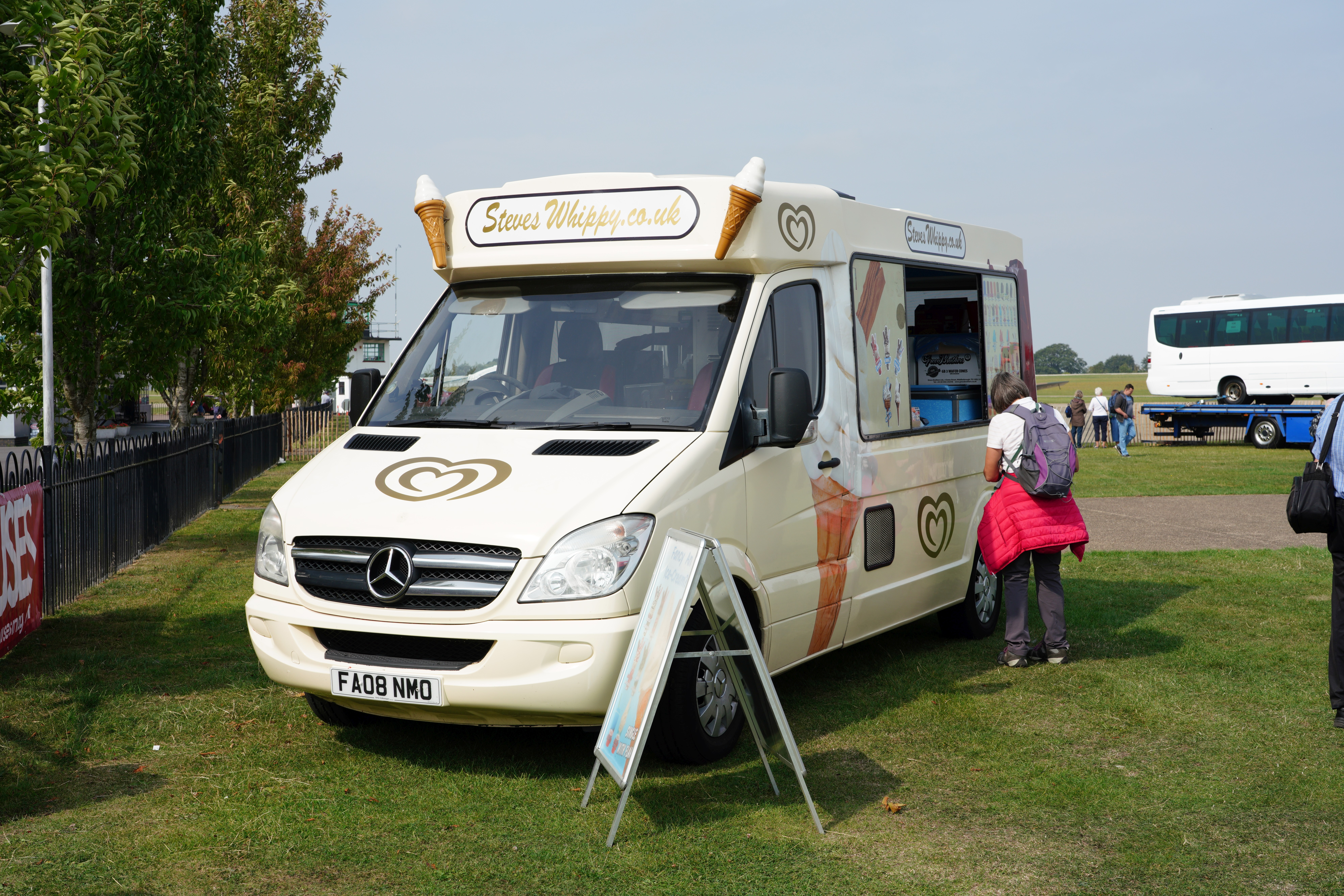
Sprinter used as an ice cream van

Another market in which Sprinters are gaining ground is as van conversions and recreational vehicles. Conversions include RVs, limousines, family and luxury vans, office vans, wheelchair accessible vans and golf vans. Sprinter RV conversions can also be called Sprinter campervans. Sprinter conversions have been produced by several RV and coach manufacturers. Chilled box versions of the Sprinter currently make up the majority of the supermarket Home Delivery fleet across the UK, but demand for these vans has begun to decline. ASDA recently announced that its new fleet would be primarily custom IVECO vans, following in the footsteps of Tesco. Ocado & retail partner Morrisons are primarily taking delivery of Ford Transits for their newer fleet. Mercedes are currently working with Waitrose Home Delivery, who currently use chilled LWB HR Sprinters, on a prototype of a new generation home-delivery van, which is currently being used in select stores, aiming to cut emissions, costs and increase time efficiency.

Sprinters have been used globally as television production vehicles, most commonly as ENG (Electronic News Gathering) and SNG (Satellite News Gathering) vehicles. These are a popular choice for local affiliates for their maneuverability in metropolitan areas and the lack of DOT regulations (in the under 10,000 lbs versions).

Despite not being marketed as a family vehicle, a custom-modified Dodge-branded Sprinter was used by the ten-member Gosselin family, the subjects of the TLC reality series Jon & Kate Plus 8.

In Colombia, the Sprinter is the most popular van for intercity transport. The purchase of a luxuriously appointed Sprinter by the son of former President Julio Cesar Turbay, Julio Cesar Turbay Jr. prompted a scandal.

A Mercedes Sprinter was the vehicle used by Mike and Frank on the History Channel reality series American Pickers until Season 6, when it was replaced by a Ford Transit.

The van is also used as a mobile command center by the Garda Síochána which is the national police force of the Republic of Ireland.

A chassis of the Sprinter is also expected to be used for the upcoming Astrovan II which will be made by Airstream to transport Boeing commercial crew astronauts to Cape Canaveral Space Launch Complex 41 where they would board the CST-100 Starliner on their way to the International Space Station.

== Passenger minibuses ==
Although primarily marketed as a goods van, the Sprinter has 5 variants designed to carry passengers. These are made by removing parts of the walls and replacing them with glass window panels.

=== Sprinter Mobility ===
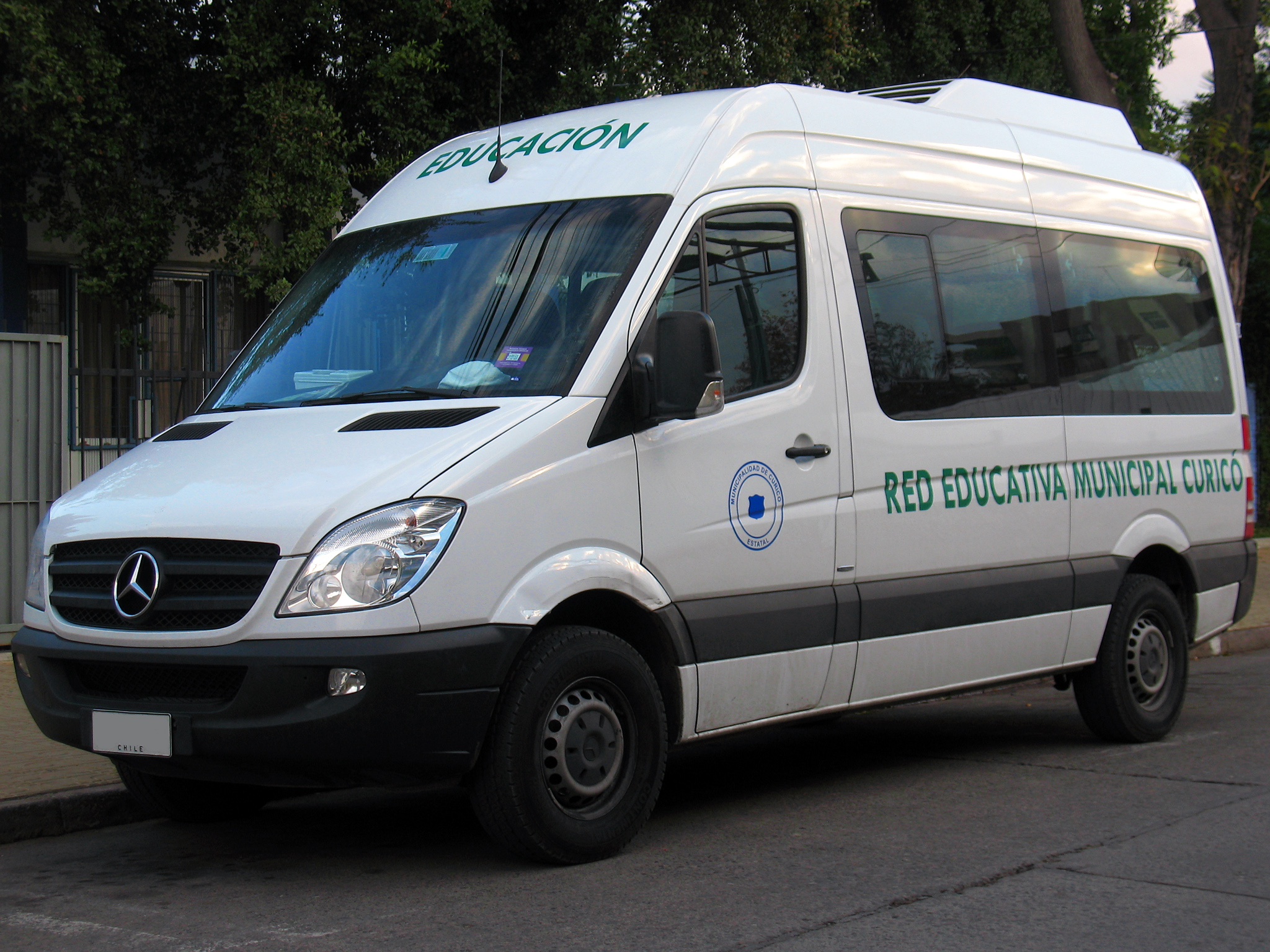
Sprinter Mobility

This is the smallest of the Sprinter minibuses. There are 4 sub-variants: the 23, 33, 35, and 45. It has 8-18 seats and is 6.9-7.4 metres long. It has 4 doors: 1 on either side of the driver and front passenger seats (which, like in a van, are segregated from the main passenger compartment), a sliding door in the middle, which goes into the rear passenger seating area, and a set of double doors at the back going into the disabled area with an elevator that can be extended out of the doors when they are open.

It is designed for paratransit.

=== Sprinter Transfer ===
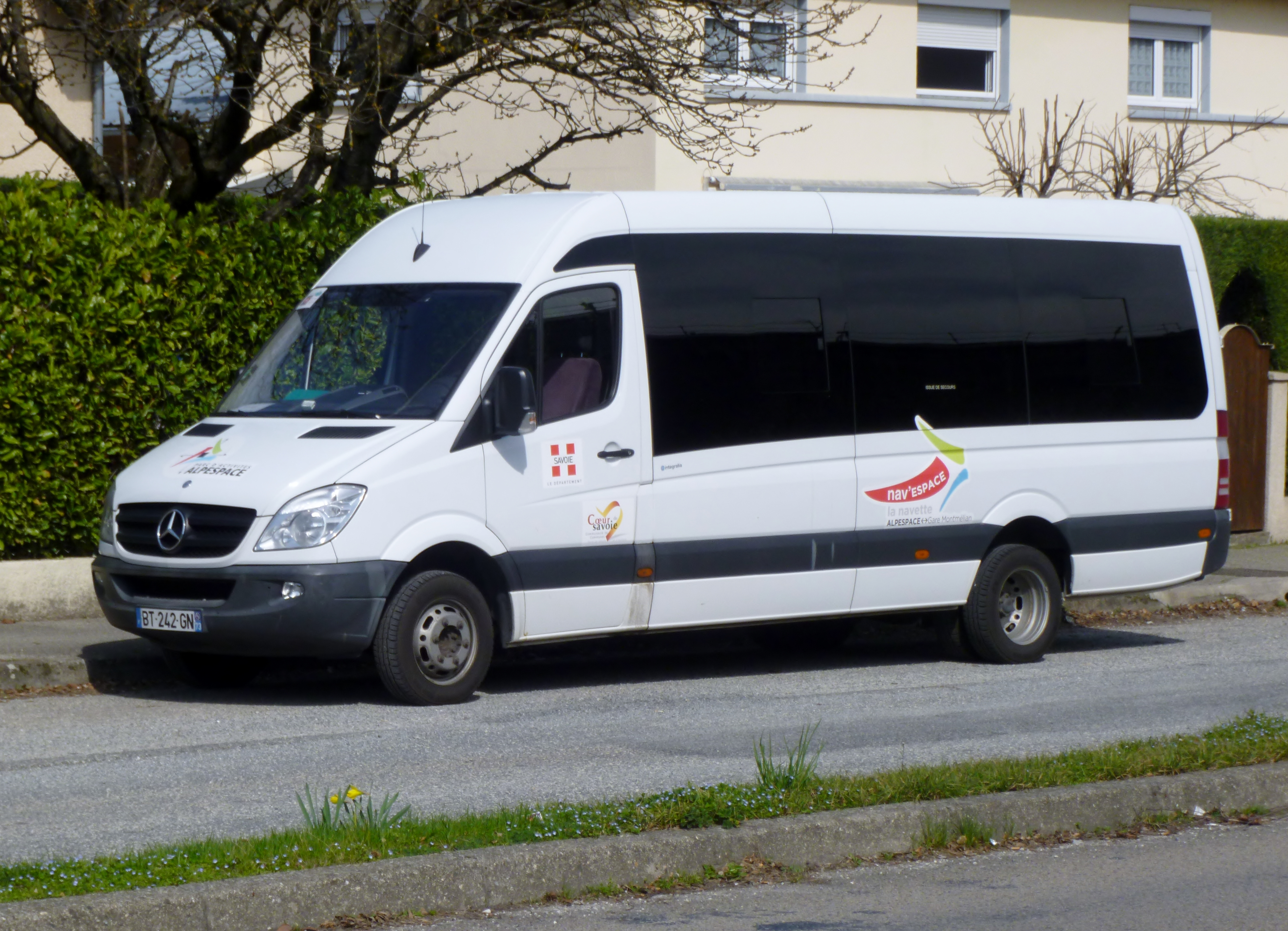
Sprinter Transfer

This minibus is a longer variant of the Sprinter Mobility where the front passenger seat has been removed and the front passenger seat door now acts as the door for all passengers. In addition, the back wall has seats along it, but can be opened as a door and the seats removed to make modifications to the interior of the vehicle. It comes in 5 sub-variants: 23, 34, 35, 45, and 55. It has 13-22 seats and is 5.9-7.7 metres long.

It is designed for bus services to hamlets.

=== Sprinter Travel ===
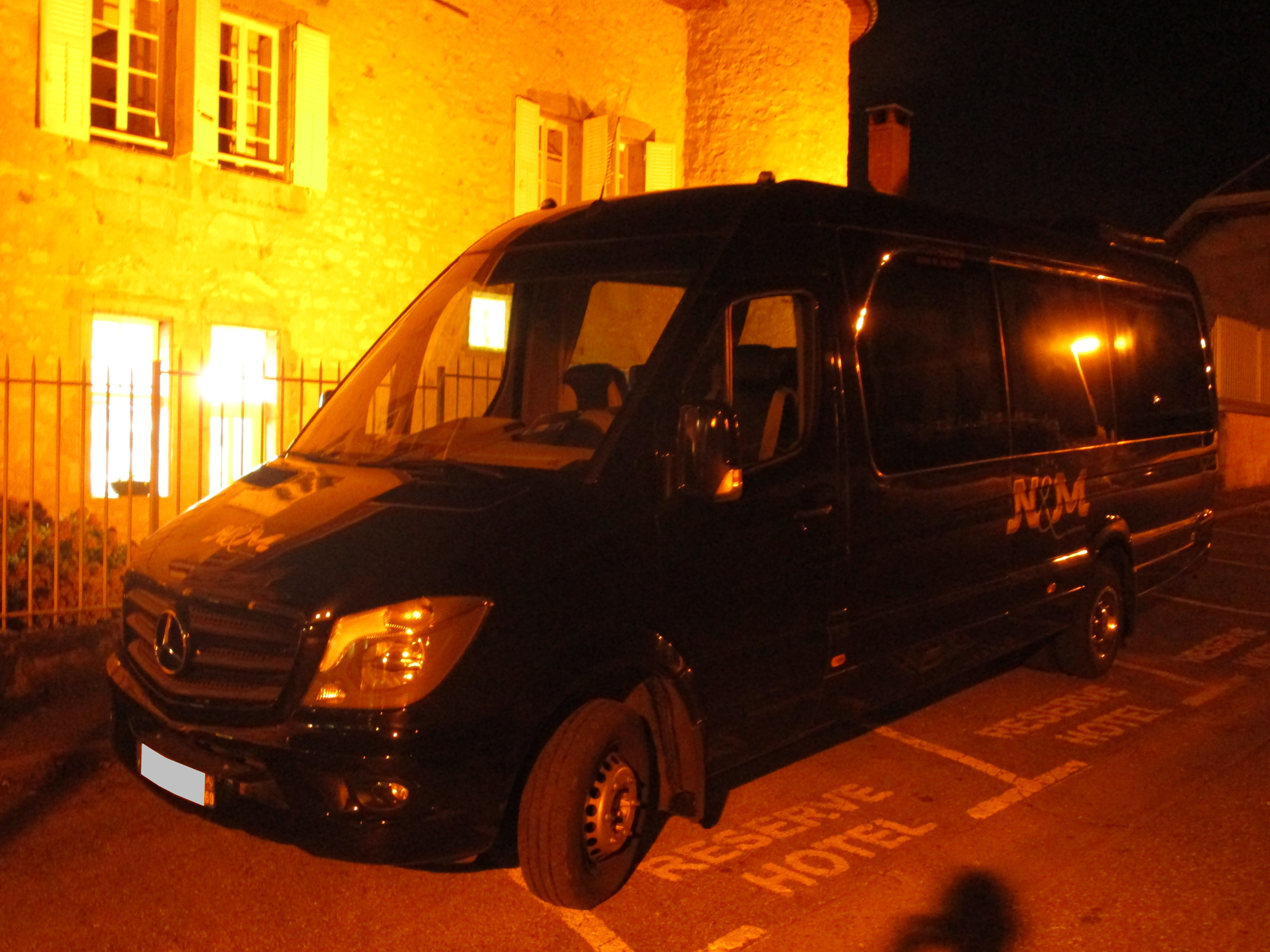
Sprinter Travel

This bus has a high-floor, and in addition to the driver's door, has just 1 automatic passenger door with steps. It is 7.4-7.7 metres long and has 17-19 seats.

It is marketed as a mini-coach.

=== Sprinter Inkanyezi ===
The Sprinter Inkanyezi is marketed in South Africa from 2020s onward as minibus taxi fleet in the country. The car is powered by a 2.0-litre, four-cylinder turbocharged diesel engine and can carry 23 passengers.

=== Sprinter City ===
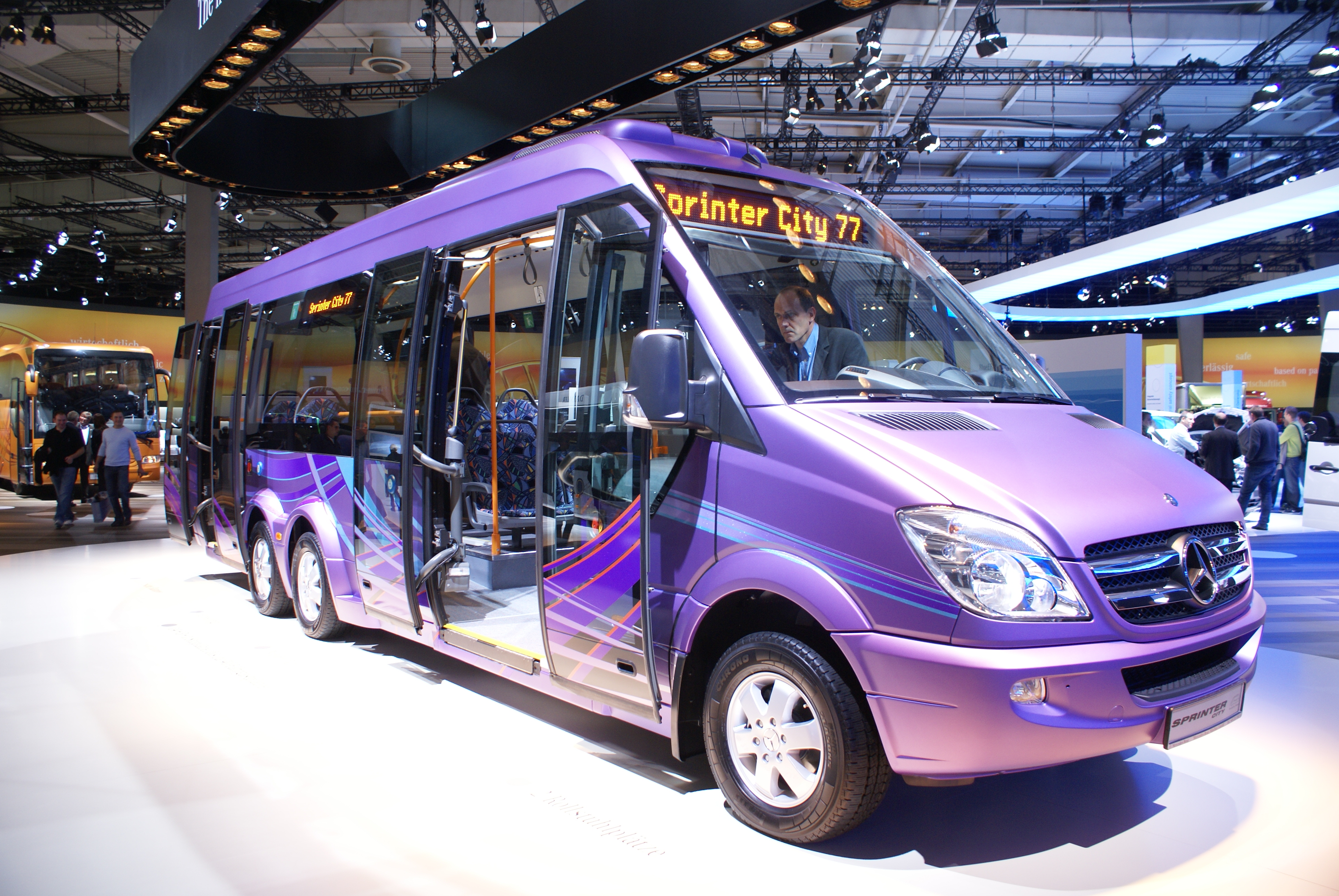
A Mercedes-Benz Sprinter City 77 minibus

The Mercedes-Benz Sprinter City minibus variant began production in 1995 and is marketed through EvoBus. The Freightliner variant was produced starting in 2007. There are three sizes, Sprinter City 35, 65 and 77, which seat from 10 to 16 passengers; including standing passengers, these versions can accommodate 22 to 40 passengers. The 77 variant has a low floor walkway between the front and rear doors, and tandem rear wheels. The Sprinter City has two automatic doors: a set of double doors at the front, used for passengers getting on or off and having a disabled ramp; and a single door behind the rear wheel for passengers alighting, which opens off some stairs in the high-floor area. There is also a manual door on the offside into the driver's cab. The 77 variant has double rear doors.

== Engines ==
The Sprinter is currently offered with I4 and V6 diesel engines; V6 petrol/gasoline; or liquefied petroleum gas (LPG) engines in Europe, Asia, Australia, and South America. In North America, only the six-cylinder 3.0 L turbodiesel and four-cylinder 2.1 L turbo diesel engines are offered.

2,000 electric Sprinters are to be made by VDL Groep from 2016.

=== 2000–2006 (2002–2006 U.S.) ===
Models	Engine Code	Configuration	Displacement	Max. power	Max. torque
208 CDI; 308 CDI; 408 CDI	OM 611	Inline-four 16V DOHC	2,148 cc (131.1 cu in)	82 PS (60 kW; 81 hp)	200 N⋅m (148 lbf⋅ft)
211 CDI; 311 CDI; 411 CDI	OM 611	Inline-four 16V DOHC	2,148 cc (131.1 cu in)	109 PS (80 kW; 108 hp)	270 N⋅m (199 lbf⋅ft)
213 CDI; 313 CDI; 413 CDI	OM 611	Inline-four 16V DOHC	2,148 cc (131.1 cu in)	129 PS (95 kW; 127 hp)	300 N⋅m (221 lbf⋅ft)
216 CDI; 316 CDI; 416 CDI; 616 CDI	OM 612 / OM 647	Inline-five 20V DOHC	2,685 cc (163.8 cu in)	156 PS (115 kW; 154 hp)	330 N⋅m (243 lbf⋅ft)
214; 314; 414	M 111	Inline-four 16V DOHC	2,295 cc (140.0 cu in)	143 PS (105 kW; 141 hp)	210 N⋅m (155 lbf⋅ft)

=== 2006–present (2007–2010 U.S.) ===
Models	Engine Code	Configuration	Displacement	Max. power	Max. torque
209 CDI; 309 CDI; 509 CDI	OM 646	Inline-four 16V DOHC	2,148 cc (131.1 cu in)	88 PS (65 kW; 87 hp)	220 N⋅m (162 lbf⋅ft)
211 CDI; 311 CDI; 411 CDI; 511 CDI	OM 646	Inline-four 16V DOHC	2,148 cc (131.1 cu in)	109 PS (80 kW; 108 hp)	280 N⋅m (207 lbf⋅ft)
213 CDI; 313 CDI	OM 646	Inline-four 16V DOHC	2,148 cc (131.1 cu in)	129 PS (95 kW; 127 hp)	305 N⋅m (225 lbf⋅ft)
215 CDI; 315 CDI; 415 CDI; 515 CDI; 216 CDI; 316 CDI; 516 CDI	OM 646	Inline-four 16V DOHC	2,148 cc (131.1 cu in)	150 PS (110 kW; 148 hp)	330 N⋅m (243 lbf⋅ft)
218 CDI; 318 CDI; 418 CDI; 518 CDI; 319 CDI; 519 CDI	OM 642	V6 24V DOHC	2,987 cc (182.3 cu in)	184 PS (135 kW; 181 hp)	400 N⋅m (295 lbf⋅ft)
224; 324; 424; 524	M 272	V6 24V DOHC	3,498 cc (213.5 cu in)	258 PS (190 kW; 254 hp)	340 N⋅m (251 lbf⋅ft)

=== Limited markets ===
The Maxion/Rover HSD 2.5 L diesel engine was offered in Brazil from 1998 to 2002: model 310D with 95 PS (70 kW; 94 hp) (turbodiesel) and model 312D, with 115 PS (85 kW; 113 hp) (turbodiesel, intercooled).

The Sprinter is also available as the model 316/416/516 NGT using compressed natural gas (CNG) fuel.

An electric hybrid version was tested, but was not officially part of the Sprinter range.
