= Beat (app) =

Peer-to-peer-ridesharing mobile application

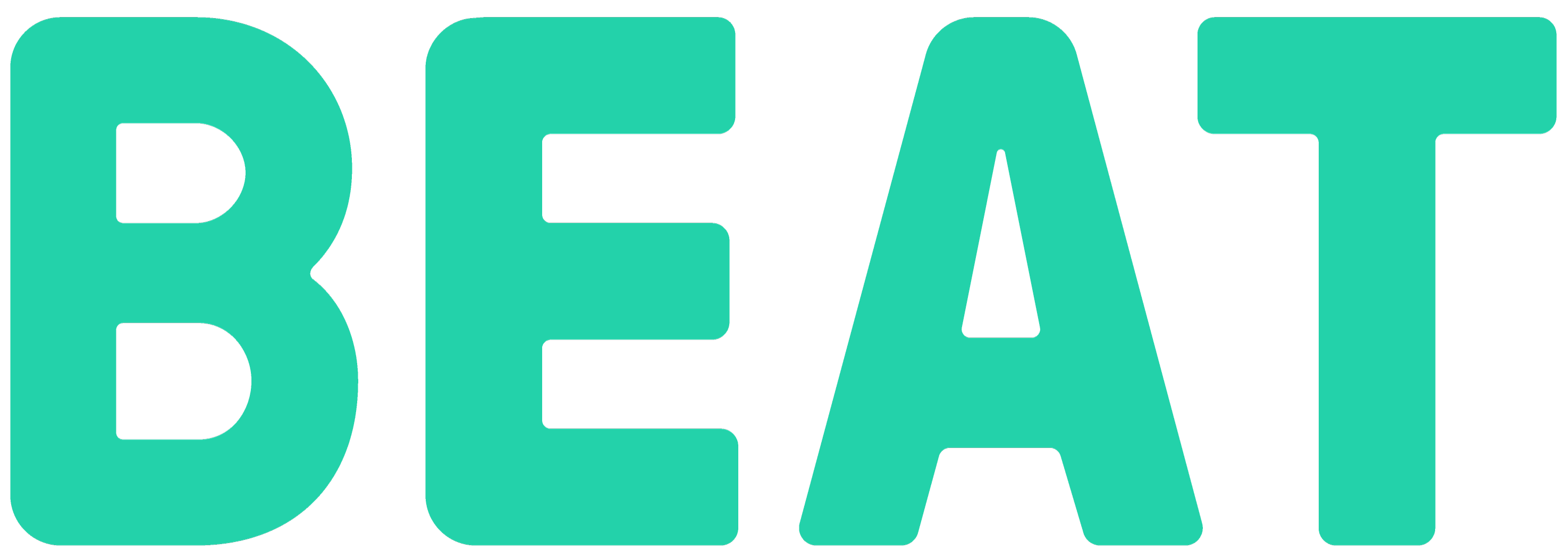
- Type: Private; Ridesharing
- Industry: Transportation; Mobility as a service, Apps, etaxi, Ride-hailing
- Founded: 2011; 15 years ago
- Founders: Nikos Drandakis, Nikos Damilakis
- Defunct: 2022
- Headquarters: Athens, Greece and Amsterdam, Netherlands
- Area served: South America, Greece, Mexico
- Services: Taxi; Package delivery
- Owner: Free Now
- Parent: Mercedes-Benz Group; BMW Group

Beat operated a taxi and ride-hailing mobile app for smartphones and other mobile devices. Beat's headquarters were located in Athens, Greece. About 90 percent of the company’s ride-booking activity was in Latin America, where more than 250,000 drivers work with the app.

Beat ceased operations globally in 2022.

== Background ==
Formerly known as Taxibeat, the company was founded in 2011 by Nikos Drandakis and Nikos Damilakis in collaboration with associates, Kostis Sakkas and Michael Sfictos. The ride-hailing service was acquired by MyTaxi in February 2017, and was soon renamed to Beat. MyTaxi is a subsidiary of the automotive manufacturer Daimler AG.

Today the company is part of the FREE NOW group, the ride-hailing joint venture of BMW and Daimler.
