= Mercedes-Benz Mobility =

Global financial and mobility services provider of Mercedes-Benz Group

Mercedes-Benz Mobility AG
- Company type: Subsidiary
- Industry: Financial & Mobility Services (MaaS)
- Founded: 1990
- Headquarters: Stuttgart, Germany
- Area served: About 40 countries (2018)
- Key people: Franz Reiner (Chairman)
- Services: Auto financing, leasing and insurance Services, fleet management
- Number of employees: 12,912 (2019)
- Parent: Mercedes-Benz Group
- Website: mercedes-benz-mobility.com

Mercedes-Benz Mobility AG (formerly Daimler Financial Services and Daimler Mobility) is the global financial and mobility services provider of Mercedes-Benz Group. The company finances, leases and insures Mercedes-Benz Group passenger cars and commercial vehicles, optimizes fleets of commercial customers and offers banking and credit/debit cards services in more than 40 countries.

Additionally, a key part of today's business is its mobility services with more than 70 million users registered for the company's mobility services.

Mercedes-Benz Mobility is based in Stuttgart, with more than 12,000 employees (2019). The total value of all financing and leasing contracts managed by the company exceeds €154 billion as of 2018.

== See also ==
- Free Now (service)
- car2go
