= Brüngger =

Brüngger is a Swiss surname. Notable people with the surname include:

- Nico Brüngger (born 1988), Swiss cyclist
- Renata Jungo Brüngger (born 1961), Swiss lawyer
