= Manfred Bischoff =

German businessman

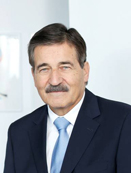
Manfred Bischoff

Manfred Bischoff (born 22 April 1942) is a German businessman who has been the chairman of the supervisory boards of Daimler AG and Mercedes-Benz.

== Early life ==
Bischoff was born on 22 April 1942 in Calw, Germany. He earned a degree in economics and a PhD from Heidelberg University in 1973.

== Career ==
From 2000 until 2007, Bischoff was chairman of EADS.

He was a member of the Daimler supervisory board since 2006, and its chairman from 2007 to 2015. Upon retirement, he was largely credited with the creation of Airbus and EADS by Airbus chairman Denis Ranque.

Bischoff was expected to be replaced by Dieter Zetsche in 2021 until Bernd Pischetsrieder was chosen as his successor instead.

== Other activities ==
=== Corporate boards ===
- Mercedes-Benz, Member of the Supervisory Board (since 2019)
- SMS Group, Member of the Supervisory Board (–2019)
- Airbus, Member of the Board of Directors (–2016)
- Fraport, Member of the Supervisory Board (2002-2012)
- UniCredit, Independent Member of the Board of Directors (2005–2016)
- KPN, Member of the Board of Directors (2003–2013)
- Voith, Member of the Supervisory Board (1999–2014)
- Nortel, Member of the Board of Directors (2004–2009)
- Mitsubishi Motors, Member of the Board of Directors (2000–2004)
- Lagardère Group, Member of the Board of Directors (1998–2005)

=== Non-profit organizations ===
- American Academy in Berlin, Member of the Board of Trustees
- Deutsche Nationalstiftung, Member of the Senate
- German Cancer Research Center (DKFZ), Member of the Advisory Council
- Munich Academy of Fine Arts, Member of the Board of Trustees
- Trilateral Commission, Member of the European Group
- Technical University of Munich, Member of the Board of Trustees (since 1999)

== Controversy ==
In 2007, Bischoff was one of several EADS senior executives who were questioned by the French financial regulator AMF as part of an investigation into alleged insider trading. Bischoff was cleared of any wrong-doing by the AMF.
