= Camille Hearst =

African-American entrepreneur

- Born: San Francisco, California
- Education: Stanford University
- Occupations: entrepreneur and innovator
- Employer: Spotify
- Known for: Prominent leading women of color in the technology and entrepreneurship space
- Notable work: Co-founder and CEO of Kit

Camille Hearst is an African-American entrepreneur and innovator, credited in several online news publications for her decades-long contribution to the technology, social network, digital music service and product design sectors. In addition, she is recognized as a leading woman of color in entrepreneurship. In 2016, she broke barriers as a Women C.E.O. and a founder of color with her startup, Kit.

Raised in San Francisco, Hearst is a graduate of Stanford University, where she studied Engineering. In her early career, she worked for Google, YouTube, Apple iTunes, and Hailo before launching Kit, a social network service. In 2020, after Patreon's acquisition of her startup, Kit, Hearst became GM, head of merchandise and products. Eventually, she left the company and became Head of Spotify for Artists. Hearst resides in SoHo, Manhattan, and continues to be involved in the technology sector.

== Early life and education ==
Stanford Cardinal

Hearst is a native, born and raised in San Francisco, CA, and attended public schools while growing up. According to Ebony magazine's July 2000 article featuring the Top Black High School Seniors across the U.S., Class of 2000, Hearst attended Lowell High School. During her time there, she was a student-athlete, winning the 1989–1999 city champion title in the 300m hurdles track and field event. In addition, Heart was ranked in the top 15% of her graduating senior class. At Lowell, she acted as a mentor for middle school girls living in SF.

Hearst attended Stanford University earning her undergraduate and graduate degrees in Science, Technology, Society/Product Design and Management, and Engineering. While Hearst was studying at Stanford, she was part of the Mayfield Fellows Program, a work/study program that educates students on the conceptual, theoretical, and practical knowledge needed to innovate, lead, scale, and sustain technology startups through an immersive entrepreneurial mindset.

== Career ==
After graduating from Stanford's Engineering school, Hearst started her early career in 2005 as a Product manager for Apple's iTunes division when Steve Jobs was head of Apple Inc., an American multinational technology company headquartered in Cupertino, CA. At the time, iTunes was considered the eighth largest music retailer. Hearst was employed at Apple for several years, and iTunes reached No. 1 when she exited in 2010. Following her five years of employment with Apple, she went on to work for Google, YouTube, and Hailo, a British taxi management app.

In March 2015, Hearst joined Expa Ventures, a New York startup incubator studio that helped conceptualize and develop her first startup, Kit, a social network service for products. She co-founded the social network with Naveen Selvadurai, one of the co-founders of Foursquare and Expa's New York-based partner. In November 2015, Expa named Hearst the first CEO of Kit, a network similar to Pinterest that permitted users to assemble "kits" of their favorite products to share online with other users.

Hearst along with her partner, Selvadurai, were able to raise $2.5M in the seed round from angel and venture investors such as Social Capital, Authentic Ventures, Black Angel Tech Fund, Precursor Ventures, Expa, April Underwood and Ellen Pao. The early funding was used for market research and pathways to a revenue-generating business model. At launch, Kit was integrated with Twitter and Alexa, permitting Kit users to request for product recommendations on the social service platform.

According to Project Diane's yearlong intersectional study performed in 2016, Hearst was considered only the 12th African-American female entrepreneur to fundraise more than $1M in outside capital as part of the fastest-growing entrepreneurial demographic segment in the U.S. The definitive study quantified that Black female entrepreneurs were recorded to own 60 percent of all black small-to-medium startups and enterprises, generating nearly $44 billion annually among the estimated 1.5 million businesses registered in the U.S.

In June 2018, Patreon acquired Kit for its merchandising logistics development with $15 million in gross merchandise revenue to strengthen Patreon's bundle merchandise subscription service. The merger permitted Patreon to stay competitive with social media companies like YouTube and Facebook. In addition, the M&A deal retained ninety percent of Kit's remote New York product and engineering teams.

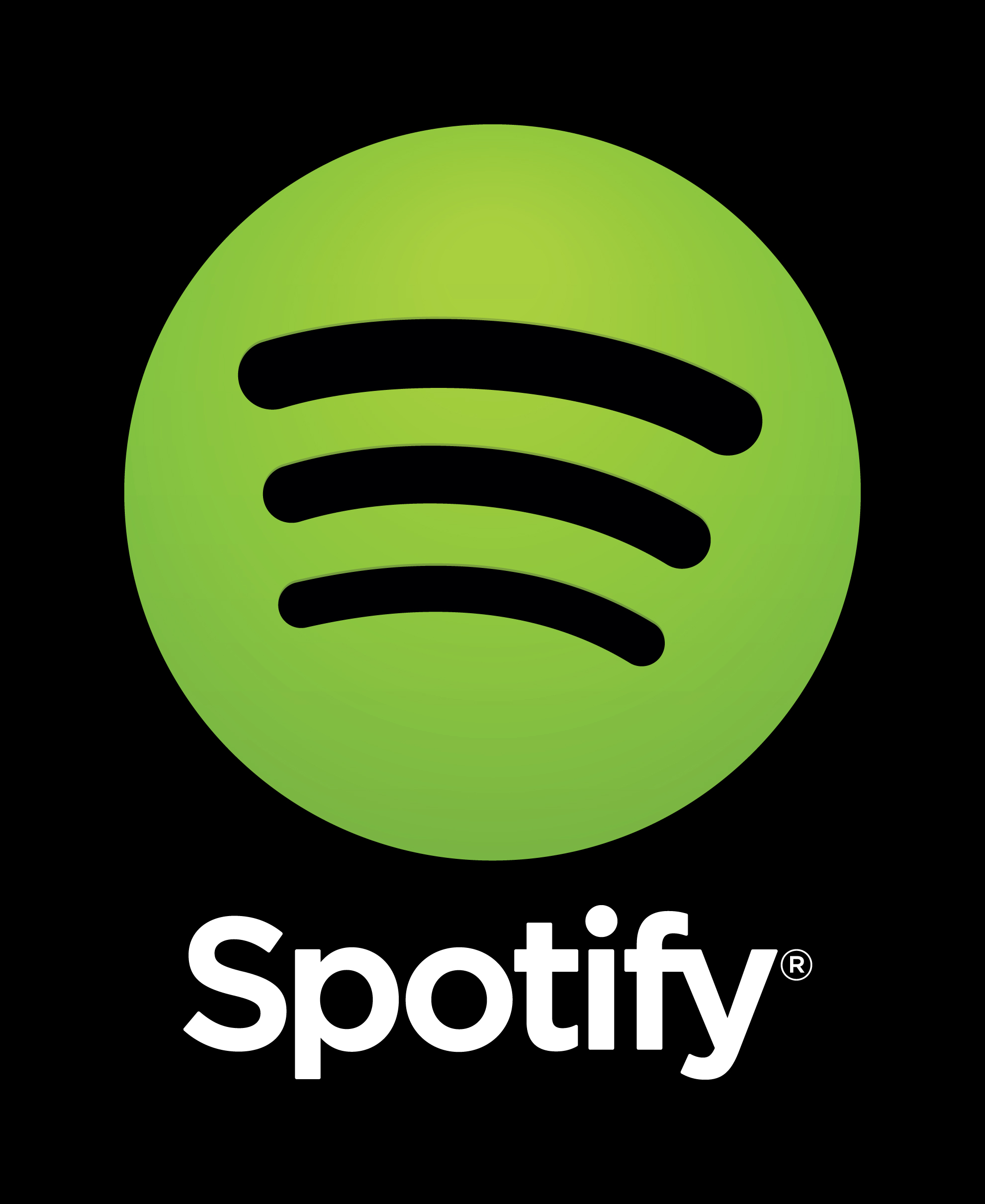
Spotify USA Inc.

After the deal with Patreon, Hearst became the general manager, head of merchandise and products. She left the company in 2020 to take on a new leadership role with Spotify, where she was named head of Spotify for Artists, leading design, product development, engineering, data science, and user experience, managing cross-functional teams at the giant audio streaming service provider.
