= Thomas Weber (engineer) =

German engineer and businessman

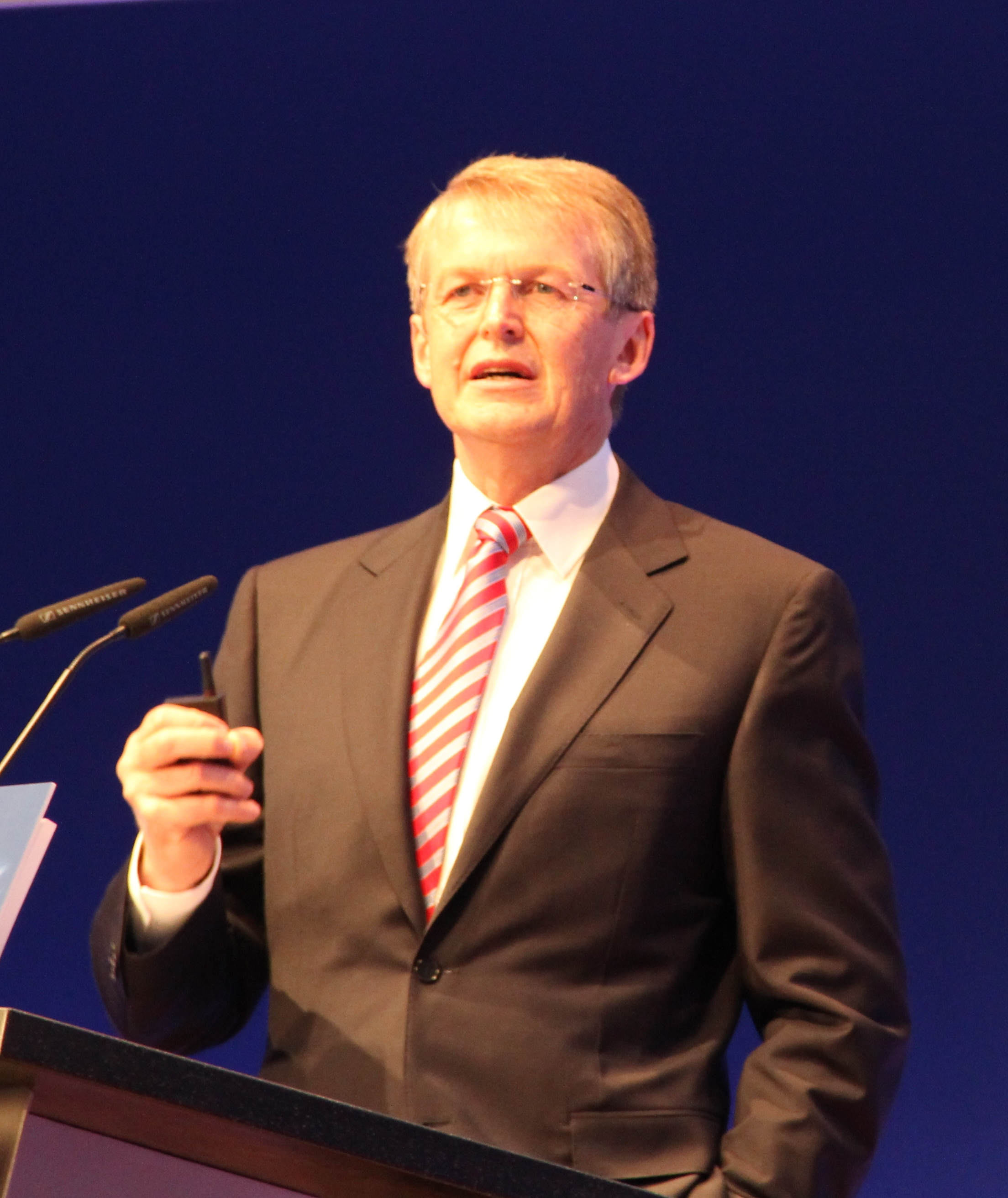
- Thomas Weber at the Electromobility Summit in Berlin 2013.
- Born: May 26, 1954 (age 71)
- Citizenship: German
- Occupation: Engineer

Thomas Weber (born 26 May 1954) is a German engineer and former board member of Daimler AG (now Mercedes-Benz Group). From 2004 to 2016, he was responsible for Group Research and Mercedes-Benz Cars Development.

== Career ==
As of January 1, 2017, Thomas Weber's contract with Daimler AG was not renewed at his own request and he left the Board of Management. His position was filled by the Swedish manager Ola Källenius, who has been a member of the Board of Management of Daimler AG since January 1, 2015, and responsible for Mercedes-Benz Cars Sales.

Weber is a member of the National Electromobility Platform and is committed to the development of electric cars. He is also a senator and vice president at acatech – German Academy of Science and Engineering.
