= Britta Seeger =

German business executive

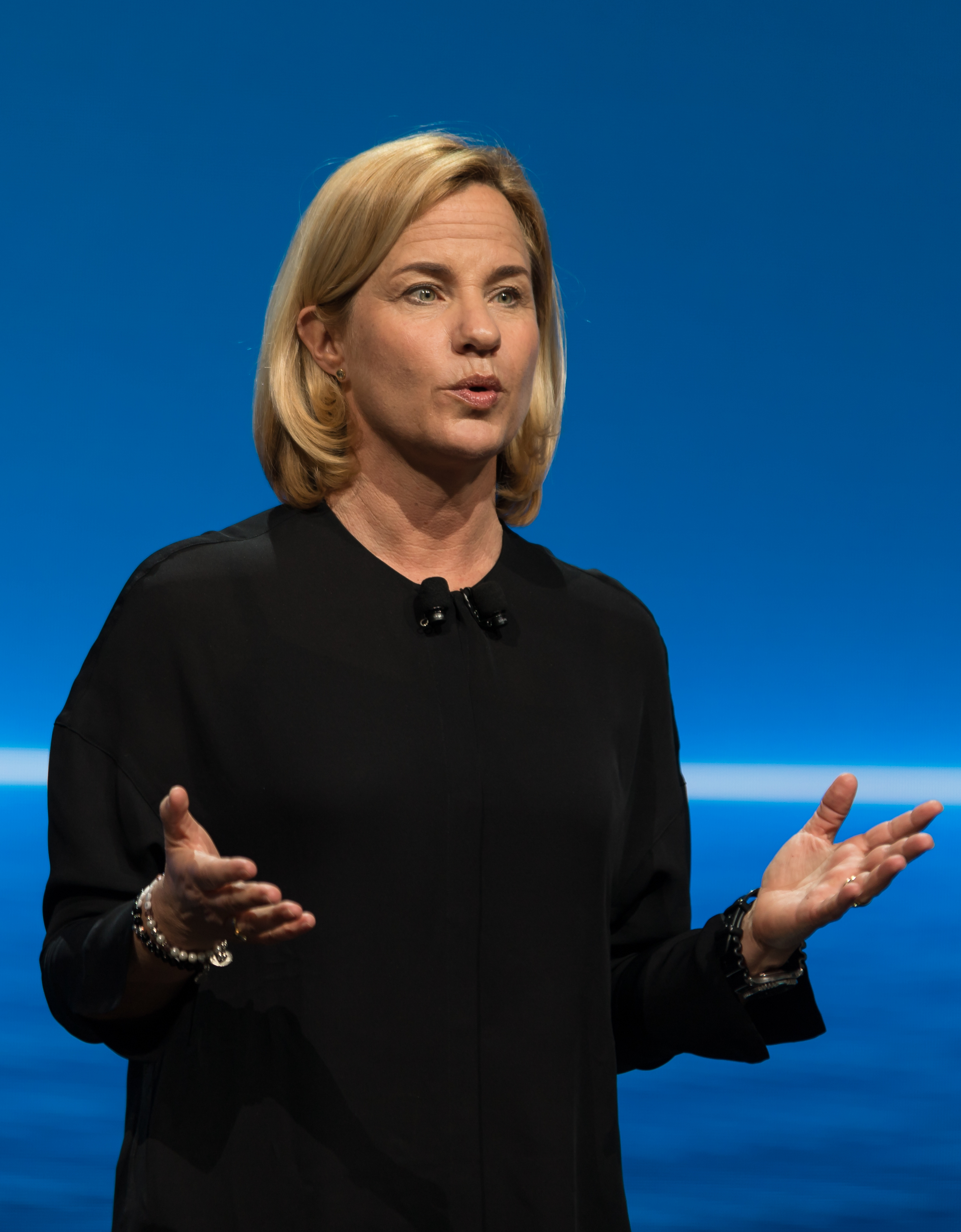
- Seeger at the 2018 Geneva Motor Show
- Born: 25 September 1969 (age 56); Bonn, West Germany
- Occupation: Business executive
- Known for: Daimler AG executive

Britta Seeger (born 25 September 1969) is a German business executive. She is currently the second female member of the Board of Management of Daimler AG alongside Renata Jungo Brüngger and, after her predecessor Christine Hohmann-Dennhardt, the third woman in the history of Daimler AG to be appointed to the Board of Management.

== Early life and education ==
Seeger was born in Bonn, West Germany. After attending the Friedrich-Schiller-Gymnasium in Fellbach, Seeger graduated with a BA in business administration from the University of Cooperative Education in Stuttgart.

== Career ==
Seeger began working at Mercedes in 1989, working in retail and marketing before being named head of the eBusiness Unit in 2000.

After several positions at the corporate headquarters, Seeger switched to the commercial vehicle division in 2013, where she was initially responsible for the South Korean and then for the Turkish market. In South Korea, she was the first woman to hold a management position at a foreign automobile manufacturer.

In 2016, she was named the head of global sales and marketing of Mercedes-Benz (succeeding Ola Källenius), and was appointed to the Group's Executive Board on January 1 2017.

Seeger also holds other positions within Daimler, including board of directors of Mercedes-EQ Formula E Team and Mercedes-Benz Grand Prix.

== Personal life ==
Seeger is mother to triplets.
