= Free Now =

Free Now may refer to:

- "Free Now", a song by Gracie Abrams from The Secret of Us
- "Free Now", a song by Paul McCartney from Liverpool Sound Collage
- "Free Now", a song by Sleeping with Sirens from Feel
- Freenow, a taxi-booking app
