= Ola Källenius =

Swedish business executive (born 1969)

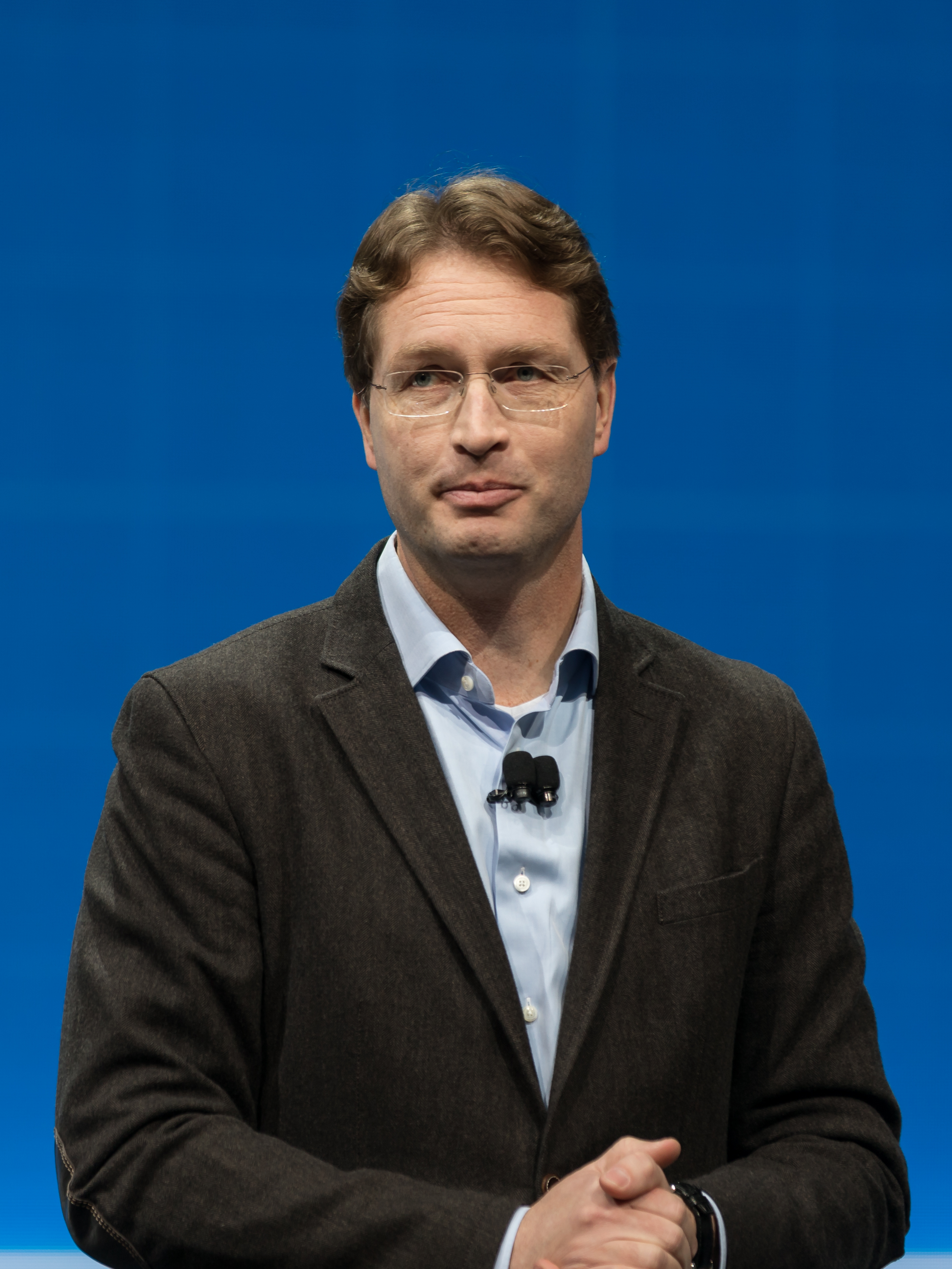
- Källenius in 2018
- Born: Sten Ola Källenius; 11 June 1969 (age 56); Västervik, Sweden
- Education: Stockholm School of Economics
- Title: Chairman of Mercedes-Benz Group, Chief Executive Officer of Mercedes-Benz
- Predecessor: Dieter Zetsche
- Children: 3

Sten Ola Källenius (born 11 June 1969) is a Swedish-German business executive. He serves as the Chairman of the Board of Management and CEO of the Mercedes-Benz Group. Källenius was the first non-German to hold both positions prior to obtaining German citizenship.

== Early life ==
Källenius was born in Västervik, by the age of one the family moved to Malmö, later living in various places throughout Sweden, Germany, and Switzerland. The family spent summers at Scania's countryside, where his father's family owned a summer house next to his maternal grandparent's farm. When Ola was 16, the family moved to Stockholm, living across the road from the Stockholm School of Economics. Before starting university, he completed his military service at Tolkskolan – the Swedish Armed Forces Interpreter School – which he called 'the most intense 15 months of my life'.

== Education ==
Originally planning to follow his older brother's footsteps in studying at KTH, Källenius instead graduated from Stockholm School of Economics with a master's degree, including an exchange semester at University of St. Gallen. He also earned aCEMS Master in International Management (CEMS MIM) and Finance and Accounting.

== Career ==
Källenius began his career in 1993 at the former Daimler-Benz AG, where he worked in the "International Junior Research Group". His first major project was in the finance team for setting up production of the Mercedes M-class at a new Alabama plant. After other early assignments in management control, he assumed various management positions within Daimler AG, including head of the "Powertrain" purchasing department of the Mercedes-Benz Cars group.

In 2003, he became director of operations at McLaren. Two years later he became managing director of Mercedes-Benz High Performance Engines Formula 1 engine factory.

He moved back to the US in 2009, where he would head the US division of Mercedes-Benz. In 2010, he returned to Germany, taking over the chairmanship of the management of Mercedes-AMG GmbH, which he relinquished to Tobias Moers on 1 October 2013. Since October 2013, he has been a member of the executive board of Mercedes-Benz Cars and was responsible for marketing and sales.

He was appointed to the board of management of Daimler AG on 1 January 2015. On 1 January 2017, he took over the management of the "Group Research and Mercedes-Benz Cars Development" division as a member of the executive board. He became the successor to Thomas Weber, who had been responsible for this division since 2004. Britta Seeger succeeded Källenius as board member for Mercedes-Benz Cars Sales.

Källenius succeeded Dieter Zetsche as the Chairman of the Board of Management of Mercedes-Benz Group AG in May 2019. In 2023, Mercedes-Benz extended his contract until mid-2029.

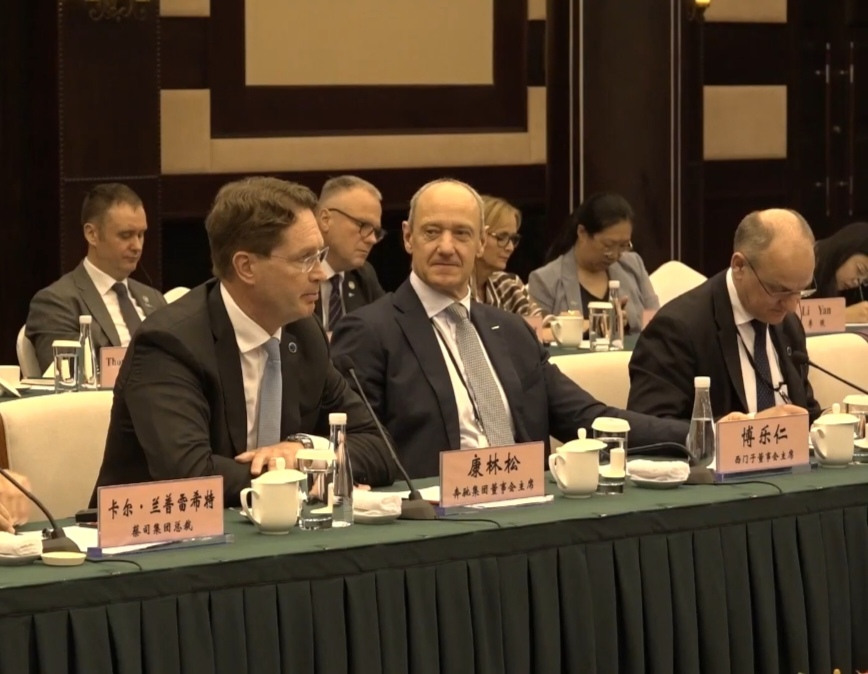
Källenius (left) visit Chongqing, China, 2024

In his capacity as CEO, Källenius accompanied Chancellor Olaf Scholz on a state visit to China in 2024.

== Positions ==
Källenius is a strong advocate of plug-in hybrids and electric vehicles within Daimler. He has pushed the new electric model initiative, product and technology brand EQ, along with a $12 billion investment into Mercedes-Benz's new line of battery-powered vehicles. Within the initiative he has proposed and advocated for a series of ten new and purely electric Mercedes-Benz models to be launched by 2022. The first car was the Mercedes-Benz EQC SUV, launched in the first half of 2019.

== Personal life ==
Källenius is married to Sabine; the couple have three sons. His wife is an environmental activist (part of the Green Globe Organisation) who according to Källenius requested that he transition the entire Mercedes-Benz range, including the flagship G-Wagon, to fully plug-in electric vehicles. In July 2023 Källenius obtained German citizenship. He is fluent in English, Swedish and German.

During his studies at the Stockholm School of Economics, he was a member of the Danderyd Mean Machines American football team.
