= Hailo =

Former British taxi management app

- Industry: Taxi management
- Founded: 2011; 15 years ago in London, United Kingdom
- Founders: Russel Hall; Gary Jackson; Terry Runham; Jay Bregman; Caspar Woolley; Ron Zeghibe
- Fate: Acquired
- Successor: myTaxi
- Headquarters: London; New York City
- Products: Taxi e-hailing marketplace, mobile commerce network
- Website: hailoapp.com

Hailo was a British technology platform that matched taxi drivers and passengers through its mobile phone application. Founded in London in 2011, the Hailo taxi service was available in 16 cities (as of December 2013).

By May 2013, Hailo had enabled more than three million rides for passengers from over 30,000 registered taxi drivers.

The Hailo Passenger App was available as a free download from the App Store and Google Play for both iOS and Android devices.

In late 2016, Hailo was absorbed by myTaxi, a German e-hailing company belonging to Daimler Financial Services, to form the largest e-hailing operator. The resulting company, branded mytaxi, was based in Hamburg.

By July 1, 2019, mytaxi was rebranded to Free Now serving over 100 European cities including Barcelona, Berlin, Dublin, Milan, Paris, and London. Free Now customer care and support teams operate from Dublin, Hamburg, Madrid, Warsaw among other European countries.

== History ==
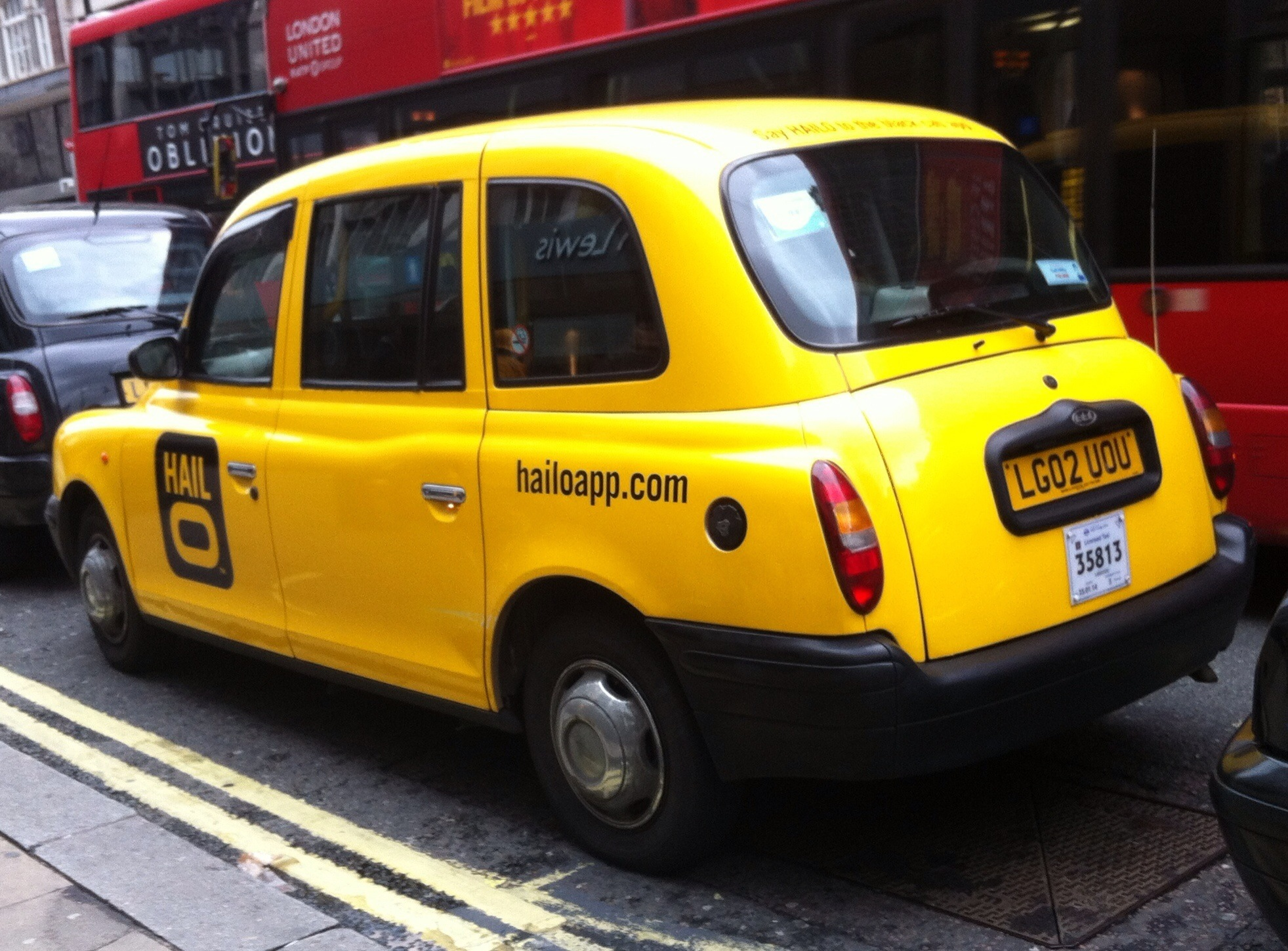
Hailo cab in London

Hailo began in late 2010, after a meeting between three London taxi drivers and three technology entrepreneurs, including founding CEO Jay Bregman.

On 1 November 2011, Hailo officially launched to passengers in London. By the end of 2012, Hailo had launched in Dublin, Boston, Toronto, and Chicago, but by late 2014 had discontinued services in North America.

=== Funding ===
Hailo raised approximately $125.1 million in funding. Hailo received $3.0 million in two tranches of Seed round funding in 2011. In March 2012, Hailo received $17 million in Series A round funding led by Accel Partners. The round also included contributions from both Atomico and Wellington Partners. A $30.6 million Series B investment round was secured in December 2012, led by Union Square Ventures. Contributions were also made by Japanese mobile telecoms group KDDI and business magnate Sir Richard Branson.

== Cities ==
Location	Launch	Slogan	Fare	Fee	Payment	Notes	Link
London	November 2011	The Black Cab App	£10+	None	Cash or card	5 min free waiting time	
New York City	2013	The Taxi Magnet	$3.00+^{1}	$1.99 peak $0.99 off-peak	Card (automatic)	Services Discontinued^{6}	
Barcelona	2013	La app para taxis en Barcelona^{2}	None	None	Cash or card	5 min free waiting time	
Boston	2012	The Boston Taxi App	$5.00+	$1.99 peak $0.99 off-peak	Card (automatic)	Services Discontinued^{6}	
Chicago	2012	The Chicago Taxi App	$5.00+	$1.50	Card (automatic)	Services Discontinued^{6}	
Cork	2013	The Taxi Magnet	None	None	Cash or card	5 min free waiting time	
Dublin	2012	The Taxi Magnet	None	None	Cash or card	5 min free waiting time	
Montreal^{3}	September 2013	L'application pour taxis de Montréal; The Montreal Taxi App	None	None	Card (automatic)	Services Discontinued^{6}	
Osaka	May 2013	The Osaka Taxi App	None	None	Cash or card	5 min free waiting time	
Madrid	May 2013	La app para taxis en Madrid^{4}	None	None	Cash or card	5 min free waiting time	
Washington, DC	May 2013	The DC Taxi App	$3.25+	$1.50	Card (automatic)	Services Discontinued^{6}	
Toronto	2012	The Toronto Taxi App	$4.25+	None	Card (automatic)	Services Discontinued^{6}	
Limerick	2013	The Taxi Magnet	None	None	Cash or card	5 min free waiting time	
Galway	2013	The Taxi Magnet	None	None	Cash or card	5 min free waiting time	
Atlanta	N/A^{6}	The Atlanta Taxi App					
Tokyo	Coming soon^{5}	The Tokyo Taxi App					
Remainder of Ireland	March 2014	The Taxi Magnet					

Notes

1. Includes $0.50 mandatory state surcharge
2. Translates to The App for Taxis in Barcelona
3. Marketed in both English and French
4. Translates to The App for Taxis in Madrid
5. Atlanta, Tokyo, and the remainder of Ireland are currently locations that Hailo plans on serving in the future.
6. Hailo shuttered its North American operations in late 2014 in Canada and the US citing low profits and increased competition from Uber and Lyft - http://www.cbc.ca/news/business/hailo-taxi-app-to-close-up-shop-in-toronto-and-montreal-1.2798283

== Mobile application and e-hailing ==
A survey conducted by Hailo found that cab drivers spend an average of 40-60 percent of their time looking for fares.

The Hailo mobile e-hail application used mobile and GPS technology to match taxi drivers with passengers based on both availability and proximity. Hailo passengers made two taps on the Hailo smartphone app in order to request and confirm their e-hail. Once a driver electronically accepted a passenger, the waiting passenger was sent an updated time of arrival based on route information and real-time traffic information.

Customers also had the ability to specify if they required a wheelchair-accessible vehicle or a fixed price fare to designated location such as an airport terminal, where permitted. The Hailo driver app included social networking features, allowing drivers to alert each other of locations with high street fare demand, traffic conditions, speed traps and road construction obstacles.

Both the Hailo passenger and driver apps were compatible with both iOS and Android mobile devices.

== Mobile commerce ==
Hailo enabled its registered passengers to e-hail, pay and tip for taxi journeys using the credit or debit card details stored within Hailo's secure cloud wallet.

In some city locations, taxi drivers could also use Hailo to process credit and debit card payments for street hail fares by manually entering passenger card details upon reaching their destination.

Instant trip receipts were sent to passengers by email, containing journey and payment information along with instructions to help retrieve any property lost or forgotten in the taxi.

== Legal proceedings ==
In February 2013, Black Car Assistance Corporation and Livery Roundtable filed a lawsuit against the taxi and limousine commission to prevent e-hailing companies from expanding to New York City. In April 2013, a judge dismissed the lawsuit and Hailo won the right to begin an e-hail beta trial. The decision was subsequently appealed. After a second temporary restraining order was issued against the pilot program, Hailo became the only taxi-hailing app-maker to join the lawsuit in support of the city.

On 30 July 2021 Southcab Ltd acquired the UK trademark Hailo.
