= Dieter Zetsche =

German engineer and business executive (born 1953)

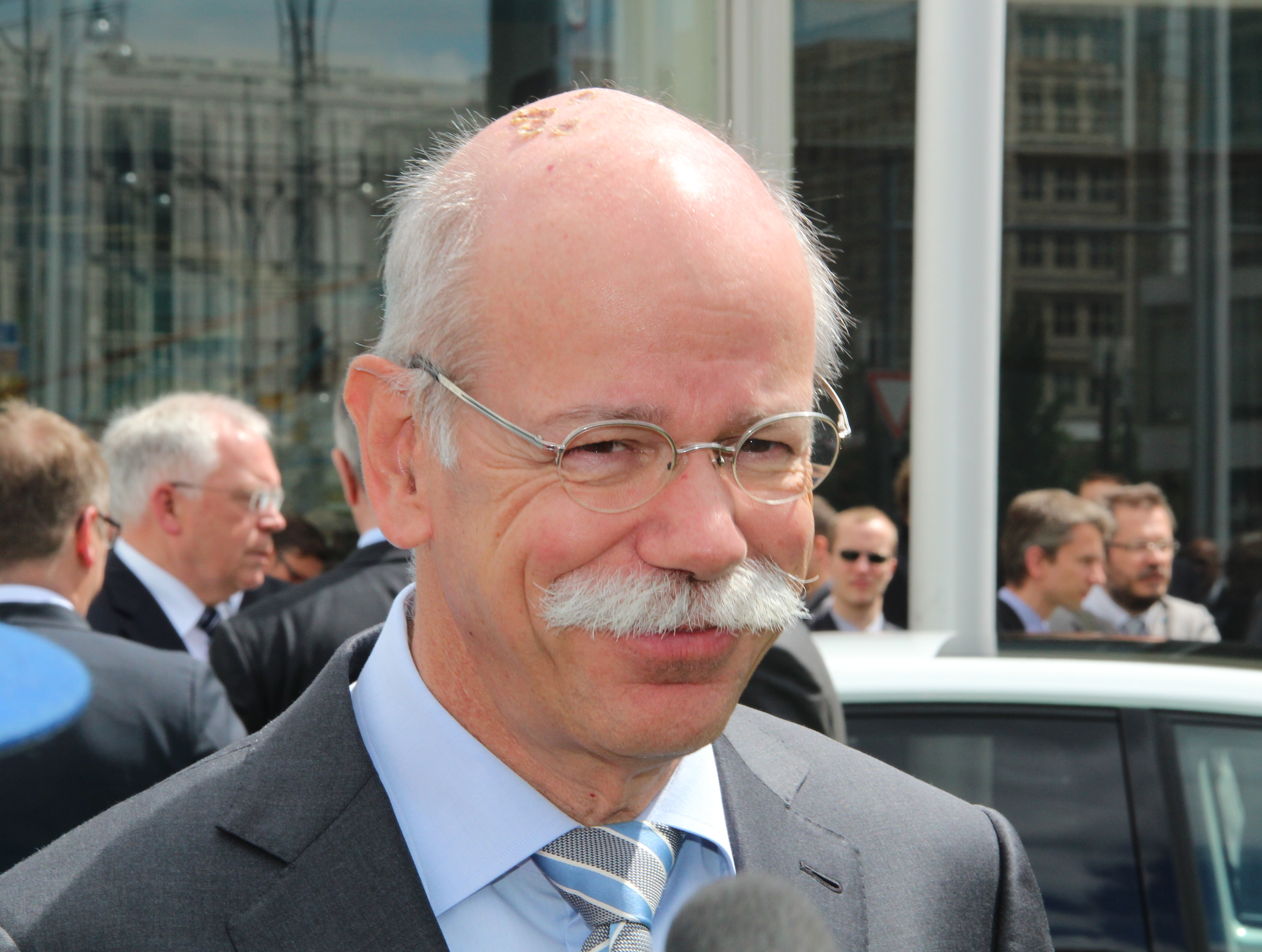
- Zetsche in 2013
- Born: Dieter Ernst Zetsche; 5 May 1953 (age 73); Istanbul, Turkey
- Other name: Dr. Z (Doctor Zed)
- Education: University of Karlsruhe; Paderborn University
- Occupation: Chairman of TUI AG
- Predecessor: Jürgen E. Schrempp
- Successor: Ola Källenius

Dieter Ernst Zetsche (German pronunciation: [ˌdiːtɐ ˈtsɛtʃə]; born 5 May 1953) is a German engineer and business executive. He serves as the chairman of TUI AG. Zetsche was the chairman of the board of management at Daimler AG and the head of Mercedes-Benz until 22 May 2019, a position he held since 2006. Additionally, he had been a member of Daimler's board since 1998.

== Early life and education ==
Zetsche was born in Turkey while his father, Herbert Zetsche, a civil engineer, was temporarily there for a dam construction project. The family returned to Germany in 1956. He attended school in Oberursel (near Frankfurt am Main) and studied electrical engineering from 1971 to 1976 at the University of Karlsruhe; he graduated as an engineer. He completed his doctorate in engineering in 1982 at Paderborn University.

== Career ==
=== Daimler ===
Zetsche joined the research department of Daimler-Benz in 1976, and became assistant development manager at the Vehicles business unit in 1981. He became a member of Daimler Chrysler's board of management in 1998 and was the president and CEO of Chrysler Group from mid-2000 to 31 December 2005, where he was credited with a turnaround of DCX's American operations. Since 1 January 2006, he succeeded Jürgen Schrempp as chairman of DaimlerChrysler (now Daimler AG), being succeeded in the position of Chrysler Group CEO by Thomas W. LaSorda.

Zetsche was the main influence behind the demerger of Daimler and Chrysler in 2007, which ended in the newly formed Daimler AG. Following profit warnings in 2012 and 2013, weak sales in China and tensions with Daimler's powerful labour representatives, his contract was renewed for only three years instead of the expected five. He received €14.4 million in pay and bonuses in 2014, making him the second-highest paid employee at a listed German company. After a record year for car sales and revenue in 2015, Zetsche's contract was extended to 2019.

Zetsche is credited with bringing significant core changes to Mercedes-Benz, in an effort to turn around a decade-long downward spiral in product quality and customer satisfaction. He was named in Time magazine's 2006 list of 100 most influential people. On the invitation of the Green Party’s leadership, Zetsche was invited to address the 2016 party conference.

In September 2018, it was announced that Zetsche will step down as the company's CEO in May 2019, in compliance of a two-year-long hiatus regulatory rule, before becoming chairman of Daimler's supervisory board in 2021, succeeding Manfred Bischoff.

==== Ask Dr. Z campaign ====
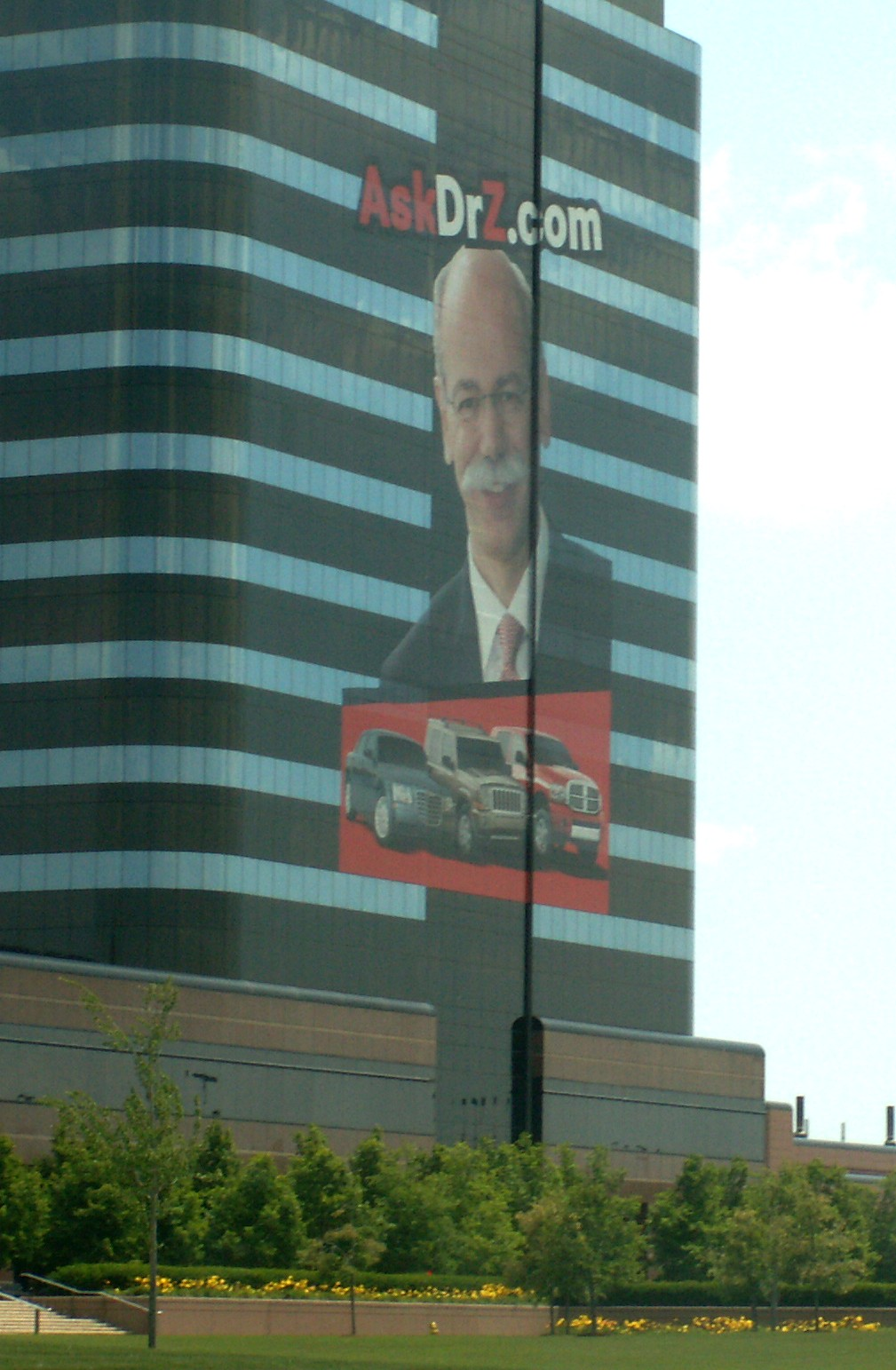
Chrysler headquarters advertising the website "AskDrZ.com"

On 30 June 2006 Chrysler Group announced the Employee Pricing Plus program, which featured Dieter Zetsche as Dr. Z (Doctor Zee), the DaimlerChrysler spokesman for a series of US and Canadian television commercials, also animated in cartoon format on the company's Ask Dr. Z website, which began on 1 July.

The "Ask Dr. Z" campaign included television, radio, print, online, in-dealership and customer relationship marketing media components and aggressive marketing tactics (mobile billboards, aerial banners, street teams), as well as targeting the NASCAR fan community. In the "Ask Dr. Z" ad campaign he provides answers to customers' questions and exits by saying Auf Wiedersehen (German for "goodbye" or "see you again").

The ad campaign emphasized the consumer benefits of combined American and German engineering and design. One commercial included Zetsche riding in a Jeep Liberty while crossing a pile of logs; another showed him in the trunk of a Dodge Caravan minivan, heading a soccer ball; and the last showed him at the wheel of a Chrysler Pacifica during a crash test, then emerging from the wreckage unscathed.

The campaign was criticized for having the wrong guy for doing funny ads. CNW Marketing Research poll showed most people thought Dr. Z was a fictional character, did not notice the employee discount offer in the ads and radio commercial listeners had difficulty understanding his German accent. DaimlerChrysler hurriedly withdrew the Dr. Z campaign three months later, due to a significant loss in market share. However, some of the Dr. Z ads were still seen on Canadian television. In later broadcasts, the tagline in Dr. Z TV ads was changed to "See the best in German and North American design in your Dodge and Chrysler dealer."

As a response to shrinking sales, its employee pricing plus program was extended through the end of August and three new TV ads, which did not feature Dr. Z, were added to the August campaign.

==== Test track death accident lawsuit ====
In the autumn of 2011, Zetsche was investigated for the involuntary manslaughter of a 27-year-old engineer who died in an accident caused by an intern on one of the firm's test tracks. The newspaper Stuttgarter Zeitung reported earlier that the parents of the engineer felt the company should not have put the intern behind the wheel of a fast car on a test track. However, it was generally agreed that the public prosecutors were over-reaching their prosecutorial authority in holding Zetsche responsible, as he was not responsible in any way for regulating the limits of interns' activities while at the company.

=== TUI AG ===
In February 2018, before the announcement of his departure from Daimler, in the annual general meeting held by tourism company TUI AG, Zetsche was elected as a member of the supervisory board. In May, he was elected chairman of TUI’s Supervisory Board.

== Other activities (selection) ==
=== Corporate boards ===
- TUI Group, Chair of the Supervisory Board (since 2019)
- Aldi Süd, Member of the Advisory Board (since 2019)
- Deutsche Bank, Member of the European Advisory Board (2006–present)
- RWE, Member of the Supervisory Board (2009–2016)
- Munro & Associates, Member of Board of Directors (2025–Present) (https://www.youtube.com/watch?v=sxbRcP1DPYE) Reference
- Factorial Energy, Member of Board of Directors (2026–Present)

=== Non-profit organizations ===
- Federation of German Industries (BDI), Member of the Presidium (2018–2019)
- Deutscher Zukunftspreis, Member of the Board of Trustees
- German Association of the Automotive Industry (VDA), Vice President of the Managing Board
- European Automobile Manufacturers Association (ACEA), Member of the Board of Directors
- European School of Management and Technology (ESMT), Chairman of the Board of Trustees, Chairman of the International Advisory Council
- Baden-Badener Unternehmer-Gespräche (BBUG), Member of the Board of Trustees
- Brookings Institution, Member of the International Advisory Council
- Stifterverband für die Deutsche Wissenschaft, Member of the Board
- Turkey: Culture of Change Initiative (TCCI), Member of the Advisory Board
