= Edzard Reuter =

German businessman (1928–2024)

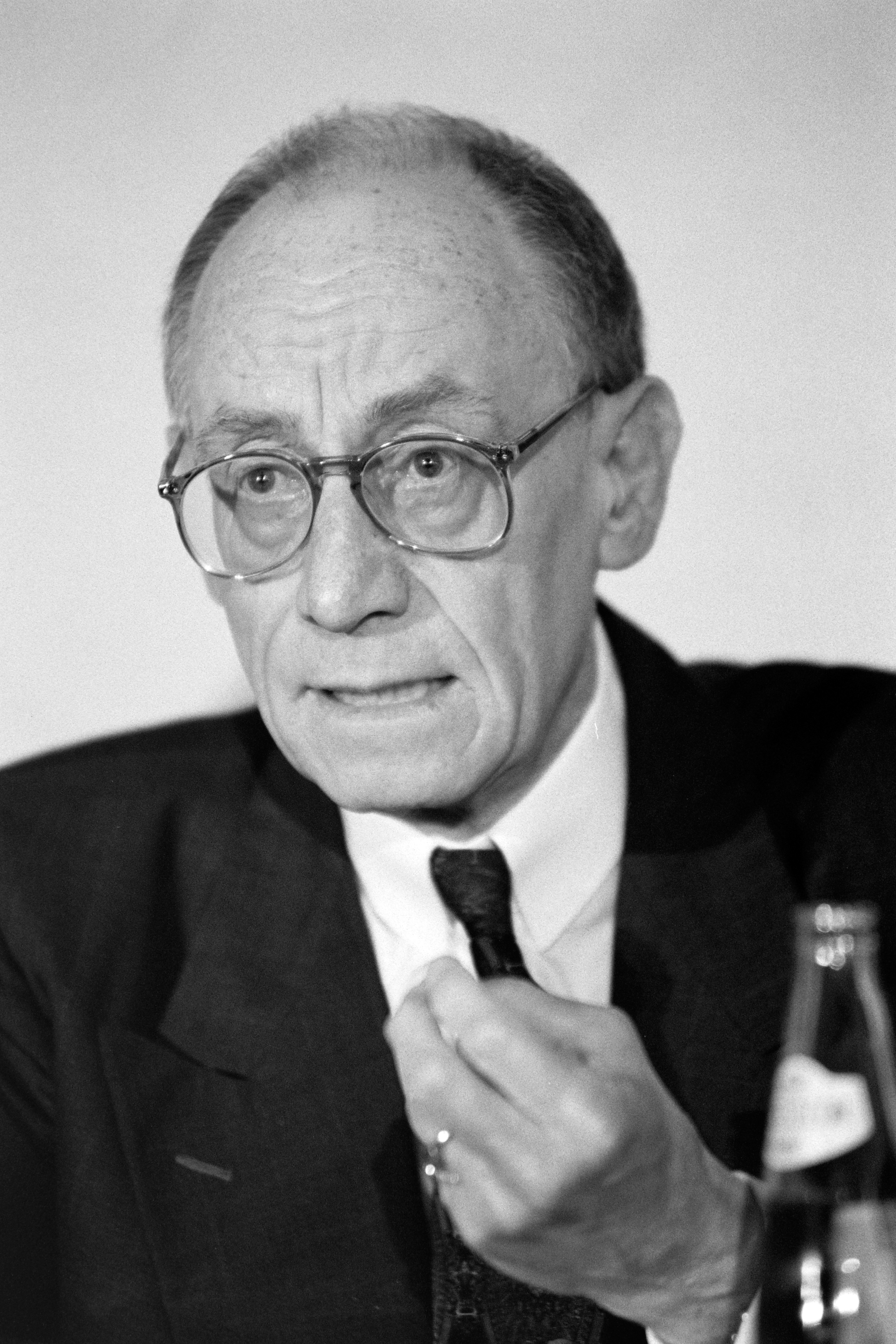
- Reuter in 1991
- Born: 16 February 1928; Berlin, Brandenburg, Prussia, Germany
- Died: 27 October 2024 (aged 96); Stuttgart, Baden-Württemberg, Germany
- Education: Humboldt University of Berlin; Georg August University of Göttingen; Free University of Berlin
- Occupation: Business executive
- Title: CEO of Daimler-Benz
- Term: 1987–1995
- Predecessor: Werner Breitschwerdt
- Successor: Jürgen E. Schrempp
- Parent(s): Ernst Reuter; Hanna Kleinert

Edzard Hans Wilhelm Reuter (16 February 1928 – 27 October 2024) was a German businessman. He was the CEO of Daimler-Benz from 1987 to 1995.

== Early life ==
Edzard Reuter was born in Berlin on 15 February 1928. His father was the popular social democratic politician and later mayor of Berlin, from 1948 to 1953, Ernst Reuter. His mother Hanna Reuter née Kleinert was a secretary at the party newspaper Vorwärts. Under the Nazi regime, the family was forced to flee Germany; they found exile in Ankara, Turkey, where Reuter spent his childhood and youth. In 1946, Reuter joined the Social Democratic Party of Germany (SPD).

After returning to Germany in 1946, Reuter studied mathematics and theoretical physics at the University of Berlin, now known as Humboldt University of Berlin, but then in East Berlin. He transferred to the Georg August University of Göttingen. In 1949, he switched over to studying law at the newly founded Free University of Berlin. In 1955, Reuter completed his state examinations.

== Career ==
From 1954 to 1956, he was an assistant at the Free University. After applying for a job for Daimler-Benz and failing, possibly because of his political orientation, Edzard Reuter became an authorized signatory for UFA, the German film studio and then an executive for Bertelsmann, a media corporation.

In 1964, Hanns Martin Schleyer recruited Reuter to work at the Daimler-Benz headquarters in Stuttgart, where he advanced to the board of managers. In July 1987, he succeeded Werner Breitschwerdt as chairman of the board upon recommendation of Alfred Herrhausen. Upon his assumption of office Reuter avowed himself to an "open" corporate culture. His takeovers were the aircraft and defense technology of Dornier, Messerschmitt-Bölkow-Blohm and MTU Friedrichshafen, electronics from Matra, and household appliances from AEG. Daimler-Benz became a giant corporation, but it cost the company billions in losses. The way he exercised his functions was criticized by many including the economist Ekkehard Wenger. In May 1995, Reuter was succeeded by Jürgen E. Schrempp, who gave up his predecessor's business philosophy choosing instead to emphasize shareholder value.

In August 1994, Reuter mentioned himself as a possible candidate for mayor of Berlin, but none of the parties showed interest. In 1998, Reuter became an honorary citizen of Berlin, especially for his dedication for the expansion of the Potsdamer Platz.

== Death ==
Reuter died in Stuttgart, Germany, on 27 October 2024, at the age of 96.

== Writings ==
- Reuter, Edzard (2013). Egorepublik Deutschland (in German). Campus Verlag. ISBN 978-3-593-42011-0.

=== Autobiography ===
- Reuter, Edzard (1999). Schein und Wirklichkeit (in German). Berlin: Siedler. ISBN 978-3-442-75571-4.
