= Jürgen E. Schrempp =

German businessman (born 1944)

Jürgen Erich Schrempp
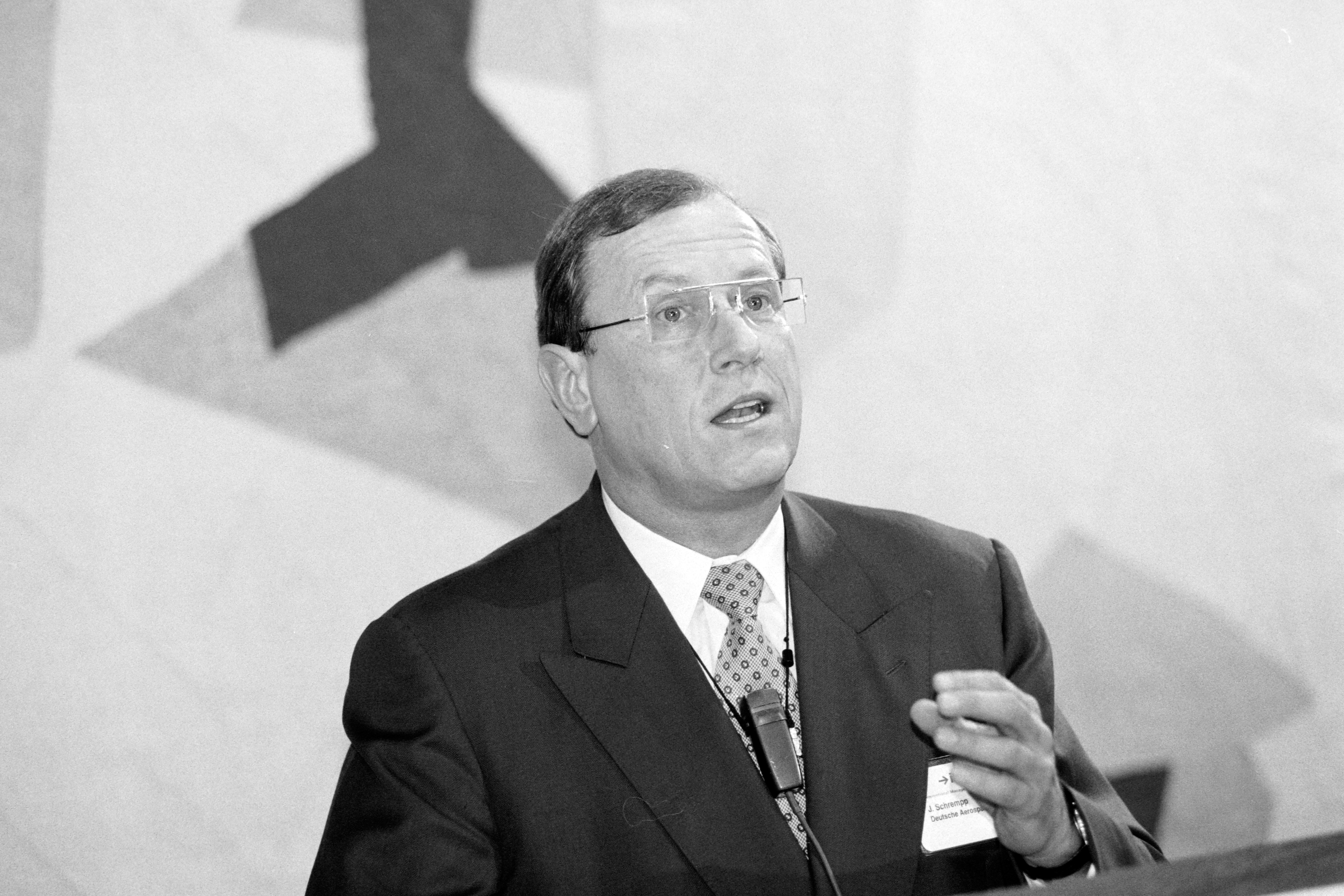
- Jürgen E. Schrempp in 1993
- Born: 15 September 1944 (age 81); Freiburg, Germany
- Education: University of Applied Sciences Offenburg
- Occupation: Business executive
- Title: CEO of Daimler-Benz
- Term: 1995–2005
- Predecessor: Edzard Reuter
- Successor: Dieter Zetsche

Jürgen Erich Schrempp (born 15 September 1944, in Freiburg) is the former CEO of Daimler-Benz from May 1995 to 31 December 2005, which became DaimlerChrysler, a German-American car and truck manufacturer. Following a decision of the board taken on 28 July 2005, he was succeeded on 1 January 2006, by Chrysler frontman Dieter Zetsche. Schrempp was the architect of the merger joint venture between Daimler Benz and Chrysler, which ultimately ended in failure when Chrysler was sold in 2007.

== Career ==
Schrempp studied engineering at the University of Applied Sciences Offenburg and did his apprenticeship at Mercedes-Benz. From 1974 to 1980 he served in executive positions at Mercedes-Benz of South Africa. Between 1982 and 1984 he was an executive at Euclid Trucks, returning to Daimler-Benz in 1985.

From 1989 to 1995, Schrempp headed the aerospace division of Daimler-Benz, then called DASA, which is EADS today. DASA acquired the Dutch aircraft manufacturer Fokker that was already in difficulty in 1993 after it signed a contract stating the intention to take Fokker over on 30 October 1992. Schrempp called Fokker his "love baby".

In 1995, Schrempp was appointed CEO of Daimler-Benz, succeeding Edzard Reuter. On 22 January 1996, after having subsidized the losses of Fokker with billions of Deutsche Marks, Daimler-Benz decided to stop putting more money into Fokker, and the firm subsequently went bankrupt.

During his tenure at Daimler-Benz, Schrempp oversaw the 80% acquisition of the Chrysler Corporation in 1998 to become DaimlerChrysler. Schrempp called the merger a "match made in heaven". In addition to the acquisition of Chrysler, Schrempp pursued the acquisition of Mitsubishi Motors as part of his 'Three Pillars' strategy to expand the reach of Daimler-Benz into the major markets of the United States and Asia.

In 2004, the Mitsubishi investment became a liability with the Japanese manufacturer swamped under a mountain of debt and following a refusal by other members of the Japanese Mitsubishi keiretsu to assist Daimler in funding its operation. The German company eventually walked away with substantial losses. On 14 May 2007, Daimler sold 80% of Chrysler to the private equity firm Cerberus.

Under the lead of Schrempp, Mercedes-Benz's 'legendary' reputation for quality suffered, critics alleged the brand "lost its engineering focus and has placed a higher value on cost." Meanwhile, the profits gained from cost-cutting seeped away to loss-making ventures such as the Smart brand and the investments in Chrysler and Mitsubishi

On 31 December 2005, Schrempp was succeeded by Dieter Zetsche as CEO of Daimler. Although officially a voluntary departure, reports suggested that Schrempp was 'ousted' from his position.

Schrempp is a Director of South African Coal, Oil and Gas, and Richemont, Switzerland. Additional engagements include the Chairmanship of United Global Academy - UGA, the advisory board of Deutsche Bank, the European Advisory Board of Harvard Business School, and the German Council of INSEAD. He is also on the board of Transnet. He is also an Honorary Consul General for South Africa to the German states of Baden-Württemberg, Rhineland-Palatinate and Saarland.

He was previously a non-executive director of Vodafone Group plc, after their 2000 take over of Mannesman Group. He is a former member of the Steering Committee of the Bilderberg Group.

== Recognition ==
Schrempp is the recipient of:

- Cross of the Order of Merit of the Federal Republic of Germany
- Bavarian Order of Merit
- Medal of Merit of the Federal State of Baden-Württemberg
- Commander of the National Order of Merit of the French Republic
- Commander of the French Legion of Honour
- The Vatican City’s Cross of the St. Gregorius Order
- Austrian Grand Decoration of Honor in Gold with Star for Services
- Brazilian Southern Cross.
- Woodrow Wilson Award for Corporate Citizenship
- Commander of the Order of Good Hope

== Personal life ==
Schrempp lives primarily in Munich, Germany and Kitzbuehel Austria where his wife, Lydia Schrempp, owns an Italian restaurant. He has been married to Lydia since 2000, with whom he has a daughter, Loana Theresa, (born in 2001) and a son, Luca-Timon, (born in 2005). Schrempp has two sons, Alexander and Marc, from his previous marriage to Renate Lutz, which was ended by Lutz due to Schrempp's adulterous affair with Lydia, who was his secretary at the time. When she was his secretary, Schrempp reportedly paid Lydia a 200,000 euro yearly salary, more than double that of other staff in similar positions, after criticism from press, shareholders and Daimler employees Lydia resigned in 2010.

As of 2010, Schrempp owns a farm in Eastern Transvaal, South Africa.
