= Li Shufu =

Chinese billionaire entrepreneur (born 1963)

- 李书福
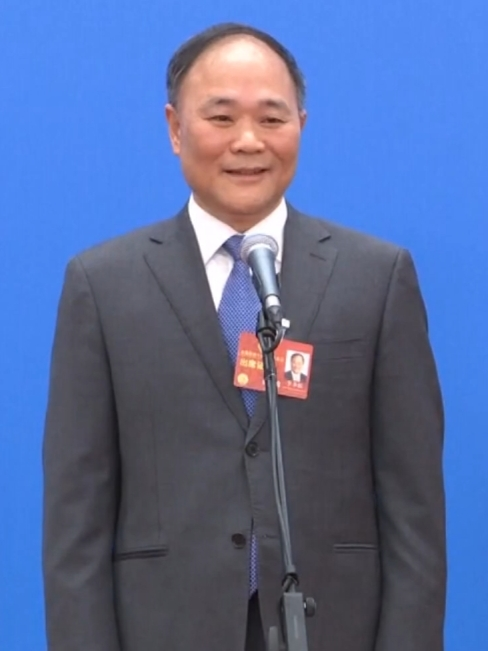
- Li in 2023
- Born: 25 June 1963 (age 63); Taizhou, Zhejiang, China
- Education: Yanshan University
- Occupation: Entrepreneur
- Years active: 1986–present
- Organization: Chinese People's Political Consultative Conference
- Title: Founder and chairman of Geely; Chairman of Volvo Cars
- Spouse: Wang Li (王丽)
- Children: 2

Eric Li Shufu (simplified Chinese: 李书福; traditional Chinese: 李書福; pinyin: Lǐ Shūfú; born 25 June 1963) is a Chinese billionaire entrepreneur. He is the founder and chairman of Geely.

== Early life ==
Li Shufu was born in Taizhou, Zhejiang. He has a master's degree from Yanshan University.

== Career ==
Li founded Geely in November 1986; it is now the second-largest private automobile manufacturer in China.

On 28 March 2010, Geely signed a deal worth US$1.8 billion to buy Swedish automobile manufacturer Volvo Cars from American automobile manufacturer Ford Motor Company. It was the largest foreign purchase by a Chinese car manufacturer. Along with $900m of working capital from Geely and a commitment to build a Volvo factory in China, Li had a target of driving sales to 600,000 by 2015 in the domestic market.

In 2013, Hurun Report ranked Li the 63rd richest person in mainland China, with a net worth of US$2.6 billion.

Li announced in November 2018 that he had entered into an agreement with the China Aerospace Science and Industry Corp. to build a new line of supersonic bullet trains. The plan is for the trains to run using newly developed technology. Li said, "Core technology can't be bought. The more you use others' technology, the more reliant you become. We have to innovate on our own. The journey will be tough but the prospects are promising."

In 2018, according to the Financial Times, Li became Daimler's largest shareholder, with a 9.7% stake in the German automaker.

In March 2020, Li was in talks to merge Volvo with Geely in a move to create a global automaker. Both Volvo and Geely were owned by Li's investment fund Zhejiang Geely Holding Group, but operated as separate entities.

In September 2022, Shufu's group acquired a 7.6% stake in Aston Martin. In May 2023, Geely increased its stake to 17%, becoming the third-largest shareholder.

In August 2026, Li is stepping down as CEO of Geely Auto.

== Political life ==
Li is a member of the 14th National Committee of the Chinese People's Political Consultative Conference (CPPCC). Li served as an independent non-party affiliated delegate to the 13th National People's Congress, as one of the 94 delegates from Zhejiang.

== Economic views ==
Li has criticized the automotive industry joint venture system in China as producing large profits for foreign original equipment manufacturers (OEMs) and Tier 1 suppliers at the expense of innovation, quality, and technology advancement by Chinese automotive OEMs. According to Li, this has led to complacency by domestic automotive OEMs by relying on profits from foreign partners through joint ventures instead of driving their own organisations to hire talent and improve, knowing they would control half of joint ventures run with profitable overseas manufacturers that generate healthy sales. He has previously argued for state-owned automotive manufacturers to partner with privately run companies.

== Personal life ==
Li is married to Wang Li, (王丽) and the family resides in Hangzhou, Zhejiang.
