= Freenow =

Mobility provider with ride-hailing service and business travel management platform

Intelligent Apps GmbH
- Formerly: mytaxi
- Type: Subsidiary
- Industry: Mobility as a service
- Predecessors: mytaxi, Hailo, Clever Taxi, Beat, Kapten
- Founded: 2009; 17 years ago
- Founders: Niclaus Mewes; Sven Külper; Tomás Ó Riain
- Headquarters: Hamburg, Germany
- Area served: Austria, France, Germany, Greece, Ireland, Italy, Poland, Spain, United Kingdom
- Key people: Thomas Zimmermann (CEO); Lennart Zipfel (CFO)
- Services: Vehicle for hire, taxi, carsharing, e-scooter, electric bicycle, e-moped
- Owner: Lyft
- Number of employees: ~1,000 (2025)
- Divisions: Freenow for Business
- Website: www.free-now.com

Freenow, a division of Lyft, is a mobility-as-a-service provider headquartered in Hamburg, Germany. It operates a mobile app that allows users to book taxis, private hire vehicles and various micromobility options such as e-scooters, e-bikes, e-mopeds and carsharing services. Freenow operates in over 150 cities in nine European countries.

The mobile app can be used to book e-scooters from scooter-sharing systems including Dott, Tier and Voi, e-mopeds from Emmy, Felyx and Cooltra, and e-bikes. The platform also offers access to carsharing services through partners such as Share Now and Sixt.

== History ==
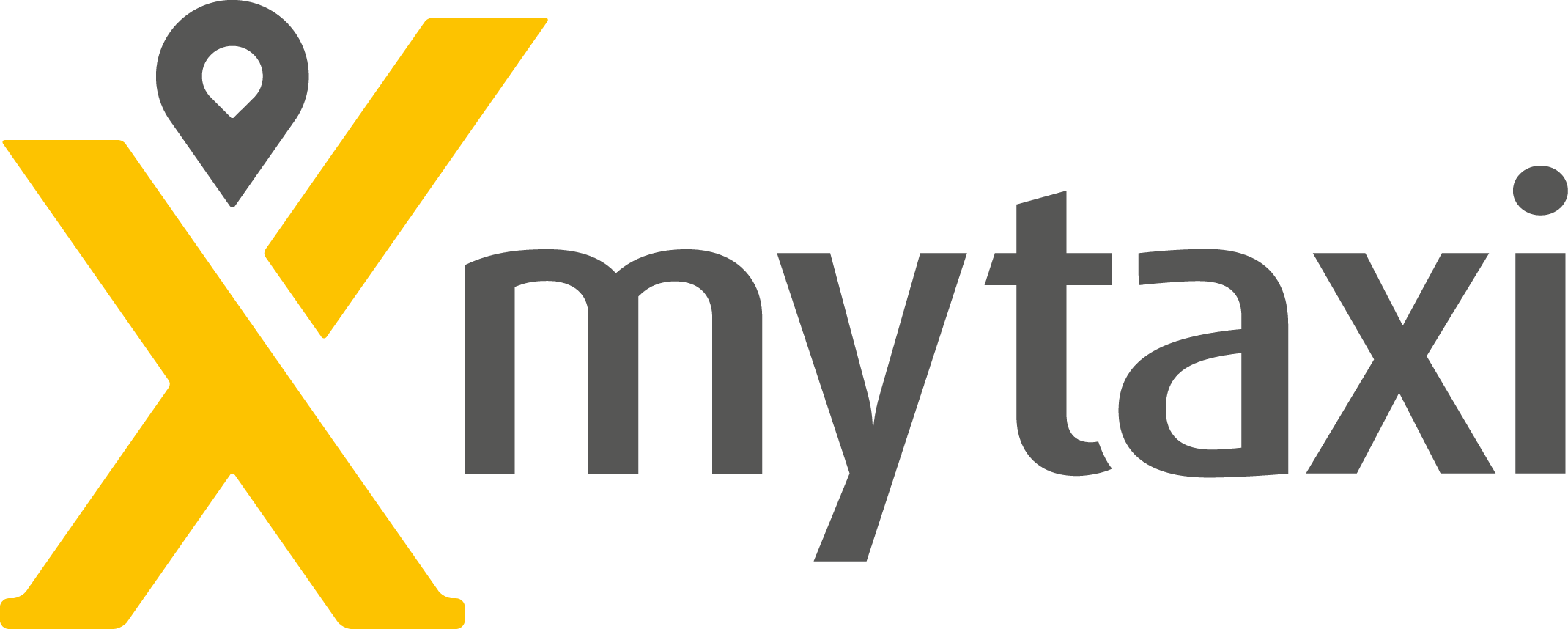
mytaxi logo

Freenow's origins trace back to the founding of mytaxi in 2009 by German entrepreneurs Niclaus Mewes and Sven Külper. The legal entity, Intelligent Apps GmbH, was also established that year.

In September 2014, Daimler AG (now Mercedes-Benz Group) acquired Intelligent Apps, entering the ride-hailing market. In 2016, Daimler acquired Hailo, a British taxi-hailing app founded in 2011. Hailo was rebranded to mytaxi, which created a large app-based licensed taxi operator in Europe. Over the following years, mytaxi expanded by acquiring companies like Beat (formerly Taxibeat) in Greece in February 2017 and Clever Taxi in Romania in June 2017.

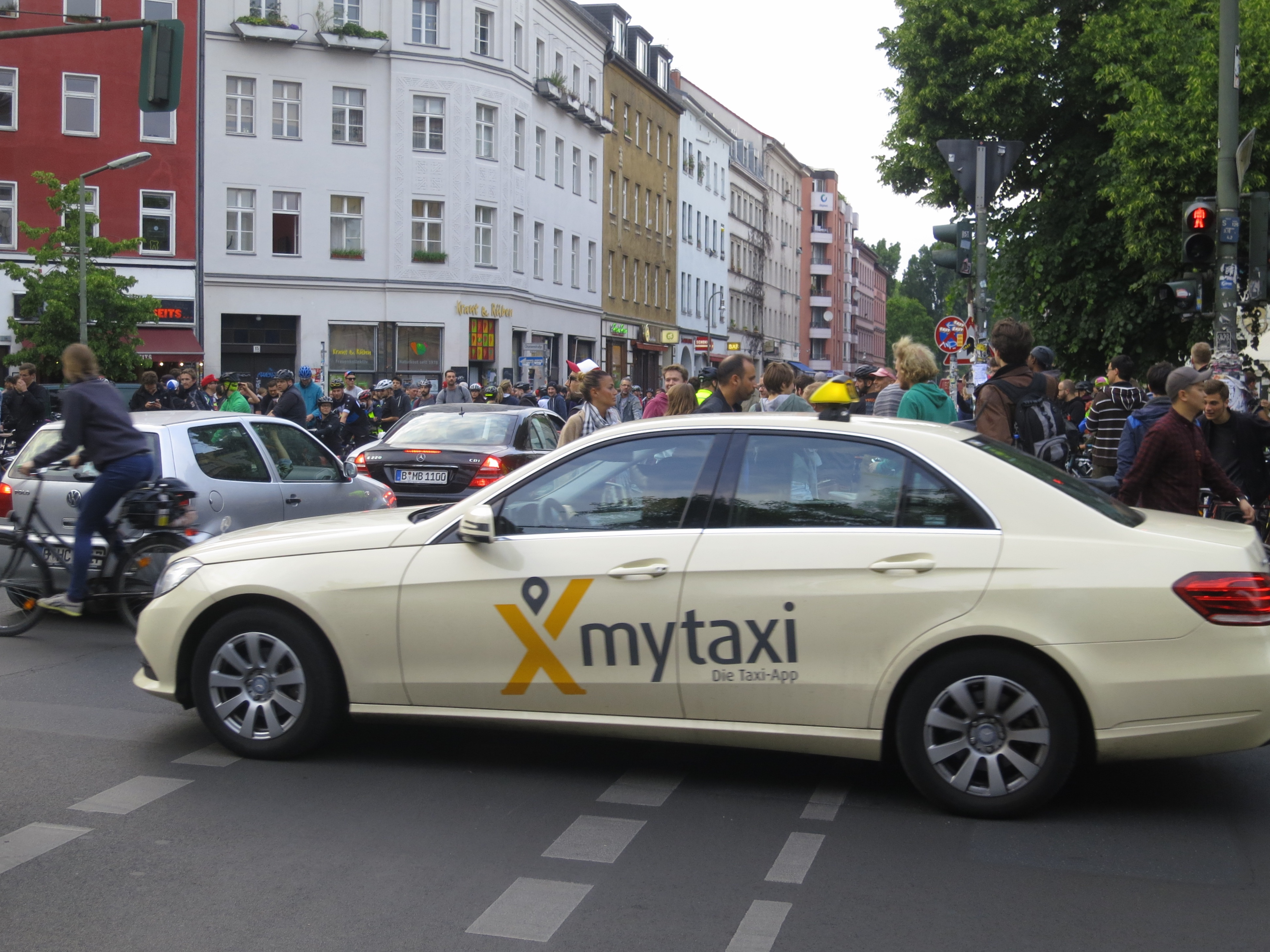
A mytaxi vehicle in Berlin, 2018

In February 2019, Daimler and BMW announced a €1 billion mobility joint venture called Your Now, combining their various mobility services, including the car-sharing platform Share Now, the multimodal app ReachNow, Park Now and Charge Now. mytaxi was rebranded to Freenow on July 1, 2019.

The joint venture also operated Hive, an e-scooter brand, which was discontinued by mid-2020 as the company shifted its strategy to partner with third-party operators instead.

The platform's consolidation under the new branding continued, with other services such as France's Kapten being fully integrated into the Freenow platform on 2 December 2020.

In January 2021, Freenow announced it would allocate over €100 million in resources over the subsequent five years to promote the electrification of its vehicle fleet across Europe.

In 2022, following a strategic review to focus on its core markets, Freenow withdrew from several countries, including Portugal, Romania and Sweden.

In July 2025, Lyft acquired the company for €175 million, expanding in Europe.
