= Enter conference =

ENTER eTourism Conference is a yearly international conference hosted by the International Federation for IT and Travel & Tourism (IFITT). ENTER conference papers undergo a blind peer-review and the conference proceedings are published in a book titled "Information and Communication Technologies in Tourism [YEAR]" by Springer.

== Previous ENTER conferences ==
- 1994 Innsbruck, Austria (January 12–14, 1994)
- 1995 Innsbruck, Austria (January 18–20, 1995)
- 1996 Innsbruck, Austria (January 17–19, 1996)
- 1997 Edinburgh, United Kingdom (January 22–24, 1997)
- 1998 Istanbul, Turkey (January 21–23, 1998)
- 1999 Innsbruck, Austria (January 20–22, 1999)
- 2000 Barcelona, Spain (April 26–28, 2000)
- 2001 Montreal, Canada (April 24–27, 2001)
- 2002 Innsbruck, Austria (January 22–25, 2002)
- 2003 Helsinki, Finland (January 29–31, 2003)
- 2004 Cairo, Egypt (January 26–28, 2004)
- 2005 Innsbruck, Austria (January 25–28, 2005)
- 2006 Lausanne, Switzerland (January 18–20, 2006)
- 2007 Ljubljana, Slovenia (January 24–26, 2007)
- 2008 Innsbruck, Austria (January 23–25, 2008)
- 2009 Amsterdam, the Netherlands (January 28–30, 2009)
- 2010 Lugano, Switzerland (February 10–12, 2010)
- 2011 Innsbruck, Austria (January 26–28, 2011)
- 2012 Helsingborg, Sweden (January 24–27, 2012)
- 2013 Innsbruck, Austria (January 22–25, 2013)
- 2014 Dublin, Ireland (January 21–24, 2014)
- 2015 Lugano, Switzerland (February 3–6, 2015)
- 2016 Bilbao, Spain (February 2–5, 2016)
- 2017 Rome, Italy (January 24–27, 2017)
- 2018 Jönköping, Sweden (January 24–26, 2018)
- 2019 Nicosia, Cyprus (January 30-February 1, 2019)
- 2020 Guildford, UK (January 8–10, 2020)
- 2021 Virtual Conference (January 19–22, 2021)
- 2022 Virtual Conference (January 11–14, 2022)
- 2023 Johannesburg, South Africa (January 18–20, 2023)
- 2024 Izmir, Turkey (January 17–19, 2024)
- 2025 Wroclaw, Poland (19-21 February 2025)
