= Renata Jungo Brüngger =

Swiss lawyer

- Born: 7 August 1961 (age 64); Fribourg, Switzerland
- Occupation: lawyer
- Known for: Daimler AG executive

Renata Maria-Anna Jungo Brüngger (born 7 August 1961) is a Swiss lawyer. She is the second female member of the Board of Management in the history of Daimler AG.

== Early life ==
Renata Jungo completed a bilingual law degree at the University of Friborg (Switzerland) in 1985 and was admitted to the bar in 1989.

== Career ==
From 1990, Jungo Brüngger worked as a lawyer at the Swiss law firm Bär & Karrer. In 1995, she became head of the legal department at Metro Holding AG. From 2000, she held the position of "General Counsel Corporate EMEA" and "Vice President/General Counsel Emerson Process Management EMEA" at Emerson Electric in Switzerland. In 2011, she joined Daimler AG as head of the “Legal” division. On 1 January 2016, she was appointed to the Board of Management of Daimler AG, where she took over the "Integrity and Law" department as the successor to Christine Hohmann-Dennhardt. She has been a member of Munich Re's supervisory board since 3 January 2017.

== Other activities ==
- Munich Re, Member of the Supervisory Board (since 2017)

== Personal life ==
Jungo Brüngger, who is a hobby mountaineer, is married to Alfred Daniel Brüngger, the couple have no children.
