= Mobility as a service =

Internet assisted travel planning

Mobility as a service (MaaS) is a type of service that enables users to plan, book, and pay for multiple types of mobility services through an integrated platform. Transportation services from public and private transportation providers are combined through a unified gateway, usually via an app or website, that creates and manages the trip and payments, including subscriptions, with a single account. The key concept behind MaaS is to offer travelers flexible mobility solutions based on their travel needs, thus "mobility as a service" also refers to the broader concept of a shift away from personally-owned modes of transportation and towards mobility provided as a service.

Travel planning typically begins in a journey planner. For example, a trip planner can show that the user can get from one destination to another by using a train/bus combination. The user can then choose their preferred trip based on cost, time, and convenience. At that point, any necessary bookings (e.g. calling a taxi, reserving a seat on a long-distance train) would be performed as a unit. It is expected that this service should allow roaming, that is, the same end-user app should work in different cities, without the user needing to become familiar with a new app or to sign up to new services. Together with other emerging vehicular technologies such as automated driving, connected cars and electric vehicles, MaaS is contributing to a new type of future mobility, which is autonomous, connected, electric and shared vehicles.

== Trend towards MaaS ==
The growing demand for more personalized transportation services has created an opportunity for MaaS. The development of MaaS is supported by companies offering carpooling and ridesharing companies, bicycles, scooters, and carsharing services, as well as on-demand (“pop-up”) bus services. Interest in MaaS is also influenced by the potential emergence of self-driving cars, which call into question the value of owning a personal vehicle.

This shift is further enabled by improvements in the integration of multiple modes of transport into seamless trip chains, with bookings and payments managed collectively for all legs of the trip. In London, commuters may use a contactless payment bank card (or a dedicated travel card called an Oyster card) to pay for their travel. Between the multiple modes, trips, and payments, data is gathered and used to help people's journeys become more efficient. In the government space, the same data allows for informed decision-making when considering improvements in regional transit systems.

Most MaaS studies have been done in the Global North but in the Global South there is demand and proposals may have different characteristics like support for offline access and integration with informal transport.

== Potential impacts ==
Mobility as a service may cause a decline in car ownership. If average vehicle occupancy for on-road time decreases, total vehicle-kilometres-travelled will increase.

MaaS could significantly increase the efficiency and utilization of transit providers that contribute to the overall transit network in a region. The predictions were validated by the Ubigo trial in Gothenburg during which many private cars were deregistered for the duration of the trial and utilization of existing transit services increased the efficiency of the overall network. Ultimately, a more efficient network coupled with new technology such as autonomous vehicles could significantly reduce the cost of public transit.

MaaS could improve ridership habits, transit network efficiency, decrease costs to the user, improve utilization of MaaS transit providers, reduce city congestion as more users adopt MaaS as a main source of transit, and reduce emissions as more users rely on public transit component, autonomous vehicles in a MaaS network.

MaaS equally has many benefits for the business world - understanding the Total Cost of Business Mobility could help travel decision makers in the corporate world save hundreds of thousands. By analysing data and costs attributed to "business mobility" (e.g. vehicle rental costs, fuel costs, parking charges, train ticket admin fees and even the time taken to book a journey) businesses can make informed decisions about travel policy, fleet management and expense claims. Some MaaS companies suggest that in journey planning alone, it can take up to 9 steps before a simple travel arrangement is booked.

However, there are also many anticipated challenges for sustainability and governance stemming from MaaS, ranging from increased energy use, reduced health effects, and up to conflicts across organizations.

MaaS also holds remarkable potential in the revolutionizing of public transport systems in developing countries. Since developing countries tend to depend heavily on informal and unstructured public transport modes, the concept of MaaS according to some researchers, could hold the key to providing more efficient, equitable and accessible transportation services. In these contexts however, MaaS may need to be re-envisioned, and tailored to the unique challenges of the developing world, in order to create the desired impacts.

== Payment methods ==
The concept assumes use through mobile app, although the concept can also be used for any type of payment (transit card, ticket, etc.).

The concept is then broken down further into 2 payment models:

The Monthly subscription model assumes that enough users consume public transit services on a monthly basis to offer bundled transit service. Users pay a monthly fee and receive bundled transit services such as unlimited travel on urban public transport in addition to a fixed number of taxi kilometers. The monthly subscription model incorporates a well-funded commercially operated "MaaS Operator" which will purchase transport services in bulk and provide guarantees to users. In Hanover, Germany, the MaaS operator can purchase bulk transit services and act as the middleman through the product, Hannovermobil. It is not necessary that the operator include all forms of transport, but just enough to be able to provide reasonable guarantees. A monthly subscription will also provide enough funding for the MaaS operator to purchase significant enough transit services that it can use market power to achieve competitive prices. In particular, a MaaS operator may improve the problems of low utilization - e.g. in Helsinki, taxi drivers spend 75% of their working time waiting for a customer, and 50% of kilometers driven without generating revenue. A MaaS operator can solve this problem by guaranteeing a base salary to taxi drivers through existing employers.

The Pay-as-you-go model operates well in environments with a high number of "one-off" riders (tourists, transit networks in areas with high car adoption, etc.). Each leg of the booked trip (each train trip, taxi trip etc.) is priced separately and is set by the transport service provider. In this model, mobile applications would operate as search engines, seeking to draw all transport service providers into a single application, enabling users to avoid having to interact with multiple gateways in an attempt to assemble the optimal trip. Many cities have cards which pay for intermodal public transport, including Vienna and Stuttgart but none yet include taxis/on-demand buses in the service.

Both models have similar requirements, such as trip planners to construct optimal trip chains, and technical and business relationships with transport service providers, (i.e. a taxi booking/payment API and e-ticketing, QR codes on urban buses and metros, etc.).

== Impact of autonomous vehicles ==
As the development of the autonomous car accelerates, the company Uber has announced that it plans to transition its app to a fully autonomous service and aims to be cheaper than car ownership. Many automobile manufacturers and technology companies have announced plans or are rumored to develop autonomous vehicles, including Tesla, Mobileye, General Motors, Waymo, Apple, and Local Motors.

Autonomous vehicles could allow the public to use roads in low cost-per-kilometre, self-navigating vehicles to a preferred destination at a significantly lower cost than current taxi and ridesharing prices. The vehicles could have a large impact on the quality of life in urban areas and form a critical part of the future of transportation, while benefiting the traveler, the environment, and even other sectors such as healthcare.

Modelling scenarios were conducted on the deployment of shared autonomous vehicles on the city of Lisbon by PTV as part of the International Transport Forum's Corporate Partnership Board. This model shows that the positive impacts on transport networks and mobility in congested places will be realised to their greatest extent with increases in shared minibus/bus scale public transport in addition to ride-sharing; whereas autonomous taxis with individual passengers would see a large increase in vehicle kilometres and congestion.

In January 2016, the President of the United States, Barack Obama, secured funding to be used over the next ten years to support the development of autonomous vehicles.

== Historical timeline ==
In 1996, the concept of an "intelligent information assistant" integrating different travel and tourism services was introduced at the ENTER conference.

The concept first arose in Sweden. A well-executed trial was conducted in Gothenburg under the monthly subscription model. The service was well received; however, it was discontinued due to lack of support at the government level for third party on-selling of public transport tickets.

In June 2012, Agrion, an energy storage company, sponsored a 1/2-day conference in San Francisco, CA titled "E-Mobility as a Service" at which the concept of Mobility as a Service was discussed as a potential outcome of the confluence between the digital realm of smartphone technology and shared electric autonomous vehicles [hence the E-Mobility in the conferences title]. The notion of a digitally connected seamless multi-modal transportation network was discussed as a potential outcome of the real-time connectivity offered by the newly introduced smart phone. The idea was that this would become so ubiquitous and seamless that mobility could be "backgrounded" in the urban fabric similar to other essential utilities or services. It would come to be seen as common place as turning on the tap to get water or the light switch to get illumination; hence mobility-as-a-service.

The idea then gained widespread publicity through the efforts of Sampo Hietanen, CEO of ITS Finland (later founder and CEO of Maas Global), and Sonja Heikkila, then a Masters student at Aalto University, and the support of the Finnish Ministry of Transport and Communication.

MaaS became a popular topic at the World Congress on Intelligent Transport Systems 2015 in Bordeaux, and subsequently, the Mobility as a Service Alliance was formed. In 2017 the MaaS Alliance published its white paper on Mobility as a Service, and how to create foundation for thriving MaaS ecosystem.

The EU-funded "Mobinet" project has laid some of the groundwork for MaaS, e.g. pan-European identity management of travelers, and payments, and links to trip planners.

In September 2019, Berlin's public transport authority Berliner Verkehrsbetriebe (BVG) continued Mobility as a Service development by launching first in the world large scale and city owned project "Jelbi" together with a Lithuanian mobility startup Trafi.

In the United States, the US Department of Transportation began a series of demonstration projects called the "Mobility on Demand Sandbox Program" in 2016. Overseen by the Federal Transit Administration (FTA), the goals of the program included improved efficiency, effectiveness, and customer experience of transportation services. Eleven cities received almost $8 million to conduct demonstration projects which were evaluated based on performance measures provided by the project partners, as well as independent evaluators.

- The Palo Alto, California "Adaptive Mobility with Reliability and Efficiency" (AMORE) project tested a flexible service for commuting or first/last-mile connections to fixed-route service in relatively high-income, high-vehicle-ownership communities. The flexibility of a transit-hailing private company was melded with the efficiency of a fixed-route bus by grouping customers traveling in similar patterns and allowing quicker connections to the core transit system. The evaluation revealed the AMORE service worked as anticipated in the test environment, but lack of demand during implementation limited its effectiveness. Successor programs are under development.
- The Puget Sound First/Last Mile Partnership with Via to Transit project was designed to improve mobility by expanding access to transit by developing a partnership with a private sector mobility company, integrating the services with existing transit services, broadening access to a wider audience, including populations without smartphones, those who need wheelchair-accessible vehicles, unbanked populations, low-income populations, people of color, and populations with limited English proficiency, and inform best practices and FTA guidance for public-private partnerships and novel transit service delivery models. Although the project had to be terminated when the COVID-a9 epidemic began, the evaluation found that transit agencies improved and increase access to transit. Through significant public-private coordination, the pilot provided valuable lessons to inform how transit agencies can leverage on-demand first/last mile services to enhance mobility.

== List of current MaaS systems by country ==
=== Austria ===
The SMILE (Simply MobILE) project started in 2012 and the trial began in November 2014. Wegfinder began its operations in 2017.

=== Belgium ===
From September 2023 until June 2026, Brussels had the Floya app, a MaaS app to book public transport, scooters, bikes, and cars.

=== Chile ===
In 2024, Santiago incorporated Clipp MaaS, a mobility platform supported by Chile’s Ministry of Transport that integrates taxis, buses, trains, scooters and bicycles into a single application, enabling users to plan and combine different transport options.

=== Finland ===
Whim started in Helsinki in 2016 and provided 1.8 Million trips a year after launch. Matkahuolto launched its own service Routes and Tickets in 2020, which includes DRT.

=== Germany ===
Qixxit was a nationwide planning app by Deutsche Bahn. It was sold to lastminute.com in 2019.

=== Morocco ===
Weego, founded in 2020 in Morocco, is a MaaS platform integrating public transport, taxis, trains and shuttles through one application. It offers journey planning, real-time tracking, digital payments and transport subscriptions across several Moroccan cities.

=== The Netherlands ===
In 2019 seven MaaS projects were being organized around the country. Revamped 9292 app which includes DRT was launched in 2020.

=== Norway ===
Entur began its operations in 2018. It includes shared mobility.

=== Spain ===
Barcelona has developed SMOU, a MaaS platform that integrates different mobility options, including public transport information, bike-sharing, parking services, electric vehicle charging, taxis and shared mobility.

=== Sweden ===
UbiGo started as a pilot in Gothenburg and then launched in Stockholm. Trainplanet offers public transport travel chains combined with taxi rides.

=== United Kingdom ===
Transport for West Midlands launched a trial in 2018 that was promoted as the first MaaS app in the UK, but it "did not live up to expectations", according to TfWM's Head of Transport Innovation. A new trial is expected to launch in 2024.

=== United States ===
Go Denver was launched in February 2016, and it had over 7,000 users by June 2017. Pittsburgh ran the "Move PGH" two year pilot program from July 2021 to July 2023. In 2022 Tampa launched a six-month pilot in collaboration with Moovit to have 200 participants provide feedback. The app included mapping, planning, mobile ticketing, real-time arrival information, and parking options. The pilot was funded with $150,000 each from the Florida Department of Transportation and the city.

== See also ==
- Intelligent transportation system
- Demand-responsive transport
- as a service
