= Mercedes-Benz Group =

German multinational automotive company

Mercedes-Benz Group AG

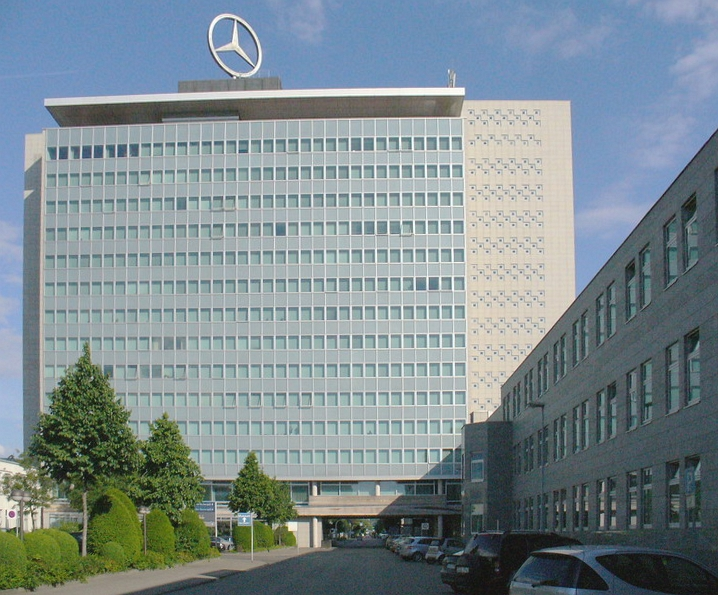
- Central headquarters in Mercedes-Benz complex Untertürkheim, Stuttgart
- Formerly: Daimler-Benz AG (1926–1998); DaimlerChrysler AG (1998–2007); Daimler AG (2007–2022)
- Type: Public
- Traded as: FWB: MBG; DAX component
- ISIN: DE0007100000
- Industry: Automotive
- Predecessors: Benz & Cie. (1883–1926); Daimler Motoren Gesellschaft (1890–1926)
- Founded: 28 June 1926; 100 years ago (original foundation of Daimler-Benz); 3 August 2007; 19 years ago (foundation of Daimler AG)
- Founders: Carl Benz; Wilhelm Kissel; Emil Georg von Stauß
- Headquarters: Stuttgart, Germany
- Area served: Worldwide
- Key people: Ola Källenius (chairman of the management board); Martin Brudermüller (chairman of the supervisory board)
- Products: Automobiles, commercial vehicles
- Production output: ▼2.389 million (2024 sales)
- Brands: Mercedes-Benz; Mercedes-EQ; Mercedes-Maybach; Mercedes-AMG; Smart
- Revenue: ▼€145.6 billion (2024)
- Operating income: ▼€13.60 billion (2024)
- Net income: ▼€10.41 billion (2024)
- Total assets: ▲€265.0 billion (2024)
- Total equity: ▲€93.63 billion (2024)
- Owners: Institutional investors (52.7%); Private shareholders (22.8%); BAIC Group (9.98%); Tenaciou3 Prospect Investment Limited (Li Shufu) (9.7%); Kuwait Investment Authority (6.8%)
- Number of employees: ▲175,264 (2024)
- Subsidiaries: List: Transportation; Mercedes-Benz Mexico; COMPAS (50%); Beijing Benz (49%); Fujian Benz (34%); Mercedes-Benz India; Smart (50%); Mercedes-Benz Cars Middle East; Manufacturing Commercial Vehicles Motorsports; Mercedes-AMG Petronas Formula One Team (33.3%) Engines; Engine Holding Finances; Mercedes-Benz Mobility; Mercedes-Benz Bank; Mercedes-Benz Financial Other; Here
- Website: group.mercedes-benz.com

Mercedes-Benz Group AG (formerly Daimler-Benz, DaimlerChrysler, and Daimler) is a German multinational automotive company headquartered in Stuttgart, Baden-Württemberg, Germany. It is one of the world's leading car manufacturers. Daimler-Benz was formed with the merger of Benz & Cie., the world's oldest car company, and Daimler Motoren Gesellschaft in 1926. The company was renamed DaimlerChrysler upon the acquisition of the American automobile manufacturer, Chrysler Corporation in 1998, it was renamed to Daimler upon the divestment of Chrysler in 2007. In 2021, Daimler was the second-largest German automaker and the sixth-largest worldwide by production. In February 2022, Daimler was renamed Mercedes-Benz Group as part of a transaction that spun-off its commercial vehicle segment as an independent company, Daimler Truck.

The Mercedes-Benz Group's marques are Mercedes-Benz for cars and vans (including Mercedes-AMG and Mercedes-Maybach). It has shares in other vehicle manufacturers such as Daimler Truck, BAIC Motor and Aston Martin. Since 2019, Smart left Daimler AG and became a 50/50 joint venture with Geely.

By unit sales, the Mercedes-Benz Group is the tenth-largest car manufacturer in the world; shipping two million passenger vehicles in 2021 and by revenue the seventh-largest car manufacturer worldwide in 2023. Also in 2023, the company was ranked 42nd in the Forbes Global 2000. The group provides financial services through its Mercedes-Benz Mobility arm. The company is a component of the Euro Stoxx 50 stock market index. The central company headquarters, the Mercedes-Benz offices, a car assembly plant, the Mercedes-Benz Museum and the Mercedes-Benz Arena are situated in the Mercedes-Benz complex in Stuttgart.

== History ==
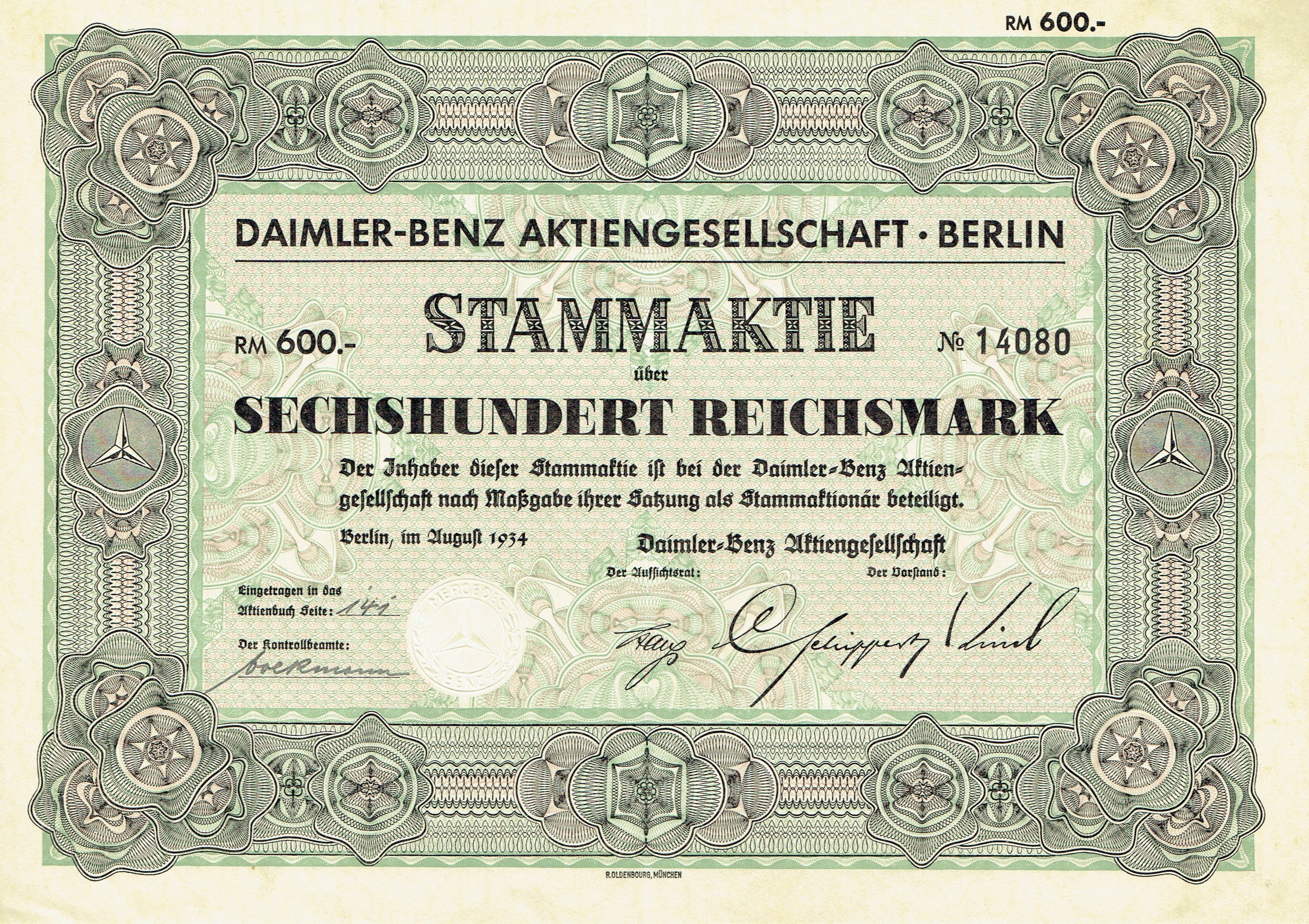
Share of the Daimler-Benz AG, issued August 1934

The Mercedes-Benz Group origin is in an Agreement of Mutual Interest signed on 1 May 1924 between Benz & Cie. (founded in 1883 by Carl Benz) and Daimler Motoren Gesellschaft (founded in 1890 by Gottlieb Daimler and Wilhelm Maybach). Both companies continued to manufacture their separate automobile and internal combustion engine marques until 28 June 1926, when Benz & Cie. and Daimler-Motoren-Gesellschaft formally merged – becoming Daimler-Benz AG (Aktiengesellschaft) – and agreed that thereafter, all of the factories would use the brand name of "Mercedes-Benz" on their automobiles. The inclusion of the name Mercedes in the new brand name honored the most important model series of DMG automobiles, the Mercedes series, which were designed and built by Wilhelm Maybach. They derived their name from a 1900 engine named after the daughter of Emil Jellinek. Jellinek became one of DMG's directors in 1900, ordered a small number of motor racing cars built to his specifications by Maybach, stipulated that the engine must be named Daimler-Mercedes, and made the new automobile famous through motorsports. That race car later became known as the Mercedes 35 hp. The first of the series of production models bearing the name Mercedes had been produced by DMG in 1902. Jellinek left the DMG board of directors in 1909.

The name of Daimler as a marque of automobiles had been given by Gottlieb Daimler for use by other companies. It is or was used principally by Daimler Motor Company and Austro-Daimler later Steyr-Daimler-Puch but also, very briefly by Daimler Manufacturing Company and Panhard-Daimler, and others. The new company, Daimler-Benz, did not obtain consent to include Daimler in its brand name and used the name Mercedes to represent the Daimler-Motoren-Gesellschaft interest. Karl Benz remained as a member of the board of directors of Daimler-Benz AG until his death in 1929.

Although Daimler-Benz is best known for its Mercedes-Benz automobile brand, during World War II, it also created a notable series of engines for German aircraft, tanks, and submarines. Its cars became the first choice of many Nazi, Fascist Italian, and Japanese officials including Hermann Göring, Adolf Hitler, Benito Mussolini, Francisco Franco and Hirohito, who most notably used the Mercedes-Benz 770 luxury car. Daimler also produced parts for German arms, most notably barrels for Mauser Kar98k rifles.

Prior to World War II, Mercedes-Benz gave Adolf Hitler dealer discounts. Once WW II began, Mercedes-Benz production lines were almost entirely dedicated to manufacturing for the Nazi Regime. During World War II, Daimler-Benz had over 60,000 concentration camp prisoners and other forced laborers to build machinery. After the war, Daimler admitted to its links and coordination with the Nazi government.

The final logo of Daimler-Benz AG, used until its merger with Chrysler Corporation in 1998

In 1966, Maybach-Motorenbau GmbH merged with Mercedes-Benz Motorenbau Friedrichshafen GmbH to form Maybach Mercedes-Benz Motorenbau GmbH, under partial ownership by Daimler-Benz. The company is renamed Motoren und Turbinen-Union Friedrichshafen GmbH (MTU Friedrichshafen) in 1969.

In 1989, Daimler-Benz InterServices AG (Debis) was created to handle data processing, financial and insurance services, and real estate management for the Daimler group. In 1995, MTU Friedrichshafen became a wholly owned subsidiary of Daimler-Benz.

=== 1998–2007: DaimlerChrysler ===
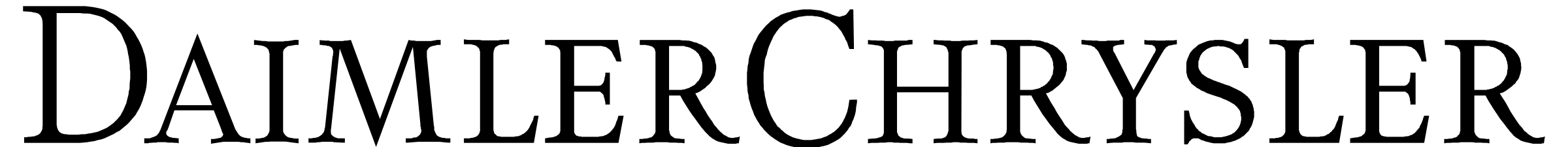
DaimlerChrysler logo, 1998–2007

In a so-called "merger of equals," or "marriage made in heaven," according to its then CEO and architect Jürgen E. Schrempp, Daimler-Benz, and United States–based automobile manufacturer Chrysler Corporation, the smallest of the main three American automakers, merged in 1998 in an exchange of shares and formed DaimlerChrysler AG. Valued at US$38 billion, it was the world's largest ever cross-border deal.

The terms of the merger allowed Daimler-Benz's non-automotive businesses such as Daimler-Benz InterServices AG, "debis AG" for short, to continue to pursue their respective strategies of expansion. debis AG reported revenues of $8.6 bn (DM 15.5 bn) in 1997.

The merger was contentious with investors launching lawsuits over whether the transaction was the 'merger of equals' that senior management claimed or actually amounted to a Daimler-Benz takeover of Chrysler. A class action investor lawsuit was settled in August 2003 for US$300 million while a suit by billionaire investor activist Kirk Kerkorian was dismissed on 7 April 2005. The transaction claimed the job of its architect, Chairman Jürgen E. Schrempp, who resigned at the end of 2005 in response to the fall of the company's share price following the transaction.

Another issue of contention is whether the merger delivered promised synergies and successfully integrated the two businesses. Martin H. Wiggers' concept of a platform strategy, like the VW Group's, was implemented only for a few models, so the synergy effects in development and production were low. As late as 2002, DaimlerChrysler appeared to run two independent product lines. Later that year, the company launched products that did integrate elements from both sides of the company, including the Chrysler Crossfire, which was based on the Mercedes SLK platform and utilized Mercedes's 3.2 L V6, and the Dodge Sprinter/Freightliner Sprinter, a re-badged Mercedes-Benz Sprinter van.

In 2000, DaimlerChrysler acquired the Detroit Diesel Corporation and placed its on-highway division under Daimler Trucks North America. The off-highway division was placed under MTU Friedrichshafen to form MTU America. Detroit Diesel branding has been maintained by DTNA and MTU America. In 2005, MTU-Friedrichshafen was sold to the Swedish investment firm EQT Partners. Also in 2000, DaimlerChrysler entered into an alliance with Mitsubishi Motors Corporation in an effort to reach the Asian market. The alliance resulted in the platform sharing between the 2002-2013 Colt and first-generation Smart Forfour, but the declining performance of Mitsubishi led DaimlerChrysler to sell its shares back by 2004.

In 2006, Chrysler reported losses of US$1.5 billion. It then announced plans to lay off 13,000 employees in mid-February 2007, close a major assembly plant and reduce production at other plants in order to restore profitability by 2008. That same year, Chrysler was overtaken by Toyota in the US market, leaving it outside of the traditional "Big Three" of US automakers for the first time.

DaimlerChrysler had reportedly approached other carmakers and investment groups to sell Chrysler in early 2007. General Motors was reported to be a suitor, but Daimler agreed to sell the Chrysler unit to Cerberus Capital Management in May 2007 for US$6 billion and completed the sale on 3 August 2007. The original agreement stated that Cerberus would take an 80.1 percent stake in the new company, Chrysler Holding LLC. DaimlerChrysler changed its name to Daimler AG and retained the remaining 19.9% stake in the separated Chrysler LLC.

The terms saw Daimler pay Cerberus US$650 million to take Chrysler and associated liabilities off its hands. Of the US$7.4 billion purchase price, Cerberus Capital Management was to invest US$5 billion in Chrysler Holdings and US$1.05 billion in Chrysler's financial unit. The de-merged Daimler AG received US$1.35 billion directly from Cerberus but directly invested US$2 billion in Chrysler itself. Chrysler filed bankruptcy in 2009.

DC Aviation rose in 2007 from the previous DaimlerChrysler Aviation, an auxiliary of DaimlerChrysler AG, which was established in 1998.

=== 2007–2022: Daimler AG ===
Daimler AG logo, 2007–2022

In May 2010, the Shenzhen BYD Daimler New Technology Co., Ltd., trading as "Denza" was established between BYD and Daimler to produce luxury electric vehicles.

In November 2014, Daimler announced it would acquire 25 percent of Italian motorcycle producer MV Agusta for an undisclosed fee. MV Holding acquired the 25 percent of MV Agusta back from Daimler in December 2017.

On 3 August 2015, Nokia announced that it had reached a deal to sell its Here digital maps division to a consortium of three German automakers—BMW, Daimler AG, and Volkswagen Group, for €2.8 billion. This was seen as an indication that the automakers were interested in automated cars.

In 2017, Daimler announced a series of acquisitions and partnerships with car startups focused on car sharing, in a move towards what it sees as the next generation of car ownership and usage. Part of its corporate strategy is to "transition from being an automobile manufacturer to a mobility services provider".

In April 2017 it announced a partnership with Via, a New York–based ride-sharing app, to launch a new ride-sharing service across Europe. In September, it was announced that Daimler had led a fundraising round for car-sharing start up Turo, which is a platform that lets owners rent their vehicles out to other users. It also acquired Flinc, a German startup that has built an app for peer-to-peer-style carpooling, has invested in Storedot, Careem, Blacklane, and FlixBus. It has also acquired car2go and mytaxi (now Free Now).

Li Shufu of Chinese automobile manufacturer Geely took a 9.69% stake in the company, through Tenaciou3 Prospect Investment Limited, in February 2018, making it the company's largest single shareholder. Geely is already known from its ownership of Volvo Car Corporation. In September 2018, Daimler invested $155 million in US-based electric bus and its battery management technology manufacturer Proterra.

In July 2019, BAIC Group purchased a 5% stake in Daimler, which is a reciprocal shareholder in BAIC's Hong Kong listed subsidiary. In September 2019, Daimler announced that it would be "stopping its internal combustion engine development initiatives as part of its efforts to embrace electric vehicles." In February 2020, Daimler partnered with Twelve to create the world's first C-pillar made with polycarbonate from CO_{2} electrolysis in an effort towards a fully carbon neutral fleet. In September 2020, the company was fined 875 million dollars by the United States for having violated the Clean Air Act. It agreed to pay $1.5 billion to settle all related court actions.

In February 2021, Daimler said it planned to rename itself adopting the name of its flagship marque, Mercedes-Benz, and spun off its heavy commercial vehicles unit, Daimler Truck, into a separate listed company. Daimler Truck is listed on the Frankfurt Stock Exchange and its first trading day was on 10 December 2021. In the 2021 review of WIPO's annual World Intellectual Property Indicators Daimler ranked 8th in the world, with 65 of its designs in industrial design registrations being published under the Hague System during 2020. This position is up on its previous 10th-place ranking in 2019.

=== Since 2022: Mercedes-Benz Group ===
On 28 January 2022, CEO Ola Källenius announced that Daimler would change its name to Mercedes-Benz to pursue a higher valuation for the company as it shifts deeper into high-tech electric vehicles. On 1 February 2022, Daimler officially changed its registered company name to Mercedes-Benz Group AG.

Sales of Mercedes-Benz Group vehicles in 2023 totaled 2,491,600, up 1.5% over the previous year. Sales of superior products increased: Mercedes-Maybach (+19%), G-Class (+11%) and Mercedes-AMG (+4%). Fully electric Mercedes-Benz passenger car sales rose by 73% during the year. Only Core segment sales declined by 2%, with 1,096,800 units sold due to supplier bottlenecks and the transition to the new E-Class.

In January 2026, the company was reported to be among the top 30 global investors in research and development (R&D) in 2025. In July 2026, amid the Dieselgate scandal, British courts dismissed the allegations against five manufacturers, including Mercedes, ruling in their favor.

== Corporate affairs ==
=== Business trends ===
The key trends for the Mercedes-Benz Group are (as at the financial year ending 31 December):

Year	Revenue (€ bn)	Net Income (€ bn)	Assets (€ bn)	Number of employees (k)	Deliveries (m) (Note: including Mercedes-Benz Cars and Mercedes-Benz Vans)
2012	114	6.0	162	275	2.1
2013	117	6.8	168	274	2.3
2014	129	6.9	189	279	2.5
2015	149	8.4	217	284	3.0
2016	153	8.5	242	282	2.9
2017	164	10.5	255	289	3.2
2018	167	7.2	281	298	3.3
2019	172	2.3	302	298	3.3
2020	154	3.6	285	288	2.8
2021	133	23.0	259	250	2.3
2022	150	14.5	260	171	2.4
2023	153	14.2	263	168	2.4
2024	146	10.2	265	179	2.4
2025	132	5.1	255	169	2.2

=== Management ===
Ola Källenius became the Chairman of Mercedes-Benz Group and Head of Mercedes-Benz Cars on 22 May 2019. As of May 2018, the members of the Board of Management of Mercedes-Benz Group AG were:

- Ola Källenius: Chairman of the Board of Management of Mercedes-Benz Group AG and Mercedes-Benz AG.
- Renata Jungo Brüngger: Integrity and Legal Affairs.
- Jörg Burzer: Production and Supply Chain Management.
- Sabine Kohleisen: Human Resources and Director of Labor Relations.
- Markus Schäfer: Chief Technology Officer responsible for Development and Purchasing.
- Britta Seeger: Mercedes-Benz Cars Marketing and Sales.
- Hubertus Troska: Greater China.
- Harald Wilhelm: Finance and Controlling and Head of Mercedes-Benz Mobility.

=== 2025 shareholder structure ===
The following structure is based on The German Federal Financial Supervisory Authority (BaFin) and Mercedes-Benz's site data.

- BAIC Group: a Chinese state-owned automobile manufacturer 9.98%
- Li Shufu with Tenaciou3 Prospect Investment Limited: 9.69%
- Morgan Stanley: 7.87%
- Kuwait Investment Authority: 5.57%
- BlackRock: 5.35%
- Retail investors: 32.23%
- Institutional investors: 29.31

=== EADS shareholding ===
In March 2010, Daimler owned a 22.5% share of EADS.

In April 2013, Daimler sold its shares in EADS, and the same year, EADS restructured itself into a new aerospace company named Airbus.

=== Leadership ===
==== Daimler-Benz AG (1926–1998) ====
- Wilhelm Kissel (1926–1942)
- Wilhelm Haspel (1942–1952)
- Heinrich C. Wagner (1952)
- Fritz Koenecke (1952–1960)
- Walter Hitzinger (1961–1966)
- Joachim Zahn (1966–1979)
- Gerhard Prinz (1980–1983)
- Werner Breitschwerdt (1983–1987)
- Edzard Reuter (1987–1995)
- Jürgen E. Schrempp (1995–1998)

==== DaimlerChrysler AG (1998–2007) ====
- Jürgen E. Schrempp (1998–2006)
  - Robert James Eaton (co-CEO, 1998–2000)
- Dieter Zetsche (2006–2007)

==== Daimler AG (2007–2022) ====
- Dieter Zetsche (2007–2019)
- Ola Källenius (2019–2022)

==== Mercedes-Benz Group AG (since 2022) ====
- Ola Källenius (since 2022)

=== North Charleston expansion ===
On 5 March 2015, Daimler AG announced a 1,200-job package to the North Charleston region for its van plant, to allow the company to start manufacturing Mercedes-Benz Sprinter vans from scratch to meet demand in North America. From 2010, these vans were set up in Germany, then shipped to the United States partially disassembled for reassembly to avoid import tariffs. A Daimler official said that the Sprinter's popularity in North America was making that process less efficient. The North Charleston plant had been employing only 100 workers. The Sprinter is available on the U.S. market as a panel van, crew bus and chassis in several variants with three lengths and roof heights, six-cylinder diesel or gasoline engines. The Sprinter has been assembled and sold in the United States since 2001.

== Brands ==
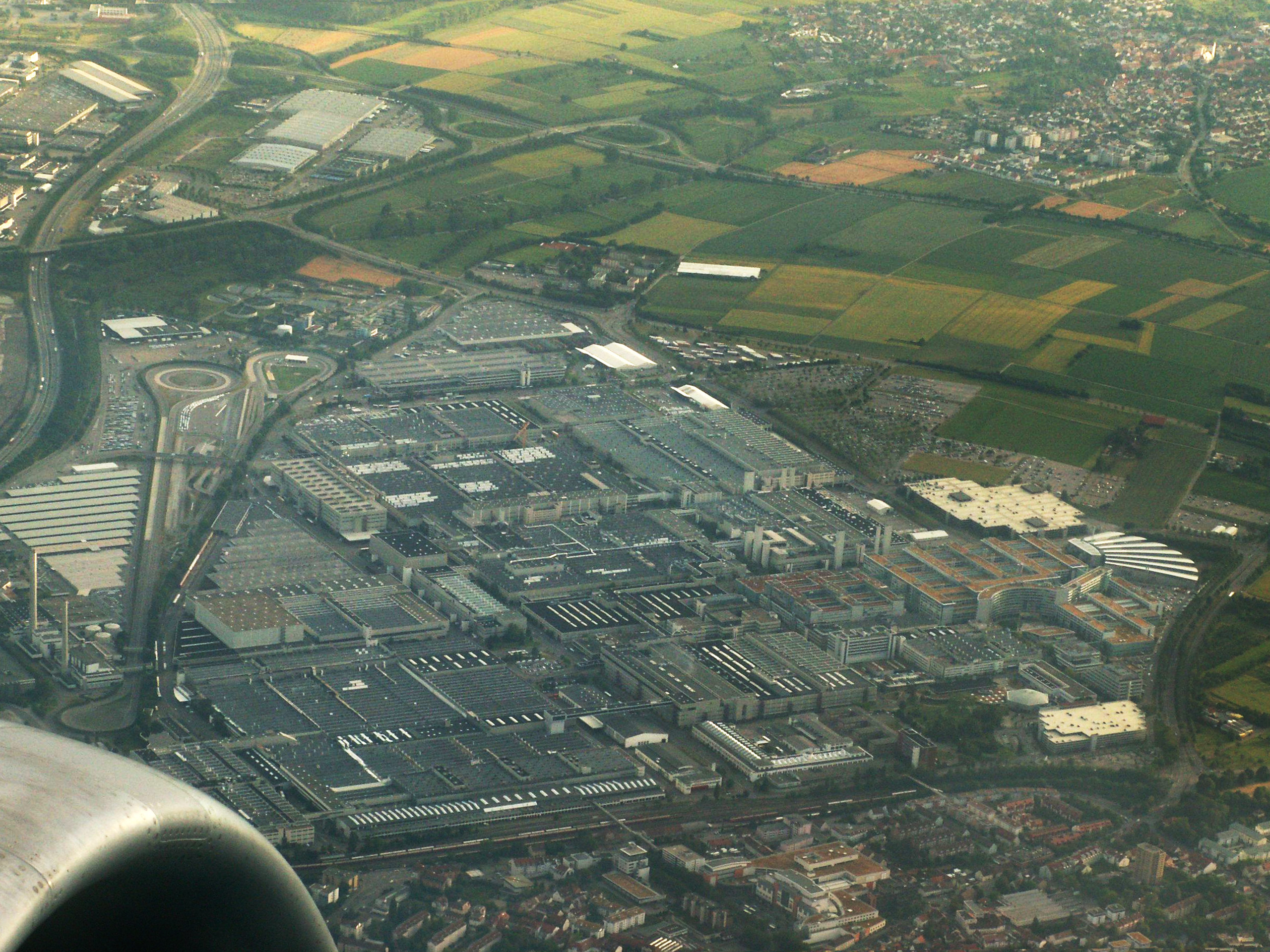
The largest Mercedes-Benz plant is in Sindelfingen, Germany.

Sales by business unit (2023)
Region	share
Mercedes-Benz Cars	70.4%
Mercedes-Benz Mobility	16.8%
Mercedes-Benz Vans	12.8%

The Mercedes-Benz Group sells automobiles under the following brands worldwide:

- Mercedes-Benz Cars
  - Mercedes-Benz
  - Mercedes-AMG – High performance vehicles
  - Mercedes-Maybach – Introduced in November 2014, previously sold as Maybach until 2012
  - Smart
- Mercedes-Benz Vans
  - Mercedes-Benz (vans group)
- Mercedes-Benz Mobility
  - Mercedes-Benz Bank
  - Mercedes-Benz Financial Services
- Others
  - Mercedes AMG High Performance Powertrains (builds engines for Formula One racing)

=== Former ===
- Share Now - Now part of Stellantis

== Locations ==
The Mercedes-Benz Group has a worldwide network of production plants and research centers. The following list describes all locations around the world.

City	Country	Purpose	Employees (Note: As of January 2024)	Founded	Company
Affalterbach	Germany	AMG engines	2,600	1967	Mercedes-AMG GmbH
Beijing	China	A-Class LWB, C-Class LWB, E-Class LWB, GLA, EQA, GLB, GLC L Auman trucks (assembly); Four-cylinder engines (production & assembly), six-cylinder engines (assembly)	12,700	2005	Beijing Benz Automotive Co., Ltd
Bengaluru	India	Research and Development	5,800	1996	Mercedes-Benz India Pvt Ltd
Berlin	Germany	Various engines, components, transmission parts and fuel systems	2,000	1902	Mercedes-Benz Group AG
Bogor	Indonesia	A-Class, C-Class, E-Class, S-Class, GLA, GLC, GLE, GLS	700	1982	Inchcape Indomobil Manufacturing Indonesia
Bremen	Germany	C-Class, CLE, GLC, SL, EQE	11,500	1938	Mercedes-Benz Group AG
Buenos Aires	Argentina	Sprinter; Chassis	2,000	1951	Mercedes-Benz Argentina S.A.U.
Charleston, South Carolina	United States	Sprinter	1,700	2006	Mercedes-Benz Vans, LLC
Düsseldorf	Germany	Sprinter	5,600	1962	Mercedes-Benz Group AG
East London	South Africa	C-Class (sedan)	3,000	1948	Mercedes-Benz South Africa (Pty) Ltd.
Fuzhou	China	Vito, V-Class, Sprinter	2,600	2007	Fujian Benz Automotive Co., Ltd.
Hamburg	Germany	Axles and axle components, steering columns, components for exhaust emission technology and lightweight structural parts	2,100	1935	Mercedes-Benz Group AG
Juiz de Fora	Brazil	A-Class, C-Class, Trucks (Accelo, Actros, Atego, Arocs)	1,021	1999	Mercedes-Benz do Brasil Ltd.
Kecskemét	Hungary	A-Class, B-Class, CLA & EQB	4,500	2008	Mercedes-Benz Manufacturing Hungary Kft.
Kölleda	Germany	Four-cylinder petrol engines & four- and six-cylinder diesel engines	1,200	2002	Mercedes-Benz Group AG
Ludwigsfelde	Germany	Sprinter	2,000	1936	Mercedes-Benz Group AG
Pekan	Malaysia	A-Class, C-Class, E-Class, S-Class, EQS, GLA, GLC, GLE	-	2005	HICOM Automotive Manufacturers (Malaysia) Sdn. Bhd.
Pune	India	C-Class, E-Class, GLE, S-Class, EQS, Research and Development	1,000	1994	Mercedes-Benz India Pvt Ltd
Rastatt	Germany	A-Class, B-Class & GLA, EQA	6,100	1992	Mercedes-Benz Group AG
Samut Prakan	Thailand	C-Class, E-Class, S-Class, GLC, GLE, GLS	78	1998	Thonburi Automotive Assembly Plant Co., Ltd.
Sao Bernardo do Campo	Brazil	Trucks (Accelo, Atego, Atron, Axor and Actros), Aggregates (engines, axles, transmission) and bus chassis, Technological Development Center (research, Industry 4.0)	5,000	1956	Mercedes-Benz do Brasil Ltda.
Sao Bernardo do Campo	Brazil	Sprinter	650	2020	Mercedes-Benz Cars & Vans Brasil Ltd.
Sindelfingen	Germany	E-Class (sedan and estate), S-Class, EQS, GT, Research and Development	21,500 (Note: Excluding employees in research and development)	1915	Mercedes-Benz Group AG
Stuttgart	Germany	Company headquarters Engines, axles, transmissions & other components Pre-commissioning foundry and forge Research and development	17,973	1904	Mercedes-Benz Group AG
Vance, Alabama	United States	GLE, GLS, EQE SUV, EQS SUV	6,100	1995	Mercedes-Benz U.S. International Inc.
Vitoria-Gasteiz	Spain	Vito, V-Class	4,700	1954	Mercedes-Benz Espana, S.A.U.

== Holdings ==
In 2015, Daimler held interests in the following companies:

- 89.29% Mitsubishi Fuso Truck and Bus Corporation of Japan
- 12% Beijing Automotive Group (BAIC)
- 15% KAMAZ of Russia
- 20% Aston Martin Lagonda

Until the end of 2011, the company had also held shares in McLaren Group. Daimler held 25% of MV Agusta of Italy until 2017. Daimler sold its 50% stake in Engine Holding, to its joint venture partner, Rolls-Royce Holdings in 2014. It is now called Rolls-Royce Power Systems AG. Daimler used to own 50.1% Automotive Fuel Cell Cooperation of Canada but the joint venture was closed in 2018.

=== Joint ventures and alliances ===
Sales by region (2024)
Region	share
Europe	25.5%
United States	24.0%
China	15.9%
Germany	14.9%
Asia (without China)	11.3%
Other markets	5.7%
North America (without US)	2.8%

==== FAW and later Beijing Automotive Group ====
From 1986 to 1989, Daimler produced the Mercedes-Benz W123 (200 and 230E) sedans in China under a joint venture with FAW Group, with 828 units assembled in Changchun.

Beijing Jeep was a joint venture between Chrysler and BAIC Motor. After DaimlerChrysler was formed, its legal name was changed to Beijing Benz in 2004, and it started producing Mercedes-Benz models in 2006. The partnership has continued during the Daimler AG era.

In February 2013, Daimler acquired a 12% stake in BAIC Motor, becoming the first western car manufacturer to own a stake in a Chinese company. Daimler works with China's Beiqi Foton (a subsidiary of BAIC) to build Auman trucks.

==== Force Motors ====
Daimler has partnered with Force Motors since the 1950s, they let Force Motors use the OM616 on the Force Gurkha and Trax.

==== Fujian Benz ====
In 2007 Daimler created a joint venture with Fujian Motors Group and China Motor Corporation and created Fujian Benz (originally Fujian Daimler Automotive Co.).

==== SsangYong Motors ====
Between 1990 and 2010 SsangYong partnered with Daimler-Benz. The deal was for SsangYong to develop an SUV with Mercedes-Benz technology. This was supposedly to allow SsangYong to gain footholds in new markets without having to build their own infrastructure (utilizing existing Mercedes-Benz networks) while giving Mercedes a competitor in the then-booming SUV market. This resulted in the Musso, which was sold first by Mercedes-Benz and later by SsangYong. SsangYong further benefited from this alliance, long after Daimler-Benz stopped selling the Musso, producing a badge engineered version of the Mercedes-Benz MB100, the Istana and using Daimler designs in many other models, including the second-generation Korando (engine and transmission), the Rexton (transmission), the Chairman H (chassis and transmission) and the Kyron (transmission).

Ssangyong Also Partnered with Daewoo Motors to sell the chairman, Korando, Istana, and Musso to the rest of South Korea and Asia, Ssangyong later partnered with SAIC (Roewe) to rebadge the Chairman W in china as the Roewe R95/850 and the Kyron as Roewe W5 and also use the Mercedes-Benz 5G-Tronic transmission for the W5, SAIC has been working with Daimler since the 1964 with the Shanghai SH760 using a modified W121 chassis. Micro another company that rebadged Ssangyong's like Kyron, Actyon and Rexton using Mercedes-Benz engines.

==== Renault-Nissan-Mitsubishi and Daimler Alliance ====
On 7 April 2010, Renault-Nissan executives, Carlos Ghosn and Dieter Zetsche, announced an intercourse between the three companies. The first fruits of the alliance in 2012 included engine sharing (Infiniti Q50 utilising Mercedes diesel engines) and a re-badged Renault Kangoo being sold as a Mercedes-Benz Citan.

== Alternative propulsion ==
=== Electric ===
Daimler AG and the utility company RWE AG were set in 2009 to begin a joint electric car and charging station test project in the German capital, Berlin, called "E-Mobility Berlin."

Following trials in 2007 and then with Tesla in 2009, Daimler is building a production Smart electric drive car using Tesla's battery technology. Daimler temporarily invested in Tesla, saving it from bankruptcy. Daimler's joint venture with BYD has resulted in the creation of the new brand Denza.

In 2016, Daimler subsidiary ACCUMOTIVE announced their stationary batteries, to store up to 20 kWh of solar power for later use. Daimler plans to invest €1.5 billion in battery technology, and unveiled a factory in Kamenz in May 2017.

In September 2019, Daimler redirected its internal combustion engine development initiatives to focus on electric vehicle technologies, leaving electric propulsion rather less of an "alternative" and more the Daimler mainline. Their Research and Development department has developed a compostable battery that uses graphene-based organic cell chemistry. This means that no rare, toxic metals are needed for the battery, which makes it 100% recyclable.

Since 2019, fully electric cars have been released through the Mercedes-EQ brand.

=== Fuel cell ===
Daimler has been involved with fuel cell vehicle development for some time, with a number of research and concept vehicles shown and demonstrated, the first being the 2002 Mercedes-Benz F-Cell car and the Mercedes-Benz Citaro hydrogen bus. In 2013, the Renault-Nissan/Daimler alliance was joined by Ford to further develop the fuel cell technology with an aim for production by 2017.

=== Hybrid ===
Mercedes-Benz launched its first passenger car model equipped with a hybrid drive system in summer 2009, the Mercedes-Benz S-Class 400 Hybrid. and the Citaro Hybrid bus in 2007. Daimler Trucks and Mitusbishi Fuso have also trialed various hybrid models including the Mitsubishi Fuso Canter Eco Hybrid and Mitsubishi Fuso Aero Star Aero Star Eco Hybrid bus.

=== Biofuel research ===
Daimler AG is involved in a joint project with Archer Daniels Midland Company and Bayer CropScience to develop the semi-evergreen shrub jatropha curcas as a biofuel.

== Formula One ==
On 16 November 2009, Daimler and Aabar Investments purchased a 75.1% stake in Brawn GP (Daimler holding 45.1%). The company was rebranded as Mercedes GP with its base in Brackley, UK and Ross Brawn remaining team principal. The Brawn purchase led to Daimler selling back its stake in McLaren in stages, completed in 2011. Mercedes continued to provide sponsorship and engines to McLaren until 2014.

Prior to the 2011 season, Daimler and Aabar Investments purchased the remaining 24.9% stake owned by the team management in February 2011. In November 2012, Aabar Investments sold its remaining shares, leaving the team (rebranded as Mercedes AMG Petronas F1 Team) wholly Daimler-owned. Daimler also owns Mercedes AMG High Performance Powertrains which, as of 2024, supplied engines to Aston Martin, Williams, and McLaren, in addition to Mercedes AMG Petronas.

== O-Bahn ==
The O-Bahn system was conceived by Daimler-Benz to enable buses to avoid traffic congestion by sharing tram tunnels in the German city of Essen. However, the project did not materialise there; the project was built in the Australian city of Adelaide.

== Bribery and corruption ==
On 1 April 2010, Daimler AG's German and Russian subsidiaries each pleaded guilty to two counts of bribery charges brought by the U.S. Justice Department and the U.S. Securities and Exchange Commission. The parent company made a US$185 million settlement, but the company and its Chinese subsidiary remained subject to a two-year deferred prosecution agreement requiring further cooperation with regulators, adherence to internal controls and meeting other terms before final sentencing. Daimler would face harsher penalties should it fail to meet the terms of the agreement during the two-year period. Additionally, Louis J. Freeh, a former director of the Federal Bureau of Investigation, served as an independent monitor to oversee Daimler's compliance with anti-bribery laws.

U.S. prosecutors accused key executives of Daimler, Daimler subsidiaries, and Daimler affiliates of illegally showering foreign officials with money and gifts between 1998 and 2008 to secure government contracts around the world. The investigation for the case revealed that Daimler improperly paid some $56 million in bribes related to more than 200 transactions in at least 22 countries (including China, Russia, Turkey, Hungary, Greece, Latvia, Serbia and Montenegro, Egypt, and Nigeria, among other places) that, in return, awarded the company $1.9 billion in revenue and at least $91.4 million in illegal profits.

The SEC case was sparked in 2004 after David Bazzetta, a former auditor at then DaimlerChrysler Corp, filed a whistleblower complaint after he was fired for raising questions about bank accounts controlled by Mercedes-Benz units in South America. Bazzetta alleged that he learned in a July 2001 corporate audit executive committee meeting in Stuttgart that business units "continued to maintain secret bank accounts to bribe foreign government officials", though the company knew the practice violated U.S. laws.

In another attempt to silence Bazzetta, Daimler later offered to settle his termination of employment suit out of court and he eventually accepted a settlement. But Daimler's strategy with Bazzetta proved to be a failure as the U.S. criminal investigation for violating anti-bribery laws was already underway in what has been one of the most wide-ranging cases brought against a foreign corporation.

According to the charges, the bribes were frequently made by over-invoicing customers and paying the excess back to top government officials or their proxies. The bribes also took the form of luxury European vacations, armored Mercedes vehicles for high-ranking government officials and a birthday gift to the dictator of Turkmenistan, Turkmenbashi (Saparmurat Niyazov), including a golden box and 10,000 copies of his personal manifesto, Ruhnama, translated into German.

Investigators also found that the firm violated the terms of the United Nations' Oil-for-Food Programme with Iraq by giving kickbacks worth 10% of the contract values to officials within the Iraqi government, then led by Saddam Hussein. The SEC said the company made more than $4 million in profit from the sale of vehicles and spare parts in the corrupt oil-for-food deals.

U.S. prosecutors further alleged that some bribes were paid through shell companies based in the U.S. "In some cases Daimler wired these improper payments to U.S. bank accounts or to the foreign bank accounts of U.S. shell companies in order to transmit the bribe", the court papers said.

Prosecutors said that Daimler engaged in a "long-standing practice" of paying bribes, due in part to a corporate culture that encouraged the practice.

"Using offshore bank accounts, third-party agents and deceptive pricing practices, [Daimler AG, its subsidiaries and its affiliates] saw foreign bribery as a way of doing business," said Mythili Raman, a principal deputy in the Justice Department's criminal division.

"It is no exaggeration to describe corruption and bribe-paying at Daimler as a standard business practice", Robert Khuzami, director of the SEC's enforcement division, said in a statement.

As per the agreement with prosecutors, the two Daimler subsidiaries admitted to knowingly violating the Foreign Corrupt Practices Act, which bars companies and their officials from paying bribes to foreign officials to win business. The Foreign Corrupt Practices Act applies to any company that lists its shares on U.S. stock exchanges. Daimler AG was listed with the symbol "DAI" on the New York Stock Exchange, giving the Justice Department jurisdiction over the German car maker's payments in countries around the globe. Judge Richard J. Leon of the United States District Court in Washington, D.C., approved the plea agreement and settlement, calling it a "just resolution." Daimler AG agreed to settle for $2.2 billion to US and California state regulators.

== Labor relations ==
=== United States ===
In March 2024, workers at the Mercedes-Benz plant in Tuscaloosa County, Alabama filed charges against the company with the US National Labor Relations Board (NLRB), accusing the company of illegally disciplining workers at the plant in retaliation for organizing with the United Auto Workers (UAW) labor union. In May 2024, following the loss of a unionization vote at the plant, the UAW filed a formal complaint with the NLRB seeking a new election due to what it called "wanton lawlessness" on the part of Mercedes-Benz in the run up to the election, with the UAW accusing the company of holding anti-union captive audience meetings, targeting pro-union workers for drug tests, and illegally terminating UAW supporters.
