= Tempo (disambiguation) =

Tempo is the speed or pace of a musical piece.

Tempo may also refer to:

== Vehicles ==
- Tempo (bus rapid transit), a bus rapid transit system in Oakland, California
- Tempo (car brand), a German manufacturer of automobiles
- Tempo (railcar), a Canadian railway car type
- Tempo (motorcycle manufacturer), a Norwegian moped and motorcycle manufacturer company
- Ford Tempo, a compact car produced by Ford from the 1984 through 1994 model years
- Optare Tempo, a type of bus built by Optare
- Tecma F1 Tempo, a French hang glider design by Tecma Sport
- Tempo Group, Chinese automotive components manufacturer
- Force Motors, formerly Bajaj Tempo, an Indian vehicle manufacturer

== Publications ==
- Tempo (journal), a British peer-reviewed journal about contemporary music established in 1939
- Tempo (newspaper), a German daily newspaper published in Berlin from 1928–1933
- Tempo (Indonesian magazine), a weekly political magazine established in 1971
- Tempo (Italian magazine), an illustrated news magazine published 1939–1976
- Tempo (Mozambique magazine), a defunct weekly magazine published in Portuguese East Africa in the 1970s
- Tempo (Serbian magazine), an illustrated sports magazine published in Belgrade 1966–2004
- Tempo (Turkish magazine), a lifestyle magazine published in Istanbul 1987–2016
- Il Tempo, an Italian daily newspaper published in Rome since 1944
- Koran Tempo, a daily newspaper in Indonesia
- Tempo, a Nigerian publication by P.M. News
- Tempo, a Philippine tabloid published by the Manila Bulletin Group

== Food and beverages ==
- Cadburys Tempo, a chocolate bar in South Africa
- Tempo Beer Industries, an Israeli brewer

== Games ==
- Tempo (chess), an effect of one move in a game of chess
- Tempo (bridge), the advantage of being on lead in the game of bridge
- Tempo (video game), a 1995 video game for the Sega 32X
- Tempo Storm, a professional video gaming/esports team

== Places ==
- Tempo, County Fermanagh, a village in County Fermanagh, Northern Ireland
- Tempo, Ontario, a small former neighbourhood in London, Ontario, Canada

== Arts and entertainment ==
- Tempo (single album), by Minho
- "Tempo", a song from Blue's Big Musical Movie
- "Tempo" (Chris Brown song)
- "Tempo" (Exo song)
- "Tempo" (Lizzo song)
- "Tempo" (Margaret song)
- Tempo (film), a 2003 film set primarily in Paris

== Television and radio ==
- Tempo (radio show), a classical music radio show on CBC Radio 2
- Tempo FM, an easy listening-oriented radio station based in Wetherby, England
- Tempo Networks, a US-based Caribbean television network
- Tempo (RFO), a defunct French television channel

== People ==
- Michael Tempo, American musician
- Nino Tempo (1935–2025), American musician, singer, and actor
- Roberto Tempo (1956–2017), Italian scientist
- Svetozar Vukmanović-Tempo, Montenegrin communist
- Tempo (rapper) (born 1977), Puerto Rican rapper
- T.O.P (rapper) (born 1987), South Korean rapper who formerly used Tempo as a stage name
- Tempo Giusto (composer) (born 1986), Finnish DJ and composer

== Business ==
- Tempo Records (disambiguation), two different historical record companies
- Tempo Centar, a hypermarket chain in Serbia
- Tempo Discount Department Stores, a discount department store chain that was part of the conglomerate Gamble-Skogmo
- Tempo (handkerchief brand), a German handkerchief brand
- Tempo is a brand of motor fuel owned by Federated Co-operatives

== Other uses ==
- Tempo (astronomy), a program that determines pulsar parameters from timing observations
- Tempo (app), an artificial intelligence-enhanced calendar application for iOS
- Tempo (character), a Marvel Comics character
- Tempo (typeface), a 1930 sans-serif typeface
- TEMPO, a chemical compound: 2,2,6,6-tetramethylpiperidine-1-oxy radical
- Acer Tempo, a smartphone series
- Tropospheric Emissions: Monitoring of Pollution, spectrometer attached to a satellite
- Tempo, an open-source distributed tracing platform available through Grafana
- Tempo Video, a defunct British children's home video label
- Toronto Tempo, a women's professional basketball team in the WNBA

== See also ==
- Tiempo (disambiguation)
