= Force Trax =

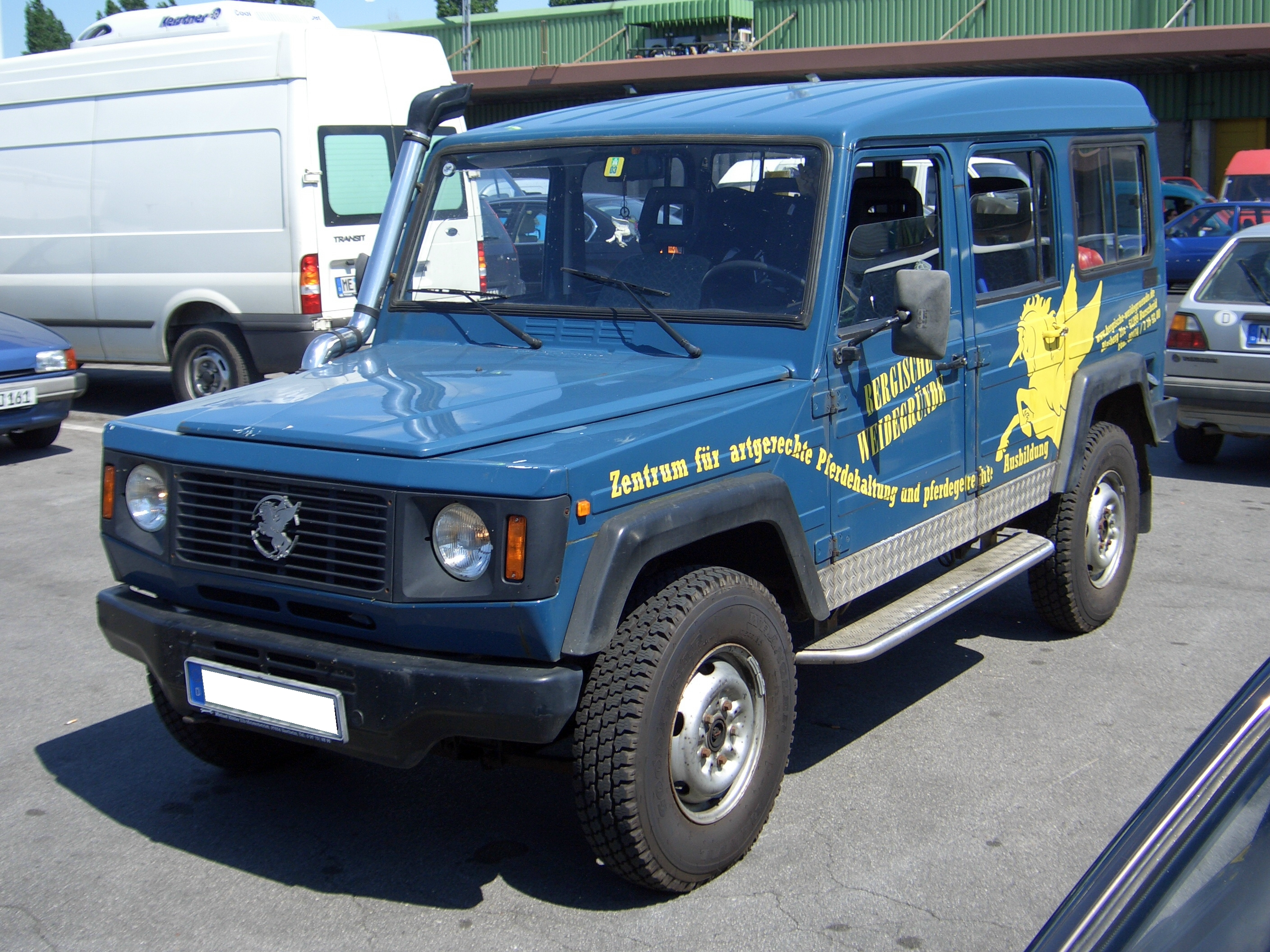

Overview
- Manufacturer: Force Motors
- Production: 1988-present

Body and chassis
- Class: SUV; Van; Pickup truck
- Layout: Front engine, rear-wheel-drive Front-engine, four-wheel drive

Powertrain
- Engine: 2.4 L OM616 diesel I4; 2.4 L OM616 turbodiesel I4; 2.6 L TD 2650 F diesel I4; 2.6 L TD 2650 FTI turbodiesel I4
- Transmission: 5-speed manual High/low-range for 4x4 versions

Dimensions
- Wheelbase: 2,400–3,050 mm (94–120 in)
- Length: 3,882–5,032 mm (153–198 in)
- Width: 1,660 mm (65 in)
- Height: 2,055–2,105 mm (81–83 in)
- Curb weight: 1,460–1,760 kg (3,219–3,880 lb)

The Trax is a series of "Multi Utility Vehicles" (MUVs) built by Force Motors in Pune, India (the company was called "Bajaj Tempo" at the time of introduction). There has also been an SUV version called the Gama, especially aimed at private buyers, while the vehicle also receives many additional names such as Cruiser and Judo.

The vehicles are of simple and durable construction, suited for the severe conditions found in the Indian countryside. Originally there were three models; the Town and Country, the Trax Challenger, and the Pick-up. In 1998, the four-wheel drive "Tempo Trax Gurkha" was introduced, originally aimed mostly at military users. Since then, a plethora of versions have appeared: open-top SUVs, comparatively luxurious station wagons, dropside pickups ("Kargo King"), ambulances, vans, and many special bodies are offered on three different wheelbases of 2,400 mm (94 in), 3,030 mm (119 in) (Kargo King), or 3,050 mm (120 in). The Trax can hold up to 13 passengers in the LWB versions.

The engines used were originally versions of Mercedes-Benz OM616 2.4 litre four-cylinder diesel, with an available turbo version for the top-of-the-line Trax Gurkha, but these have been replaced by a larger 2.6 L (2,596 cc) TD 2650 F, still Mercedes derived. Power is 61 hp (45 kW) at 3,200 rpm, with a 75 hp (56 kW) turbocharged and intercooled version (TD 2650 FTI) used for the 4x4 Gurkha version.

== Tempo Trax Gurkha ==
The Tempo Trax Gurkha 4x4 was launched in 1998 by Bajaj Tempo to compete with the likes of the Tata Sierra and Safari. The Trax Gurkha was also showcased at the Auto Expo in both civilian and defense variants. The SUV featured a turbocharged 2.4 liter OM-616 diesel engine putting out 76 hp (57 kW) and 167 N⋅m (123 lb⋅ft) of torque BS II compliant supported by 5-speed manual transmission. The SUV was all-time all-wheel drive but with some distinctive feature from trax like power steering, heavy-duty transfer case, 7 seats, bumpers and guards which give it a different look than the normal Trax.

Later on in 2008 the Gurkha was launched as a new product under Force Motor and was no more part of the trax lineup. The run was short for about 2 years only and a limited number of units were made but in 2013 the Gurkha was again launched and is still on sale with 3 door and 5 door version with 2.6 litre diesel engine based on the OM-616 producing 140 hp (104 kW) and 320 N⋅m (236 lb⋅ft) of torque.

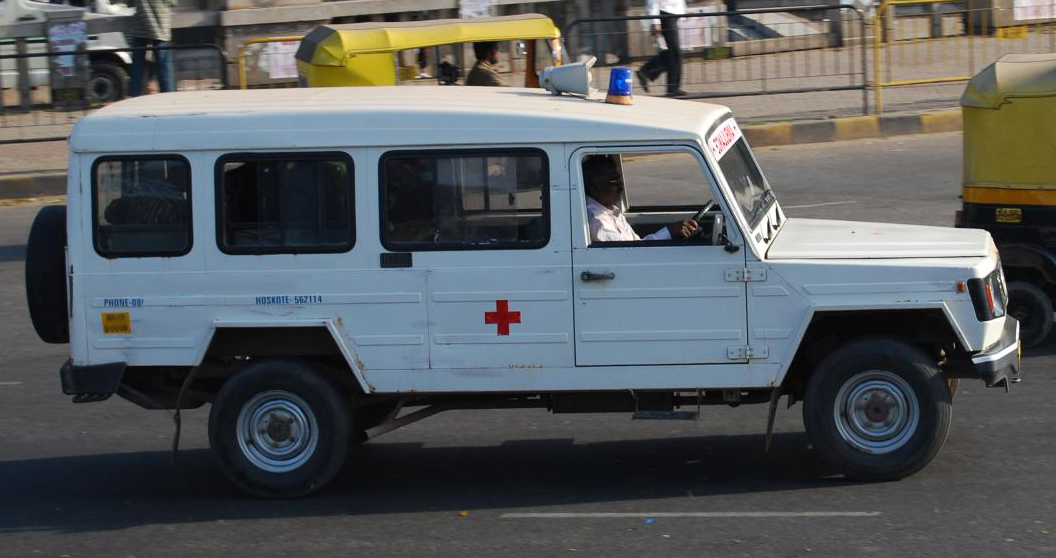
Tempo Trax ambulance (LWB)

== Powertrain ==
Model	Year	Size (L)	Power (Hp)	Torque (Nm)	Emission
OM-616	1988	2.4	58	137	Pre-BS
TD 2400	1998	2.4	76	167	BS II
TD 2400 FTI	1998	2.4	88	180	BS II
TD 2650	1990s	2.6	61	160	BS II
TD 2650 FTI	2000s	2.6	75	190	BS III
FM 2.6 CR	2020s	2.6	80	250	BS VI

== Markets ==
=== Philippines ===
During the world war there was huge shortage of the SUV chassis because of high defense demand in the Philippines. The trax features a long enough chassis, Off-road ability and load bearing capacity which made it ideal choice for commercial use. Morales Motors a Philippine automotive company imported the chassis from India and assembled the Trax in the Philippines and marketing it under name Togo Tracker.

=== USA ===
General Equipment a Miami based security equipment company had armored versions of Trax for sale called Armor Trax featuring Ballistic Protection, run flat tires, gun port, intercom system, heavy-duty bumper, Satellite tracker and more customization options with European Level B6 certification. To move with increased weight the SUV had a TD 3250 engine which was being used in Traveller van by Force Motors.They also had a civilian looking Trax version named Armor Judo which was not as heavily armored as the Armor Trax available in both left and right-hand drive options.

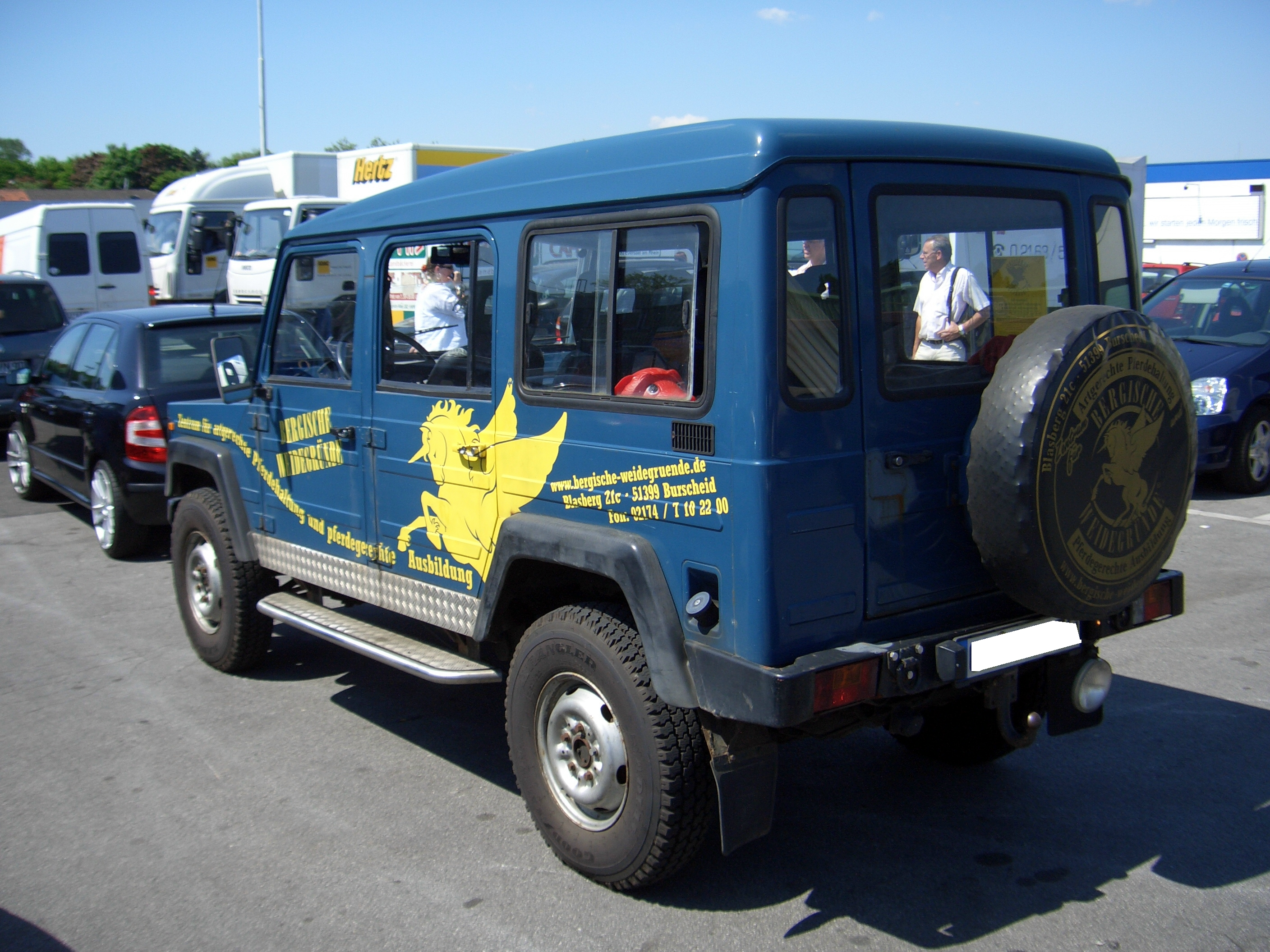
Tempo Trax

=== Germany ===
Fahrzeugvertriebsgesellschaft mbH an automotive company based in Weißenburg in Bayern imported Bajaj Tempo vehicles to Germany. Being low cost 4x4 off-road vehicle that met the Euro III emission standards the Trax had demand for imports. Versions like Gurkha, Judo, Pickup and some more were available for import while the Gurkha had modifications to meet the import rules. The close resemblance of Mercedes G class getting nickname of Indian G and feel of Land Rover Defender made it appealing to the recreational crowd as low budget alternative.

== See also ==
- Force Motors
- Force Gurkha
- Bajaj Auto
- Tempo
- Force One
