= Mercedes-Benz OM603 engine =

Mercedes-Benz OM603 Diesel
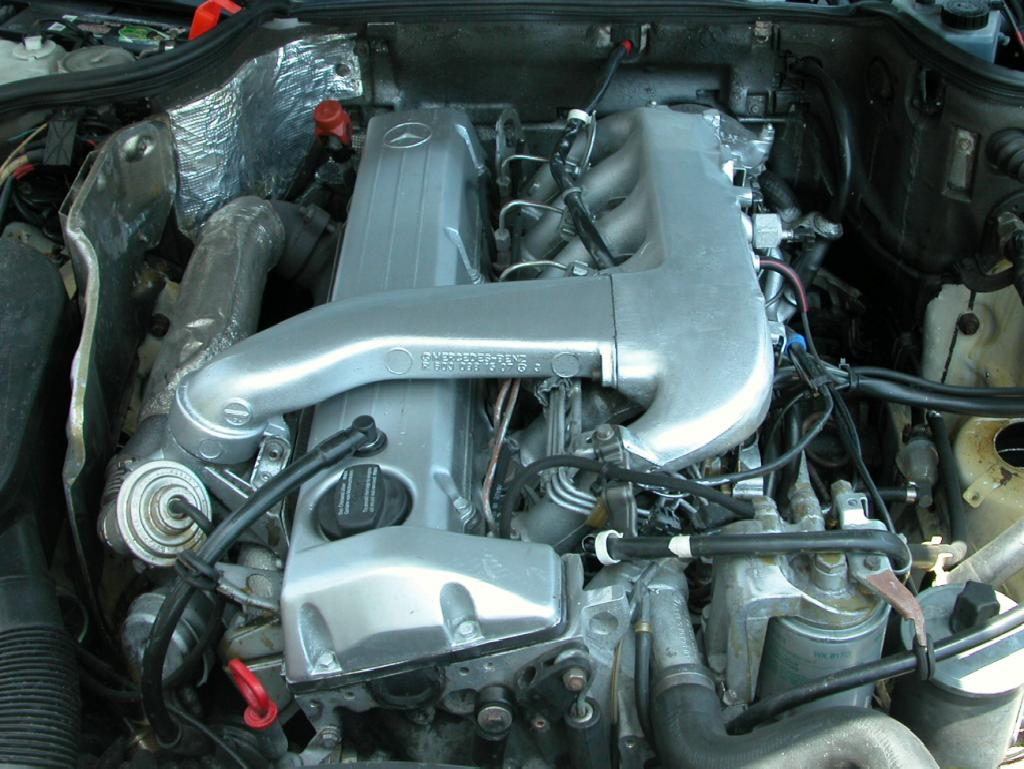

Overview
- Manufacturer: Daimler-Benz
- Production: 1986–1997

Layout
- Configuration: Inline-six engine
- Displacement: 3.0 L (2,996 cc); 3.4 L (3,449 cc)
- Cylinder bore: 87 mm (3.43 in); 89 mm (3.50 in)
- Piston stroke: 84 mm (3.31 in); 92.4 mm (3.64 in)
- Cylinder block material: Cast iron
- Cylinder head material: Aluminum
- Valvetrain: SOHC / 2 Valves per cyl.
- Compression ratio: 22.0:1

Combustion
- Turbocharger: No (.91x), Yes (.96x, .97x)
- Fuel system: Indirect fuel injection
- Fuel type: Diesel
- Oil system: Wet sump
- Cooling system: Water cooled

Output
- Power output: 81–111 kW (109–149 hp)
- Torque output: 185–310 N⋅m (136–229 lb⋅ft)

Dimensions
- Dry weight: 217 kg

Chronology
- Successor: Mercedes-Benz OM606

The OM603 engine is a straight-6 Diesel automobile engine from Mercedes-Benz used from 1984 through 1999. The OM603 saw use in W124, W126 and W140 model vehicles, as well as limited use in the Swedish Bandvagn BV206.

It is closely related to the 4 cylinder OM601 and the 5 cylinder OM602 engine families of the same era.

The 603.96 engine has a capacity of 2,996 cc (182.8 cu in) and was a development of the reliable 5 cylinder OM617 engine. It produced 143 hp at 4600 rpm (euro market without catalytic converter produced 148hp) and 195 ft.lb at 2400 rpm with a compression ratio of 22.0:1. Versions 603.96x and 603.97x are turbocharged. Only turbocharged models of the 603 series were available to the U.S. market. The single camshaft and injection pump are driven by duplex chain from the crankshaft. A separate single row chain drives the oil pump. The camshaft operated the valves via hydraulic bucket tappets; valve clearance adjustment is automatic.

Fuel is injected into a pre-combustion chamber. A Bosch M in-line injection pump is used, with a mechanical governor and vacuum-operated stop control. The pump is lubricated by a connection to the engine oil circulation and the fuel lift pump is mounted on the side of the injection pump. Preheating is by glow plugs with automatic control of preheating time.

The 603 engine had a diesel particulate filter, or trap oxidizer, in the US market. As these were mounted at the cylinder head (modern traps are mounted further away), heat from these trap oxidizers caused failure of the aluminum cylinder heads on the first generation of 603-engined vehicles; debris from the traps could also damage the turbocharger. This first version was sold in the US from 1986 to 1987. Daimler-Benz removed these traps for free, and if the turbocharger had been determined to be damaged it was also replaced. Even without the heat from the trap oxidizers, the original #14 mold cylinder heads were weak and if overheated could crack. In general, the later model #17 or #22 mold cylinder heads are considered to be the definitive cure for cracked heads.

In 1990 the 350SD/SDL debuted, using a larger-displacement 3496cc OM603.97 engine that had more torque and a lower top RPM. The engine lived on in the W140 chassis after the W126 production ended, as the 300SD or S350, with a larger yet turbocharger and thus more power and torque. By the time of the 3.5L engine, the cylinder head issues of early 3.0L engine (US 1986-1987) had been corrected. However, in the 3.5L there exists a different situation that appeared on some engines; eventual head gasket erosion, and thus passage of oil into the #1 cylinder. As the 3.0L engine uses the same head oil passage design, yet does not appear to exhibit the problem - it might be that the larger bore in the 3.5 engine, the higher pressures, and resulting smaller head gasket surface area could conspire to cause a gasket erosion issue.

== Versions of OM603 Mercedes 6-cylinder diesel engine ==
Model indication	Year	Engine no OM603...	Power in kW (hp)	Torque in Nm
OM 603.xxx (6-cylinder diesel)
W124 300 D	04/1985 -> 06/1993	.912	81 (109) @ 4600 rpm (<'89) or 84 (113) @ 4600 rpm (>'89)	185 @ 2800 rpm (<'89) or 191 @ 2800 - 3050 rpm
W124 300D Turbo	01/1987 -> 03/1996	.960 & .963 (4Matic)	106 (143) @ 4600 rpm (<'88) or 108 (147) @ 4600 rpm (>'88)	267 @ 2400 rpm (<'88) or 273 @ 2400 rpm (>'88)
W124 300TD Turbo	1987	.960	106 (143) @ 4600 rpm (<'88) or 108 (147) @ 4600 rpm (>'88)	267 @ 2400 rpm (<'88) or 273 @ 2400 rpm (>'88)
W126 300SDL	02/1985 -> 09/1987	.961	110 (148) @ 4600 rpm	273 @ 2400 rpm
W126 350SD/SDL	06/1990 -> 08/1991	.97x	100 (136) @ 4000 rpm	310 @ 2000 rpm
W140 300SD / S350	09/1991 -> 08/1996	.97x	111 (150) @ 4000 rpm	310 @ 2000 rpm
W463 G350 GD Turbo	1992 -> 1994	.972	100 (134) @ 4600 rpm	305 @ 1800 rpm
