= Tiempo =

Tiempo (the Spanish word for time) may refer to:

== Music ==
- Tiempo (album), a 2003 album by Erreway
- "Tiempo" (Cetu Javu song) (1994)
- "Tiempo" (Erreway song) (2003)
- "Tiempo" a song by Miranda! from Es Mentira (2002)

== Other uses ==
- Tiempo (magazine), a Spanish-language weekly
- Tiempo (programme), a programme relating to global warming

== People with the surname ==
- César Tiempo, (1906–1980), Russian-born screenwriter of Argentine cinema
- Edilberto K. Tiempo (1913–1996), Filipino writer and professor, husband of Edith
- Edith Tiempo (1919–2011), Filipina writer, wife of Edilberto
- Rowena Tiempo Torrevillas (born 1951), Filipina poet, fiction writer and essayist, daughter of Edilberto and Edith
- Sergio Tiempo (born 1972), Argentine classical pianist

== See also ==
- A Tiempo (disambiguation)
- El Tiempo (disambiguation)
- Mi tiempo, a 2007 album by Chayanne
- Nike Tiempo, a sports brand
- Nuevo Tiempo, a Spanish-language Christian TV and radio station for Central and South America
- Tempo (disambiguation)
