= El Tiempo =

El Tiempo, which means "time" or "the time" in Spanish, may refer to:

- El Tiempo (Colombia), a Colombian newspaper
- El Tiempo (Honduras), a Honduran newspaper
- El Tiempo (Ecuador), an Ecuadorian newspaper
- El Tiempo (Istanbul), a Ladino-language Turkish newspaper
- El Tiempo (Anzoátegui), a Venezuelan newspaper in Anzoátegui state
- El Tiempo (Trujillo), a Venezuelan newspaper in Trujillo state
- El Tiempo (United States), a Spanish-language U.S. newspaper
- El Tiempo (album), a 1994 album by Mexican singer Benny Ibarra

== See also ==
- Tiempo (disambiguation)
