= Force Gurkha =

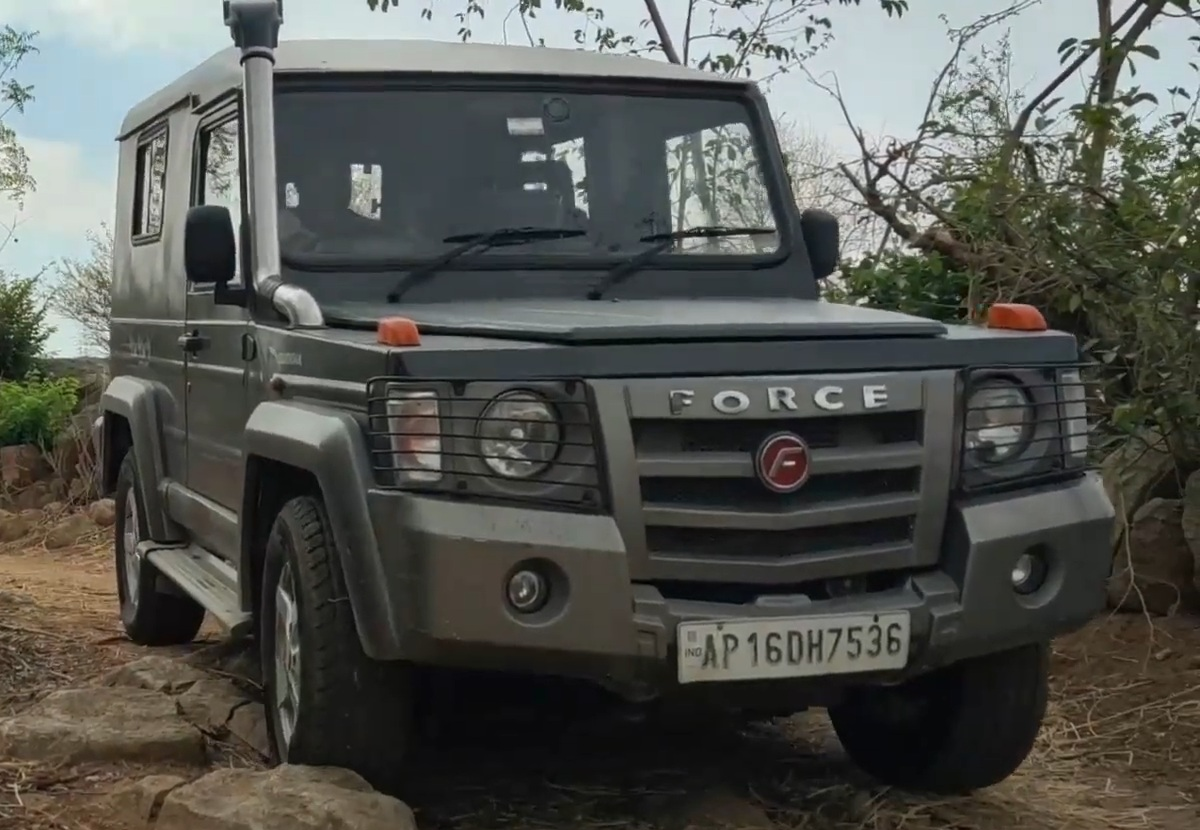

Overview
- Manufacturer: Force Motors
- Production: 2008–present First series (2008–2013); Second series (2013–2017); Third series (2017–2019); Fourth series (2021–present)
- Assembly: India: Pithampur, Madhya Pradesh

Body and chassis
- Class: Compact SUV
- Body style: 3/5-door SUV
- Layout: Front-engine, four-wheel-drive layout
- Doors: 3 Door & 5 door

Powertrain
- Engine: 2.6 OM616 diesel
- Power output: 140 hp (104 kW) at 3200 rpm
- Transmission: 5 speed – H Type manual

Dimensions
- Wheelbase: 2,400 mm (94 in)
- Length: 4,116 mm (162.0 in)
- Width: 1,812 mm (71.3 in)
- Height: 2,075 mm (81.7 in)
- Curb weight: 1,964 kg (4,330 lb)

The Force Gurkha is a compact SUV produced by Indian manufacturer Force Motors. The original and second generation Gurkha are produced as two-door SUVs with options of a removable hard or soft top. Standard equipment includes mechanical differential locks for the front and rear axles, a snorkel that allows it to drive through water 700 mm deep, and a transfer case with low ratios.

The Gurkha is popularly known as the "Indian G-Wagon" due to its resemblance to the Mercedes-Benz G-Class.

Force Motors has received an order of 2,978 units of the Gurkha from the Indian Defence Forces. These vehicles will be tailored to meet the diverse operational requirements of both the Indian Army and the Indian Air Force.

== History ==
=== First series (2008–2013) ===
The First series of Gurkha variants were fitted with a 2.6-litre, intercooled Mercedes-Benz OM616 diesel engine, which comes with a displacement capacity of 2,596cc.

=== Second series (2013–2017) ===
The second series of Gurkha variant was fitted with a 2.6-litre, intercooled diesel engine, which comes with a displacement capacity of 2,596cc. It was compliant with Bharat Stage III (BS3) emission standards and incorporated with a turbocharger. It enables the engine to producing a maximum of 81 hp (60 kW) at 3,200rpm in combination with a peak torque output of 230 N⋅m (170 lb⋅ft) between 1,800 and 2,000rpm. It is integrated with four cylinders and sixteen valves using a double overhead camshaft-based valve configuration. This power plant is integrated with a direct injection fuel supply system that helps in delivering 15 km/L (35 mpg_{‑US}; 6.7 L/100 km) approximately on the highways and about 10.5 km/L (25 mpg_{‑US}; 9.5 L/100 km) in the city traffic conditions. This diesel motor is skillfully coupled with a five-speed manual transmission gearbox, which helps it in attaining a top speed in the range of 130–140 km/h (81–87 mph). At the same time, it can accelerate to 100 km/h (62 mph) in about 17 seconds from a standstill.

=== Third series (2017–2021) ===
The third series of Gurkha is available in three different variants Xplorer (3 door & 5 door), Xpedition (5 door) and the Xtreme (3 door). Comes with a new BS-IV compliant engine in addition to a host of changes. The off-roader can be ordered in both soft-top and hardtop versions, while you get sturdy bits like a steel bumper with foglamps as well as a factory-fitted snorkel intake for better water-wading capabilities.

==== Gurkha Xplorer ====
The Gurkha Xplorer variant comes 3 door and 5 door.

==== Gurkha Xpedition ====
It shares many similarities with the Xplorer variants and comes in 5-door. The engine, emission standards, and maximum output remain the same as Xplorer.

In terms of axles, the Xpedition 5 door features a dead independent front axle and a live rigid rear axle which is a 2WD. This configuration may provide different handling characteristics compared to the live axles with differential locks found in the Xplorer variants.

==== Gurkha Xtreme (3 door) ====
Unlike the Xplorer and Xpedition versions, it has a 2.2-litre Mercedes-Benz OM611 4-cylinder diesel engine, delivering 140 horsepower (104 kW; 142 PS) and 321 N⋅m (237 lb⋅ft) of torque. The vehicle features a 5-speed manual transmission and a single-lever selective 4x4 system for better off-road performance.

It is built to handle tough terrains with front and rear differential locks, a multi-link suspension system, and live rigid axles. The vehicle has power steering, a turning radius of 5.65 meters, and a robust C in C Ladder Type chassis.

Safety features include dual-circuit hydraulic vacuum-assisted service brakes, ABS, disc brakes in the front, and drum brakes in the rear. The vehicle comes with 245/70 R16 tyres. With a seating capacity of 5 plus the driver, it has a fuel tank capacity of 63.5 liters for long-distance travel.

== Current gen ==
=== Fourth series (2021–present) ===
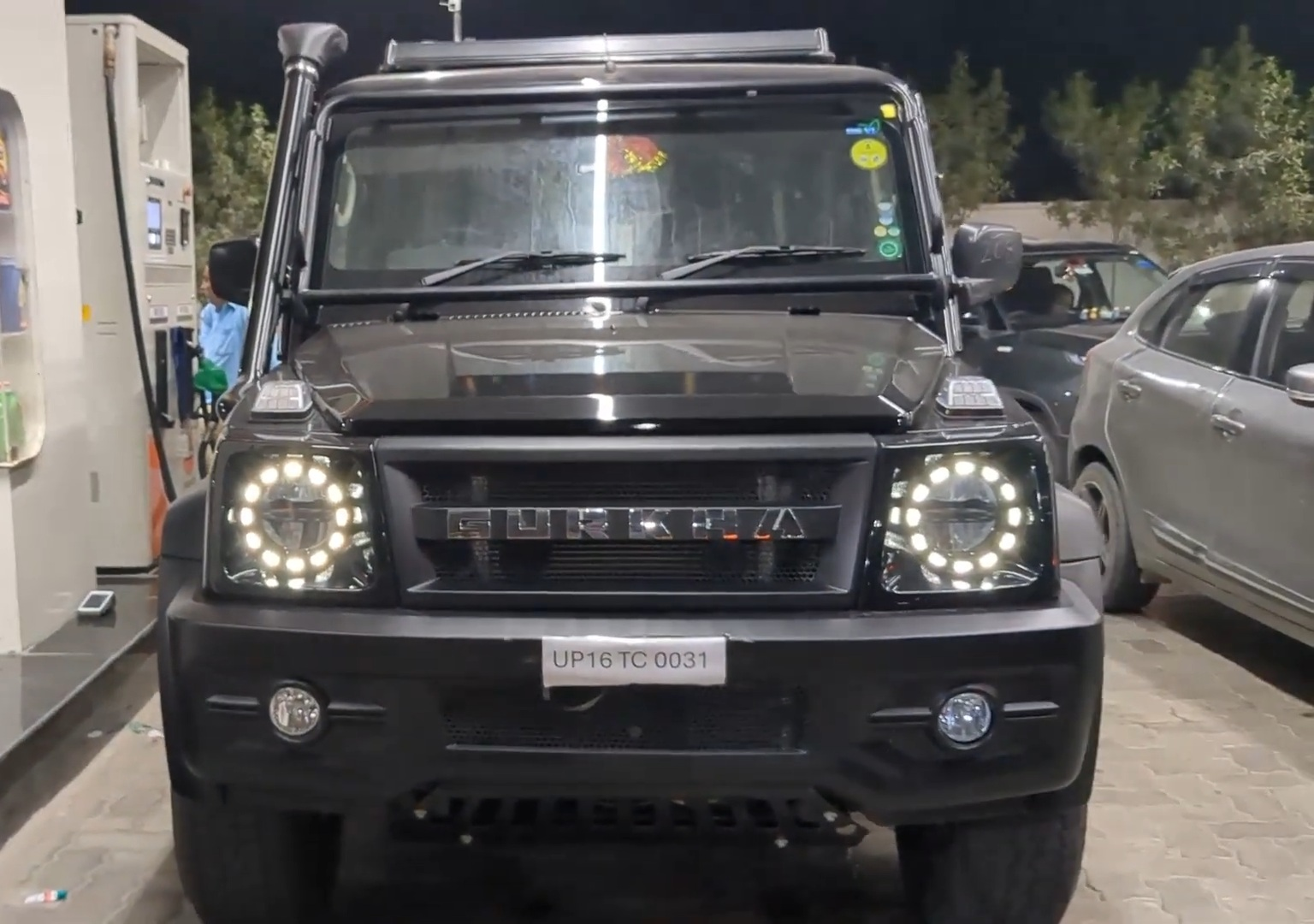
Fourth generation Force Gurkha

Force has launched the new-gen Gurkha and in October 2021. The Gurkha is equipped with an FM 2.6 CR CD BS VI engine with four cylinders and a displacement of 2,596 cc. It delivers a maximum power of 90 hp (67 kW) at 3,200 rpm and a maximum torque of 250 N⋅m (184 lb⋅ft) at 1,400–2,400 rpm.

The transmission is a G28/5 manual synchromesh gear box with five forward gears and one reverse gear. The front axle is a live independent system, while the rear axle is a live rigid setup. Manual differential locks are available for both axles.

The suspension system consists of an independent double wishbone with coil springs at the front and a multi-link setup with a Pan hard rod and coil springs at the rear. The Gurkha is equipped with front anti-roll bar and shock absorbers, as well as a rear anti-roll bar.

Braking is handled by a dual circuit hydraulic brake system with vacuum assistance. The front brakes are discs, while the rear brakes are drums. The vehicle also features ABS and EBD for enhanced safety.

The steering is hydraulically assisted power steering with tilt and telescopic adjustments. The turning circle radius is 5.65 m (18.5 ft). The Gurkha rides on steel wheels and tubeless tyres sized at 245/70 R16.

In terms of capabilities, the Gurkha features an air intake snorkel and has a water wading capacity of 700 mm (28 in). It has a gradeability of 35 degrees in 4X4 mode.

The Gurkha offers seating for three passengers plus a driver and has a fuel tank capacity of 63 liters (17 U.S. gal). The interior includes door trims with a dark grey theme, a floor console with bottle holders, moulded floor mats, and seat upholstery with a dark grey theme.

For infotainment, the Gurkha is equipped with a 17.78 cm (7 in) aftermarket touch screen, four speakers, USB, FM, and Bluetooth connectivity for music and calling. It also supports Android Auto and Apple CarPlay.

In terms of safety, the Gurkha comes with airbags for the driver and front passenger, follow me home and lead me to Gurkha lighting, rear parking sensors, one-touch lane change indicators, cornering lamps, speed-sensing auto door locks, and a tyre pressure monitoring system. It also features front fog lamps and full LED headlamps with daytime running lights.

For comfort and convenience, the Gurkha offers captain seats with armrests for second-row passengers, a total cabin space of 3,900 litres (140 cu ft), and a luggage space of 500 litres (18 cu ft). It also has multi-directional AC vents, power windows, central locking, a 12V accessories socket in the dashboard, dual USB sockets on the dashboard, and dual USB sockets for second-row passengers. Entry for second-row passengers is from the rear.

In terms of dimensions, the Gurkha has a wheelbase of 2400 mm, an overall length of 4116 mm, an overall width of 1812 mm, an overall height of 2075 mm, and front and rear track widths of 1490 mm and 1480 mm, respectively.
