= Mercedes-Benz OM602 engine =

Mercedes-Benz OM602 Diesel Engine

Overview
- Manufacturer: Daimler-Benz
- Production: 1985–2002

Layout
- Configuration: Straight-5
- Displacement: 2.5 L (2,497 cc); 2.9 L (2,874 cc)
- Cylinder block material: Cast iron
- Cylinder head material: Aluminum
- Valvetrain: SOHC / 2 valves x cyl.

RPM range
- Max. engine speed: 1985-1993 4700 rpm 1994-2002 4000 rpm

Combustion
- Turbocharger: TDI version
- Fuel system: Indirect injection Direct injection
- Management: Bosch PES in-line or VE-style rotary distributor injection pumps
- Fuel type: Diesel
- Oil system: Wet sump
- Cooling system: Water-cooled

Output
- Power output: 66–95 kW (90–129 PS; 89–127 hp)

Chronology
- Successor: OM605

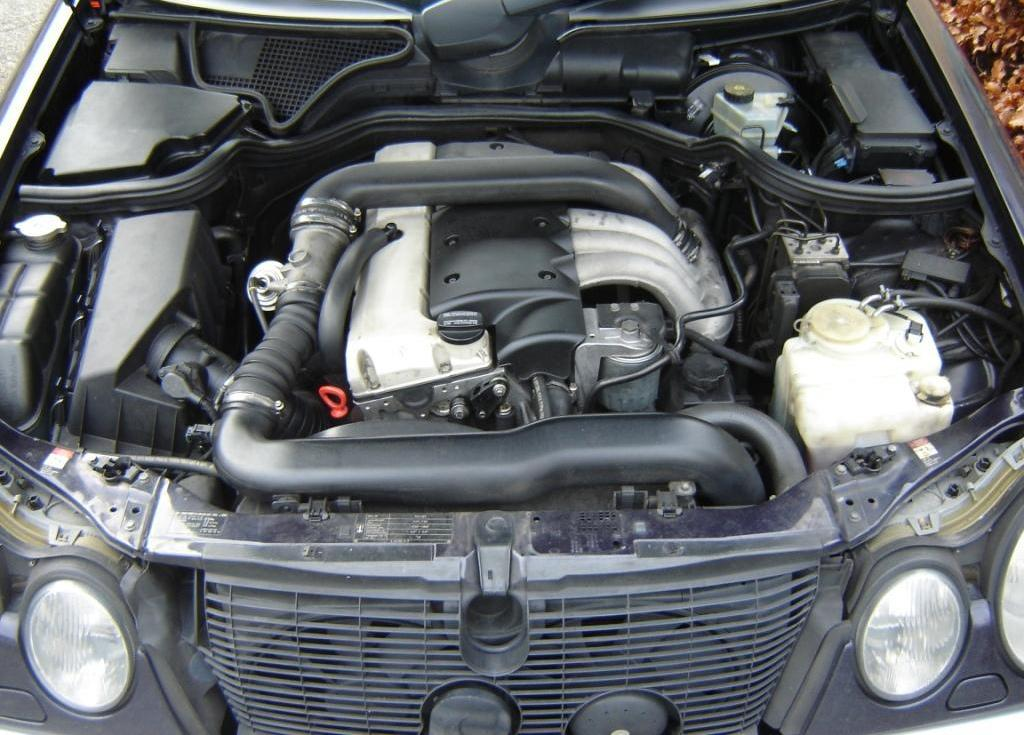
Mercedes-Benz OM 602.982 engine in the E 290 Turbodiesel (W 210)

The successor of the OM617 engine family was the newly developed straight-5 diesel automobile engine OM602 from Mercedes-Benz used from 1980s up to 2002. With some OM602 Powered Mercedes-Benz vehicles exceeding 500,000 or 1,000,000 miles (800,000 or 1,610,000 km), it is considered to be one of the most reliable engines ever produced, a success which is only comparable with the famous OM617 engine.

It is closely related to the 4 cylinder OM601 and the 6 cylinder OM603 engine families of the same era.

The 5-cylinder OM602 was succeeded by the four-valve OM605 engine and later the OM612 and OM647 engines with turbocharger and common rail direct injection.

== The engine ==
The Mercedes OM602 engine is a 5-cylinder diesel engine of 2.5 or 2.9 L (2,497 or 2,874 cc). The 2.9 L (2,874 cc) was used in the 310D and 410D Mercedes-Benz T1 and the Phase 1 Mercedes-Benz Sprinter vans (where it was modified for direct injection), the Ssangyong Musso, Korando and Rexton range and even in the 1996–1999 models of the E-class. It was available in either naturally aspirated or turbocharged variants with two valves per cylinder.

The camshafts and injection pump are driven by duplex chain from the crankshaft. A separate single-row chain drives the oil pump. The camshaft operated the valves via hydraulic bucket tappets; valve clearance adjustment is automatic. The water pump is driven via the single serpentine belt, which also drives all other accessories.

On many OM602 engines fuel injection is indirect. A Bosch PES in-line injection pump is used, with a mechanical governor and vacuum-operated stop control. The pump is lubricated by a connection to the engine oil circulation and the fuel lift pump is mounted on the side of the injection pump.

Some later versions of the 2.9 L (2,874 cc) capacity unit use a Bosch VE-style rotary distributor injection pump with electronic control and have a significantly different combustion chamber as they use direct injection.

Preheating is by glow plugs with automatic control of preheating time.

== Versions of OM602 Mercedes 5-cylinder diesel engine ==
Model indication	Year	Engine no OM602...	Power
OM 602.xxx (5-cylinder diesel)
W201 190 2.5 D & W124 250 D	04/1985 - 06/1993	.911 & .912 & .930 & .931	66 kW (90 PS; 89 hp) (<'89) or 69 kW (94 PS; 93 hp) (>'89)
G-Class 250 GD 4x4	04/1985 - 06/1993	.938 & .939	66 kW (90 PS; 89 hp) (<'89) or 69 kW (94 PS; 93 hp) (>'89)
MB100 & SsangYong Istana & Daewoo Istana	1996 - > 2004	662.941	70 kW (95 PS; 94 hp)
SsangYong Korando (KJ) 2.9 D	01/1997-> 01/2007	662.941	70 kW (95 PS; 94 hp)
T1 210 & 310 & 410 2.9 D.	10/1988 -> 1995	.940 & .942	72 kW (98 PS; 97 hp) or 75 kW (102 PS; 101 hp)
G-Class 290 GD 4x4	10/1988 -> 1995	.946 & .947	72 kW (98 PS; 97 hp) or 75 kW (102 PS; 101 hp)
W201 190D 2.5 Turbo & W124 250D Turbo / 300D 2.5 Turbo	01/1987 -> 1996	A.961 & A.962	90 kW (122 PS; 121 hp) (<'88) or 92 kW (125 PS; 123 hp) (>'88)
210D & 310D & 410D & Sprinter 2.9 TD	02/1995 -> 04/2000	A.963	75 kW (102 PS; 101 hp)
212D & 312D & 412D & Sprinter 2.9 TD	02/1995 -> 04/2000	A.980 & A.986	90 kW (122 PS; 121 hp)
512D & 612D & 812D & Vario 2.9 TD	07/1996 -> 09/2001	A.980 & A.986	90 kW (122 PS; 121 hp)
G-Class 290 GD turbodiesel 4x4	07/1997 -> 09/2000	A.983	88 kW (120 PS; 118 hp)
W210 E290 turbodiesel	03/1996 -> 07/1999	A.982	95 kW (129 PS; 127 hp)
SsangYong Korando (KJ) 2.9 TD	01/1997 -> 01/2007	662.910	88 kW (120 PS; 118 hp)
Ssangyong Musso (FJ) & SsangYong Musso Sports (P100) 2.9 TD	08/1993 -> 06/2005	662.910	88 kW (120 PS; 118 hp)
SsangYong Rexton I (Y200) 290	09/2001 -> 02/2006	662.910	88 kW (120 PS; 118 hp)
Mercedes UNIMOG	1978 -> 1989	A. 981 & A.982	95 kW (129 PS; 127 hp)
