= Tempo Records =

Australian Tempo Record (manufactured by Australian Record Co.Pty.Ltd.Sydney N.S.W.)

Tempo Records may refer to:

- Tempo Records (US), a United States–based company
- Tempo Records (UK), a United Kingdom–based company

== See also ==
- List of record labels
- Tempo (disambiguation)
