= Mercedes-Benz OM601 engine =

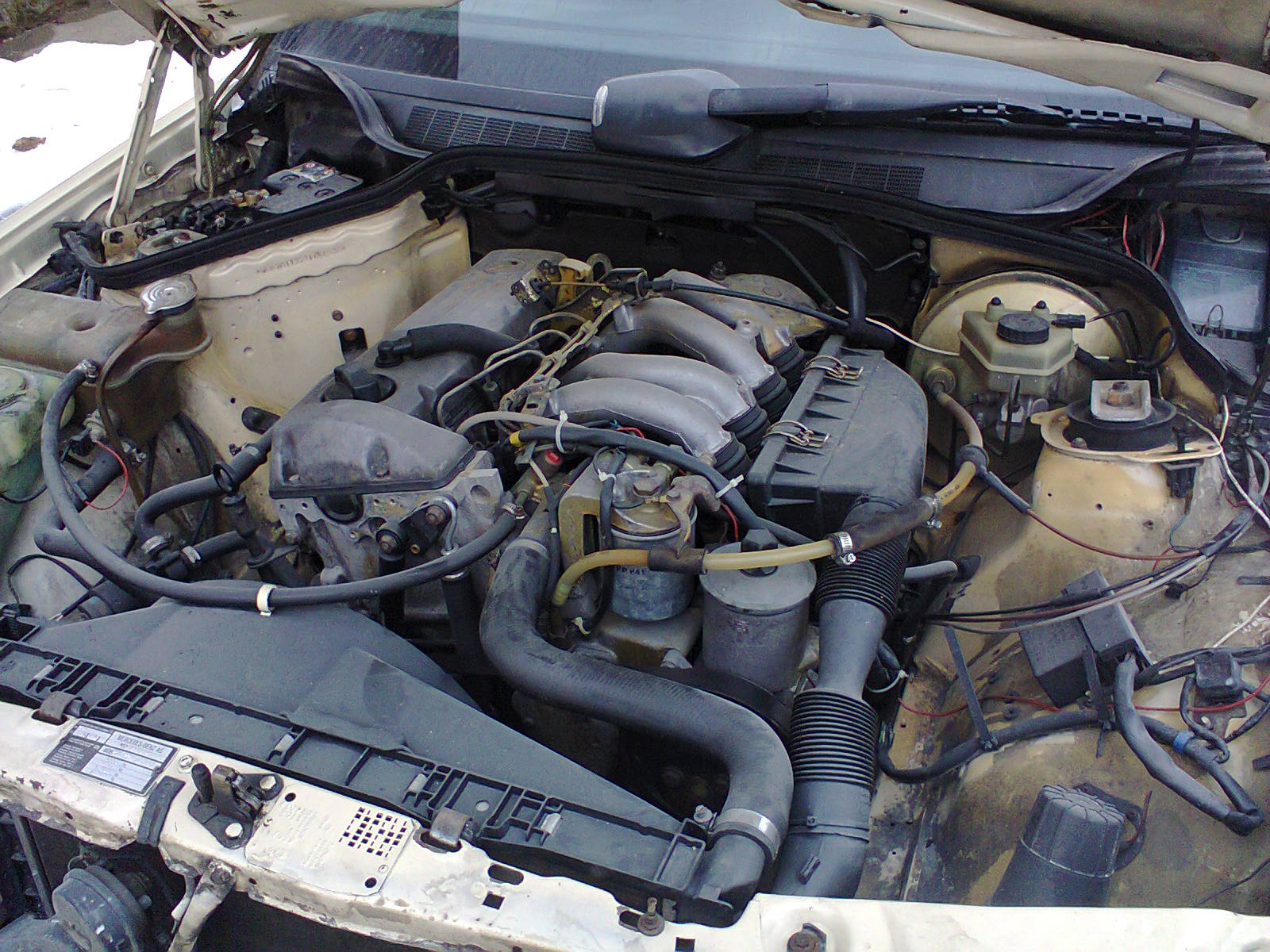
- OM601 engine

Overview
- Manufacturer: Mercedes-Benz
- Production: 1983–2000

Layout
- Configuration: Inline-4
- Displacement: 2.0 L (1,997 cc); 2.2 L (2,197 cc); 2.3 L (2,299 cc)
- Cylinder bore: 87 mm (3.43 in); 89 mm (3.50 in)
- Piston stroke: 84 mm (3.31 in); 92.4 mm (3.64 in)
- Cylinder block material: Cast iron
- Cylinder head material: Aluminum
- Valvetrain: SOHC, 2 valves per cylinder
- Compression ratio: 22.0:1

Combustion
- Turbocharger: Yes (.97x only)
- Fuel system: Indirect injection
- Fuel type: Diesel
- Oil system: Wet sump
- Cooling system: Water-cooled

Output
- Power output: 72–96 bhp (54–72 kW)
- Torque output: 93–170 lb⋅ft (126–230 N⋅m)

Chronology
- Predecessor: Mercedes-Benz OM616
- Successor: Mercedes-Benz OM604 engine

The Mercedes-Benz OM601 engine is an inline-four diesel engine that was manufactured by Mercedes-Benz from 1983 to 2000. It is the successor to the OM616 engine and was succeeded by the OM604 engine in 1993.

== Design ==
The OM601 is closely related in design to the 5 cylinder OM602 and the 6 cylinder OM603 engine families of the same era.

The OM601 uses an iron block with an aluminum head. The camshaft and fuel injection pump are driven by a duplex chain from the crankshaft; a separate single-row chain drives the oil pump from the crankshaft.

Fuel is delivered via indirect injection through the pre-chamber. The mechanical injection pump features a 5,150 RPM (± 50 RPM) mechanical governor, automatic altitude compensation, and load-sensing automatic idle speed control; the injection pump is lubricated by a connection to the engine oil circulation system.

The use of the block heater to aid in cold starting was recommended in climates where the temperature drops to below 10 °F (−12 °C) during the year.

== Variants and Applications ==
Seven variants in three displacements were offered:

Variant Code	Application	Displacement	Power	Torque	Notes
601.911	W201 190 D (European market)	2.0 L (1,997 cc) 122 in^{3}	72 bhp (54 kW) at 4,200 RPM	96 lb⋅ft (130 N⋅m) at 2,800 RPM	Naturally aspirated, European market consumer vehicle applications
601.912	W124 200 D (European market)	2.0 L (1,997 cc) 122 in^{3}	72 bhp (54 kW) at 4,200 RPM	96 lb⋅ft (130 N⋅m) at 2,800 RPM	Naturally aspirated, European market consumer vehicle applications
601.913	W202 C200 D (European market)	2.0 L (1,997 cc) 122 in^{3}	75 bhp (55 kW) at 4,600 RPM	96 lb⋅ft (130 N⋅m) at 2,000 RPM	Naturally aspirated, European market consumer vehicle applications
601.921	W201 190 D (North American market)	2.2 L (2,197 cc) 134 in^{3}	72 bhp (54 kW) at 4,200 RPM	96 lb⋅ft (130 N⋅m) at 2,800 RPM	Naturally aspirated, designed to meet North American emissions standards
601.940	T1 208 D, 308 D, and 408D	2.3 L (2,299 cc) 140 in^{3}	78 bhp (58 kW) at 3,800 RPM	152 lb⋅ft (206 N⋅m) at 2,000-2,800 RPM	Naturally aspirated, commercial vehicle applications
601.942	Vito 108 D	2.3 L (2,299 cc) 140 in^{3}	78 bhp (58 kW) at 3,800 RPM	152 lb⋅ft (206 N⋅m) at 2,000-2,800 RPM	Naturally aspirated, commercial vehicle applications
601.943	Sprinter	2.3 L (2,299 cc) 140 in^{3}	78 bhp (58 kW) at 3,800 RPM	152 lb⋅ft (206 N⋅m) at 2,000-2,800 RPM	Naturally aspirated, commercial vehicle applications
601.970	V 230 TD Vito 110 D	2.3 L (2,299 cc) 140 in^{3}	96 bhp (72 kW) at 3,800 RPM	230 lb⋅ft (312 N⋅m) at 1,700-2,400 RPM	Turbocharged, commercial vehicle applications

== Gallery ==
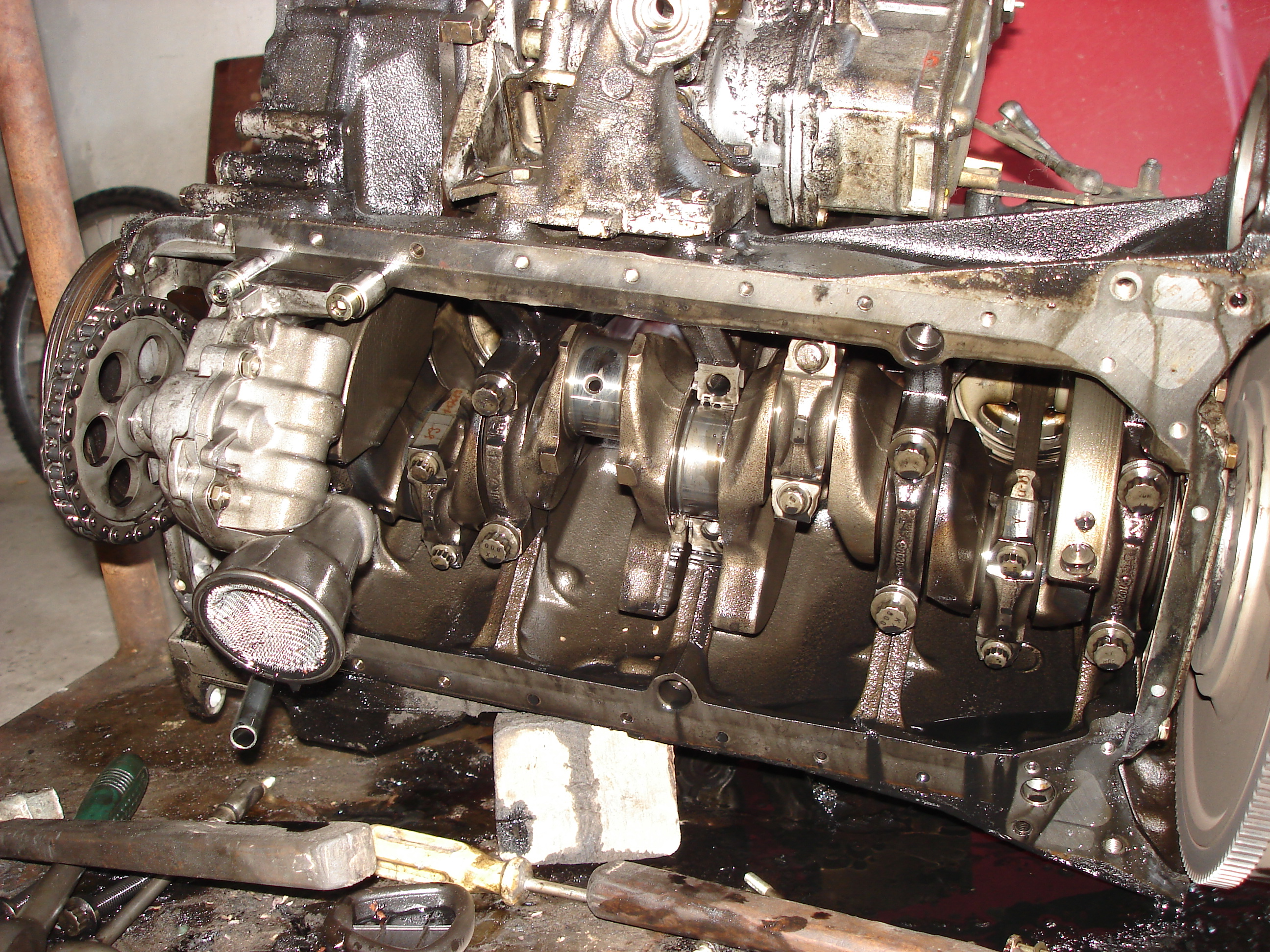
An OM601 engine with a removed oil-pan. Overview of the crankshaft and piston rods.

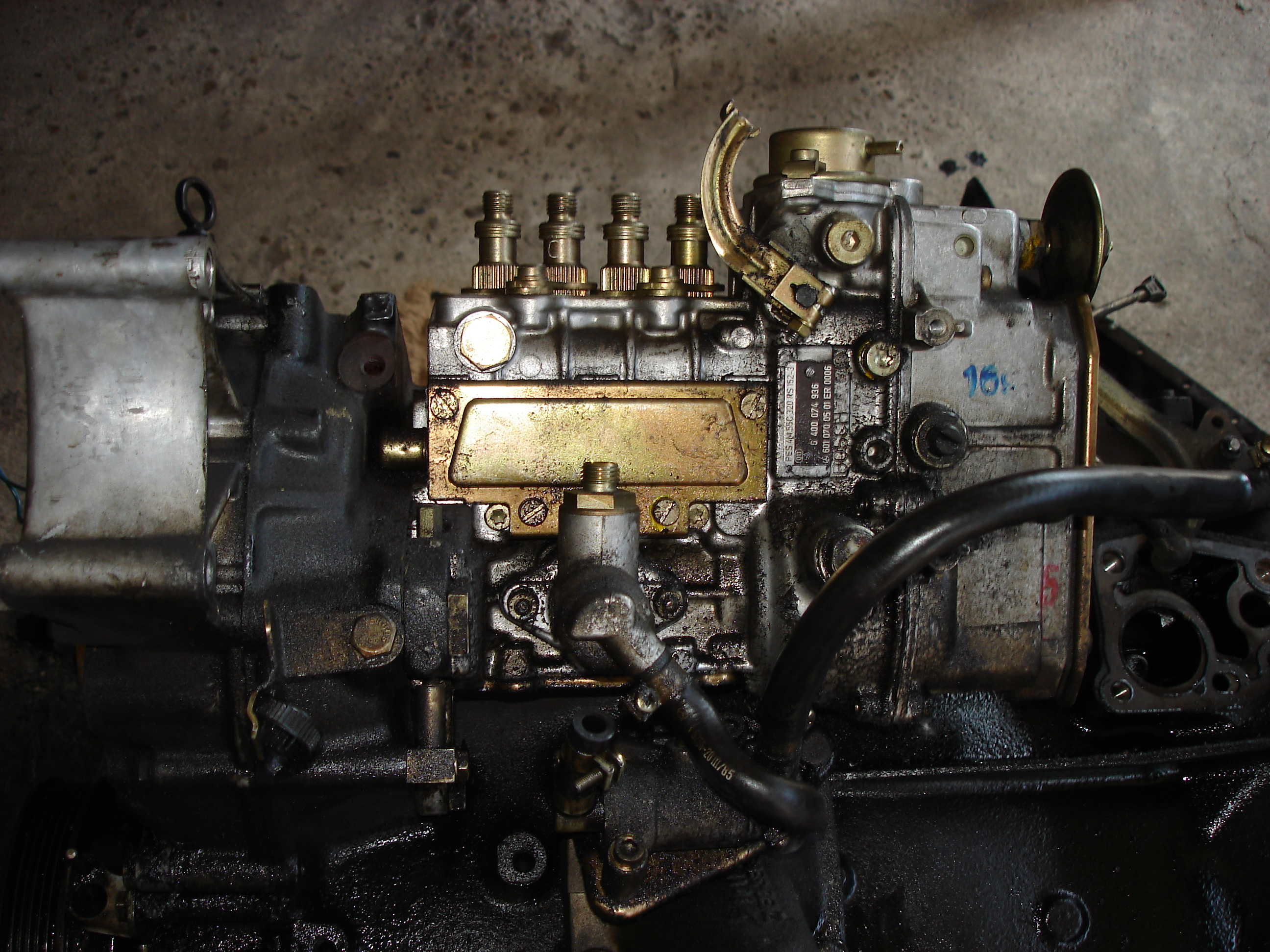
A side-view of Mercedes-Benz OM601 engine diesel fuel injection pump.

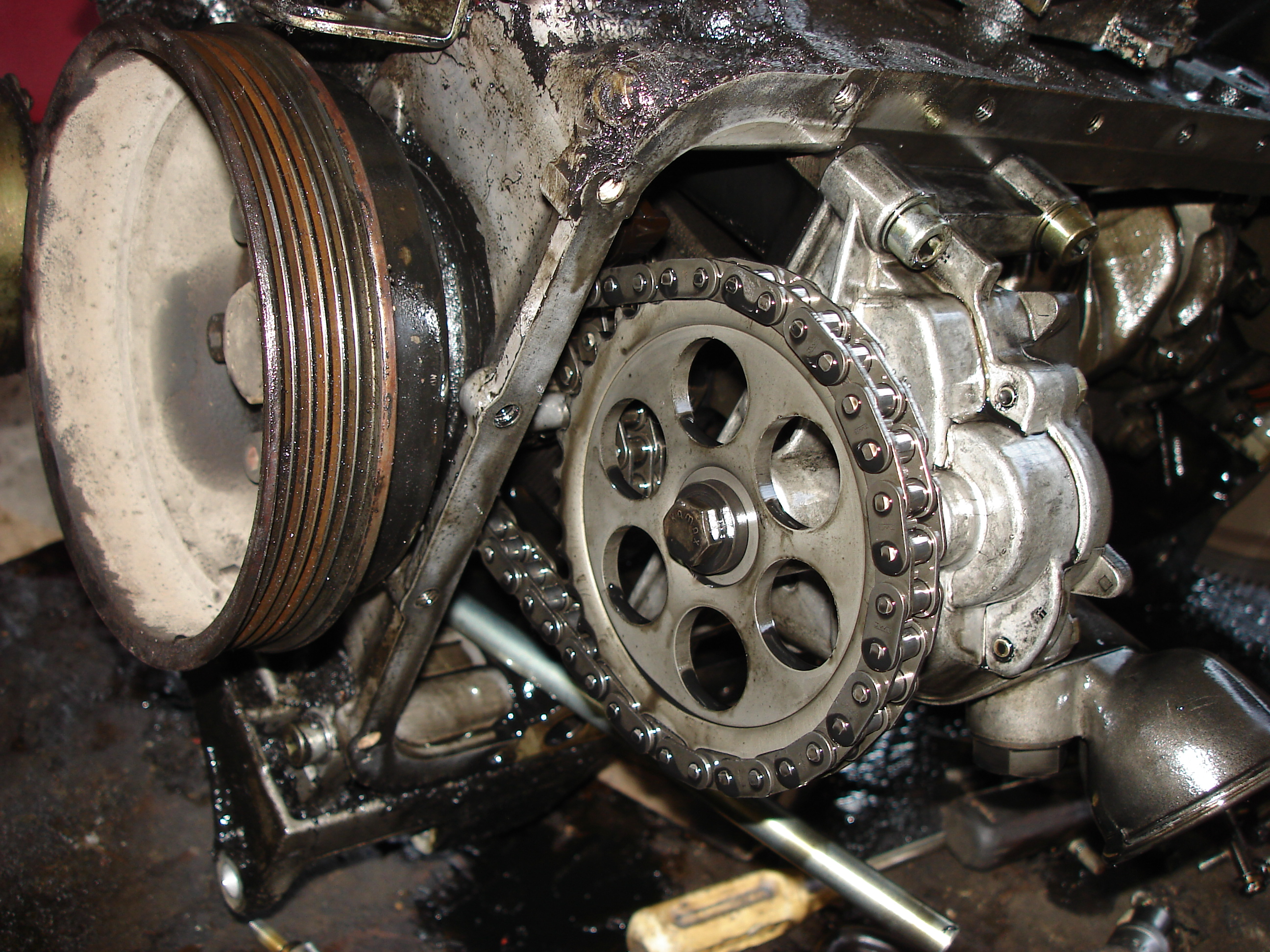
A close view of OM601's oil pump. On the left side the crankshaft belt drive washer is visible.

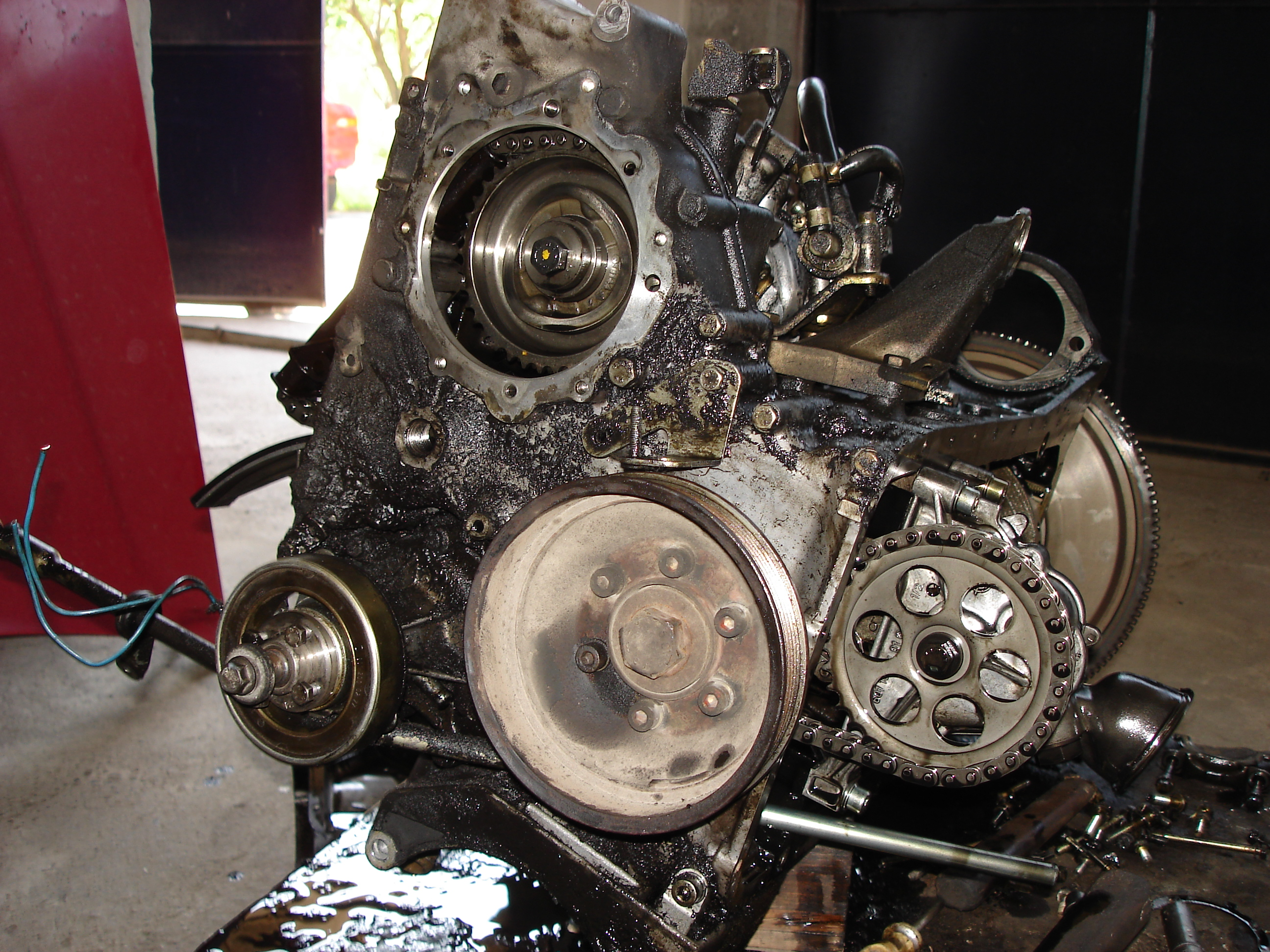
Front-side view of a disassembled OM601 diesel engine.

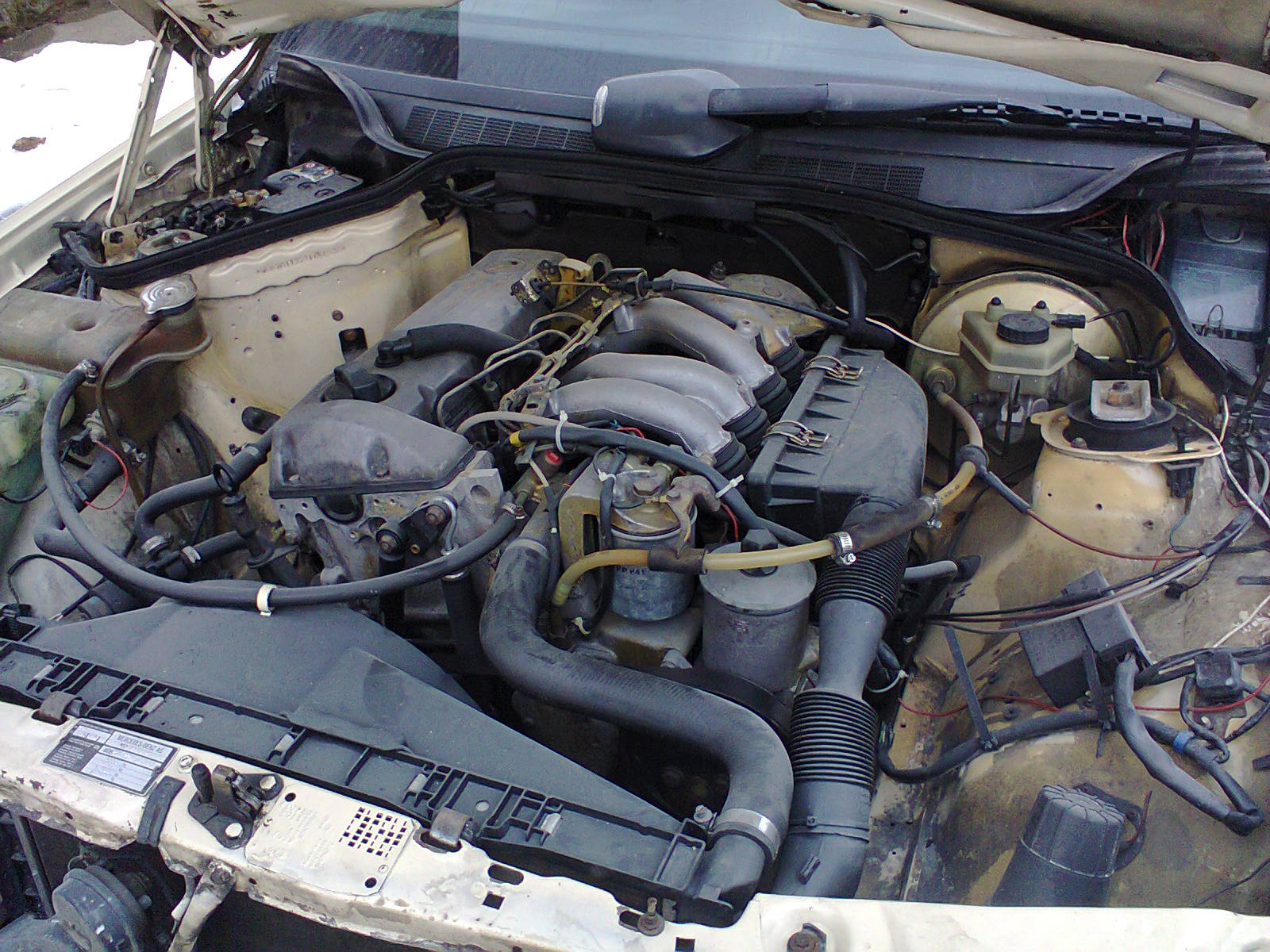
A Mercedes-Benz OM601 naturally aspirated diesel engine fitted in a W201 190D Mercedes-Benz passenger car.
