= Mercedes-Benz TN =

Mercedes-Benz TN/T1
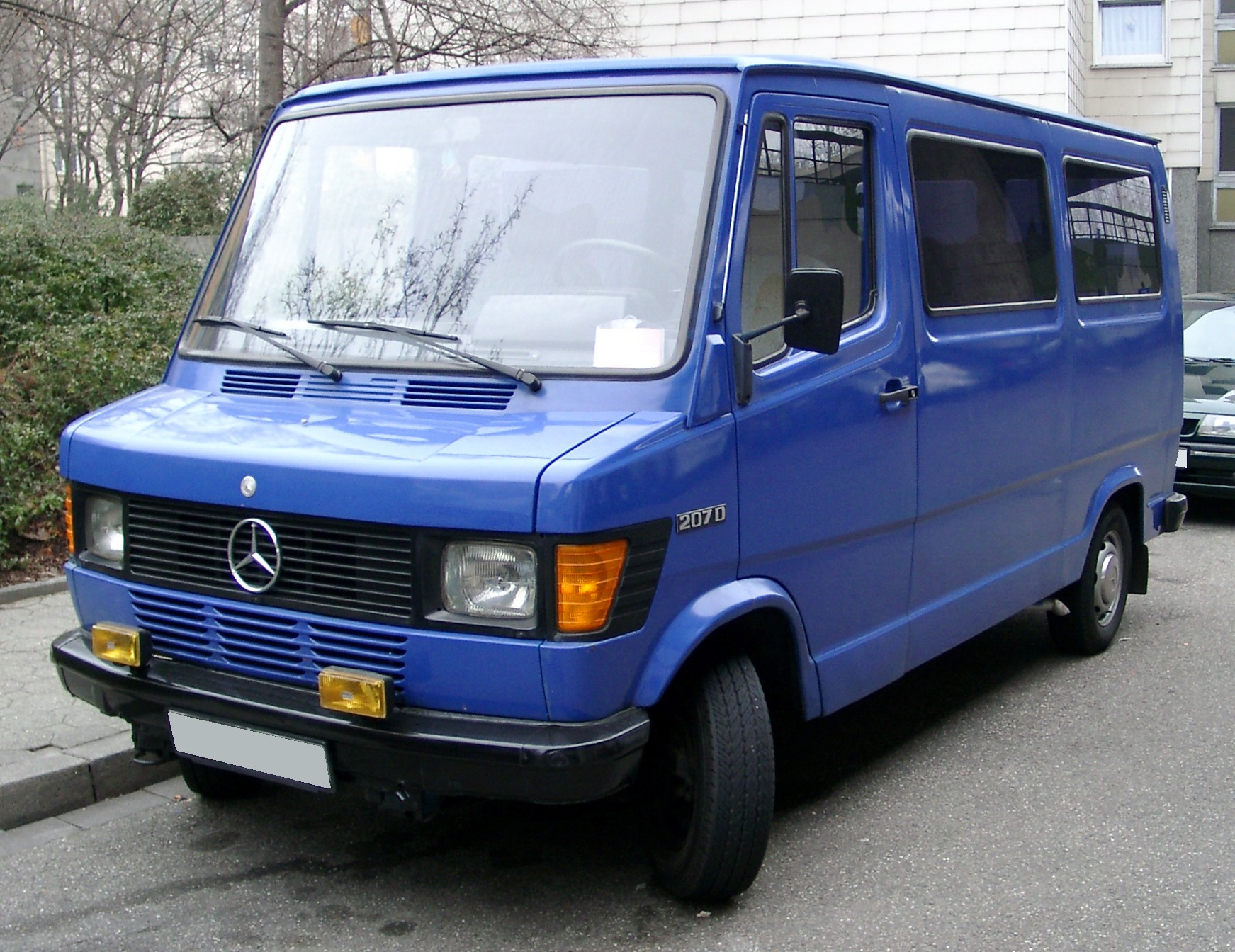

Overview
- Manufacturer: Daimler-Benz
- Also called: Mercedes-Benz T1; Bremen Transporter; Togo Atlas; Mercedes-Benz Vario 3100
- Production: 1977–1995
- Assembly: Germany: Bremen (1977–1984); Germany: Düsseldorf (1983–1995)
- Designer: Stefan Heiliger

Body and chassis
- Class: Van (M); Small truck
- Related: Force Traveller (India)

Chronology
- Predecessor: Harburger Transporter
- Successor: Mercedes-Benz Sprinter

In 1977 Daimler-Benz introduced a new van/truck (a.k.a. transporter), called Mercedes-Benz T1 internally. Other designations were series TN ("Transporter Neu") and Bremer Transporter, since the vehicle was built in the Transporter-Plant in Bremen, Germany, first. In the years 1983/1984 production went - piece by piece - to the Transporter-Plant-Düsseldorf (city in the Rhineland, Germany). The internal chassis-designations (Baumuster, "BM") are: 601 (2.55–2.8t GVWR), 602 (3.2–3.5t GVWR) and 611 (4.6t GVWR).

== Design ==
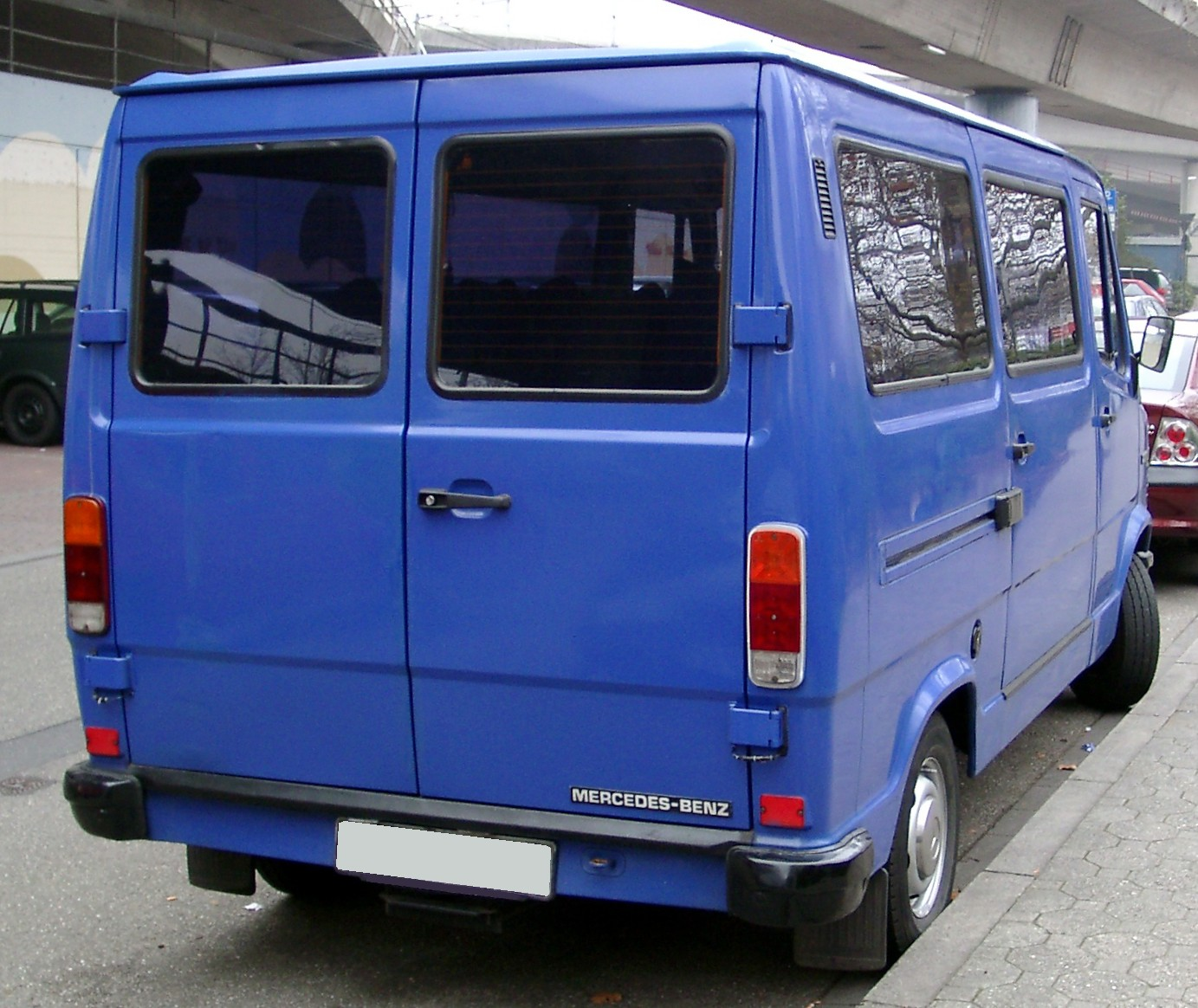
Rear view

The TN/T1 was available as a minibus or fitted with a cargo box body or flat cargo bed. A double cab version was offered in the latter two configurations. Three wheelbases were available, with gross weight ratings ranging from 2.55 to 4.6 tonnes. Mercedes-Benz-built gasoline or diesel engines were available as powerplant options for the rear-wheel drive chassis. The best known 4x4 Versions of the Mercedes-Benz TN/T1 were made by Iglhaut by adapting parts of the G-Wagen to the TN/T1-chassis. The TN/T1 van was also used as the basis of campervan conversions, being much larger than the Volkswagen Transporter. In 1995, after 18 years of production, the TN/T1 van series was discontinued, succeeded by the T1N "Sprinter".

In the Philippines a rebadged version of the Mercedes-Benz T1 called Togo Atlas is locally made by Morales Motors. The Atlas is also offered as minibus or chassis cab for jeepneys and utility trucks.

== History ==
The TN/T1 van model series included 207 D, 208, 307 D and 308. They debuted in April 1977. The original line was composed of two engines and four weight classes:

- Weight Classes
  - 207 D, 208 - gross weight 2,550 kg (5,622 lb) or 2,800 kg (6,173 lb)
  - 307 D, 308 - gross weight 3,200 kg (7,055 lb) or 3,500 kg (7,716 lb)
- Engines
  - 207 D, 307 D - OM616 2404cc four-cylinder Diesel, rated 65 PS (48 kW); similar to engine fitted to W123-series 240D and W460-series 240GD models.
  - 208, 308 - M115 2307cc four-cylinder petrol, rated 85 PS (63 kW); similar to engine fitted to W123-series 230 "Low-Compression Export Version" models.

Market share was almost 90% for the Diesel engine and a little more than 10% for the petrol engine. While the petrol engine was mainly used for ambulances, firetrucks, special vans for cold areas, commercial buyers preferred the Diesel engine for its lower fuel consumption and best reliability. In the UK, originally only diesel engines were on offer, but as the British market was 80 percent petrol at the time sales were poor. For 1982 petrol models were added, and sales immediately increased by 80 percent. The body styles were panel van, different versions of window vans, pickup and pickup with double cab. Already the power outputs for the 4-cylinder engines were very good, so the 307 D was one of the fastest 3.5 ton (GVWR) Diesel-Vans in Europe of the late 1970s. Low gearing also meant that the vans were capable pullers, able to make best use of the power available whilst returning surprisingly good fuel economy for the large size and weight of vehicle.

In September 1981 the 407 D, 409 D and 410 were added with a gross weight of 4,600 kg (10,141 lb). The 409 D had a bigger and more powerful diesel engine with five cylinders, 2998 cc and 88 PS (65 kW). It was the OM 617 engine which was also used in the Mercedes-Benz 300 D passenger car and 300 GD G-Wagon. Other revisions throughout the production were minor, the OM 616 engine having a modified cylinder head and less bore which lowered the capacity from 2404 cc to 2399 cc, but producing slightly more power (72 bhp) and using 5-speed-gearboxes instead of the early 4-speed-versions.

In autumn 1988, two new diesel engines - called OM 601/23 and OM 602/29 - were offered, awarded the "Diesel 1989" award.

After 18 years of production, 970,000 of the Bremer Transporter were produced. In 1995 the Mercedes-Benz T1N Sprinter was launched, replacing the T1.

== Models ==
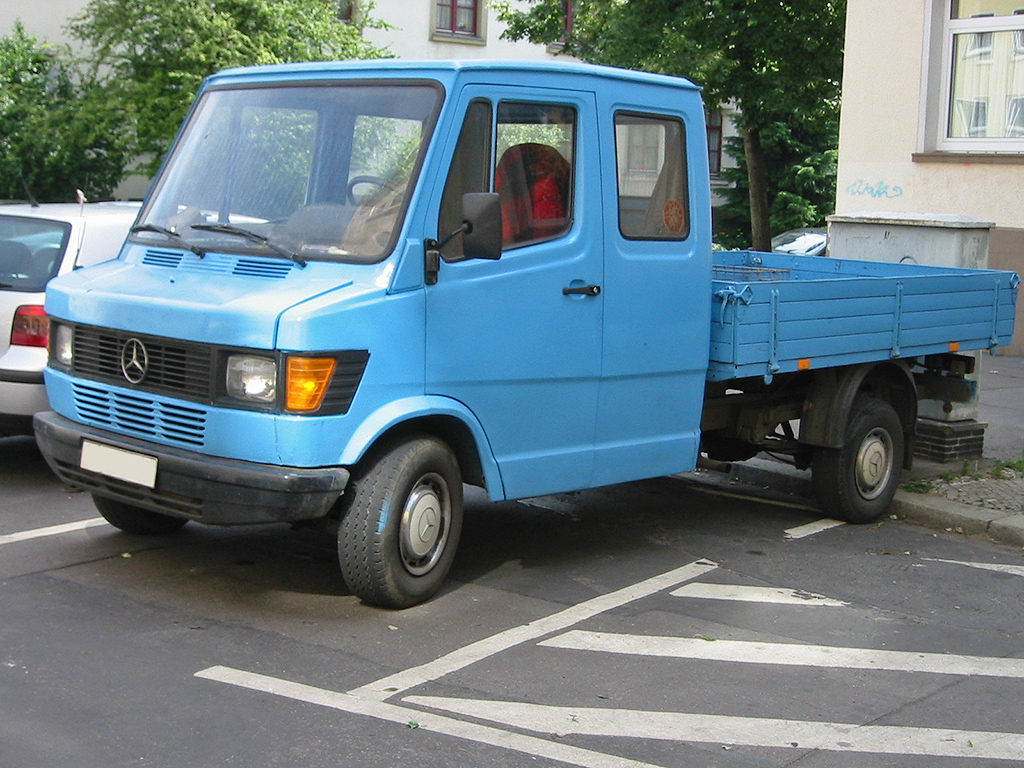
Mercedes-Benz T1 pickup

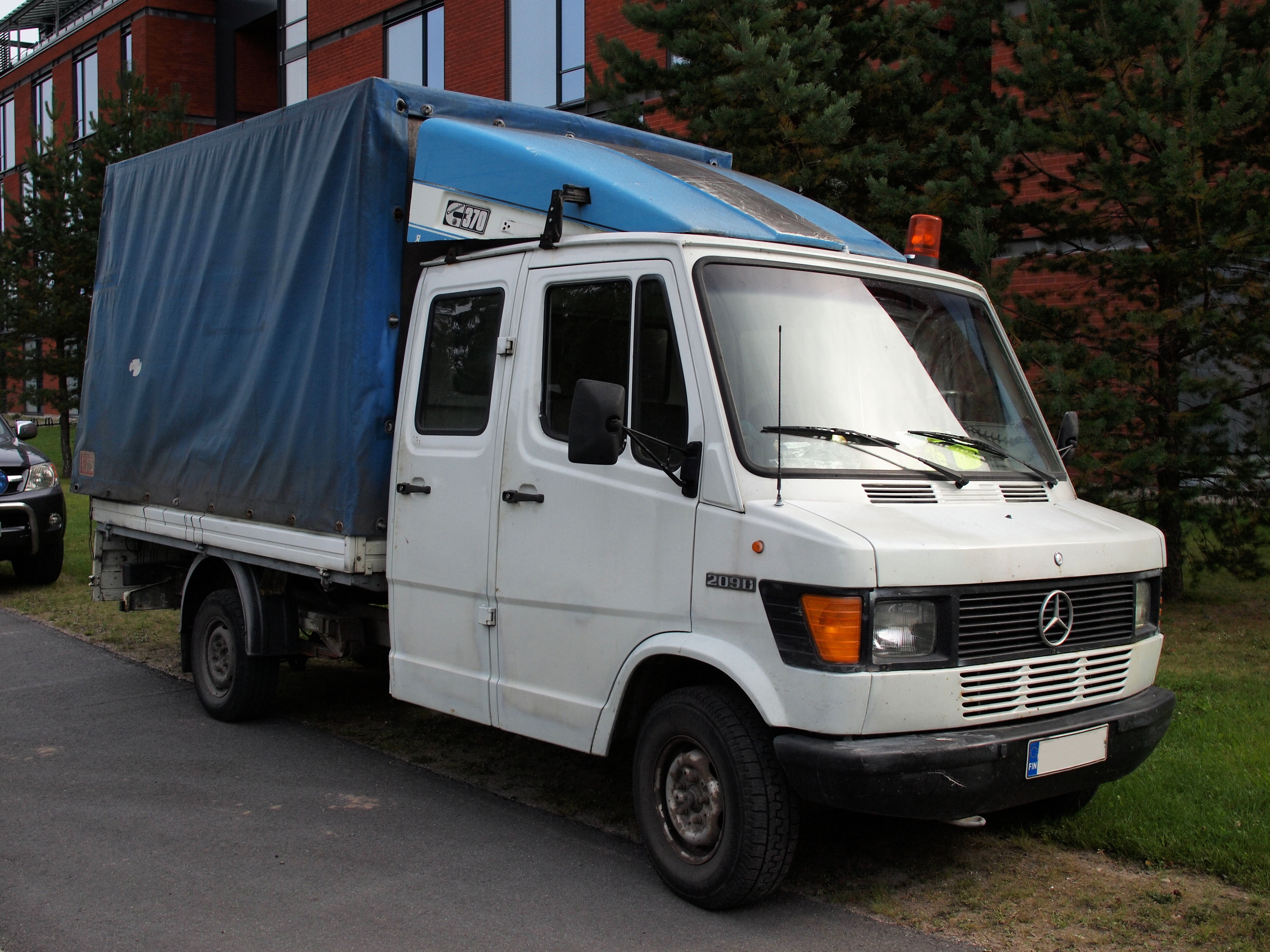
209 D Doppelkabine (Crew cab)

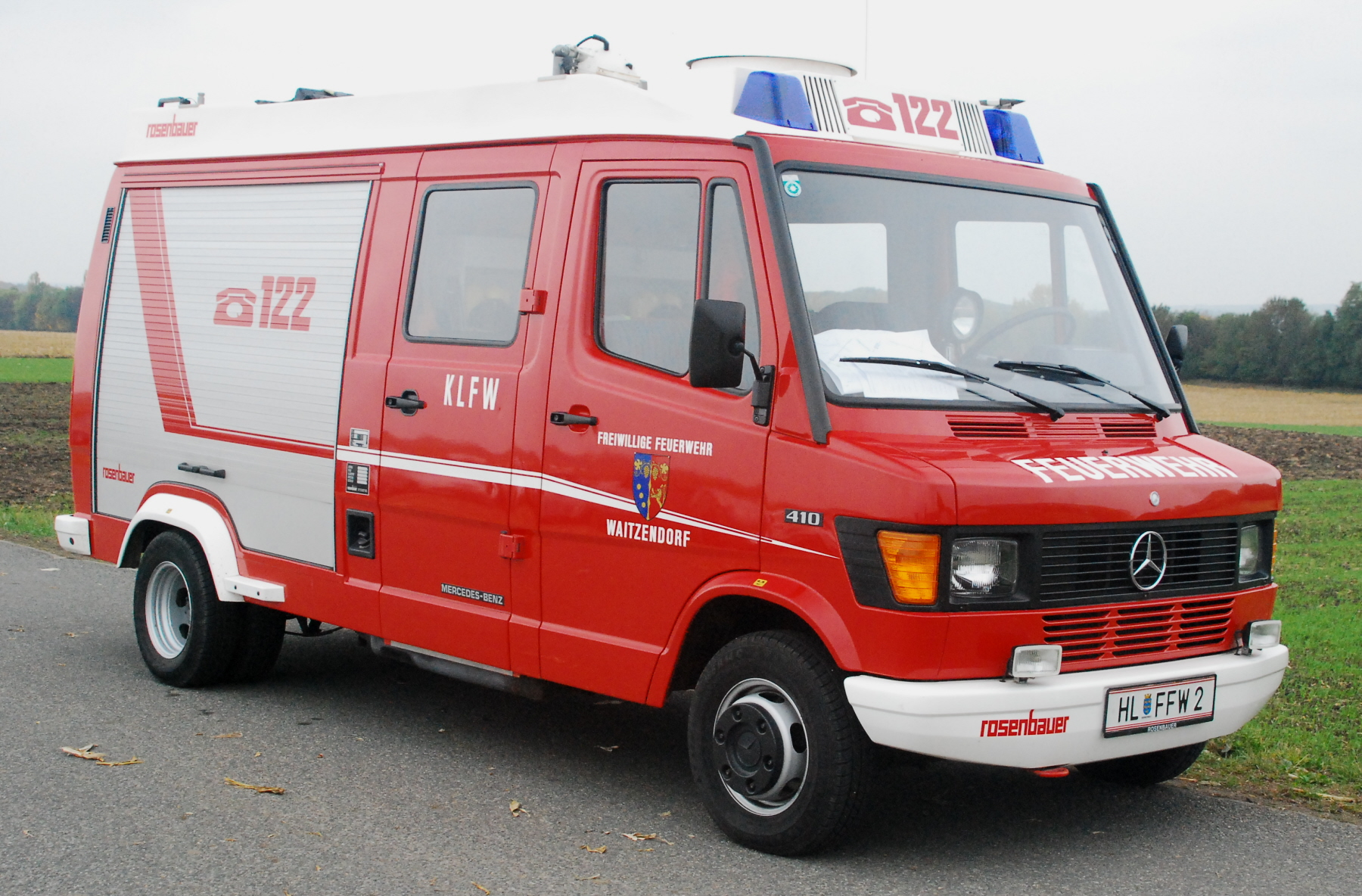
Mercedes-Benz T1 410 fire engine

TN / T1 Diesel (1977–1995)

| Model | Engine | Cylinders | Displacement | Max. power / rpm | Max. torque / rpm | Years |
|---|---|---|---|---|---|---|
| 207 D / 307 D / 407 D | OM616 (616.917/913/934) | 4 | 2404 cc | 65 PS (48 kW) / 4200 | 137 NM / 2400 | 1977–1982 |
| 207 D / 307 D | OM615 (615.944) | 4 | 1988 cc | 55 PS (40 kW) / 4200 | 113 NM / 2400 | 08.1977 – 10.1985*** |
| 207 D / 307 D / 407 D | OM616 (616.937/939) | 4 | 2399 cc | 72 PS (53 kW) / 4400 | 137 Nm / 2400 | 1982–1988 |
| 208 D / 308 D / 408 D | OM601 (601.940) | 4 | 2299 cc | 79 PS (58 kW) / 3800 (82 PS [60 kW] / 4000)* | 157 Nm / 2000–2800 | 1989–1995 |
| 209 D / 309 D / 409 D | OM617 (617.913) | 5 | 2998 cc | 88 PS (65 kW) / 4400 | 160 Nm / 2400 | 1982–1988 |
| 209 D / 309 D / 409 D | OM602 (602.?) | 5 | 2497 cc | 90 PS (66 kW) / 4400** | 154 Nm / 2400** | 1989–1993 |
| 210 D / 310 D / 410 D | OM602 (602.940) | 5 | 2874 cc | 95 PS (70 kW) / 3800 (98 PS [72 kW] / 4000)* | 192 Nm / 2400–2600 | 1989–1995 |

* with automatic transmission only, ** for Belgium only, *** for Italy only

TN / T1 Petrol (1977–1995)

| Model | Engine | Cylinders | Displacement | Max. Power / rpm | Max.torque / rpm | Years |
|---|---|---|---|---|---|---|
| 208 / 308 | M115 (115.955/972) | 4 | 2307 cc | 85 PS (63 kW) / 4800 | 160 Nm / 2000 | 1977–1982 |
| 210 / 310 / 410 | M102 (102.942) | 4 | 2299 cc | 95 PS (70 kW) / 5200 | 170 Nm / 2500 | 1982–1988 |
| 210 / 310 / 410 | M102 (102.945) | 4 | 2299 cc | 105 PS (77 kW) / 5100 | 182 Nm / 2000–2700 | 1989–1995 |

TN / T1 Electro (1978–1980?)

| Model | Engine | Cylinders | Displacement | Max. Power / rpm | Max.torque / rpm | Years |
|---|---|---|---|---|---|---|
| 307 E | | E-Engine | 2 x 90 volt | | | 1978–1980? |

The internal chassis designations: 601 - 2.55–2.8 t (207 D / 208 / 208 D / 209 D / 210 / 210 D) 602 - 3.2–3.5 t (307 D / 308 / 308 D / 309 D / 310 / 310 D) 611 - 4.6 t (407 D / 408 D / 409 D / 410 / 410 D)

Engine type:

- 601.0/602.0/611.0 - gasoline engine
- 601.3/602.3/611.3 - diesel engine 4cyl OM616 or OM601
- 601.4/602.4/611.4 - diesel engine 5cyl OM617 or OM602

Body type:

- 6XX.X1 - high-bed
- 6XX.X2 - low-bed
- 6XX.X6 - van (delivery van, box-type)
- 6XX.X7 - bus (station wagon)

Wheelbase:

- 6XX.XX1/6XX.XX6 - 3050 mm
- 6XX.XX2/6XX.XX7 - 3350 mm
- 6XX.XX8 - 3700 mm

Example: 601.426 - 209 D / 210 D, low bed, wheelbase 3050 mm
