= A Tiempo =

A Tiempo is Spanish for "on time". It may refer to:

- A Tiempo (Gian Marco album), 2002 studio album by Gian Marco
- A Tiempo (Ha*Ash album), 2011 studio album by Ha*Ash

== See also ==
- A Tiempo de Rock, a 1983 album by the band Sombrero Verde
- Tiempo (disambiguation)
