= Force Traveller =

Motor vehicle

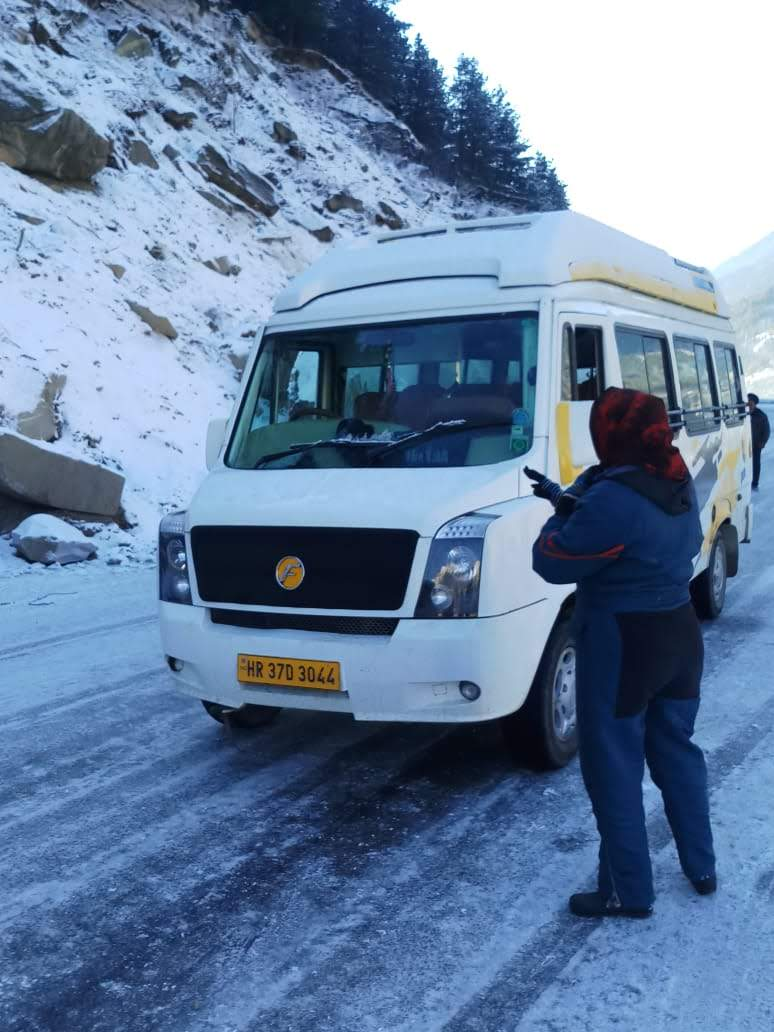

Overview
- Manufacturer: Force Motors
- Also called: Tempo Traveller (Old)
- Production: 1987–present

Body and chassis
- Class: Van (M); Small truck
- Related: Shaktiman 400; Mercedes-Benz TN; Mercedes-Benz Sprinter T1N; Volkswagen LT

Powertrain
- Engine: OM616 (early vans) FM 2.6 CR ED

Chronology
- Predecessor: Harburger Transporter

The Force Traveller is a light commercial vehicle (LCV) built on a Monocoque platform and available for passenger and cargo movement. The passenger version is available in a seating range of 9 to 25 Seats. It is made and distributed by Indian manufacturer Force Motors Limited.

The Product is available in various configurations in Non Air Condition (NAC) and Air Condition (AC) to accommodate seating options based on customer requirement.

It was originally launched in 1987 as the Tempo Traveller. The overall branding got updated to Force Traveller in the year 2005. A wider version of the Force Traveller was introduced in 2012.

== First generation ==
First Generation
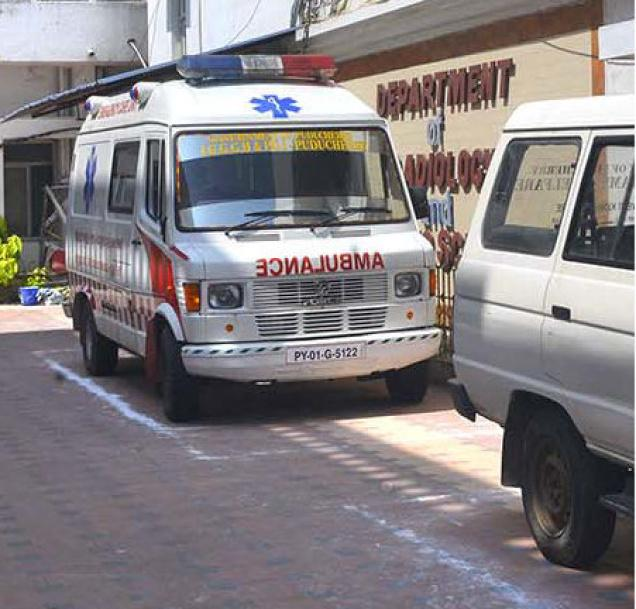

Overview
- Manufacturer: Force Motors
- Also called: Tempo Traveller (Old)
- Production: 1987-Present

Body and chassis
- Class: Bus M2, Delivery Van (N2),
- Related: Shaktiman 400; Mercedes-Benz TN

Powertrain
- Engine: OM616 (early vans) FM 2.6 CR ED

Chronology
- Predecessor: Harburg Transporter

=== Derivatives ===
There are different configurations for different uses including Luxury van, Minibus, School bus, Staff bus, Ambulance, Quick Response Vehicle, and a Delivery Van.

Other options include Passenger / Cargo, Regular width / Wider width, different Lengths based on Number of Seats with Non AC and AC.

The Force Traveller is very popular Model among the transport line in India, due to its versatile nature of seating. It comes in various configurations and is visible Pan India.

=== Specification ===
The Traveller is powered by a Mercedes-Benz derived 2.6-litre (2596 cc) FM 2.6 CR BS VI Phase 2 engine, with Diesel and CNG options. The diesel unit produces 85 kW (114 ps) @ 2950 rpm and torque of 350 Nm (257 lb⋅ft) @ 1400 - 2200 rpm..

Earlier Force models were powered by the Mercedes-Benz OM616 engine

== Second generation ==
Second Generation
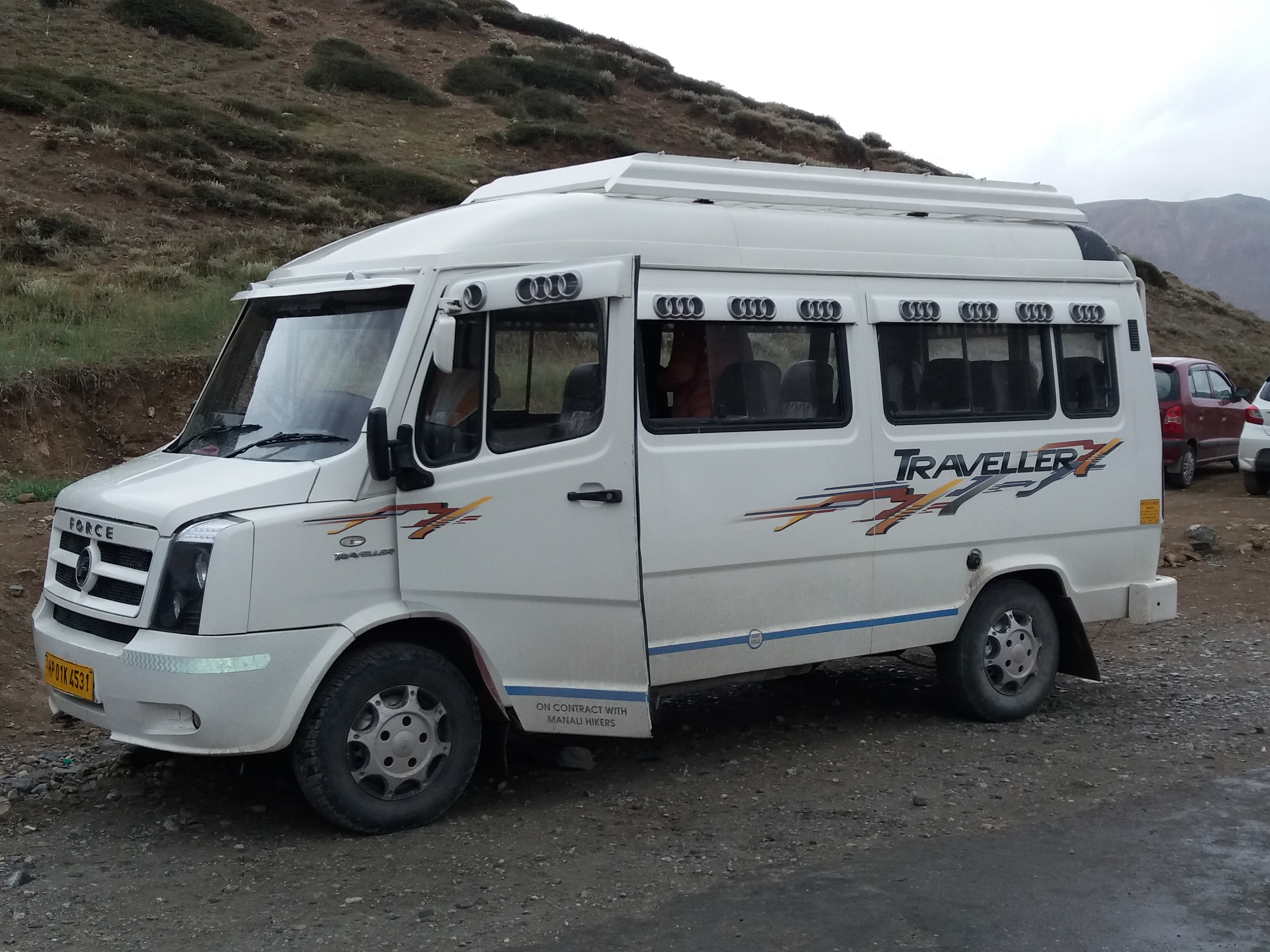

Overview
- Manufacturer: Force Motors
- Also called: Tempo Traveller
- Production: 2012-Present

Body and chassis
- Class: Bus (M2) Delivery Van (N2)
