= Tiempo (programme) =

Swedish climate change awareness program

Tiempo is a programme of activities that provides developing countries with the information necessary to respond effectively to the issue of climate change. Tiempo provides information to help these countries participate in climate treaty negotiations, and to identify and implement appropriate emissions mitigation and adaptation measures. It also provides a forum for communication and debate both within the developing nations and between these nations and the industrialized world.

Tiempo is jointly organised by the Stockholm Environment Institute and the International Institute for Environment and Development. It is sponsored by the Swedish International Development Cooperation Agency.

== Website ==
The Tiempo website provides information on climate change. It consists of "The Tiempo Climate Portal", a listing of selected websites covering climate and development and related issue, and "Tiempo Climate Newswatch", a weekly on-line magazine with news, features and comment on global warming, climate change, sea-level rise and development issues.

== Printed journals ==
Tiempo is a quarterly magazine that gives news and information to practitioners and general readers on climate change issues, and provides an opportunity for developing country authors to present their ideas. It has been in continuous production since 1994. Each issue of the magazine contains a cartoon, some of which have been controversial. Tiempo is currently edited by Saleemul Huq, Hannah Reid, Sarah Granich, Mick Kelly and Johan Kuylenstierna.

Tiempo Afrique is a French language regional version of the Tiempo quarterly magazine for francophone West Africa. It is produced by the environment organisation ENDA-TM in Dakar, Senegal. Tiempo Afrique is currently edited by Djimingue Nanasta, Jean-Philippe Thomas and Lawrence Flint.
