= Mercedes-Benz OM616 engine =

Mercedes-Benz OM616
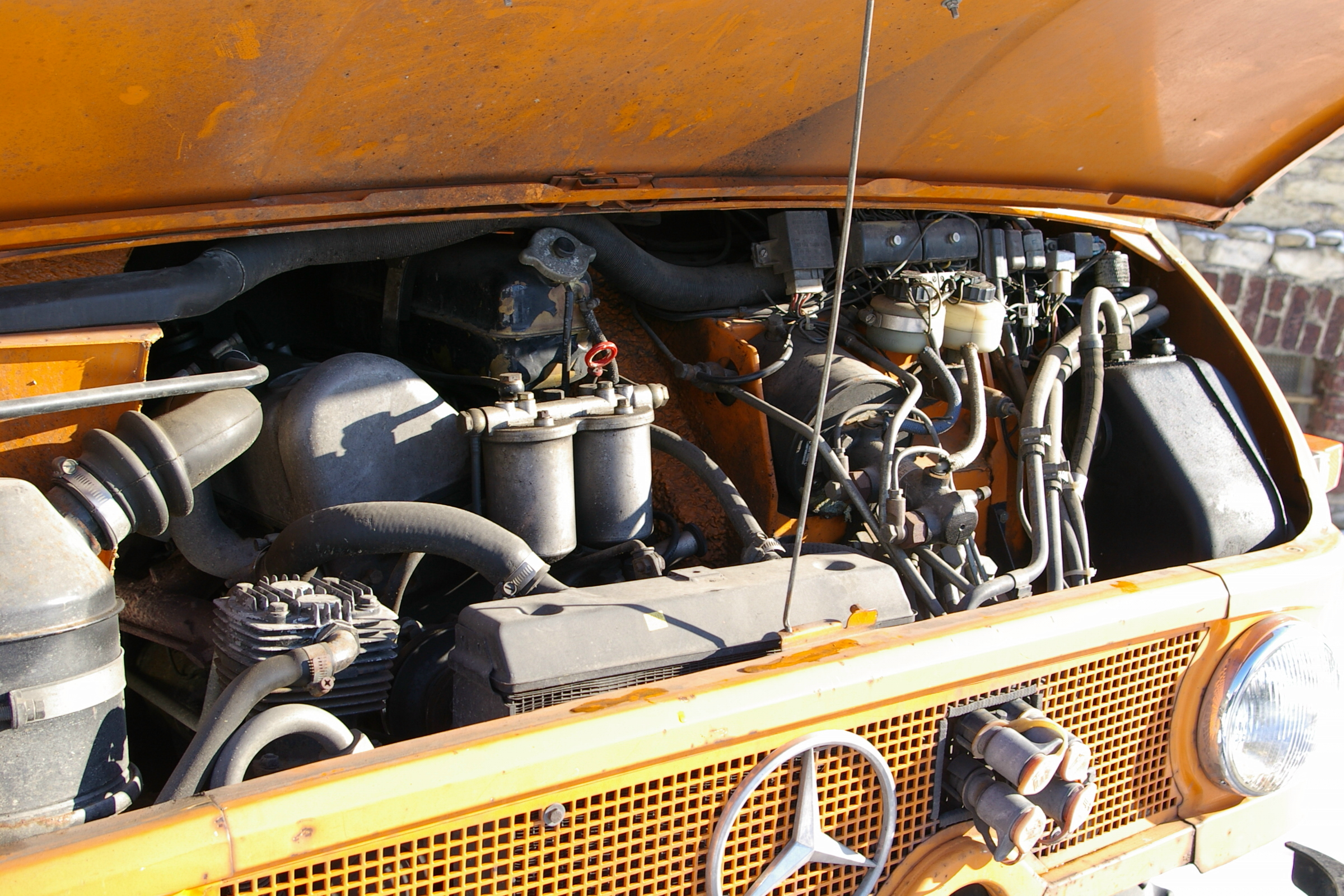
- OM616 engine in a 1980 Unimog

Overview
- Manufacturer: Daimler-Benz, Force Motors
- Production: 1973-1992

Layout
- Configuration: Inline 4
- Displacement: 2,399 cc (2.4 L; 146.4 cu in); 2,404 cc (2.4 L; 146.7 cu in)
- Cylinder bore: 90.9 mm (3.58 in); 91 mm (3.58 in)
- Piston stroke: 92.4 mm (3.64 in)
- Valvetrain: OHC
- Compression ratio: 21.0:1, 21.5:1

Combustion
- Fuel system: Indirect injection
- Fuel type: Diesel
- Cooling system: Water-cooled

Output
- Power output: 48–53 kW (64–71 hp)
- Torque output: 130–137 N⋅m (96–101 lb⋅ft)

Chronology
- Predecessor: OM615
- Successor: OM601

The OM616 engine family is a diesel automobile Inline-four engine from Mercedes-Benz used in the 1970s and 1980s, and produced by Force Motors in India from the 1980s to the present.

This engine was used in various cars, vans and Unimogs over its production lifetime, and still finds use in Force Motors SUVs. The OM616 is a bored out version of the 2.2-litre Mercedes-Benz OM615 engine, which it replaced.

The abbreviation ¨OM¨ stands for ¨Oel-Motor¨ (Oil Motor), which refers to the fact that it runs on oil. This method of naming is still used on Mercedes-Benz diesel engines today.

== Power update ==
The OM616 was a 2.4 L (2,404 cc) engine with power output of 65 PS (48 kW). In August 1978 the precombustion chamber was updated for more swirl and more efficient combustion. The new camshaft pushes the valves deeper so the air and exhaust gases have less resistance. The engine capacity was lowered to 2.4 L (2,399 cc) to satisfy engine displacement tax laws in Europe, but power output rose to 72 PS (53 kW). A similar technique power update around these time was also done on the OM615 and OM617.

== Applications ==
- OM616.912 53 kW (72 PS)
  - 1978–1985 W123 (240D)
- OM616.916 48 kW (65 PS)
  - 1973–1976 W115 (240D)
  - 1976–1978 W123 (240D)
- OM616.936 53 kW (72 PS)
  - TN
  - G-Class
- OM616.937 53 kW (72 PS)
  - TN
- OM616.963 55 kW (75 PS)
  - 1981-1996 W631 (MB 100 D)

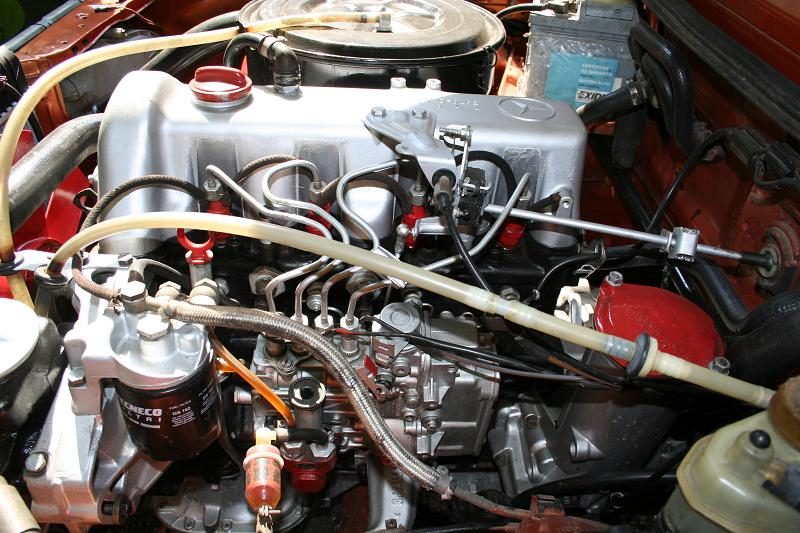
OM616.912 in a Mercedes-Benz 240D (W123)

== For exchange engine purposes ==
Later, more powerful versions of the OM616 are interchangeable with early ones. This is done with many older transporter vans and campers like the 207D and 307D models. It is not possible to change only the cylinder head for one with the higher rating, since the higher valve lift of the later versions will interfere with the early pistons. It is possible to change to a more powerful straight-five OM617 but modifications to engine mounts, the hood, and other underhood components (notably the radiator and cooling fan) are necessary.

== The OM616 in India ==
In 1982, Bajaj Tempo, now Force Motors, signed a deal with Daimler Benz to manufacture the OM616 Mercedes engine under licence in India for fitting on its line of vehicles. This Mercedes engine gave the company a technological edge over other Indian manufacturers leading to the success of several Bajaj Tempo models.

The Mercedes OM 616 or its variants still power the light commercial vehicles of Bajaj Tempo, including the Tempo Traveller, the new Excel series of trucks and the Trax range of multi-utility vehicles. At present, Force Motors is also assembling other Mercedes engines and supplying it to Mercedes Benz India Ltd.

The Bajaj Tempo OM616 engine is configured for different power outputs depending on the intended usage, from a 65 bhp (48 kW) version, to the 91 bhp (68 kW) Turbocharged version used in the Trax Gurkha (Which is superficially similar to the Geländewagen design).

Specs of the OM616 used in the Trax SUV:

- Model OM - 616(D-98)
- Type 4 Cylinder, 4-Stroke, IDI
- Bore/Stroke 90.9 mm × 92.4 mm (3.58 in × 3.64 in)
- Displacement 2.4 L (2,399 cc)
- Compression Ratio 21.0:1
- Max. Power output 43.5 kW (58 hp) (ISO) at 4000 rpm
- Max. Torque 130 N⋅m (96 lbf⋅ft) at 1800-2000 rpm
- Air filter Oil Bath Type
- Oil filter Bypass flow type paper filter
- Fuel filter Dual filter
- Oil sump capacity 6.5 L (6.9 US qt; 5.7 imp qt)

== See also ==
- List of Mercedes-Benz engines
