= Mercedes-Benz OM617 engine =

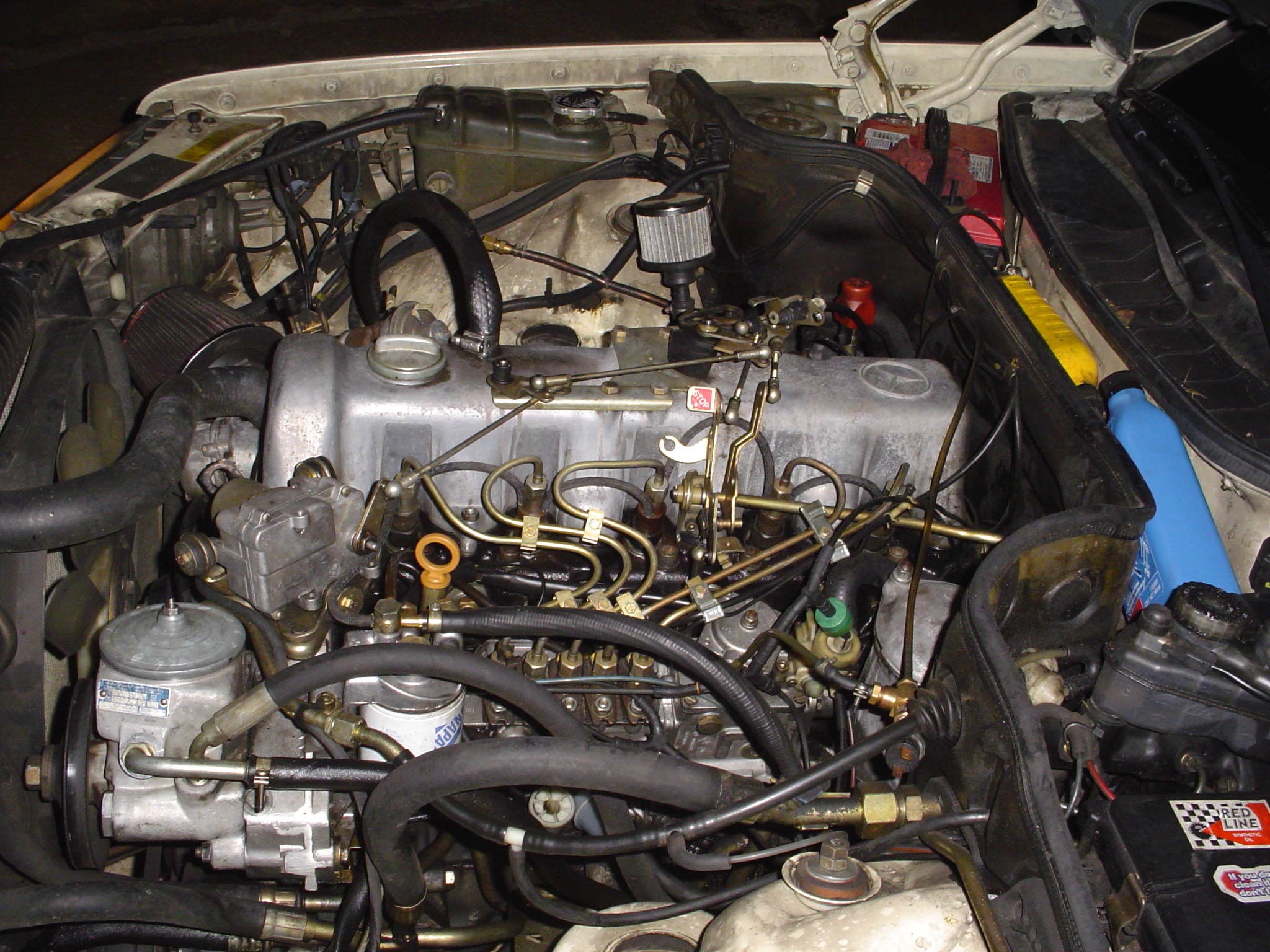

Overview
- Manufacturer: Daimler-Benz
- Production: 1974–1991

Layout
- Configuration: Straight-5
- Displacement: 3.0 L (2,998 cc); 3.0 L (3,005 cc)
- Cylinder bore: 90.9 mm (3.58 in); 91 mm (3.58 in)
- Piston stroke: 92.4 mm (3.64 in)
- Cylinder block material: Cast iron
- Cylinder head material: Cast iron
- Valvetrain: Chain driven SOHC 10-valve
- Compression ratio: 21.0:1

Combustion
- Operating principle: Diesel
- Turbocharger: Only on OM 617.950
- Fuel system: Indirect injection
- Management: Bosch M or MW pump
- Oil system: Wet sump
- Cooling system: Water-cooled

Output
- Power output: 80–230 PS (59–169 kW; 79–227 hp)
- Torque output: 168–250 N⋅m (124–184 lb⋅ft)

Chronology
- Successor: OM602

The OM617 engine family is a straight-5 diesel automobile engine from Mercedes-Benz used in the 1970s and 1980s. It is a direct development from the straight-4 OM616. It was sold in vehicles from 1974 to 1991. The OM617 is considered to be one of the most reliable engines ever produced with engines often reaching over 1,000,000 km (620,000 mi) without being rebuilt and is one of the key reasons for Mercedes' popularity in North America in the 1980s, as it was powerful and reliable compared to other automotive diesels of the time. It is also a very popular choice for the use of alternative fuels, mainly straight or waste vegetable oil and biodiesel, although the use of these fuels may cause engine damage over time if not processed properly before use.

== OM617 Naturally Aspirated ==
Essentially an OM616 with an extra cylinder, it debuted in 1974 with the W115(240 3.0d) chassis. Bore and stroke was 91 mm × 92.4 mm (3.58 in × 3.64 in). It was originally 80 PS (59 kW; 79 hp). Bosch MW inline injection pumps were used, which had flyweight governors and vacuum shutoff. Previous engines had used pneumatic governors, and "gorilla knob" to start and shut off the engine. The North American engines had ADA device equipped pumps which limited fuel at high altitudes to prevent smoking with less dense air. New engine blocks after the .910 had rear mounted oil filter housings, with a combined full flow and bypass filter element. In August 1978 the precombustion chamber was updated to be similar to the new OM617A design for more swirl and more efficient combustion. The engine capacity was lowered to 3.0 L (2,998 cc) to satisfy engine displacement tax laws in Europe by changing the bore to 90.9 mm (3.58 in). September 1979 saw a new camshaft with greater valve lift let air and exhaust gases have less resistance. Power output rose to 88 PS (65 kW; 87 hp). Torque remained at 172 N⋅m (127 lb⋅ft) @ 2400 rpm. In November 1980 the MW style injection pump was replaced with the M type for non-North American engines. Engines were equipped with series wired loop type glow plugs up until 1980 when replaced by the much more reliable pencil type plugs (these had been already used in the OM617A since 1978). Vehicles sold to the North American market had exhaust gas recirculation equipment fitted.

OM617.910

Canister style oil filter at bottom front of engine. Power output was 80 PS (59 kW; 79 hp) @ 4000 rpm and torque was 172 N⋅m (127 lb⋅ft) @ 2400 rpm.

Applications:

- 1974–1976 240D 3.0 / 300D

OM617.912

This was introduced with the W123 series. Power originally was 80 PS (59 kW; 79 hp) @ 4000 rpm, torque 172 N⋅m (127 lb⋅ft) @ 2400 rpm. From September 1979 - 88 PS (65 kW; 87 hp) @ 4400 rpm, torque 172 N⋅m (127 lb⋅ft) @ 2400 rpm.

Applications:

- 1977–1985 300D
- 1977–1981 300D North American
- 1977–1985 300D Long
- 1977–1981 300CD North American
- 1978–1985 300TD

OM617.913

This was an adaption of the .912 to the T1 chassis. It had a downward facing oil filter housing.

- 1982–1988 209 D / 309 D / 409 D

OM617.931 and OM617.932

This engine was adapted from the .912 to fit the G Class, main difference being oil pan changes.

Applications:

- 1979–1991 W460/W461

== OM617A Turbocharged ==
The year 1976 saw the engine adapted to use a turbocharger. This 190 PS (140 kW; 187 hp) OM617LA was fitted to the C111-IID test vehicle, and set 16 world land speed and endurance records at the Nardo test facility in Italy. In 1978 the engine was upgraded again to 230 PS (169 kW; 227 hp) and installed in the C111-IIID and broke 9 further records. Modifications for production engines included oil jets to cool the underside of the pistons; pistons with oil passages; stronger connecting rods; sodium filled valve stems and a stronger nitride-hardened crankshaft. Also an uprated oil pump with separate chain drive was fitted as the turbocharger lubrication required higher flow. Bosch MW injection pumps were calibrated for greater fuel output and fitted with an ALDA device which prevented overfueling until the turbocharger had begun to provide boost pressure. Pencil glow plugs were provided on all OM617A engines.

The series-production turbocharged OM 617 A was fitted with a fixed-turbine-geometry wastegate turbocharger developed by Garret. It has a compressor efficiency of <74 per cent and a pressure ratio of ca. 3.0, delivering a corrected airflow of up to 200 g·s^{−1}. Its maximum turbine speed is 2550 s^{−1}, and it delivers a boost pressure of up to 170 kPa. Daimler-Benz did not equip the OM 617 A with an intercooler. Still, the turbocharger improves the engine's thermal efficiency, resulting in a BSFC of 245 g/(kW·h), an improvement of ca. 20 g over the naturally aspirated version. The original performance figures for the 2998 cm^{3} unit were 85 kW at 4200/min and a BMEP of 1.0 MPa, equivalent to a maximum torque of ca. 235 N·m at 2400/min.

OM617.950

In 1978, the OM617.950 was used in the Mercedes-Benz W116 to produce the North American market-only 300SD, the world's first production turbodiesel sedan. These engines pre-dated tighter emissions laws, so did not have exhaust gas recirculation (EGR). Power originally was 111 PS (82 kW; 109 hp) @ 4200 rpm, torque 228 N⋅m (168 lb⋅ft) @ 2400 rpm. From October 1979 - 121 PS (89 kW; 119 hp) @ 4350 rpm, torque 230 N⋅m (170 lb⋅ft) @ 2400 rpm.

Applications:

- 1978–1980 300SD Turbo

OM617.951

The .951 was introduced for 1981 and displaced 3.0 L (2,998 cc), using a 90.9 mm × 92.4 mm (3.58 in × 3.64 in) bore and stroke. Power originally was 121 PS (89 kW; 119 hp) @ 4350 rpm, torque 230 N⋅m (170 lb⋅ft) @ 2400 rpm. From October 1982 - 125 PS (92 kW; 123 hp) @ 4350 rpm, torque 250 N⋅m (184 lb⋅ft) @ 2400 rpm. Vehicles sold to the North American market had EGR equipment fitted.

Applications:

- 1981–1985 300SD Turbo
- 1981 300TD Turbo

OM617.952

The .952 is identical to the .951 apart from minor changes to fit the North American 123 chassis. It was also fitted to the European market W123 wagon, the 300TD. This was the only turbocharged OM617 fitted to a European W123. Power originally was 121 PS (89 kW; 119 hp) @ 4350 rpm, torque 230 N⋅m (170 lb⋅ft) @ 2400 rpm. From October 1982 - 125 PS (92 kW; 123 hp) @ 4350 rpm, torque 250 N⋅m (184 lb⋅ft) @ 2400 rpm. Vehicles sold to the North American market had EGR equipment fitted.

Applications:

- 1981–1985 300D Turbo North American
- 1981–1985 300CD Turbo North American
- 1982–1985 300TD Turbo
- Military Hagglund Bv206 Bandvagn

== See also ==
- List of Mercedes-Benz engines
