= Acer Tempo =

Acer Tempo is the first windows mobile smartphone series developed by the Acer Inc. This is the first line from the company introduced since it acquired phone manufacturer E-TEN. The handset was officially presented during the 2009 Mobile World Congress. The range includes four different models.

== Aspire Tempo Smartphone series ==
- Acer Tempo X960
- Acer Tempo F900
- Acer Tempo M900
- Acer Tempo DX900

=== Acer Tempo X960 ===
Acer Tempo X960 is the first Tempo Smartphone released in May 2009. It comes with 2.8in VGA touch screen, HSDPA 3G, Wi-Fi, 3.0Mp camera, A-GPS http.

=== Acer Tempo F900 ===
Acer Tempo F900 is a Windows Mobile Professional handset released September 2009. It comes with 3.8 inch touch screen Wi-Fi, HSDPA, GPS and WiFi connectivity.

=== Acer Tempo M900 ===
Acer Tempo M900 is the third handset of the quartet launched by the company. It comes with a QWERTY slideout keyboard and 3.8” WVGA touch screen and it comes equipped with GPS, Fingerprint scanner, FM Radio and a 5-megapixel autofocus camera with flash.

=== Acer Tempo DX900 ===
Acer Tempo DX900 is Acer's smartphone designed for a business use. It is the world’s first Dual-SIM Smartphone to support both 3.5G (HSDPA) and 2.75G (EDGE) SIM cards. It comes with 2.8in VGA touch screen, 3.0 megapixel autofocus camera, GPS, Wi-Fi and HSDPA 3G
