= Force Motors =

Indian multinational automotive company

Force Motors Limited
- Formerly: Bajaj Tempo Motors
- Type: Public
- Traded as: BSE: 500033; NSE: FORCEMOT
- ISIN: INE451A01017
- Industry: Automotive; Commercial vehicles
- Founded: 1958; 68 years ago
- Founder: N. K. Firodia
- Headquarters: Pune, Maharashtra, India
- Area served: India
- Key people: Abhay Firodia (Chairman); Prasan A. Firodia (Managing Director)
- Products: Commercial vehicles
- Revenue: ▲₹8,128 crore (US$870 million)
- Net income: ▲₹800 crore (US$85 million)
- Owner: Abhay Firodia
- Number of employees: 10,000+ (2024)
- Parent: Jaya Hind Industries
- Website: www.forcemotors.com

Force Motors Ltd is an Indian automotive manufacturing company, based in Pune. From 1958 to 2005, the company was known as Bajaj Tempo Motors because it originated as a joint venture between Bajaj Auto and Germany's Tempo for manufacturing auto components. The company is known for brands, like the Traveller, Trax, Urbania, Gurkha, Citiline and Monobus.

Force Motors is India's largest van maker. Aside from manufacturing light transport vehicles, Force Motors also makes engines and axles, as well as die-cast aluminium parts. It has partnered with global manufacturers, such as Mercedes, BMW, Rolls-Royce Power Systems, Daimler, ZF, Bosch, VW, Traton and MAN, for manufacturing auto components. The company also exports to various countries in Africa, Latin America, SAARC and ASEAN countries, Gulf and Germany.

Force Motors ranked 317th (2024) on the Fortune India 500 companies list.

== History ==
Force Motors was founded in 1958 by N. K. Firodia. The foundation of Bajaj Tempo originates with the Bajaj Trading Corporation (now Bajaj Auto), which was established in 1945. Bajaj started assembling three-wheeled auto rickshaws and small trucks in 1951, under license from Tempo of Germany. In 1958, the companies announced the creation of a joint venture, called the Bajaj Tempo Motors, with 26 percent of the shares belonging to Tempo. In 1968, the Firodia Group took a majority stake in Bajaj Tempo.

In 1971, Tempo (Germany) passed into the hands of Daimler-Benz, who retained a 16.8 percent share in Bajaj Tempo until 2001. Daimler sold its stake in April 2001 after 43 years citing little synergy between the two companies.

The Tempo Matador was the first diesel light commercial vehicle in India. The company started production of Tempo Hanseat three-wheelers in collaboration with the Vidal & Sohn Tempo Werke Germany in 1958. The word Tempo (a registered trademark of Daimler) is now generic for any small goods carrier in India.

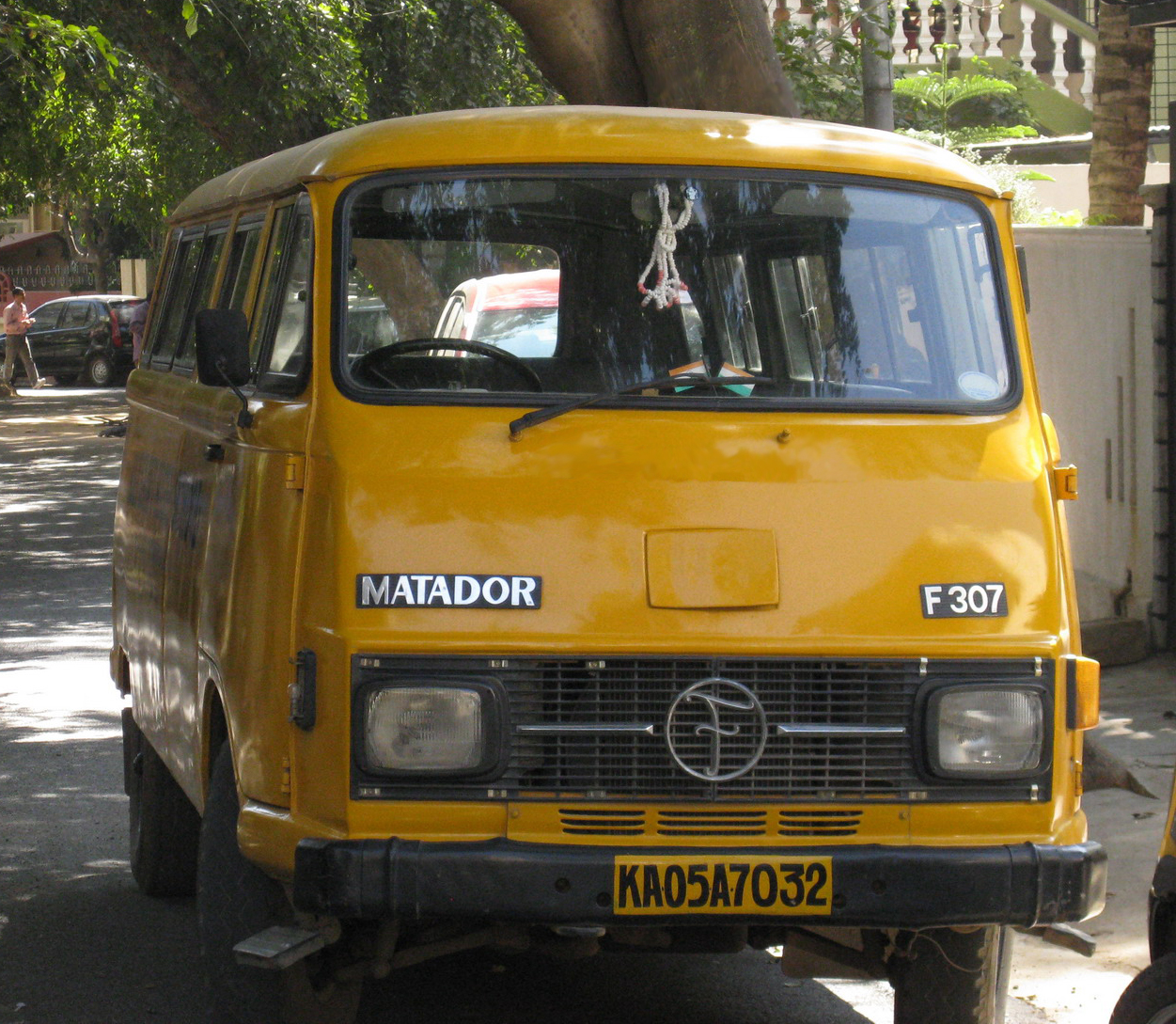
Bajaj Tempo Matador F307

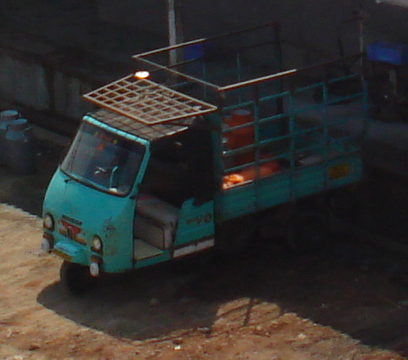
Bajaj Tempo Minidor

In 1987, Force Motors set up a new plant at Pithampur in Madhya Pradesh, for the production of Tempo Traveller. This plant was designed and built to the specification of Daimler-Benz.

In 1997, Daimler asked it to set up a dedicated facility for assembling and testing engines for Mercedes passenger cars to be made in India.

In 2005, the company was renamed Force Motors.

Force Motors signed technology sourcing agreements in 2003 with MAN SE for which payments were made up front. On completion of the localization of the licensed technology and with the request from MAN, a joint venture was created forming MAN Force Trucks Pvt. Ltd to manufacture the full range of HCVs from 16t GVW to 49t GCW. MAN proceeded to buy out Force and MAN Trucks India was established as a separate concern in 2012.

In 2012, Force Motors launched Traveller 26, a monocoque panel van that can seat 26 persons, designed entirely in-house. It had disk brakes on all four wheels and also came with safety features like ABS and EBD.

In 2015, the company was awarded a contract by BMW, resulting in a new facility in Chennai which produces and test engines and transmissions exclusively for all BMW cars and SUVs made in India. This plant can produce up to 20,000 engines per year. The facility was completed in July 2015.

A new plant was inaugurated at Chakan, Pune in June 2016. This facility assembles and tests engines for all Mercedes Cars and SUVs made in India. The new plant has a current annual capacity of 20,000 engines and 20,000 front and rear axles.

In March 2018, Force Motors entered into a joint-venture agreement with Rolls-Royce Power Systems AG to manufacture the 10- and 12-cylinder Series 1600 engines (545 hp to 1050 hp) in India for worldwide supply. These engines are meant for power generation and under floor rail applications.

== Products ==
Force Motors manufactures Light Commercial Vehicles (LCV), Multi Utility Vehicles (MUV), Sports Utility Vehicles (SUVs).

Light Commercial vehicles

- Tempo Traveller (Discontinued)
- Force Traveller N range of vehicles (including Traveller 26, School Bus, Ambulance, Quick Response Vehicle, Royale)
- Force Monobus
- Force Urbania
- Matador (Discontinued)

Small Commercial Vehicles

- Shaktiman 200
- Shaktiman 400
- Tempo Hanseat (Discontinued)
- Tempo Excel (Discontinued)
- Minidor (Discontinued)

Multi Utility Vehicles

- Force Trax (including Toofan, Cruiser, Cruiser Deluxe)
- Force Trax Cruiser Jungle Safari
- Kargo King Grand
- Trax Delivery Van
- Trax Ambulance
- Citiline
- Tempo Trax Gama (Discontinued)
- Tempo Trax Judo (1998–2005)
- Tempo Trax Town & Country 3 door & 5 door (Discontinued)
- Tempo Trax Pickup (Discontinued)
- Tempo Trax Challenger (1998–2005)

Agricultural vehicles

- Balwan tractors (Discontinued)
- Orchard tractors (Discontinued)
- Sanman Tractors (Discontinued)
- Abhiman Tractors (Discontinued)

Sports Utility Vehicles (SUVs)

- Force One SUV (Discontinued)
- Force Gurkha
