= Mercedes-Benz OM615 engine =

Mercedes-Benz OM615
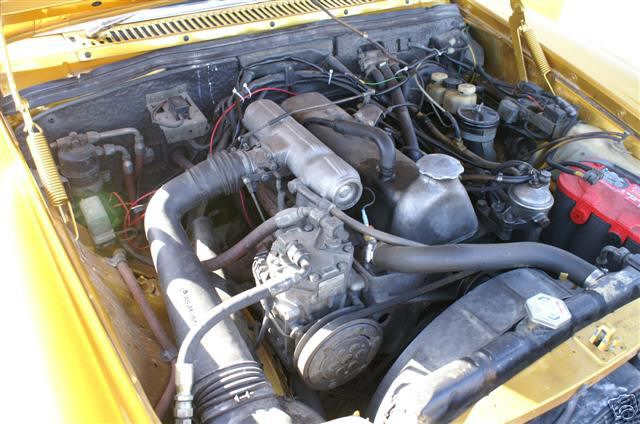
- Mercedes-Benz OM615.941

Overview
- Manufacturer: Daimler-Benz
- Production: 1968–1985

Layout
- Configuration: Straight-4
- Displacement: 1,988 cc (2.0 L); 2,197 cc (2.2 L)
- Cylinder bore: 87 mm (3.43 in)
- Piston stroke: 83.6 mm (3.29 in); 92.4 mm (3.64 in)

Combustion
- Fuel type: Diesel

Output
- Power output: 40–45 kW (54–60 hp)
- Torque output: 93 lb⋅ft (126 N⋅m)

Chronology
- Predecessor: Mercedes-Benz OM621 engine
- Successor: Mercedes-Benz OM601 engine

The OM615 was a inline-four diesel engine made by Mercedes-Benz. A successor to the OM621, it was sold in early 1968 in two versions: 1,988 cc (2.0 L) and 2,197 cc (2.2 L) engine.

A bored out, 2.4-litre version appeared in 1973. This is called the Mercedes-Benz OM616 engine and replaced the 2.2-litre version of the OM615.

Applications:

- 1968–1976 Mercedes-Benz 200D, 55 PS (40 kW)
- 1968–1976 Mercedes-Benz 220D, 60 PS (44 kW)
- 1973-1982 SEAT 132
- 1976–1979 Mercedes-Benz 200D, 55 PS (40 kW)
- 1979–1985 Mercedes-Benz 200D, 60 PS (44 kW)
- 1976–1979 Mercedes-Benz 220D, 60 PS (44 kW)
- 1976–1981 Mercedes-Benz N1300
- 1981–1986 Mercedes-Benz MB100/MB130

== Variants ==
The OM615.940 was a 1,988 cc (2.0 L) engine with an bore and stroke 87 mm × 83.6 mm (3.43 in × 3.29 in). Power output was 55 PS (40 kW) through February 1979 when it rose to 60 PS (44 kW).

The OM615.941 was a 2,197 cc (2.2 L) version with the same 87 mm (3.43 in) bore but a longer 92.4 mm (3.64 in) stroke. Power output was 60 PS (44 kW) at 4200 rpm and 126 N⋅m (93 lb⋅ft) of torque at 2400 rpm.

== See also ==
- List of Mercedes-Benz engines
