= Mercedes-Benz MB100 =

Light commercial cabover van made by Mercedes-Benz

The Mercedes-Benz MB100 (Model type 631) is a light commercial cabover van (M) made by Mercedes-Benz España S.A. from 1981 to 1996 at their Vitoria-Gasteiz factory in northern Spain. The third generation model was manufactured by SsangYong alongside the rebadged SsangYong version from 1995 to December 2003 in South Korea, with another rebadged variant manufactured by Maxus of SAIC Motor from 2009 to 2014 in China.

== First generation (1981) ==
Mercedes-Benz MB90-MB180
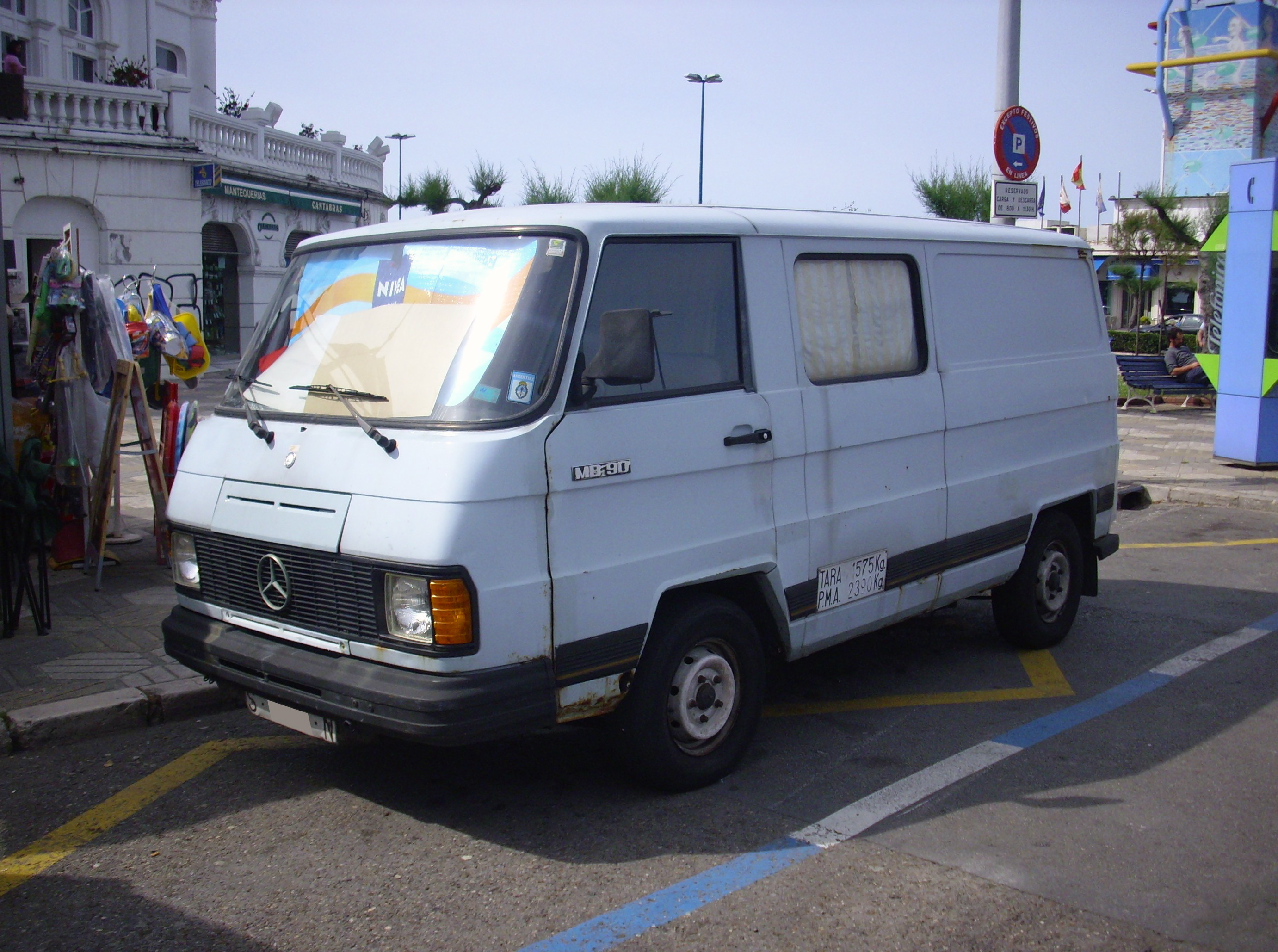
- 1986 Mercedes-Benz MB90

Overview
- Manufacturer: MEVOSA (1980–1981); Mercedes-Benz España S.A. (1981–1986)
- Production: 1980–1986
- Assembly: Spain: Vitoria-Gasteiz

Body and chassis
- Class: Light commercial vehicle (M)
- Body style: Van; Minibus; Pickup truck
- Layout: FF layout

Powertrain
- Engine: diesel: 2.0 L OM615 I4; 2.4 L OM616 I4
- Transmission: 4-speed manual

Dimensions
- Wheelbase: 2,500 mm (98.4 in)

Chronology
- Predecessor: Mercedes-Benz N 1000/N 1300

The first generation model arrived in September 1980, and was initially available in two weight ratings: The MB100 and the heavier duty MB130. Mercedes-Benz España S.A. had obtained the Vitoria factory from Industrias del Motor S.A. (IMOSA) which had been making the DKW F1000 L van there. The F1000 L was a development of the DKW Schnellaster, but with a Mercedes-Benz diesel engine instead of the original DKW two-stroke petrol engine. This was further developed into the Mercedes-Benz N1300, which then became the original MB100-series after yet another facelift. Elements of Fissore's original trapezoidal design for Auto Union were still evident, for instance in the front door window profiles. The new design was offered as a cargo van, a passenger van, and a pickup truck. This model was entirely redesigned during 1986.

The model names (ranging from MB90 to MB180) reflected the payload in tens of kilograms. The MB100 (and the MB90, which arrived in 1985) were powered by the 2.0-litre OM615 diesel four-cylinder making 58 PS (43 kW), an engine built in Barcelona. The heavier MB130, 140, 150, and 180 models received the larger, 2.4-litre OM616 engine with 72 PS (53 kW). The first MB100-series was not exported in any significant numbers.

The MB100-series was initially built by a company called MEVOSA, of which Mercedes-Benz held a 52.77 percent share as of November 1980. Spanish government industrial holding company INI held around forty percent, dropping to just over 25 percent in 1983. With Mercedes having become the majority owner, they renamed the company "Mercedes-Benz España, S.A." in April 1981.

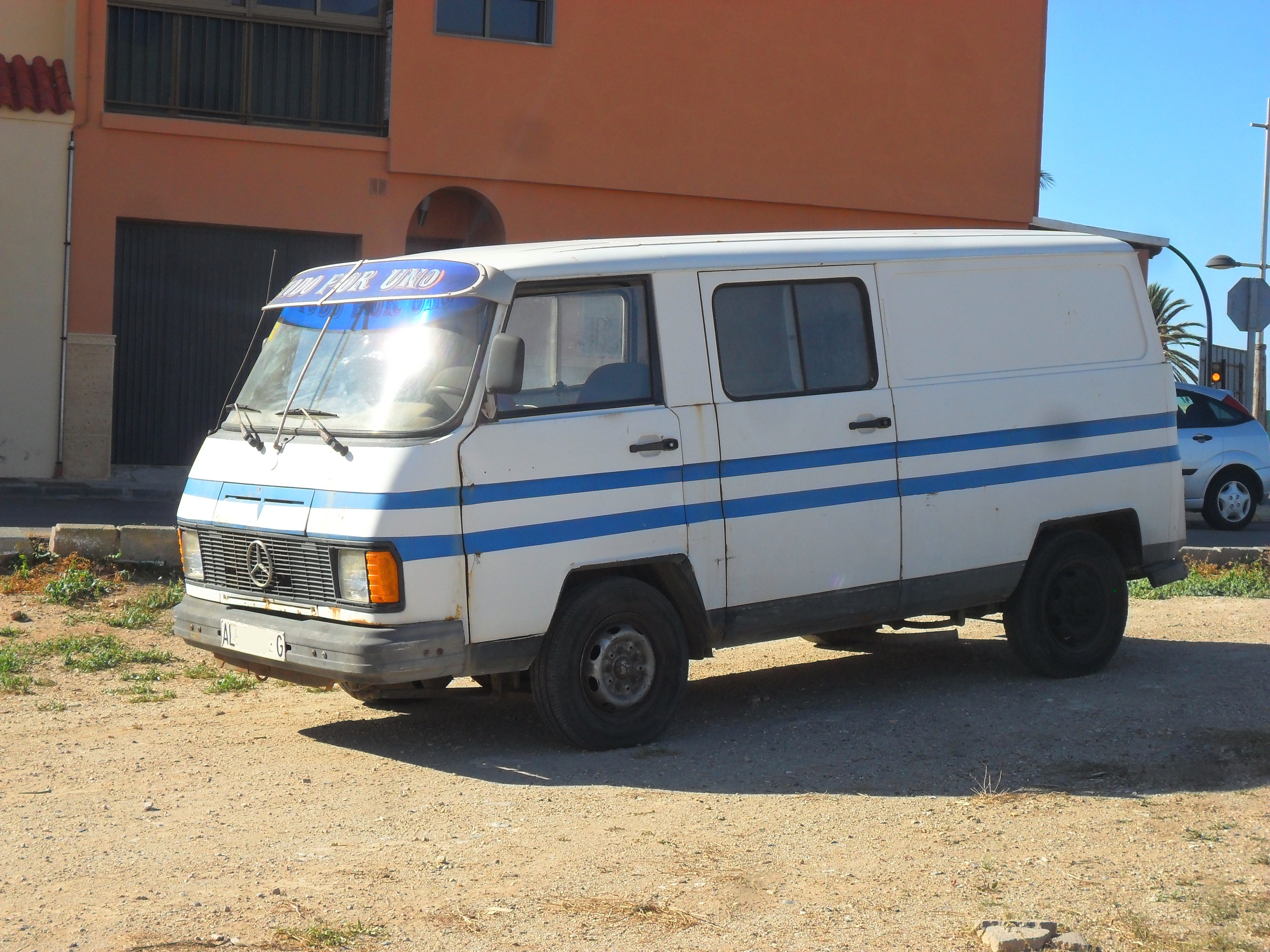
The MB100 still showed the roots of Fissore's 1963 design

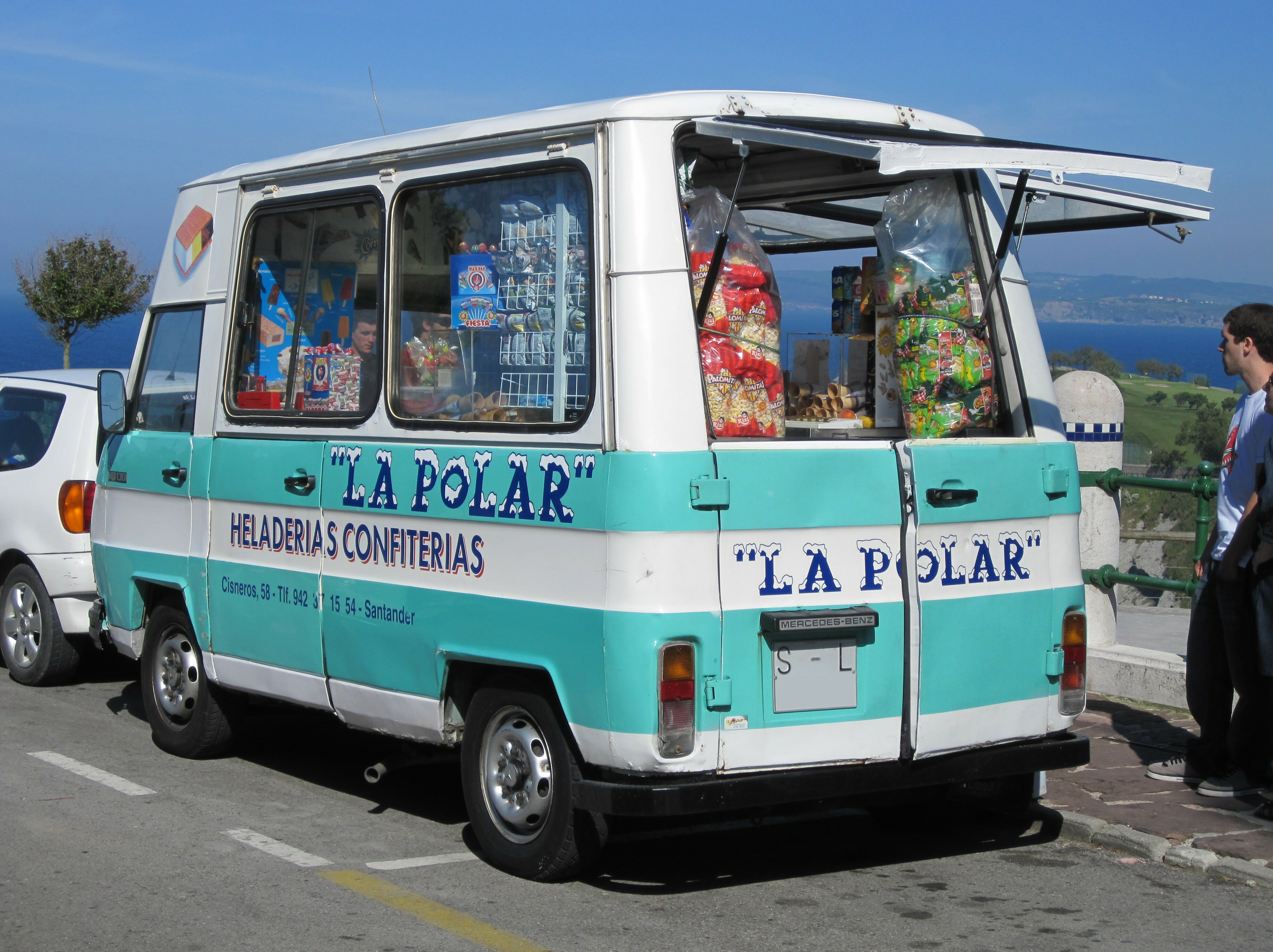
A variety of bodystyles were available, including this ice cream truck design

== Second generation (1987) ==
Mercedes-Benz MB100 (W631)
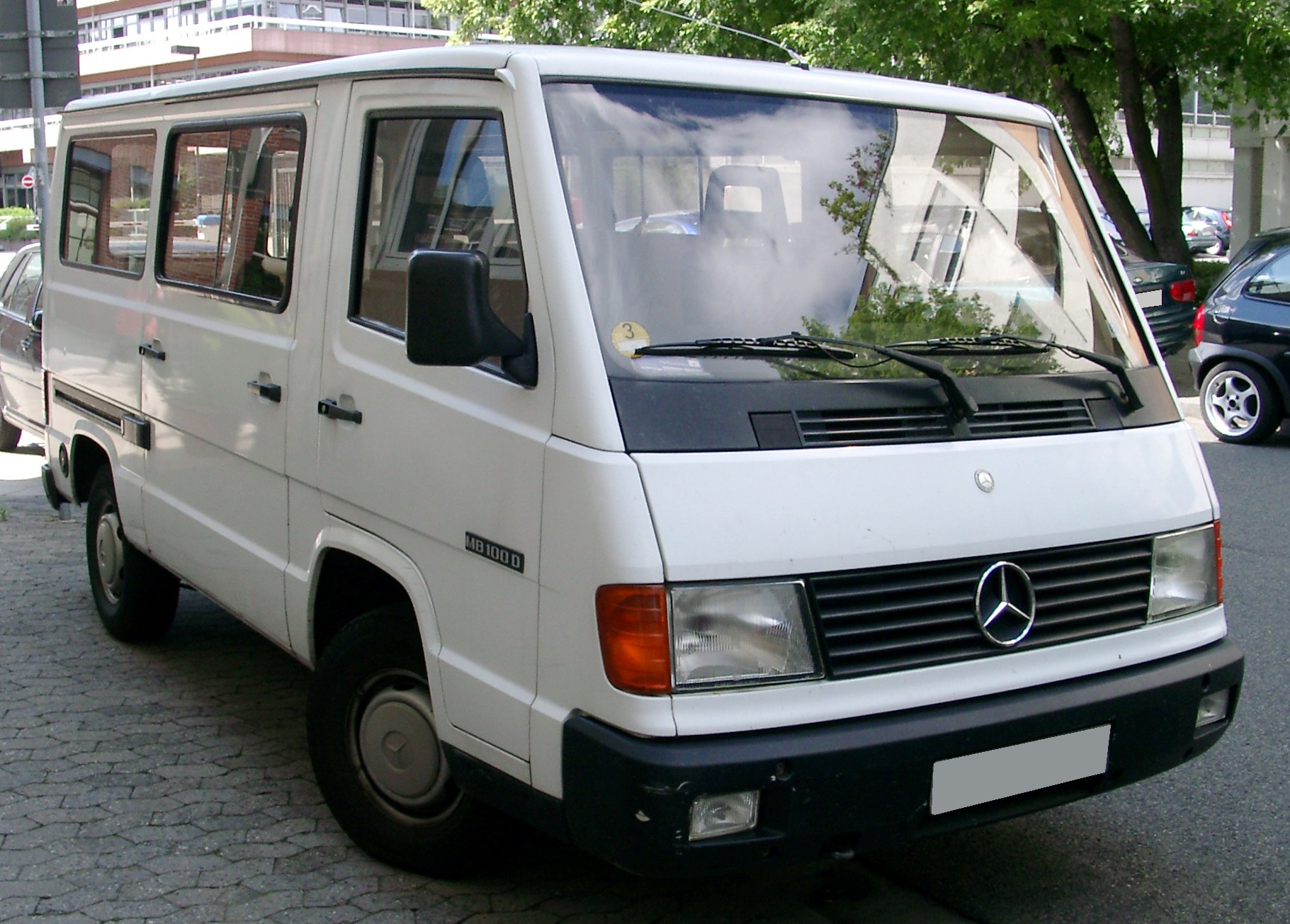
- Facelift model (1992–1996)

Overview
- Manufacturer: Mercedes-Benz
- Also called: Mercedes-Benz Cityliner (Finland)
- Production: 1987–1996
- Assembly: Spain: Vitoria-Gasteiz (Mercedes-Benz España, S.A.); Philippines: Manila (Mercedes-Benz Philippines); Turkey: İzmir (BMC)

Body and chassis
- Class: Light commercial vehicle (M)
- Body style: Van; Minibus; Pickup truck
- Layout: FF layout
- Related: Mercedes-Benz MB700/MB800; BMC Levend (Turkey)

Powertrain
- Engine: 2.4 L OM616 I4 (And also with AMG version); 3.0 L OM617 I5 (AMG version)
- Transmission: 5-speed manual

Dimensions
- Wheelbase: 2,455 mm (96.7 in) (MB100); 2,680 mm (105.5 in) (MB140)
- Length: 4,890 mm (192.5 in) (MB100); 5,340 mm (210.2 in) (MB140)
- Width: 1,855 mm (73.0 in)
- Height: 2,000 mm (78.7 in)
- Kerb weight: 1,710 kg (3,769.9 lb) (MB100); 1,725 kg (3,803.0 lb) (MB100D)

Chronology
- Successor: Mercedes-Benz Vito

The new, very square looking MB100 (model type W631) was presented in Mallorca in January 1987. This was also when the Spanish-made vans were finally offered in Northern Europe, including Germany. Spanish market vehicles received different model numbers reflecting the payload in tens of kilograms, including MB100, 120, 140, and 180.

Most MB100 were powered by the 2.4 litre OM616 diesel four-cylinder making about 72 PS (53 kW), an engine also used in the Mercedes Benz 207D. This was later uprated to 75 PS (55 kW). Also it has two versions by AMG — with inline-4 2.4-liter turbocharged OM616 engine (95 hp) and with inline-5 3.0-liter turbocharged OM617 (120-127 hp). Later, a 2.9-liter inline-five diesel was added, as were petrol four-cylinder options after 1996. The AMG version was further distinguished by different headlights, grille, front bumper, rear bumper, side skirts and alcantara seats.

The MB100 was offered in Germany from 1987 to 1996 as an extension of Daimler-Benz's commercial motor vehicle range. In 1992 the MB100 was given a slanted radiator and an extended front end, intended among other things to enhance safety in a collision. Heavier-duty versions were called the MB140 and MB180.

The MB100 was replaced by the Mercedes-Benz Vito in 1996, but remained available for export markets such as Brazil and Argentina until 1997 when the Sprinter started to be made in Argentina. In Germany, the MB100 developed a reputation for rust, slowness, and a weak chassis.

BMC of Turkey assemble the MB100 for the local market. Later, they adapted the MB100's bodywork for their cabover series of Levend trucks, vans, and minibuses, although they installed it on a rear-wheel-drive chassis, using the 3-litre BD30 direct injection diesel engine from Nissan.

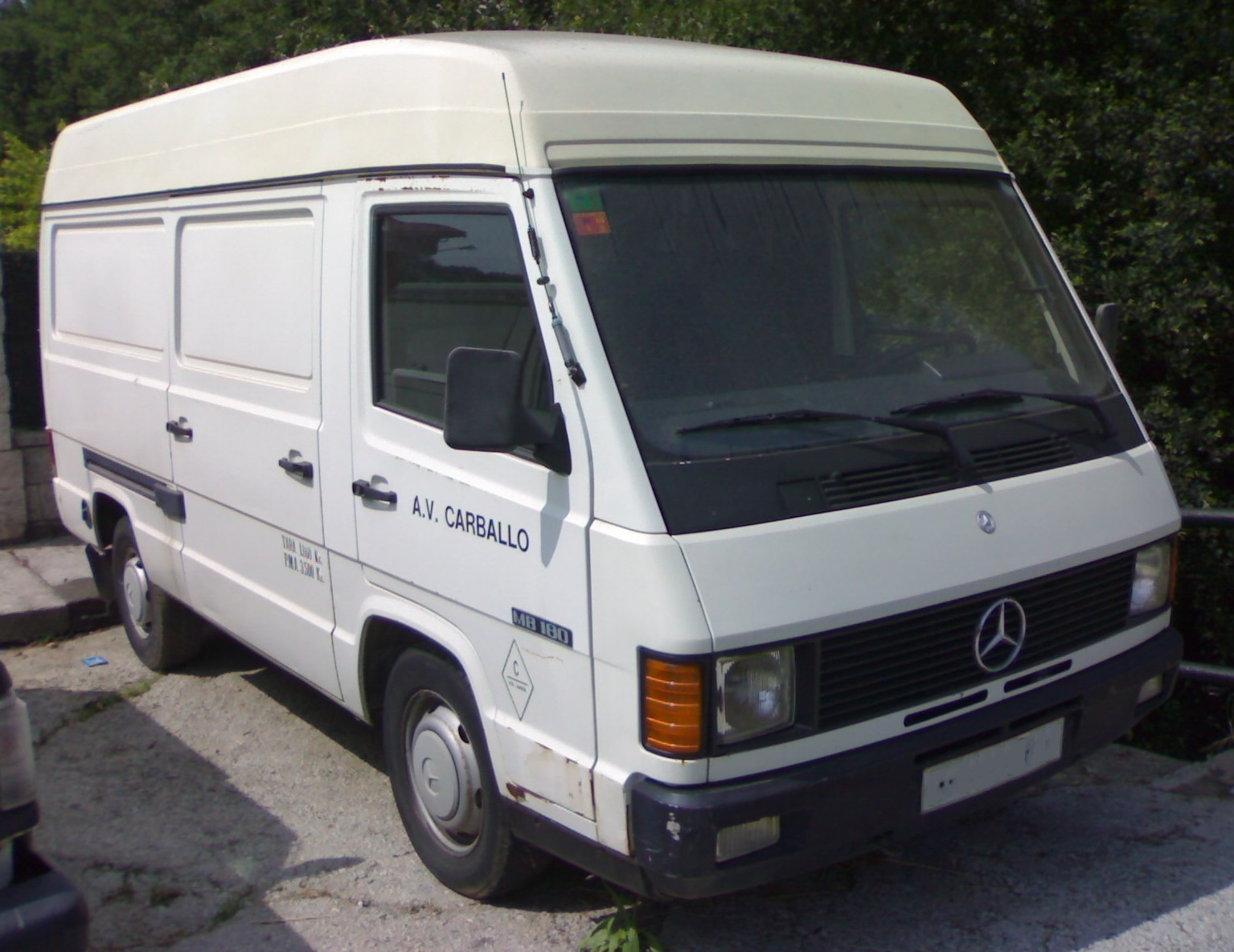
Spanish market Mercedes-Benz MB180 of the original design, high roof van model

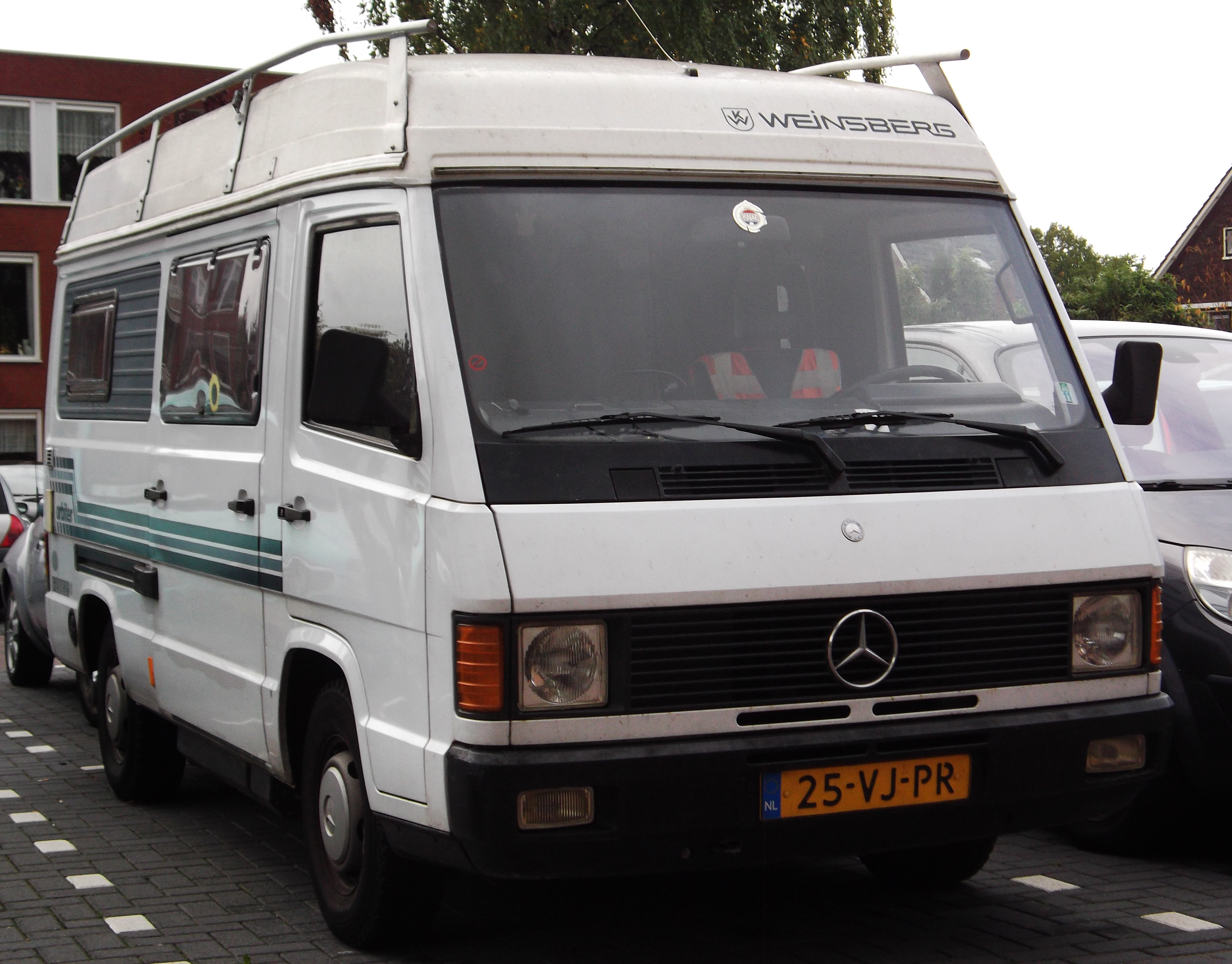
The original (1987–1992) design

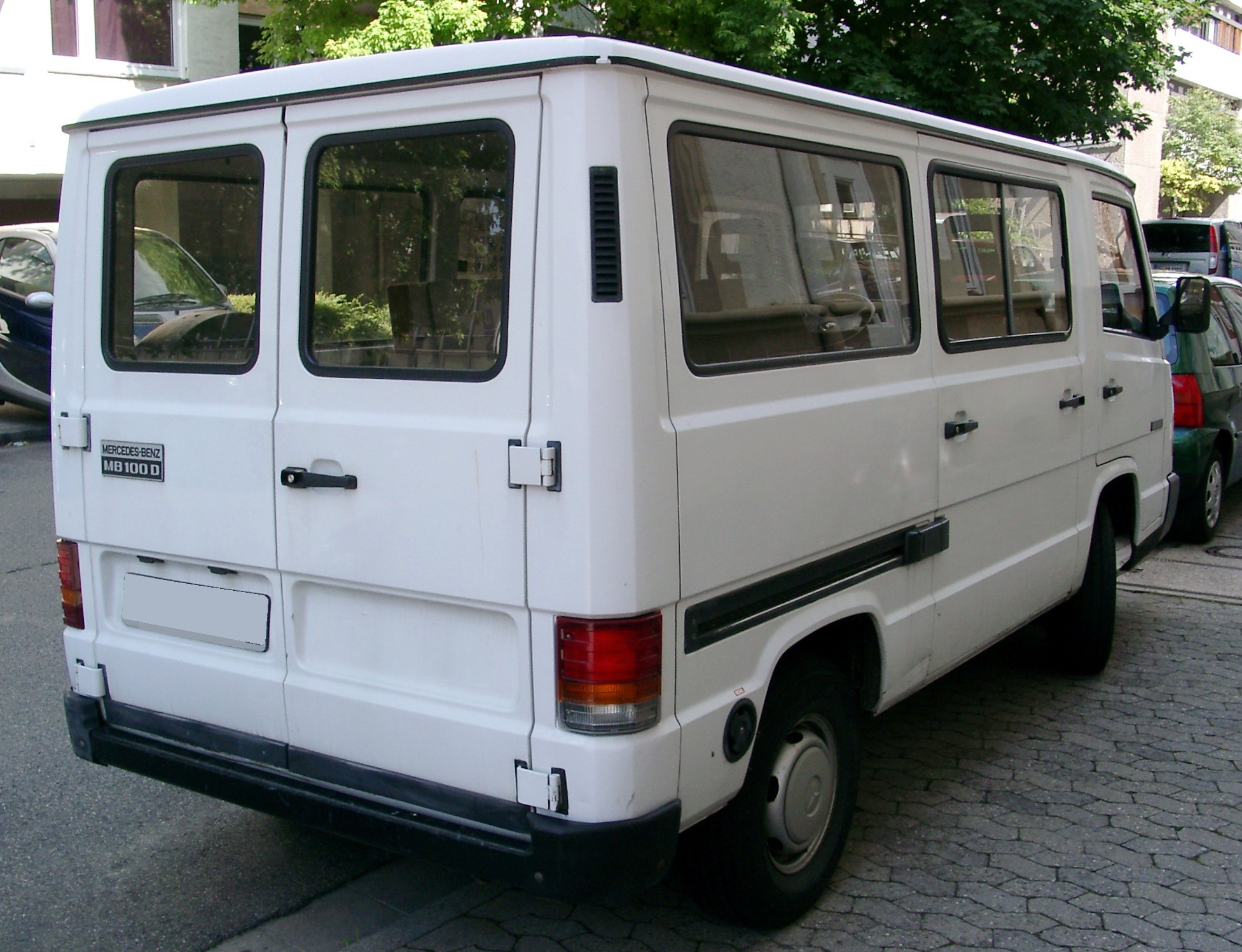
Rear view (facelift model)

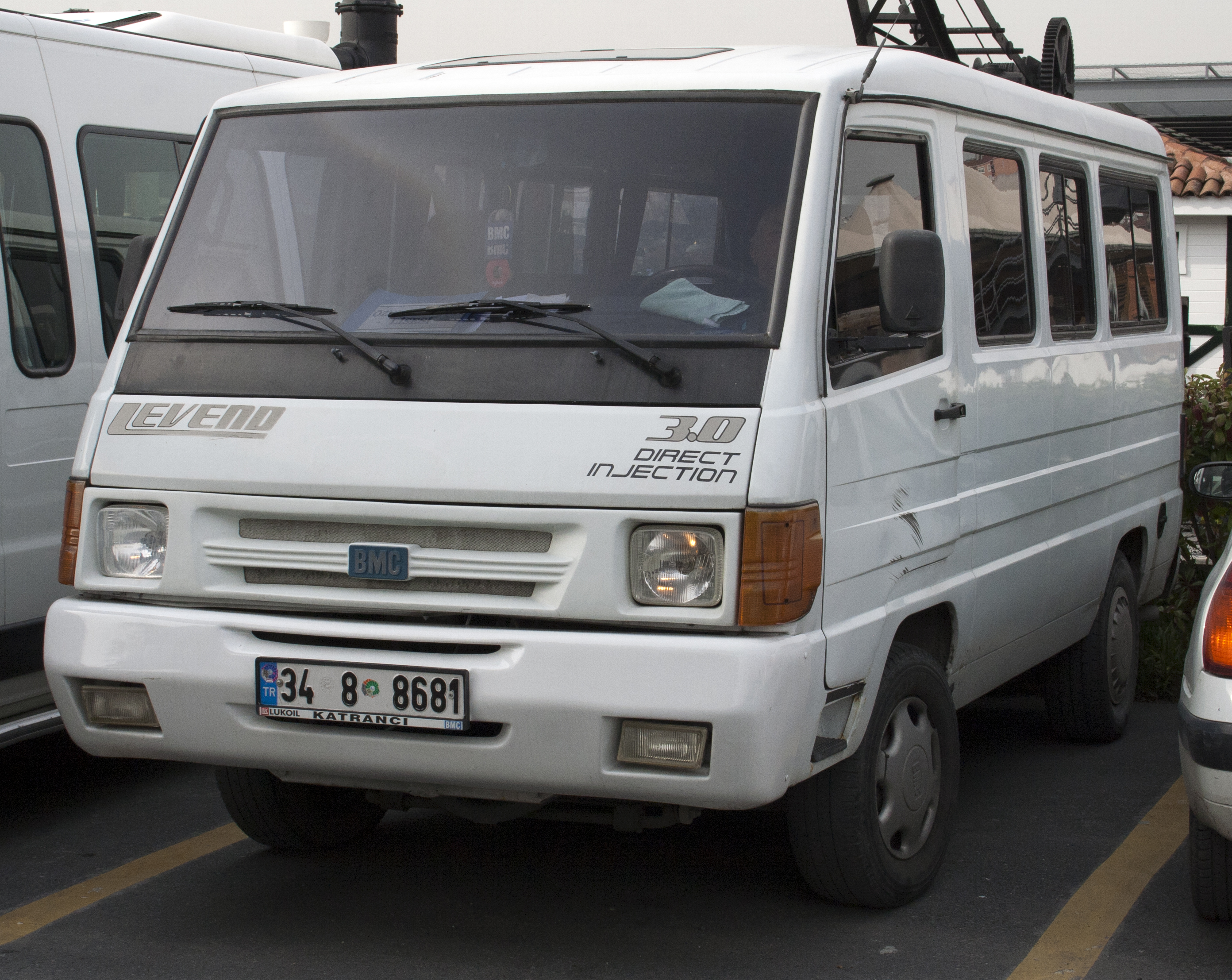
The Turkish-made BMC Levend's bodywork was derived from the MB100

== Third generation (1996) ==
Mercedes-Benz MB 100
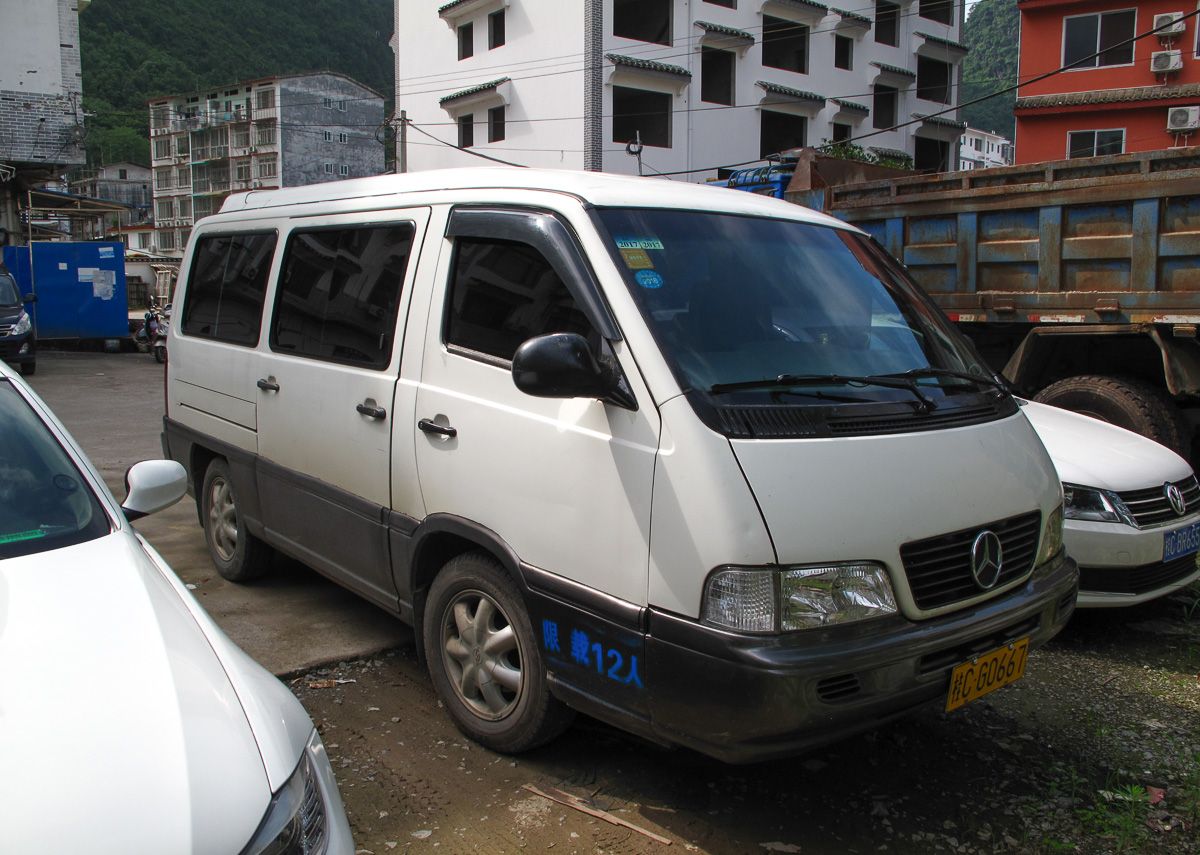

Overview
- Manufacturer: SsangYong
- Also called: Mercedes-Benz MB 140; Daewoo Istana; SAIC Maxus Istana (China); SsangYong Istana; SHAC SH6492 (China); Sanxing SXZ6492 (China)
- Production: 1995–December 2003 (South Korea); 2009–2014 (China)
- Assembly: South Korea: Pyeongtaek (SsangYong Motor); China: Shanghai (Shanghai Huizhong Automotive); China: Zhanjiang, Guangdong (Zhanjiang Sanxing Motors)

Body and chassis
- Class: Minivan
- Body style: 4-door van 4-door minibus
- Layout: FF layout

Powertrain
- Engine: 2.3 L M111 petrol I4; 2.9 L OM602 diesel I5
- Transmission: 5-speed manual

Chronology
- Successor: Mercedes-Benz Vito; SsangYong Rodius/Stavic; Maxus G10

In 1999, DaimlerChrysler Australia/Pacific introduced the MB100 and the MB140 (Model type 661), a larger derivative of the MB100, to the Australian and Pacific markets. These vans were manufactured under licence by the SsangYong Motor Company, which also made a rebadged version called the SsangYong Istana. The Pacific market MB100D and MB140D both used a licensed version of the naturally aspirated 2.9L OM602 I5 motor from Mercedes mated to a 5 speed manual transmission while the MB100 and MB140 used a licensed Mercedes M111 2.3L petrol engine mated to a 5 speed as well. There were both van and minibus versions with the bus versions having sliding windows, rear concealed air conditioning in the ceiling and convenience lights for the comfort of passengers. In some markets, for example Singapore, there was also an electric step which would slide out when the sliding door was opened for the convenience of passengers. They were made in both right and left hand drive depending on the market it was in and depending on seat arrangement, could accommodate up to 15 people. In late 2004, Shanghai Huizhong Automotive Manufacturing Co., Ltd. took over a major stake in Ssangyong's automobiles division and started manufacturing a redesigned version of the Pacific market MB140.

Mercedes-Benz MB140D made in Korea

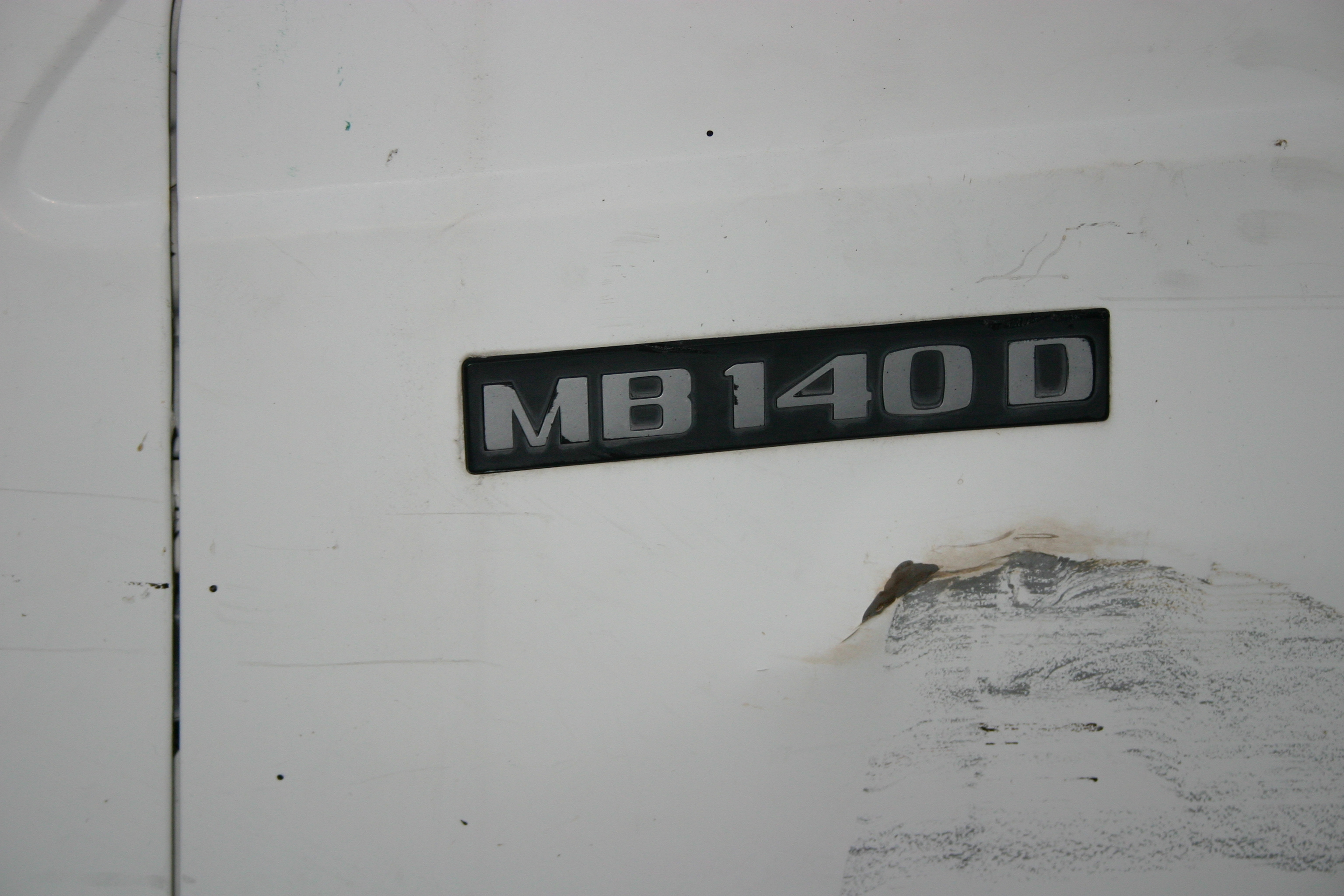
MB140D badge on van

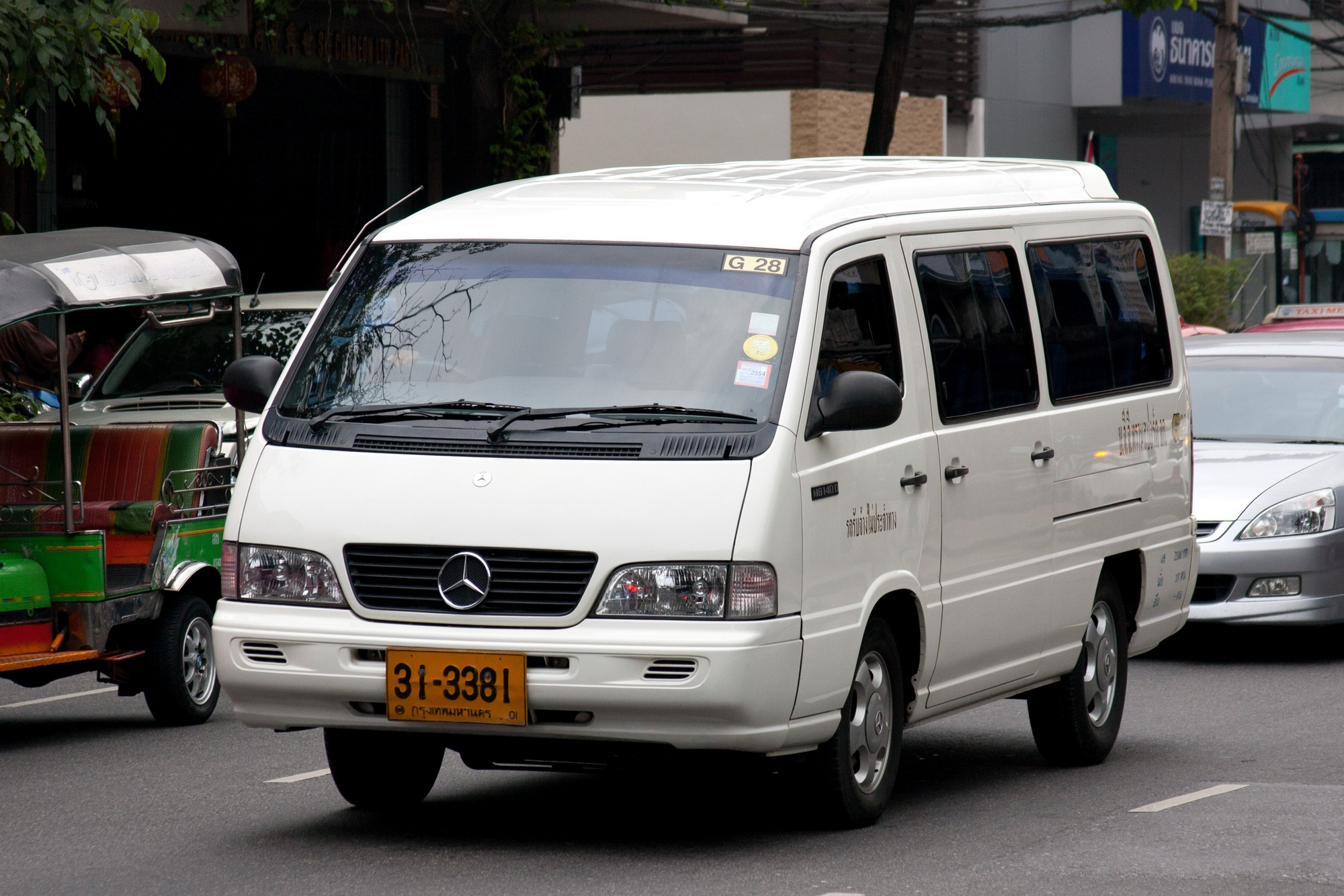
Front view of Mercedes-Benz MB140D van in Bangkok.

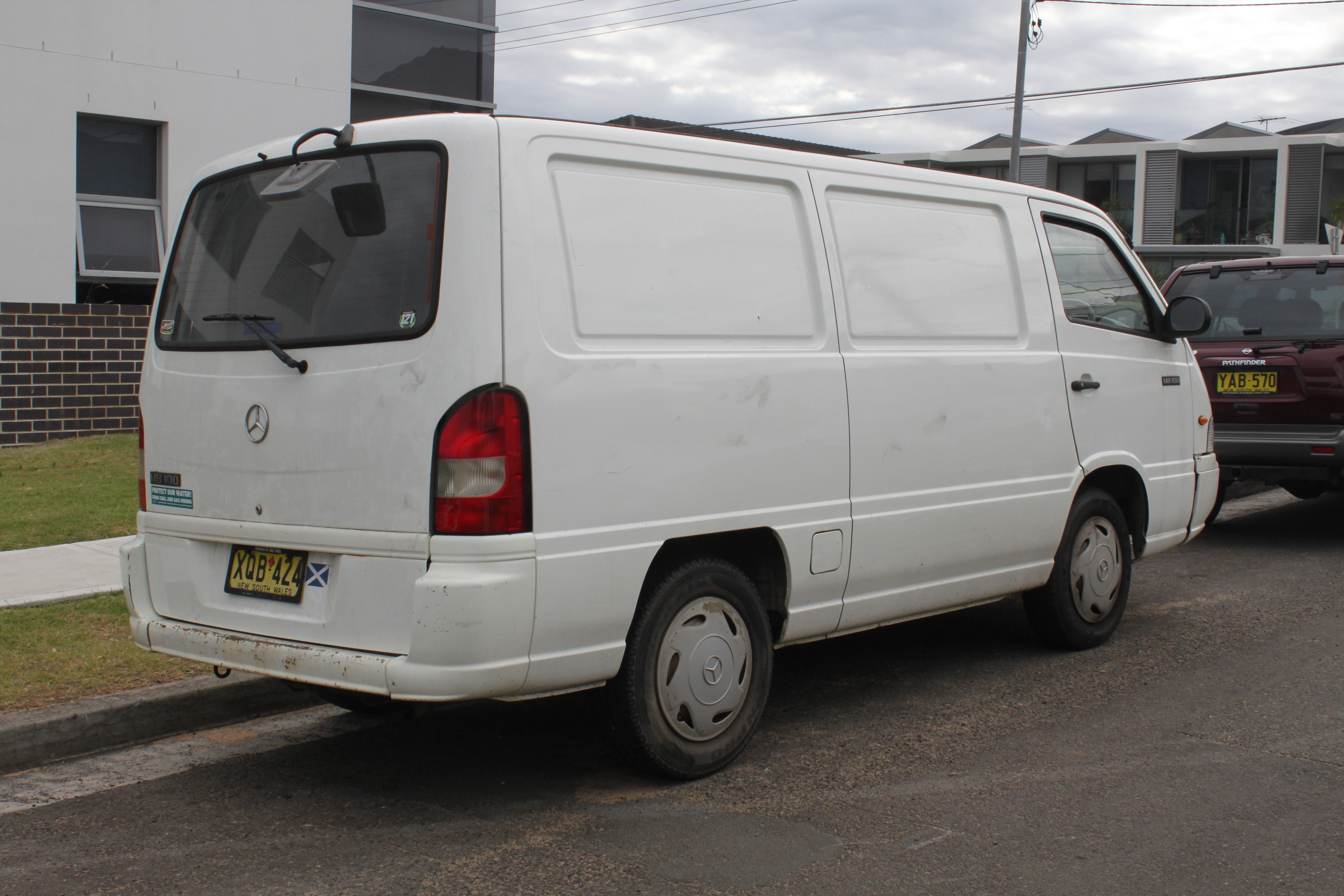
Rear view of Mercedes-Benz MB140D van.

=== Rebadged variants ===
The SsangYong Istana was a 2, 9, 12 and 15 seater minivan and minibus. It was a licensed rebadged version of the Mercedes-Benz MB100 'Bus' variant. It comes with most of the options of the MB100 as well. The name "Istana" is Malay and Indonesian for "palace", which is the name of the presidential residences in both Singapore and Indonesia.

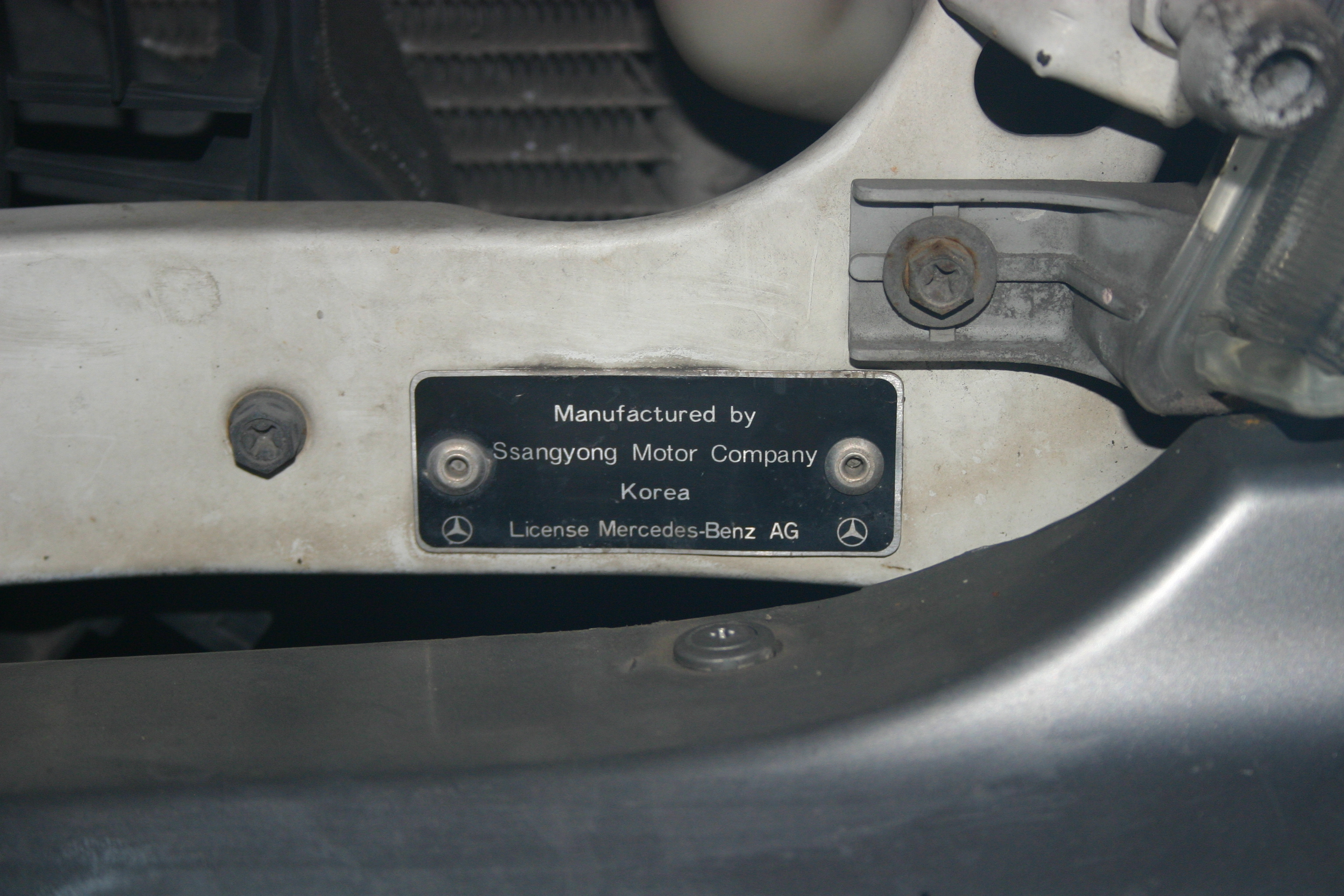
SsangYong Istana manufacturer's plate

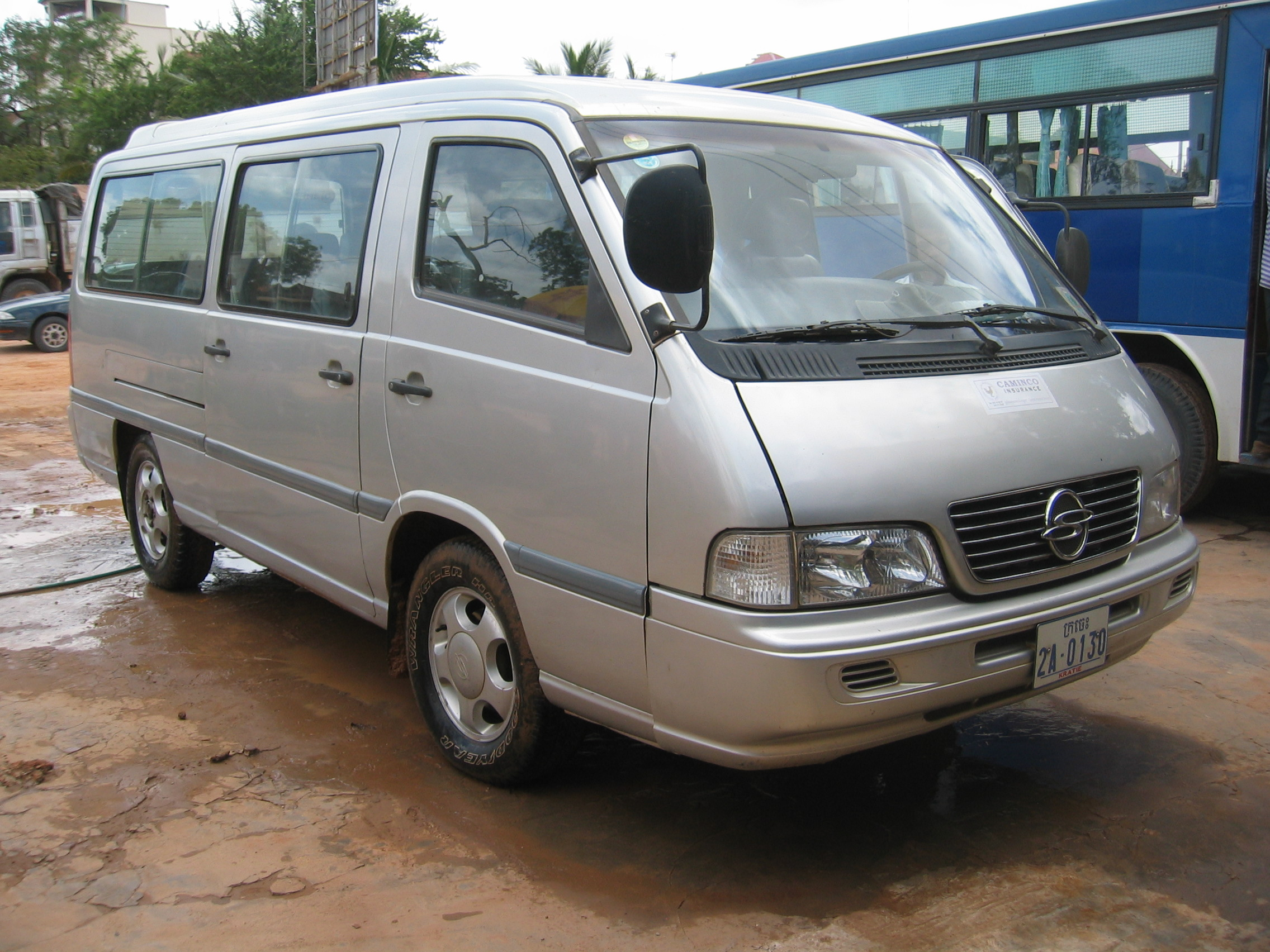
A SsangYong Istana in Cambodia, 2008

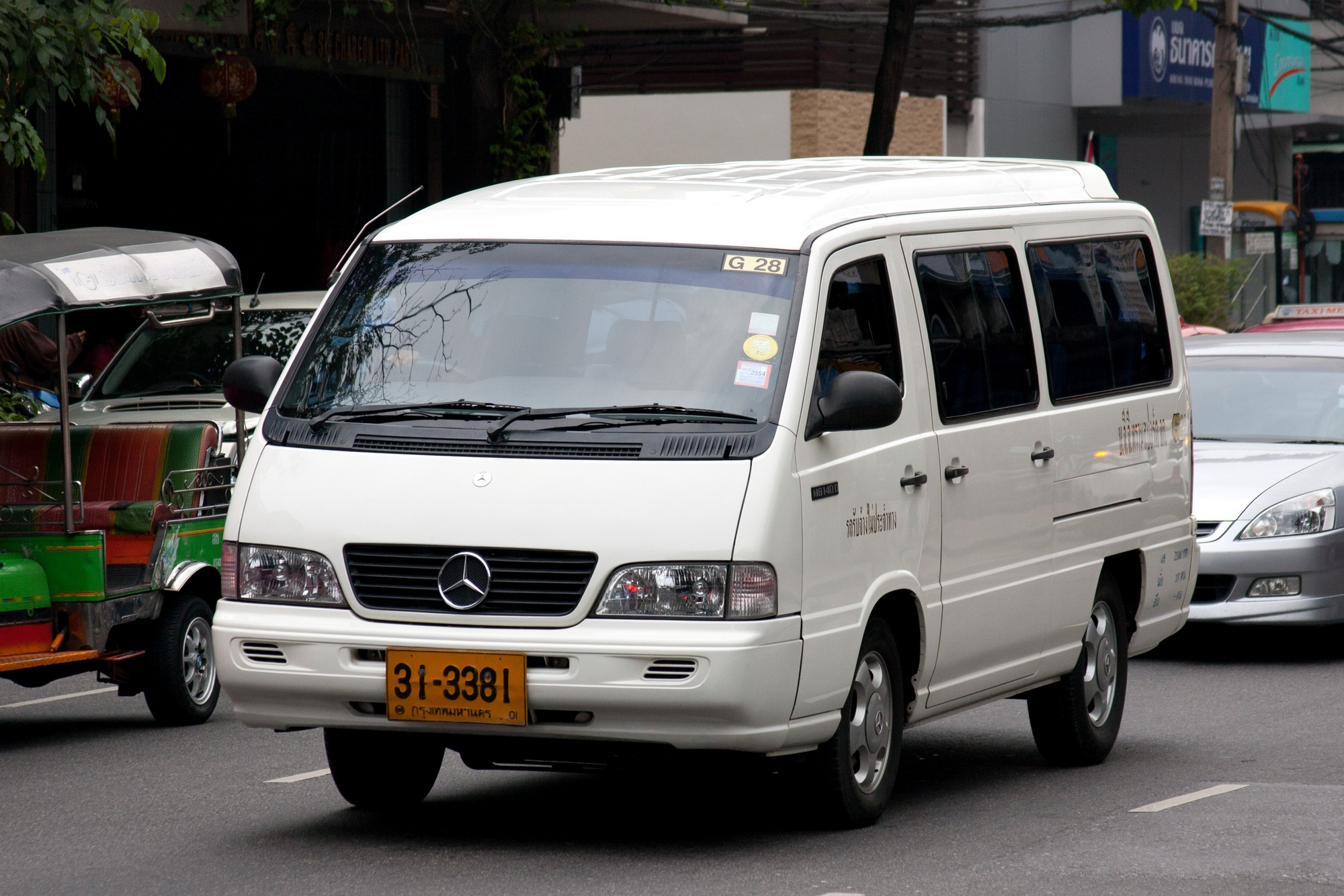
A Mercedes-Benz MB 140 D in Bangkok

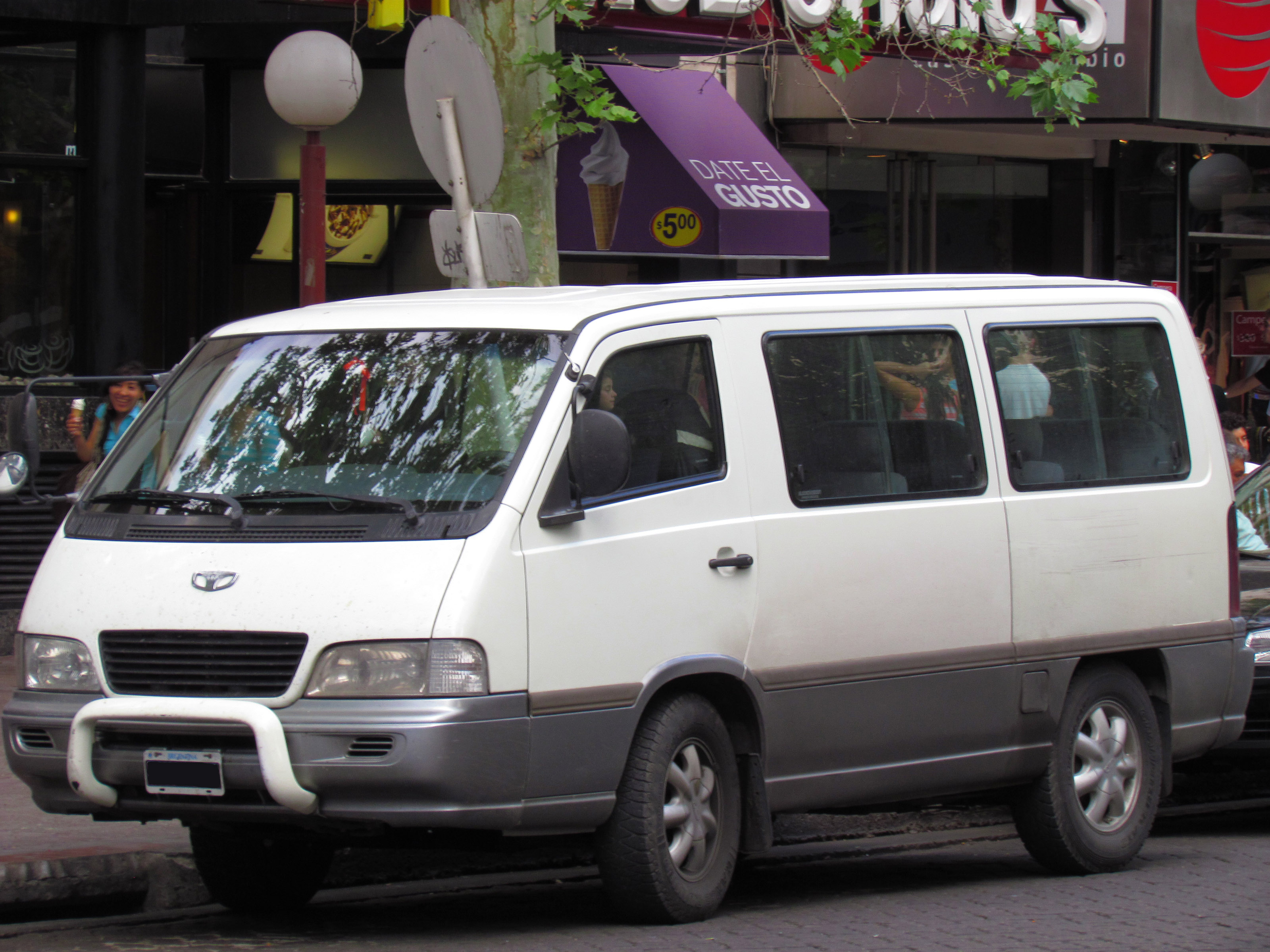
Daewoo Istana in Chile

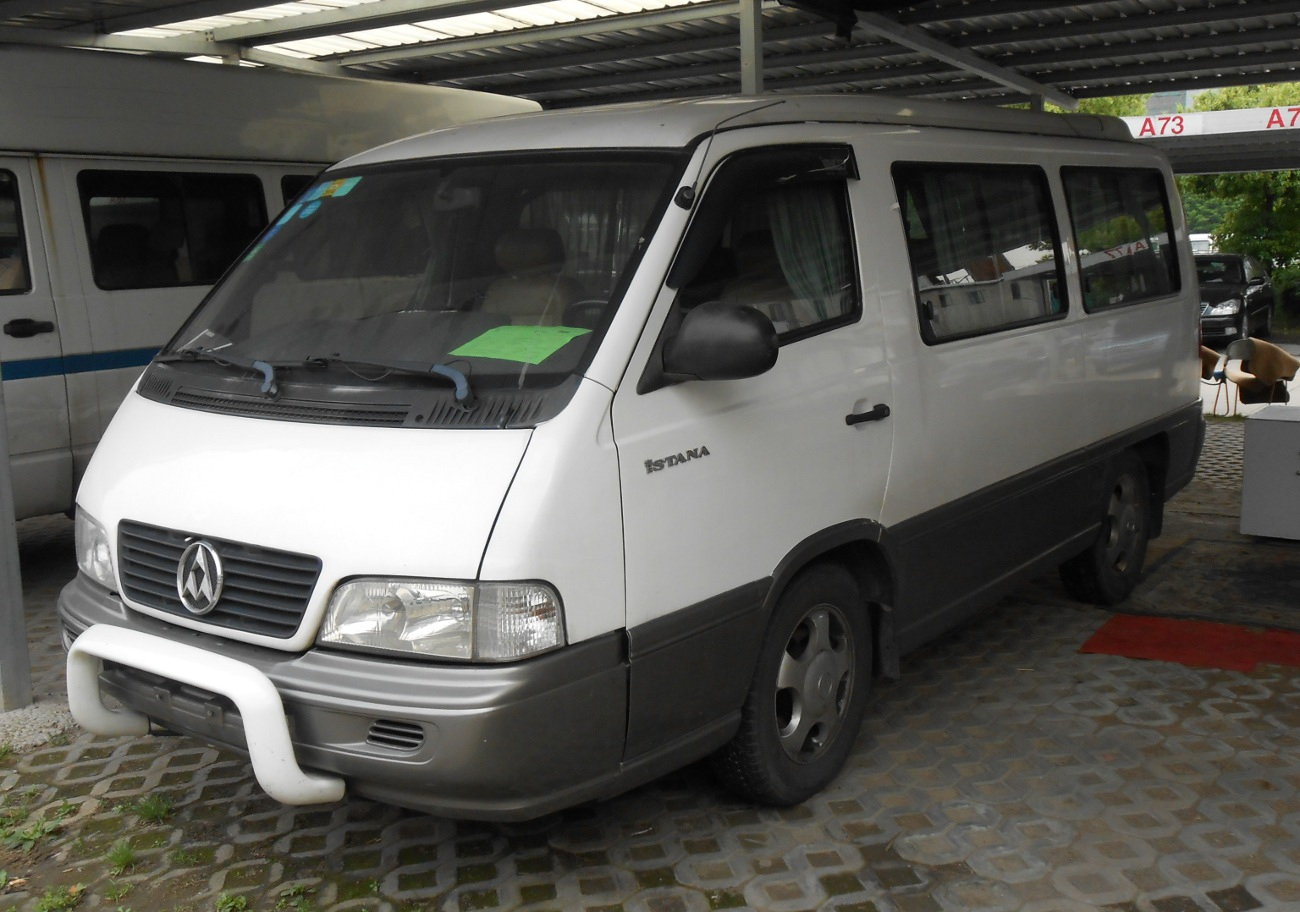
SAIC Maxus Istana

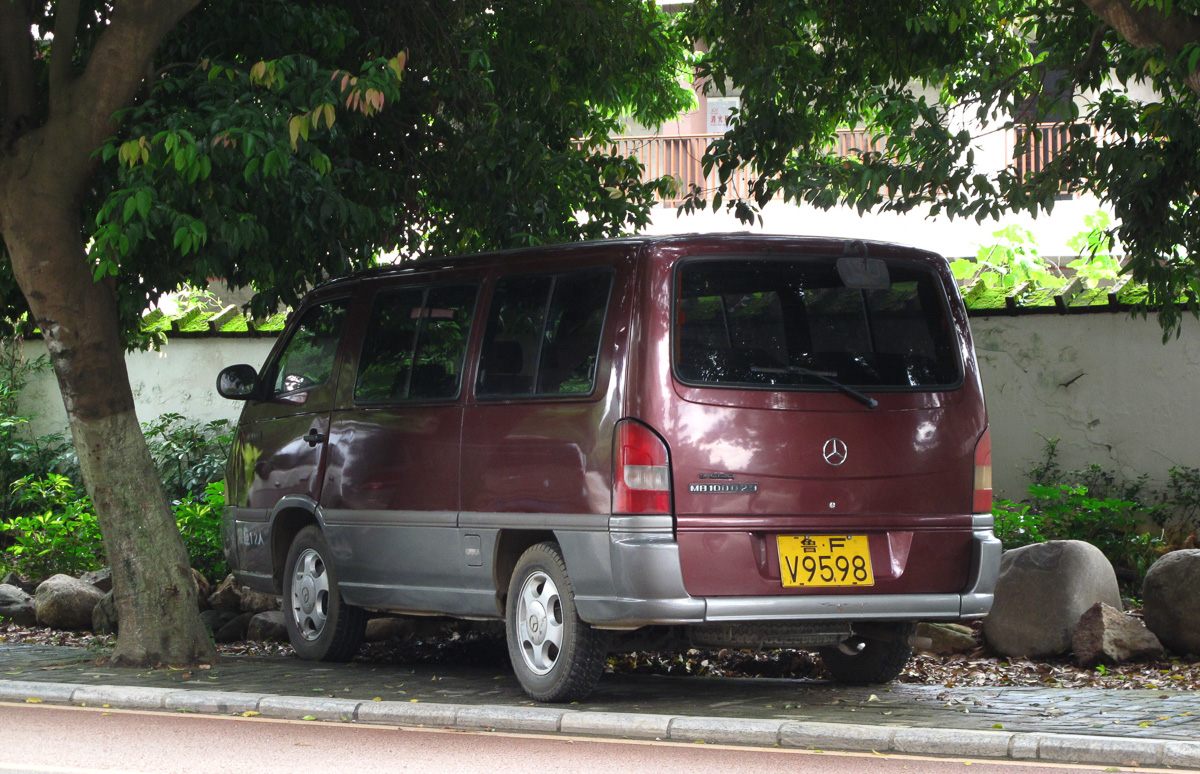
Sanxing SXZ6492 in China
