= Mercedes-Benz N1300 =

Mercedes-Benz N 1300
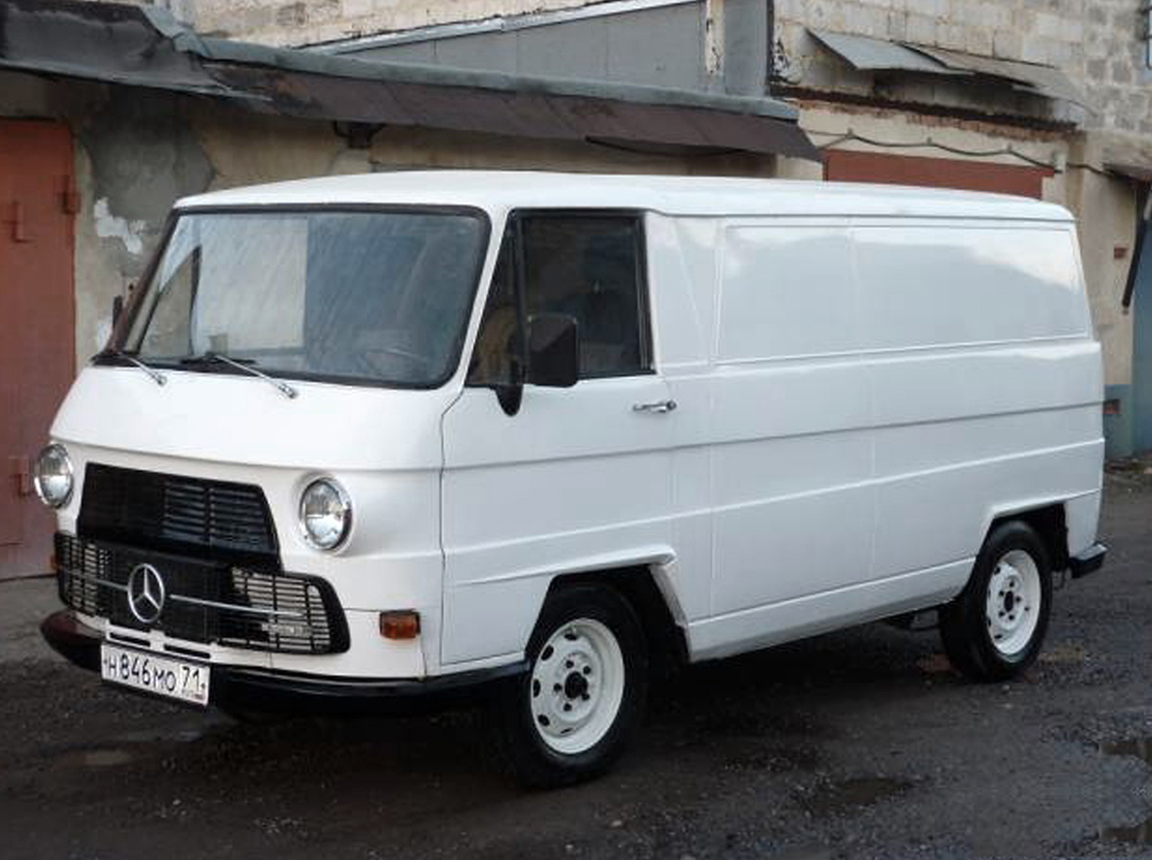

Overview
- Manufacturer: IMOSA (1963–1972); MEVOSA (1972–1980)
- Also called: Mercedes-Benz N 1000; Auto-Union F1000; Auto Union-DKW Schnellaster; DKW F1000
- Production: 1963–1980
- Assembly: Spain: Vitoria-Gasteiz

Body and chassis
- Class: Light commercial vehicle
- Body style: panel van, minibus, flatbed
- Layout: FWD layout

Powertrain
- Engine: 981 cc AU1000 two-stroke I3; 1767 cc OM636 diesel I4; 1988 cc OM615 diesel I4

Dimensions
- Wheelbase: 2,500 mm (98.4 in)
- Length: 4,395 mm (173.0 in)
- Height: 1,950 mm (76.8 in)
- Curb weight: 1,250–1,450 kg (2,760–3,200 lb)

Chronology
- Predecessor: DKW F89 L
- Successor: Mercedes-Benz MB100

The Mercedes-Benz N1300 is a light commercial vehicle designed and manufactured by the Spanish subsidiary IMOSA (Industrias del Motor SA) based in Vitoria-Gasteiz, in the Basque Country, north of Spain. Its body had its roots in the Fissore-designed DKW F1000 L (or DKW-IMOSA F1000) van of 1963.

== DKW F 1000 ==
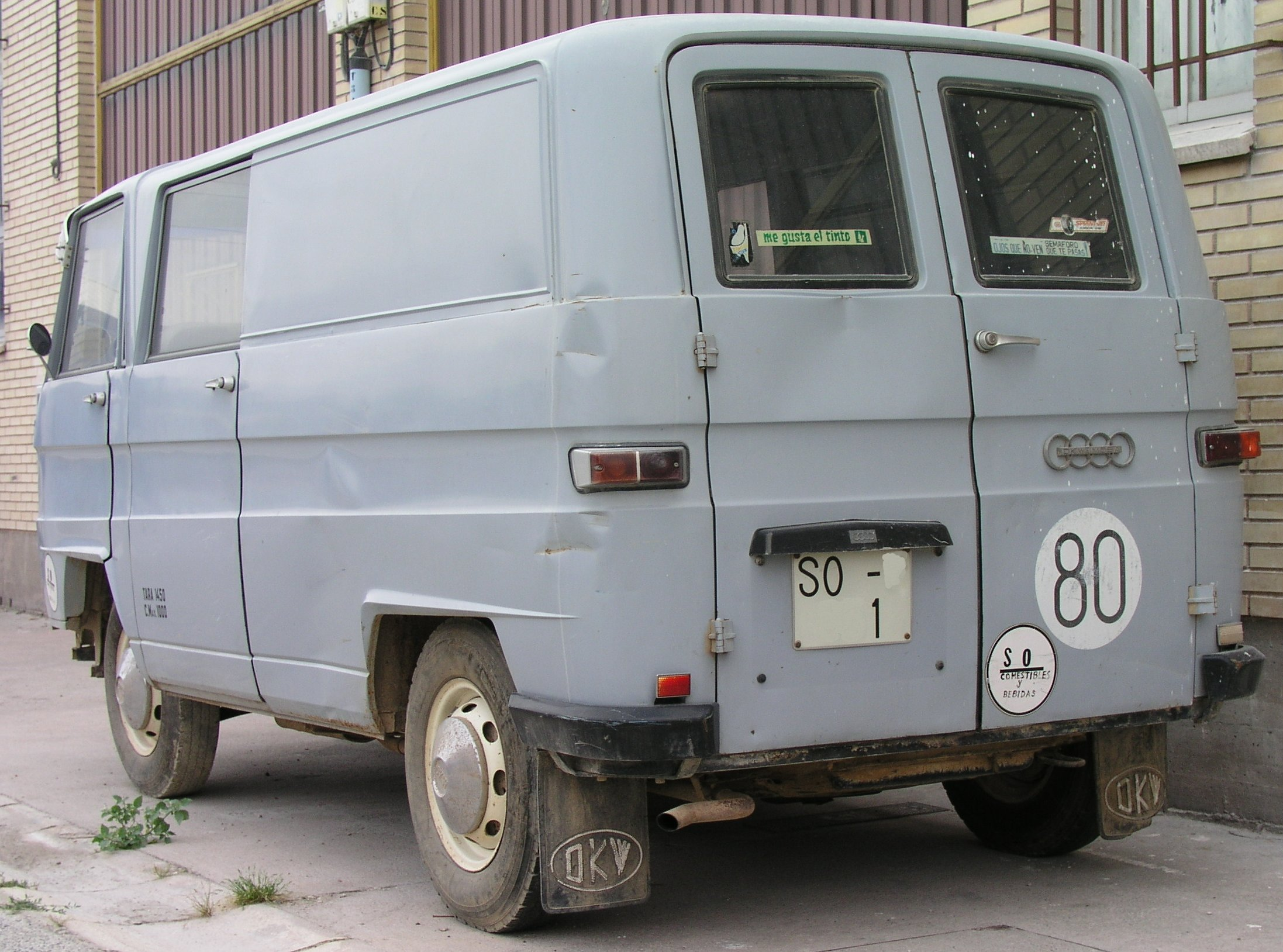
DKW F 1000, rear view

The original Auto Union F 1000-L was presented in 1963. It was also marketed as a DKW, sometimes with both badges, and later also as the IMOSA-DKW. It was originally available in three different versions: cargo van, passenger van with windows, and chassis with cab. A variety of other bodystyles also appeared over the years, including a double-cab truck and a thirteen-seat microbus. The name was derived from the maximum load permitted: 1,000 kilos plus a driver. The maximum speed in optimal conditions was 100 km/h. The DKW F 1000 was the modern successor of the DKW F89 L and used the Auto Union 1000's 40 PS (29 kW) 1-liter two-stroke three-cylinder engine, mounted between the front seats and driving the front wheels. The four-speed manual transmission had an unsynchronized first gear.

In 1964 the DKW F 1000-D was introduced, with a 1.8-liter Mercedes-Benz diesel four-cylinder engine built by ENMASA in Barcelona (the earliest cars received engines imported from Germany). The OM636 engine produces 43 PS (32 kW) DIN at 3500 rpm according to period brochures. The diesels, in need of additional cooling, received an additional grille, replacing the vented metal pressing above the low original design with its broad horizontal bands. The diesel, while much more economical in operation, cost about fifty percent more than the two-stroke design.

In 1965 the heavier-duty F1500-D (diesel only) was introduced. In 1966 all models received a minor facelift, with a double, trapezoidal mesh grille now fitted to the two-strokes as well as diesels. 1968 was the last year that the two-stroke engine was available, leaving only diesels for the remainder of the production. A wide variety of bodystyles were developed as production continued, including a double-cab pickup, a beverage delivery vehicle, a butane gas canister transporter, high-roofed models, an ambulance and others. The F 1000 dominated the marketplace, with a 54% market share over the 12 years it was built, reaching seventy percent in some years. Around 120,000 were built of all F 1000 types. The DKW F 1000 was briefly exported back to Germany as the "Auto Union-DKW Schnellaster", but this ended in 1965 after Volkswagen's 1964 acquisition of Auto Union, the company that built DKWs.

=== Company changes ===
Mercedes-Benz, who had owned Auto Union since 1958, ended up retaining the Spanish subsidiary (as well as Auto Union's main commercial vehicle plant in Düsseldorf) after the Volkswagen takeover. After the sale of Auto Union, Volkswagen assumed Mercedes-Benz' 25 percent share in IMOSA. Volkswagen intended to build 125,000 passenger cars annually in Spain, but the proposal was rejected by the Spanish government in 1966. INI, Spain's governmental industrial holding company, opposed the passenger car plans in order to protect the SEAT company. Nonetheless, Volkswagen went on to increase their stake in IMOSA to 75 percent by 1969. Daimler-Benz, meanwhile, kept their interest in engine manufacturers ENMASA - which was merged with Mercedes' Madrid-based distributor IDASA to form a new company called CISPALSA (Compañia Hispano Alemana de Productos Mercedes-Benz, S.A.) in February 1969. Neither of the two Spanish-German subsidiaries, however, was very successful. In June 1972 the two German manufacturers merged their operations into a new company called MEVOSA (Compañía Hispano Alemana de Productos Mercedes-Benz y Volkswagen, S.A., the "German-Spanish Company for Manufacturing Mercedes-Benz and Volkswagen Products"), of which each held a 26.8% share. Volkswagen pulled out of the Spanish operation in November 1976, and Mercedes-Benz took a 42.7 percent interest in MEVOSA.

== Mercedes-Benz N 1000/N 1300 ==
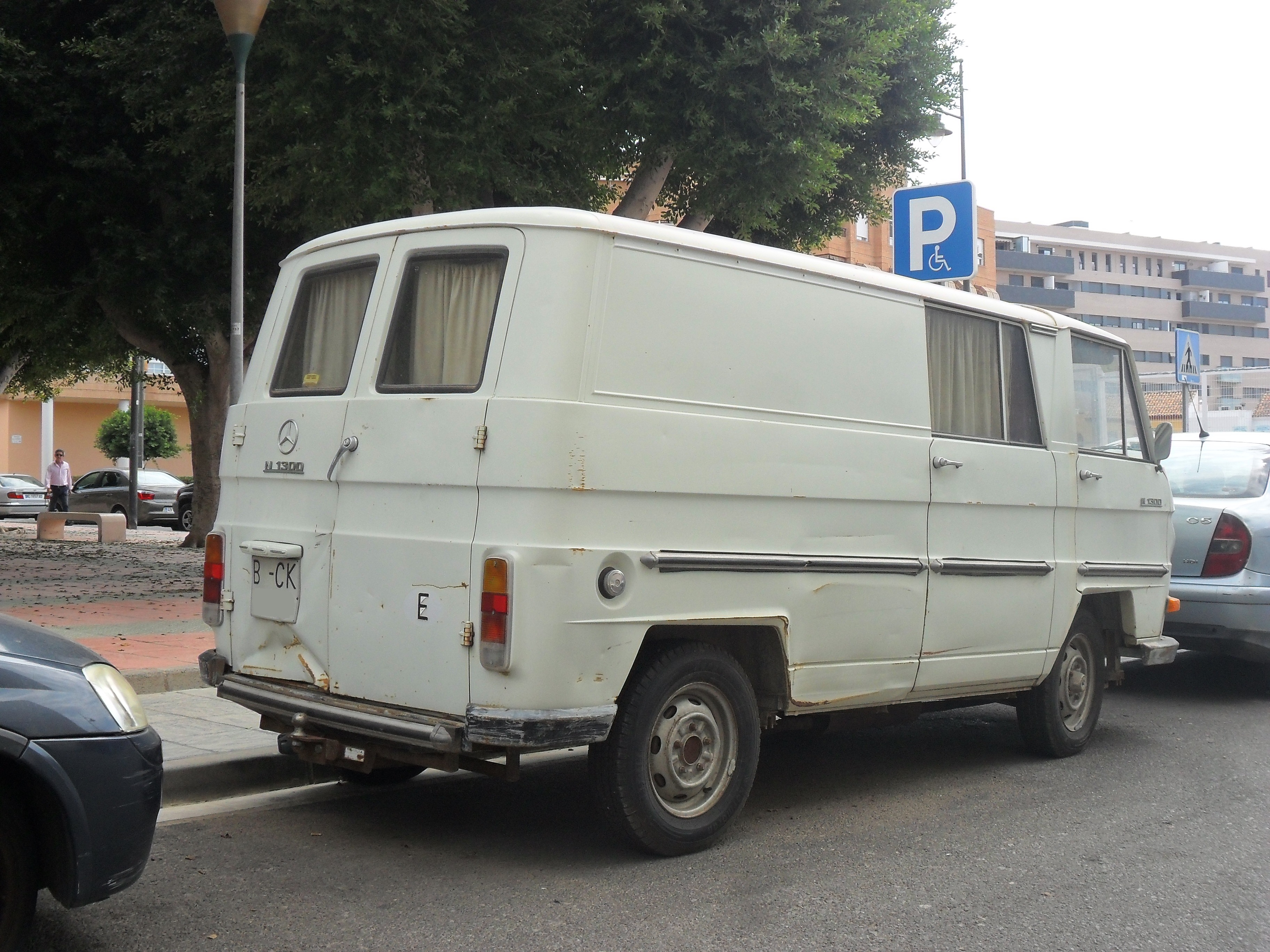
Rear view of Mercedes-Benz N 1300

Anticipating Volkswagen's absence, the F1000 was redesigned and renamed the Mercedes-Benz N 1000 in 1975. This was only available with the 1.8-liter diesel engine as the two-stroke had been discontinued earlier. The bodywork was modified at the front and rear, with a wider lower grille with the three-pointed star and new, larger, upright taillights similar to those used on the Volkswagen Type 2. The dashboard was redesigned, fully upholstered and with a new plastic steering wheel. The four-speed transmission was now fully synchronized, while the maximum power of the OM636 engine was increased to 47 PS (35 kW) at 3500 rpm.

From 1976 there was also the N 1300 with a 1,300 kg (2,866 lb) payload and the larger, 2-liter OM615 Mercedes-Benz diesel engine. In September 1980 the N 1300 was succeeded by the rebodied Mercedes-Benz MB100 and MB130, which later was to become the first vehicle in this series to be offered in Northern Europe.
