= SsangYong Istana =

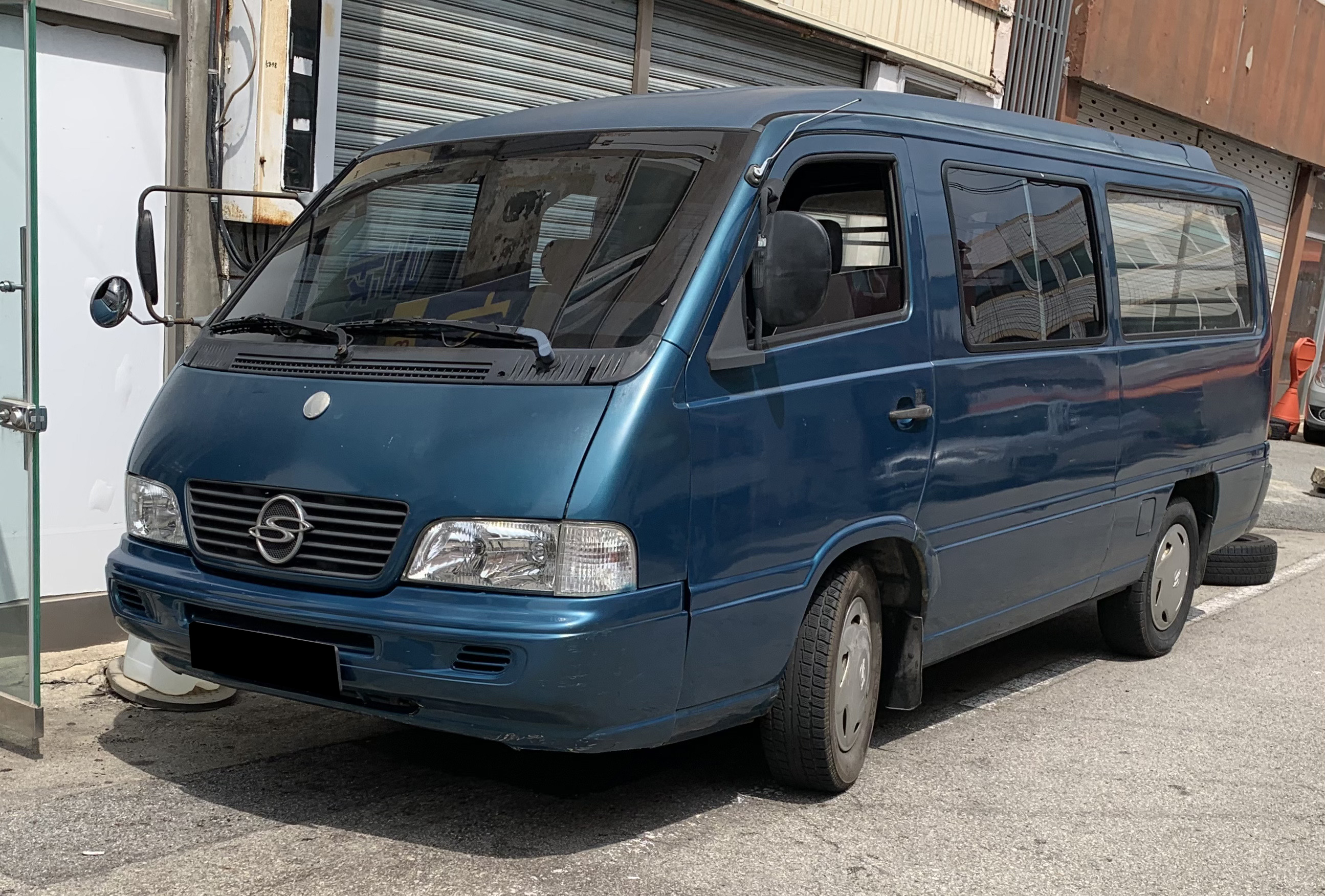

Overview
- Manufacturer: SsangYong
- Also called: Daewoo Istana; SHAC Istana (China); Maxus Istana (China); Mercedes-Benz MB 100/MB 140 (Asia)
- Production: 1995 – December 2003 (South Korea); 2004–2014 (China)
- Assembly: South Korea: Pyeongtaek

Body and chassis
- Class: Minivan
- Body style: 4-door van; 4-door minibus
- Layout: FF layout

Powertrain
- Engine: 2.9 L OM602 diesel I5
- Transmission: 5-speed manual

Chronology
- Successor: SsangYong Rodius/Stavic; Maxus G10 (China, for Maxus Istana)

The SsangYong Istana is a 2, 9, 12 and 15 seater minivan and minibus based on the Mercedes-Benz MB100 'Bus' variant. It comes with most of the options of the MB100 as well. The word Istana is a Malay word for Palace or Castle, which is the name of the presidential residences in both Singapore and Indonesia.

== Gallery ==
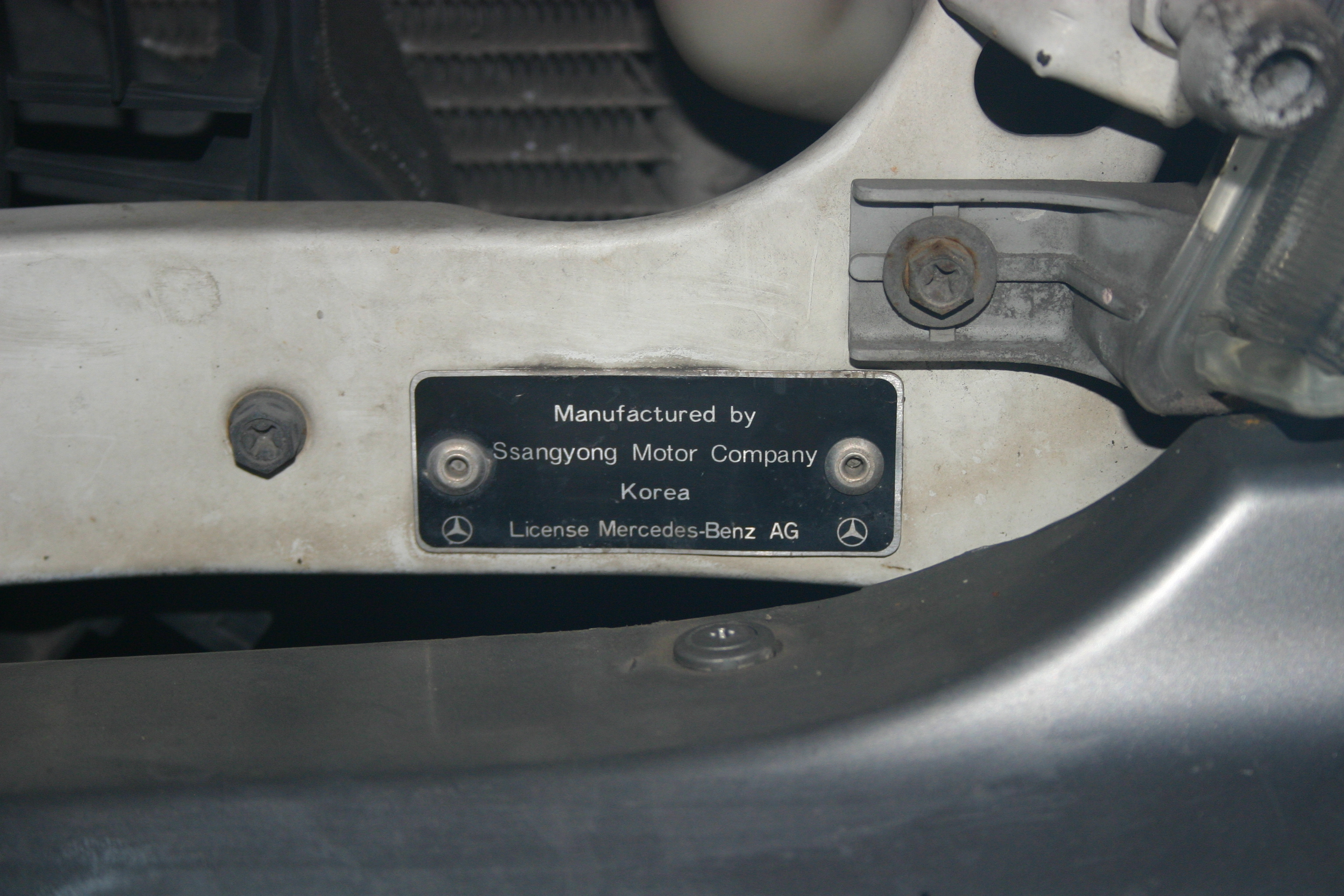
SsangYong Istana license badge

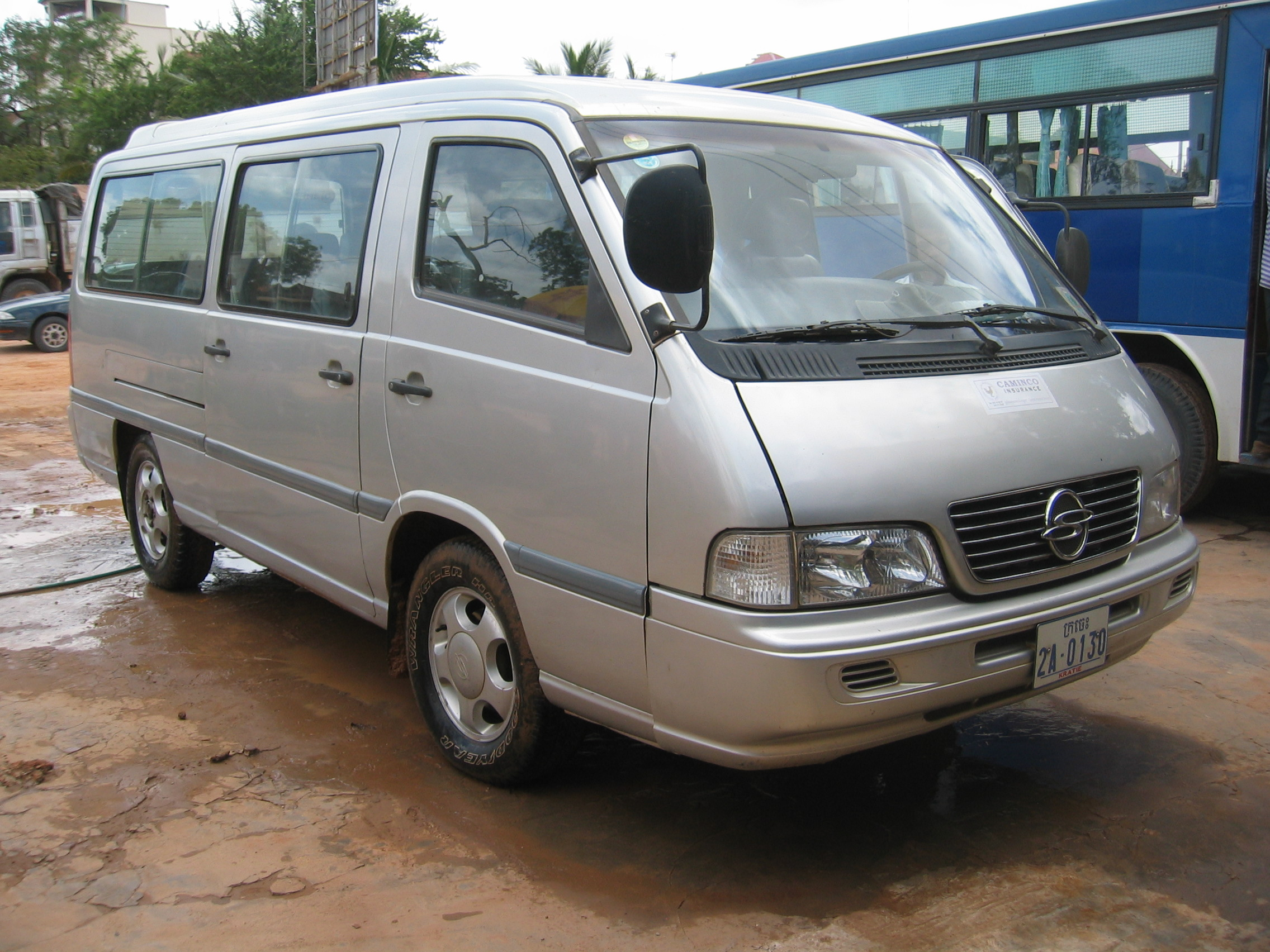
A SsangYong Istana in Cambodia 2008

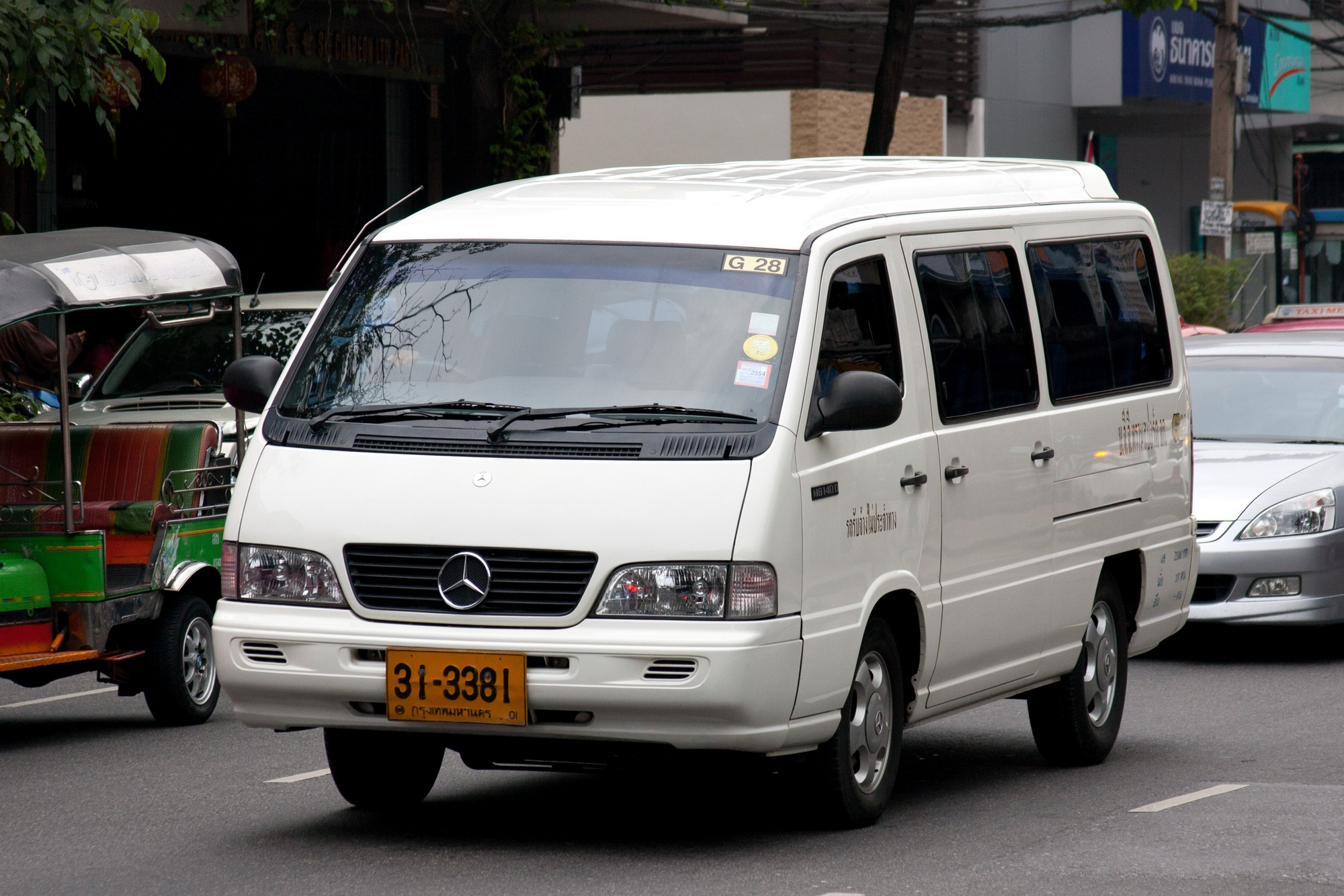
A Mercedes-Benz MB 140 D in Bangkok

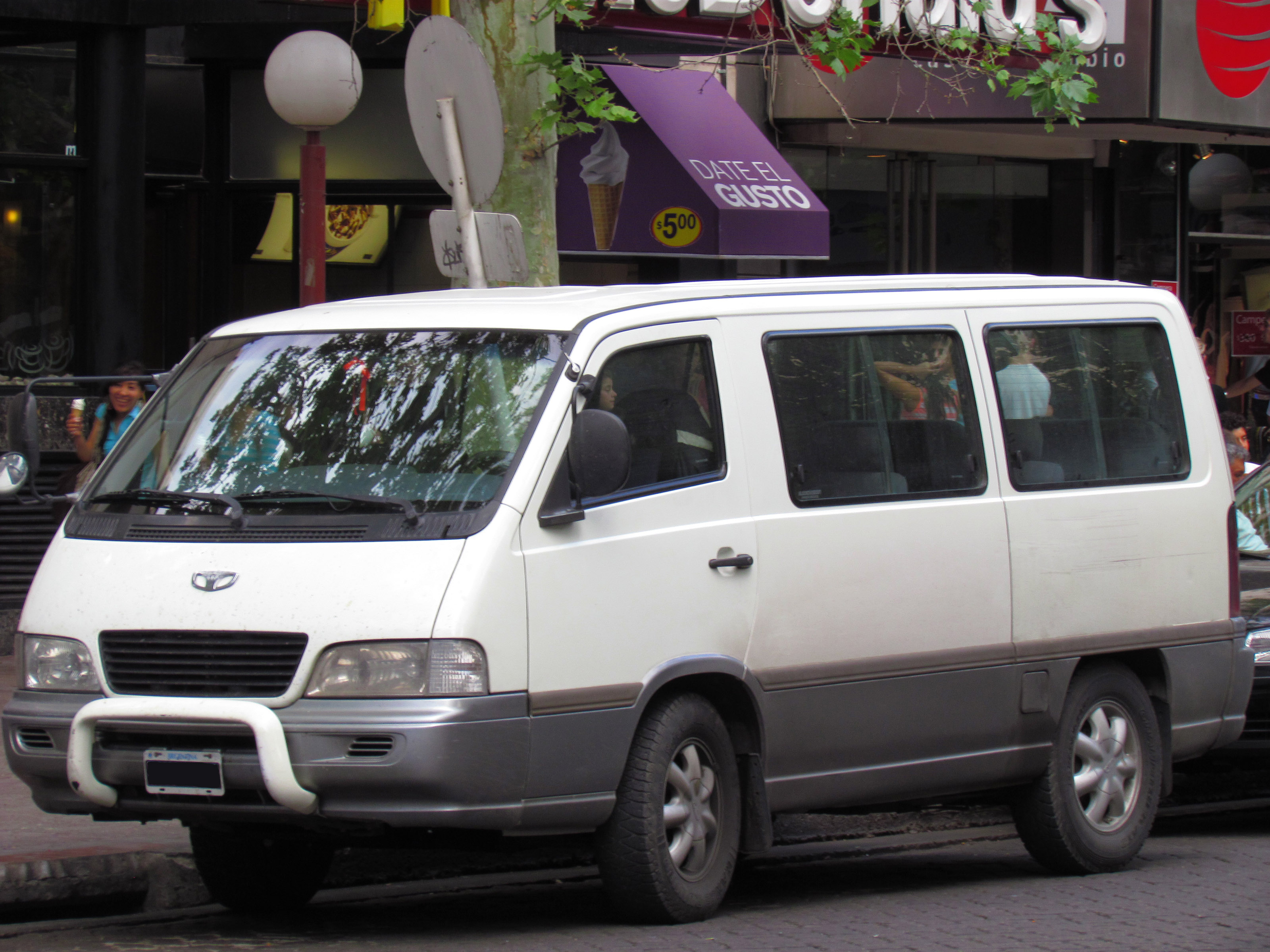
Daewoo Istana in Chile

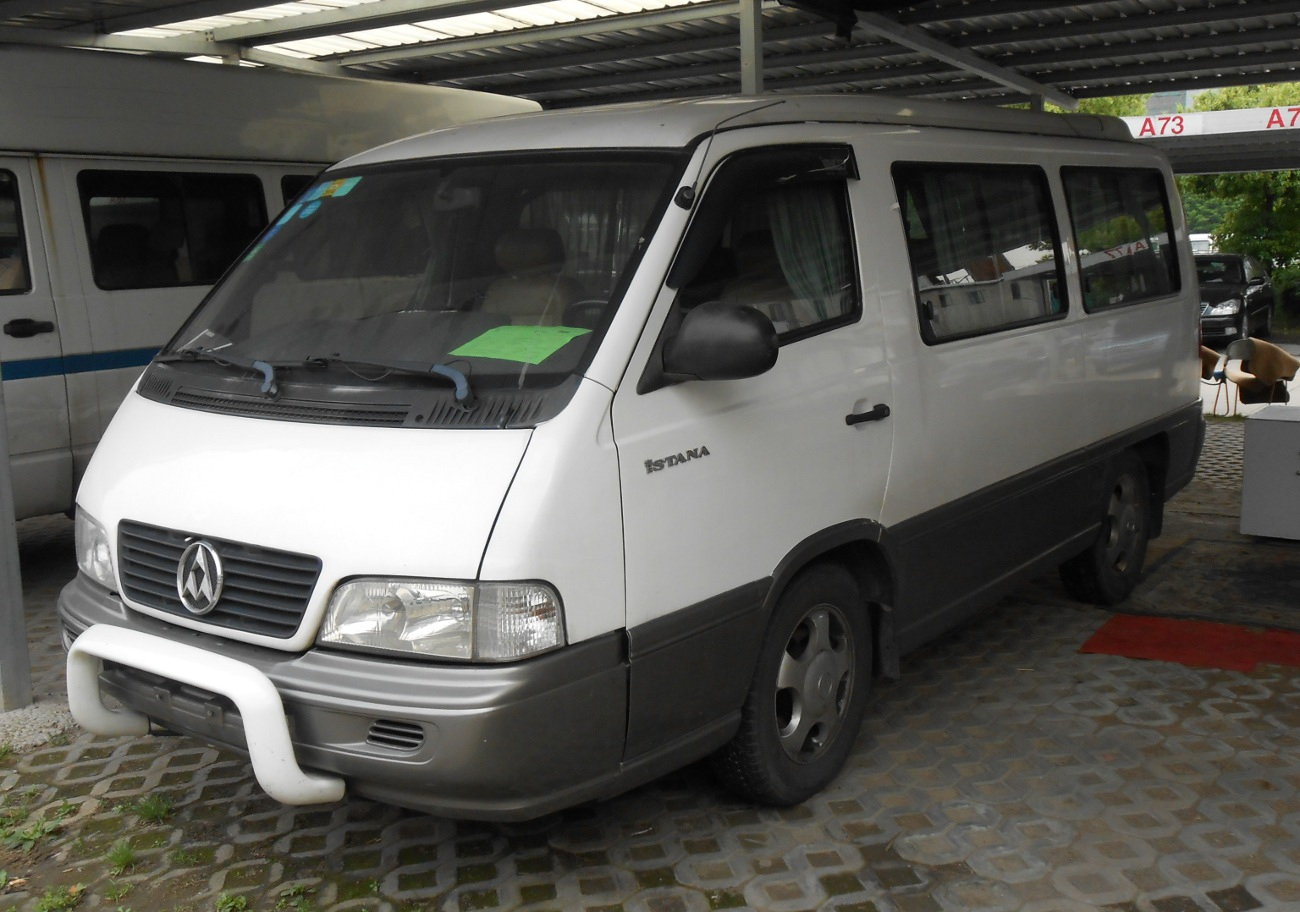
Maxus Istana
