= Biamax =

Defunct Greek vehicle manufacturer

- Industry: Automobile
- Founded: 1932; 94 years ago
- Founder: Fostiropoulos family
- Defunct: 1998; 28 years ago
- Fate: stopped bus production in 1986, and was partly acquired by Sfakianakis S.A. in 1998
- Successor: Sfakianakis S.A.
- Products: Buses
- Number of employees: 2,200

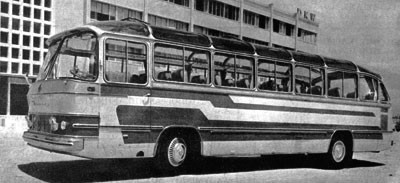
A technically advanced Biamax R514 (1960 model, chassiless)

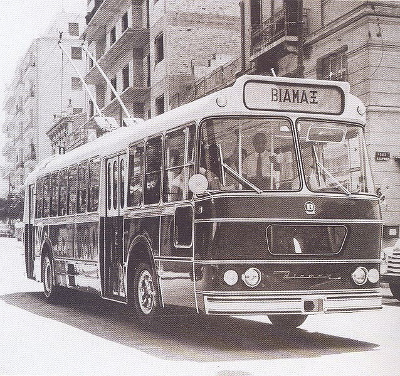
Also designed by Dracoulis: Biamax F600 trolleybus (1962 model)

An extremely rugged model produced specifically for Africa and the Middle East: Biamax Desert Bus (1964 model)

One of the most successful models: Biamax F580 (1966 model, ladder-type Biamax chassis)

BIAMAX (Proper Greek pronunciation Viamax) was a Greek vehicle manufacturer. In the late 70's it was one of the biggest Greek companies, operating three factories (in Athens, where its headquarters were located, Thessaloniki and Larissa) and several other auxiliary facilities throughout the country. In addition, BIAMAX became a leading industry in Greece, in areas including Quality Assurance, technical training, process documentation and Research & Development. Although its main activity was vehicle manufacture (in the late 1970s its industrial sector employed more than 2,000), some of its subsidiaries were also involved in areas like tourist services, exports of farm products and shipping.

== Early activities ==
Its origins date back to the 1930s when the Fostiropoulos family became importers of Mercedes-Benz vehicles. The company with that name was founded in 1956, the name reflecting its original activity, as it started with production of bus bodies on Mercedes-Benz chassis (BIAMAX, stands for "Biomihania Amaxomaton", or "Vehicle Body Building Industry"; the name was retained although the company soon became a complete vehicle producer).

== Original developments ==
The first chassis developed by BIAMAX was introduced in January, 1960. In the same year the famous R series of coaches and inter-city buses was introduced. One of the earliest chassisless bus designs in the world, it was an engineering achievement involving novel approaches in suspension and structure, developed by the engineers Antonios Rizos (who lent his name initial to the series) and Ioannis Dracoulis (who was responsible for its extremely elegant, streamlined design). Models R495 (inter-city bus) and R514 (coach) became common sights in the country, establishing the BIAMAX brand. In 1962 a trolleybus type (also chassisless) was designed and built, with Lancia axles and transmission and CGE electricals; as an imported type was ordered for Athens, only one trolleybus was produced but it nonetheless entered service remaining in operation for more than 15 years.

== 1960s and 1970s: The "Golden Age" ==
The very successful F series of city and inter-city buses (named after Fostiropoulos initial, a designation used earlier as well) was introduced in 1965 employing a ladder-type chassis developed by BIAMAX, and, as most of its products, Mercedes-Benz engines. The most common types produced were the F530 and F580, with several body variations for a variety of end uses. At the same time BIAMAX introduced railway wagons, and kept producing an extended range of bus and truck bodies, assembling 4x4's and tractors etc., with thousands of vehicles coming out of its factories, many of which were exported to a large number of countries, mainly in Europe, Asia and Africa; at times the company exported as much as 50% of its production. One of the most notable models specifically developed for Africa and the Middle East was the "Desert Bus", an extremely rugged construction whose production started in 1963, for long-distance travel with cross-country and extra load capabilities (including the capability to carry tons of load on its roof), optionally with A/C, beds, toilets etc. F580 types can be seen to this date working hard in the Middle East. Indeed, the legendary reliability of BIAMAX buses can be testified by the large number of surviving examples, most of them in excellent working condition. One of the most successful ventures of Biamax was the production of Mercedes-Benz O302 and O303 coaches, including variants like the O302S2 type, which essentially was a "blend" of both models.

== Evolutions after 1980 ==
The company faced difficulties in the early 1980s when some Middle Eastern markets were lost but, mostly, due to the new laws allowing import of used buses in Greece. The entry of Greece to the European Communities canceled the Greek "protectionist" laws for the local automobile industry and the duties for importing foreign vehicles.

In 1986 it ceased production, focusing on vehicle import and distribution. Since 1999, after an attempt by Sfakianakis S.A. to acquire the company was not completed (Sfakianakis acquired only the truck and tractor importing division), all trading activity ceased as well; former parts of the company have focused on shipping and other activities and what is left of BIAMAX operates to date as a real estate management firm.

The old industry facilities on Athinon Avenue remain abandoned.
