= FAP 1118 =

Serbian 4×4 military truck family

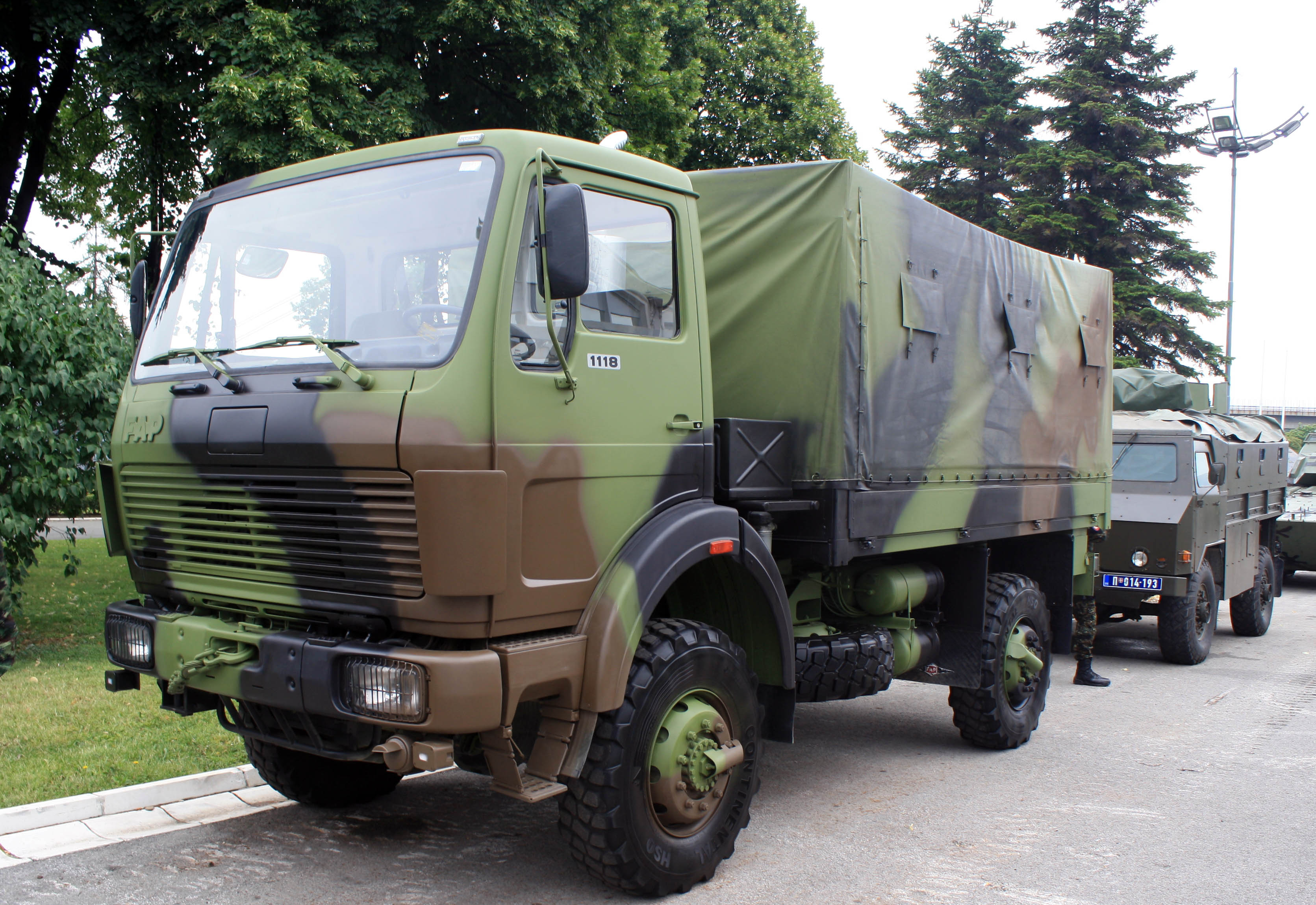

Overview
- Manufacturer: FAP
- Production: 2010–present
- Assembly: Priboj, Serbia

Body and chassis
- Class: Medium truck
- Body style: COE

Powertrain
- Engine: Mercedes-Benz OM904 engine
- Transmission: FAP 6MS 60-P 98

Dimensions
- Wheelbase: 3,600 mm (141.7 in)
- Length: 6,400 mm (252.0 in)
- Width: 2,500 mm (98.4 in)
- Height: 3,200 mm (126.0 in)
- Curb weight: 7,400 kg (16,314 lb)

Chronology
- Predecessor: FAP 1117

The FAP 1118 is a series of 4×4 military trucks manufactured by Fabrika automobila Priboj (FAP) based on the Mercedes-Benz NG series. The FAP 1118 is intended to replace the TAM 110 series of military trucks in the Serbian Armed Forces.

== Description ==
Designed for towing trailers, artillery pieces and transporting personnel, weapons and materials weighing up to 4 gross weight tonnes, the FAP 1118 is a military vehicle equipped with a powerful Mercedes Benz four cylinder engine, all-wheel drive, and differentials that can all be locked. The FAP 1118 is a very capable vehicle as it is able to navigate 60% cross-country gradients. The FAP 1118’s thought out body geometry ensures that it can smoothly navigate natural as well as man-made obstacles such as trenches, railway embankments and escarpments. The FAP 1118 is also capable of central tire pressure regulation, giving it a high level of mobility over soft soil.

The prototype for the FAP 1118 has already been completed and tested. A trial run is scheduled to take place by at the end of this year.. Several variants of the FAP 1118 currently exist as it is used for various applications. A few notable examples are the Sanijet NBC the LRSVM Morava.

Technical specifications

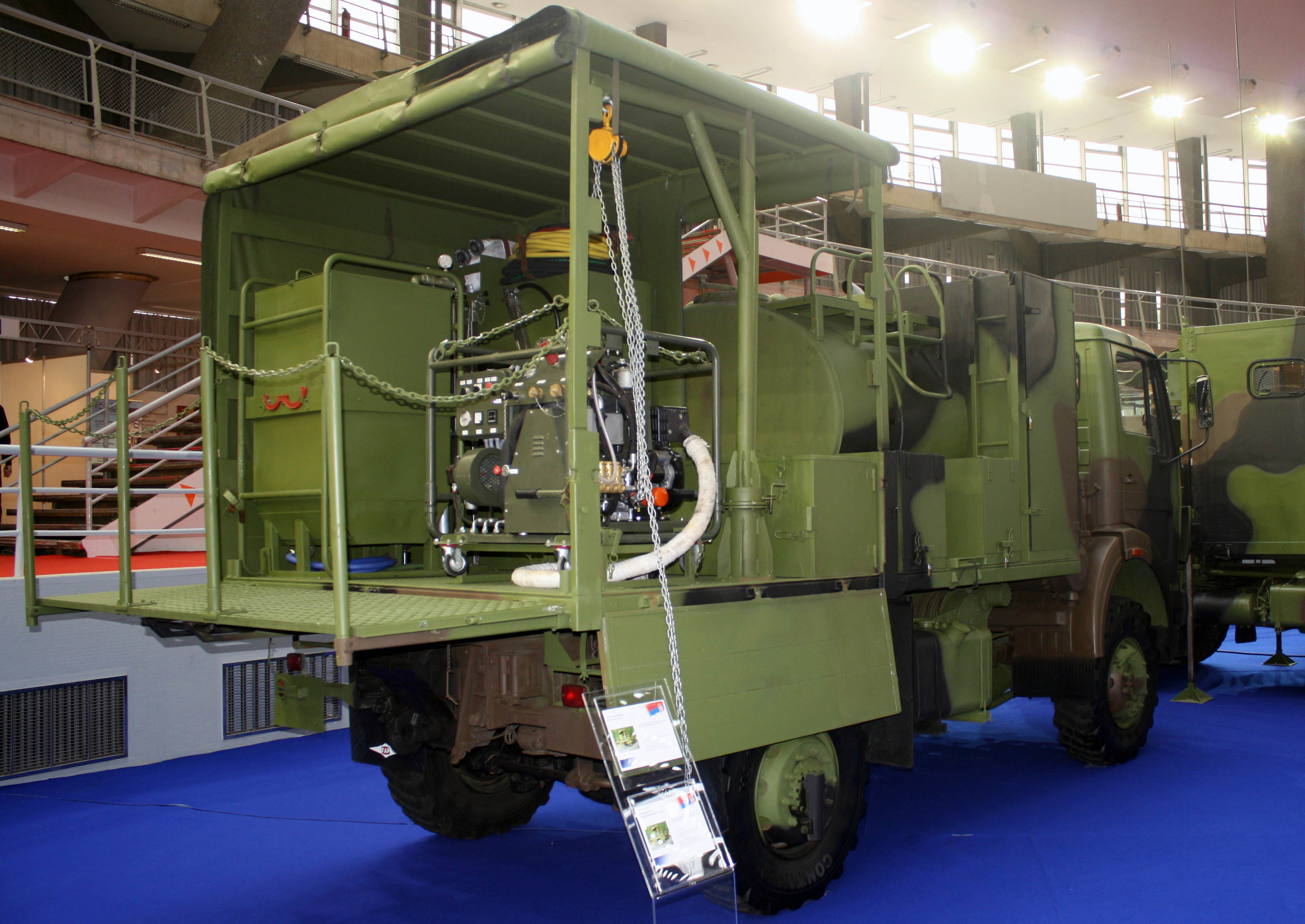
FAP 1118 CBRN sanitation truck

1118 BS/36 4x4

- Gross vehicle mass: 11,000 kg
- Front axle permissible mass: 5200 kg
- Rear axle permissible mass: 5800 kg
- Payload: 4000 kg
- Engine type: Mercedes-Benz OM 904 LA, EU3
- Configuration: Straight-four diesel engine
- Bore/stroke: 102/130 mm
- Displacement: 4.25 dm^{3}
- Rated power: 130 kW at 2200 min^{−1}
- Peak torque: 675 N·m at 1200-1600 min^{−1}
- Electrical system: 24 V
- Clutch: GF 380
- Gearbox: FAP 6MS 60-P 98
- Front axle: AL 3/1 DS
- Rear axle: HL4/36 DS- 9.2
- Steering system: PPT 8042
- Length × width × height: 4000 × 2430 × 1700 mm
- Wheel size: 9,00 - 22,5″
- Tyre size: 13R 22,5″ HSO MIL
- Fuel tank capacity: 200 l
- Max. speed: 80 km/h
- Max. grading: 60 %
