= Mercedes-Benz O404 =

Step-entrance complete coach or coach chassis

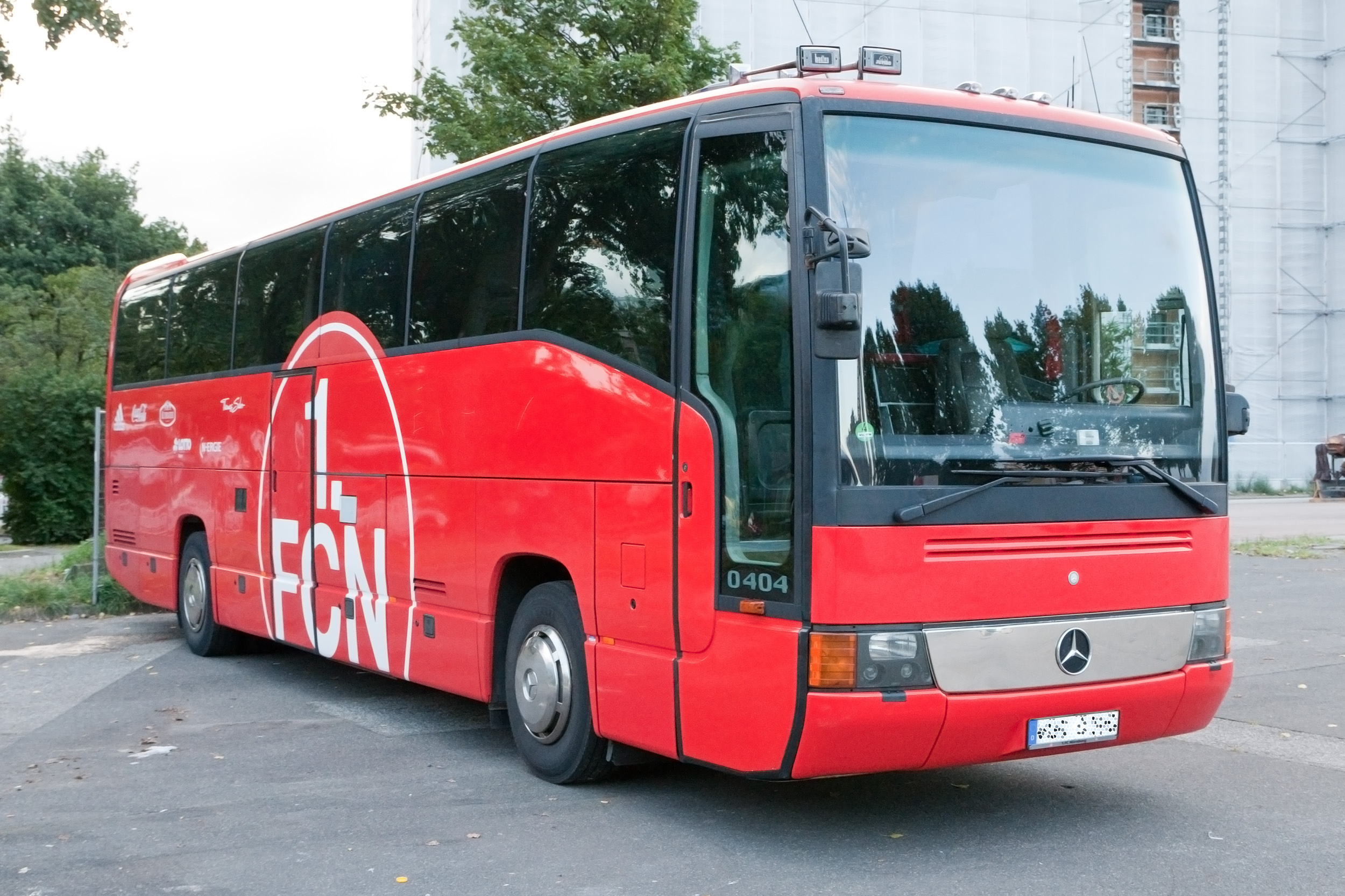
- Mercedes-Benz O404-15RHD, the team coach for 1. FC Nürnberg, in Hamburg in August 2012

Overview
- Manufacturer: Mercedes-Benz
- Production: 1992-1999
- Assembly: Mannheim, Baden-Württemberg, Germany

Body and chassis
- Doors: 1-2
- Floor type: Step entrance
- Related: FAP Sanos 404

Powertrain
- Engine: Mercedes-Benz V6; Mercedes-Benz V8
- Power output: 205–503 horsepower (153–375 kW)
- Transmission: Mercedes-Benz six-speed manual

Dimensions
- Length: 9.2 m (30 ft); 10.7 m (35 ft); 12.0 m (39.4 ft)
- Height: RH: 3.3 m (11 ft); RHD: 3.5 m (11 ft); SHD: 3.75 m (12.3 ft)

Chronology
- Predecessor: Mercedes-Benz O303
- Successor: Mercedes-Benz Travego; Mercedes-Benz OC500RF (chassis)

The Mercedes-Benz O404 is both a complete coach and a coach chassis manufactured by Mercedes-Benz between 1992 and 1999.

== History ==
The Mercedes-Benz O404 was launched in July 1991 as a replacement for the O303, which at the time was the most sold coach in the world after 35,000 examples had been produced. Also being offered a chassis with two and three axles at launch, as a complete coach, the new O404 was configurable both in three lengths (9.2 metres (30 ft), 10.7 metres (35 ft) and 12.0 metres (39.4 ft)) and three different heights ranging between 3.3 metres (11 ft), 3.5 metres (11 ft) and 3.75 metres (12.3 ft) to suit multiple operating roles.

The complete coach marked a significant redesign when compared to the O303, employing a rounded exterior with sculpted side panels more suitable for recycling at the end of a coach's service life, and also featured air-operated disc brakes, a multi-link suspension, and new heating and air conditioning systems. The coach was also offered in full-size double-decker coach configuration, however only one prototype was produced to limited operator interest.

At the European Bus and Coach Show in Kortrijk in October 1991, the O404 was awarded the title of 1992's 'Coach of the Year' by a jury of twelve transport journalists from various European countries.

The O404 was eventually superseded by the Mercedes-Benz OC500RF as a chassis, known in Australia as the Mercedes-Benz O500RF, and the Mercedes-Benz Travego as a complete coach in 1999.

== Operators ==
Israeli bus operator Egged was the first corporation to use the O404 to carry passengers, as opposed to tours operation.
