= Mercedes-Benz Travego =

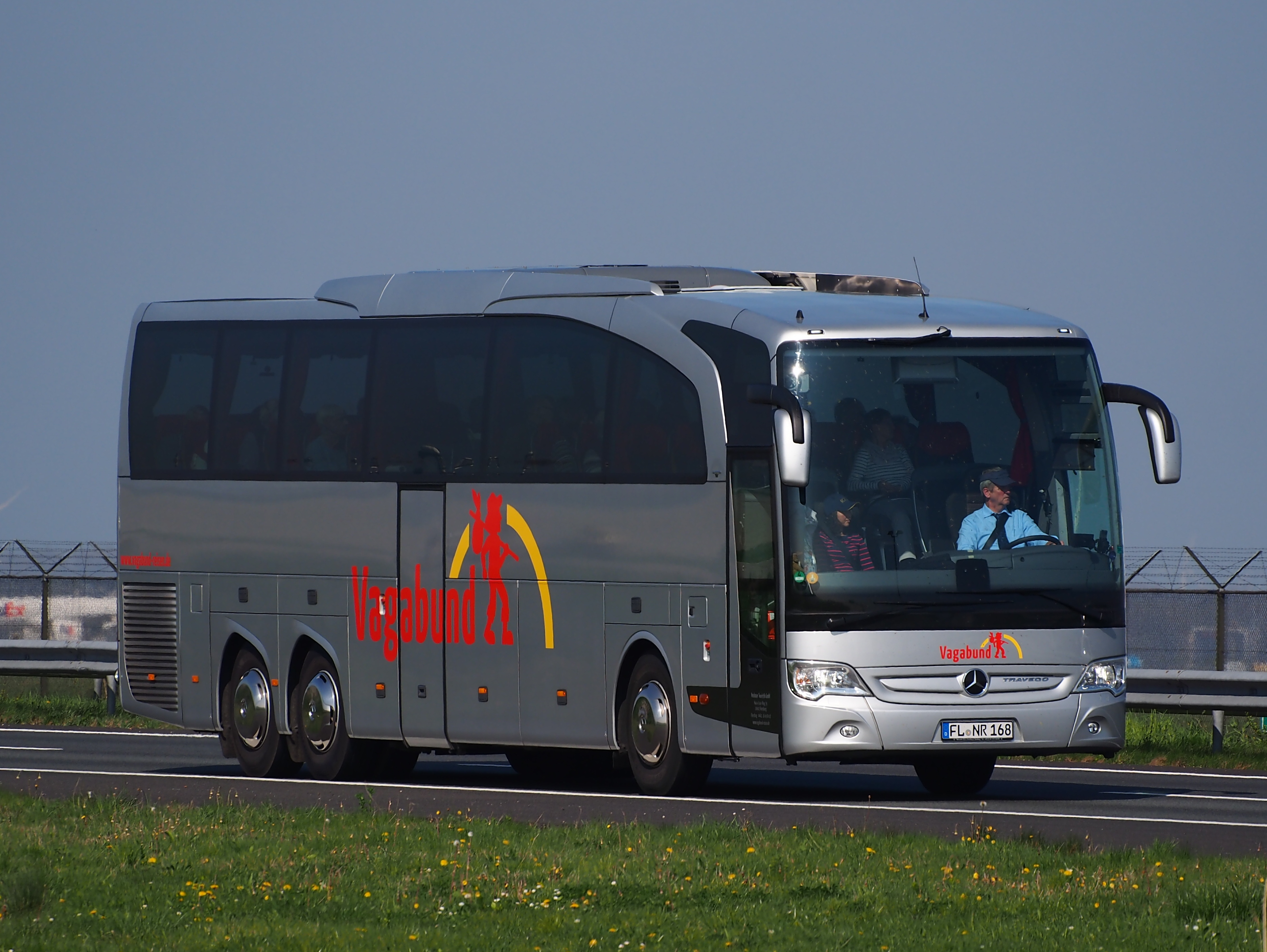
- Travego M 2nd generation facelift

Overview
- Manufacturer: Mercedes-Benz
- Production: 1999-present
- Assembly: Germany: Neu-Ulm; Germany: Mannheim; Turkey: Istanbul

Body and chassis
- Class: Coach bus
- Doors: 2
- Floor type: High floor

Powertrain
- Engine: OM 470 or OM 471 12.8 liter 6-cylinder in-line diesel engine (Euro VI)
- Capacity: 44-57 seats
- Power output: 315 kW (422 hp) or 350 kW (470 hp)
- Transmission: Mercedes-Benz GO 210, 6-speed manual, power-assisted Mercedes-Benz GO 250 MPS 3, automated 8-speed manual

Dimensions
- Length: Travego: 12,180 mm; Travego M: 13,000 mm; Travego L: 14,030 mm
- Width: 2,550 mm
- Height: 3,710 mm
- Curb weight: 19,500 - 24,000 kg

Chronology
- Predecessor: Mercedes-Benz O404
- Successor: Mercedes-Benz Tourismo

The Mercedes-Benz Travego (also known as O580) is an integral coach produced since 1999 by Daimler/EvoBus in Neu-Ulm and Mannheim in Germany and since 2005 at Mercedes-Benz bus plant in Hoşdere, Istanbul, Turkey. It succeeded the O404 and was originally introduced as the flagship of Mercedes-Benz touring coach range.

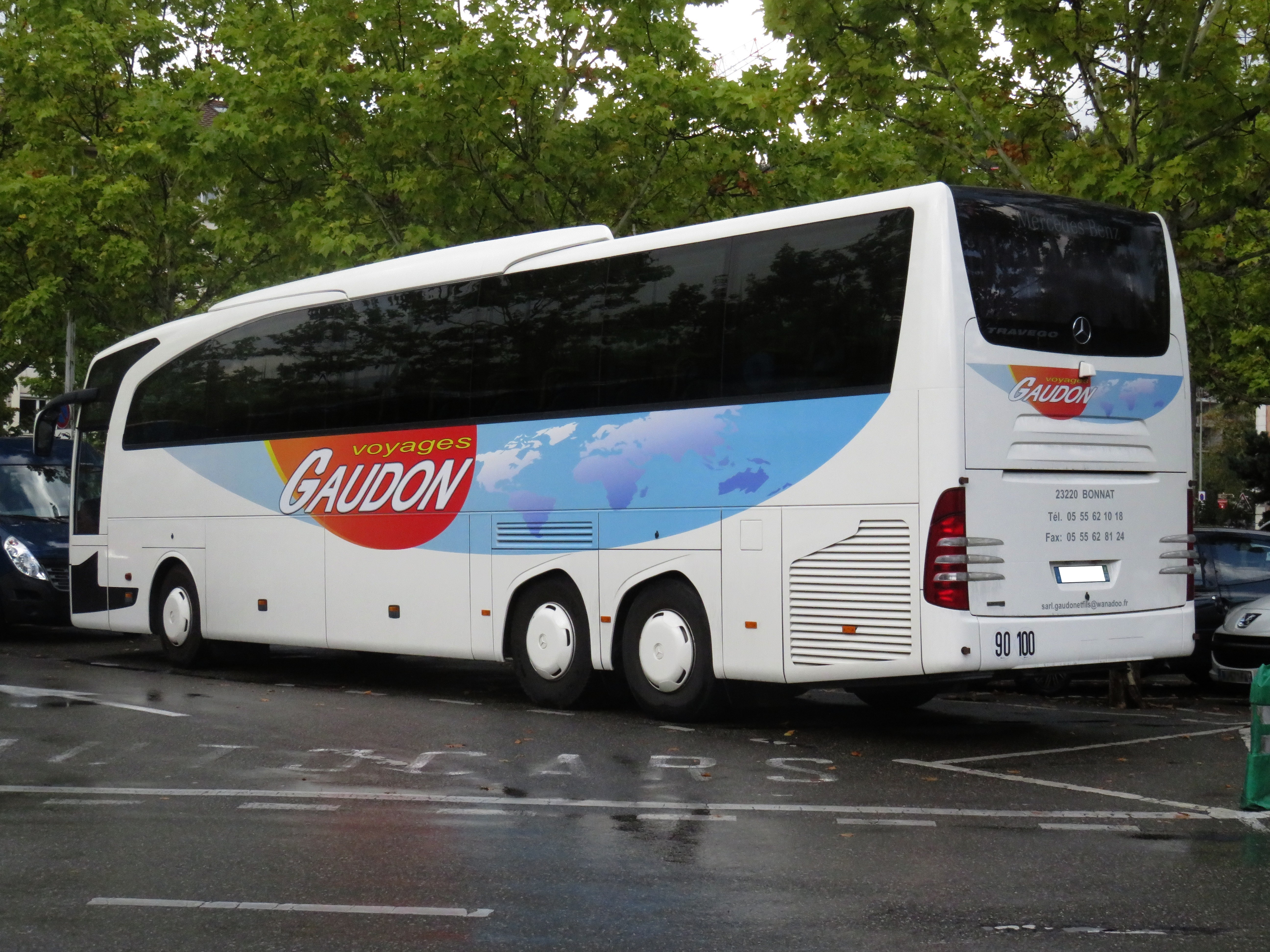
Rear view (Euro V)

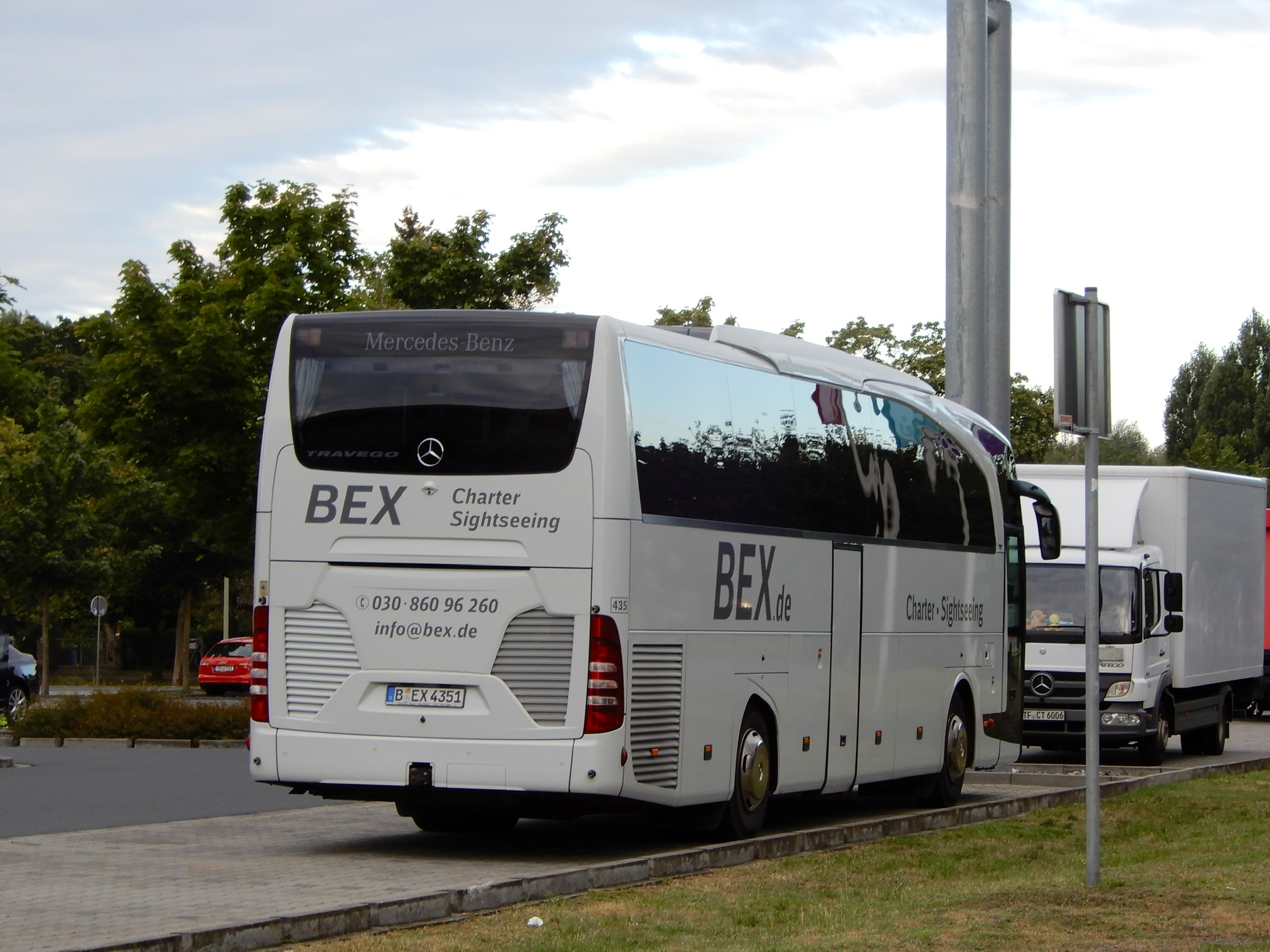
Rear view (Euro VI)

== First generation - 1999-2006 ==
In year 1999, the O580 Travego 1st generation with all new exterior design succeeded the O404 in the segment of luxury touring coach flagship. It shares many of its components with Setra 400 TopClass Series. Three lengths were available for sale: O580-15 RHD with 2 axles in 12.2m, O580-16 RHD with 3 axles in 13m and O580-17 RHD in 14m. The 12m version was also available as O580-15 RH with lowered floor. Technical novelties include: All new driver seat with a joystick for shifting instead of traditional gearshift lever. One year after its introduction, the Travego received new assistance systems such as Adaptive Cruise Control (ART), Lane Assist (SPA), Continuous Brake Limiter (DBL), and Electronic Stability Program (ESP), which were available either as standard or as optional equipment.

== Third generation - 2017-present ==
The third generation of Travego was launched in 2017. Unlike previous generations, it is available only in Turkey, where this model is produced. Elsewhere, Travego was replaced by third generation of Mercedes-Benz Tourismo.

== Gallery ==
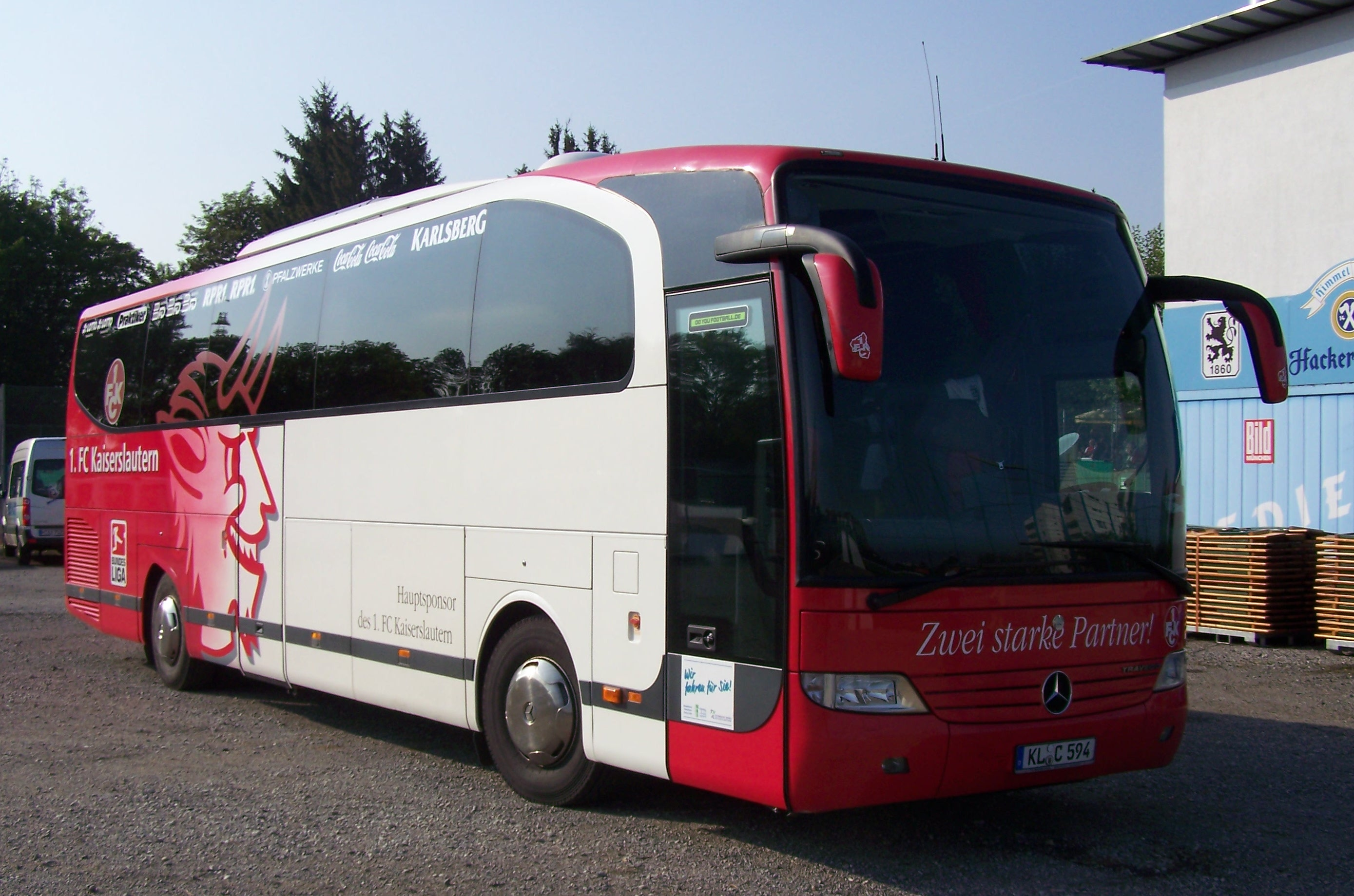
O580 Travego 15 RHD 1st generation

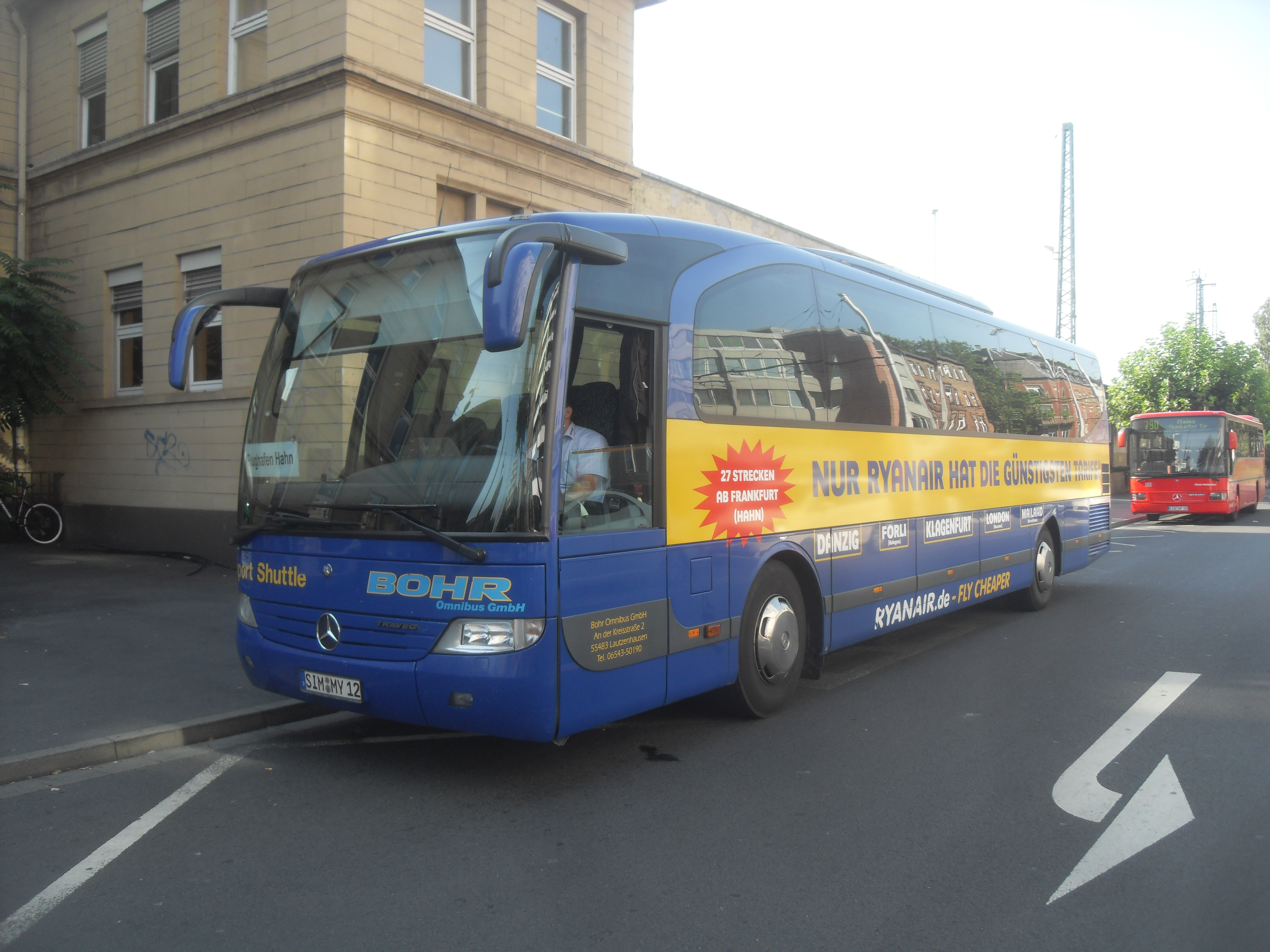
O580 Travego 15 RH

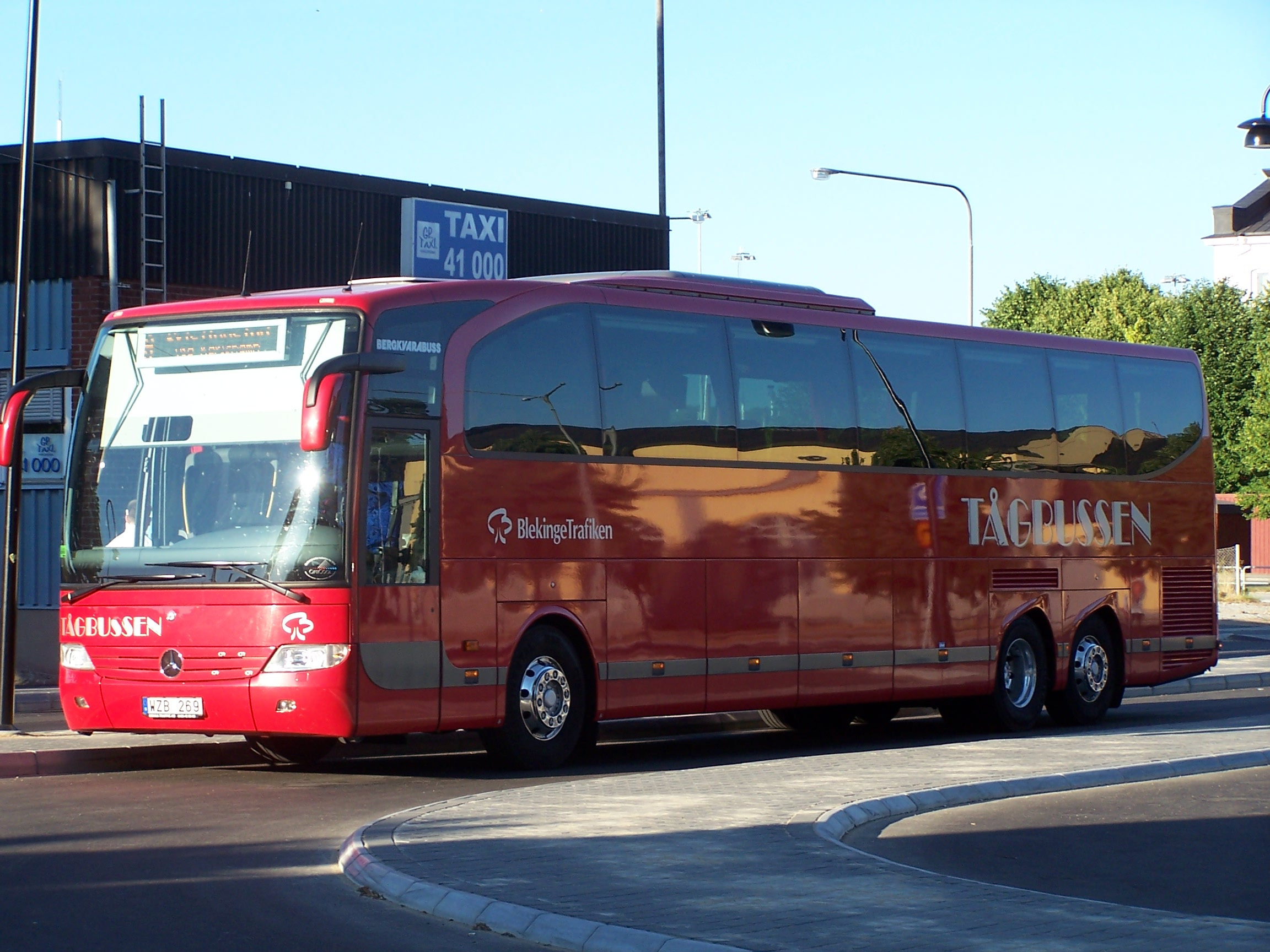
O580 Travego 17 RHD 1st generation

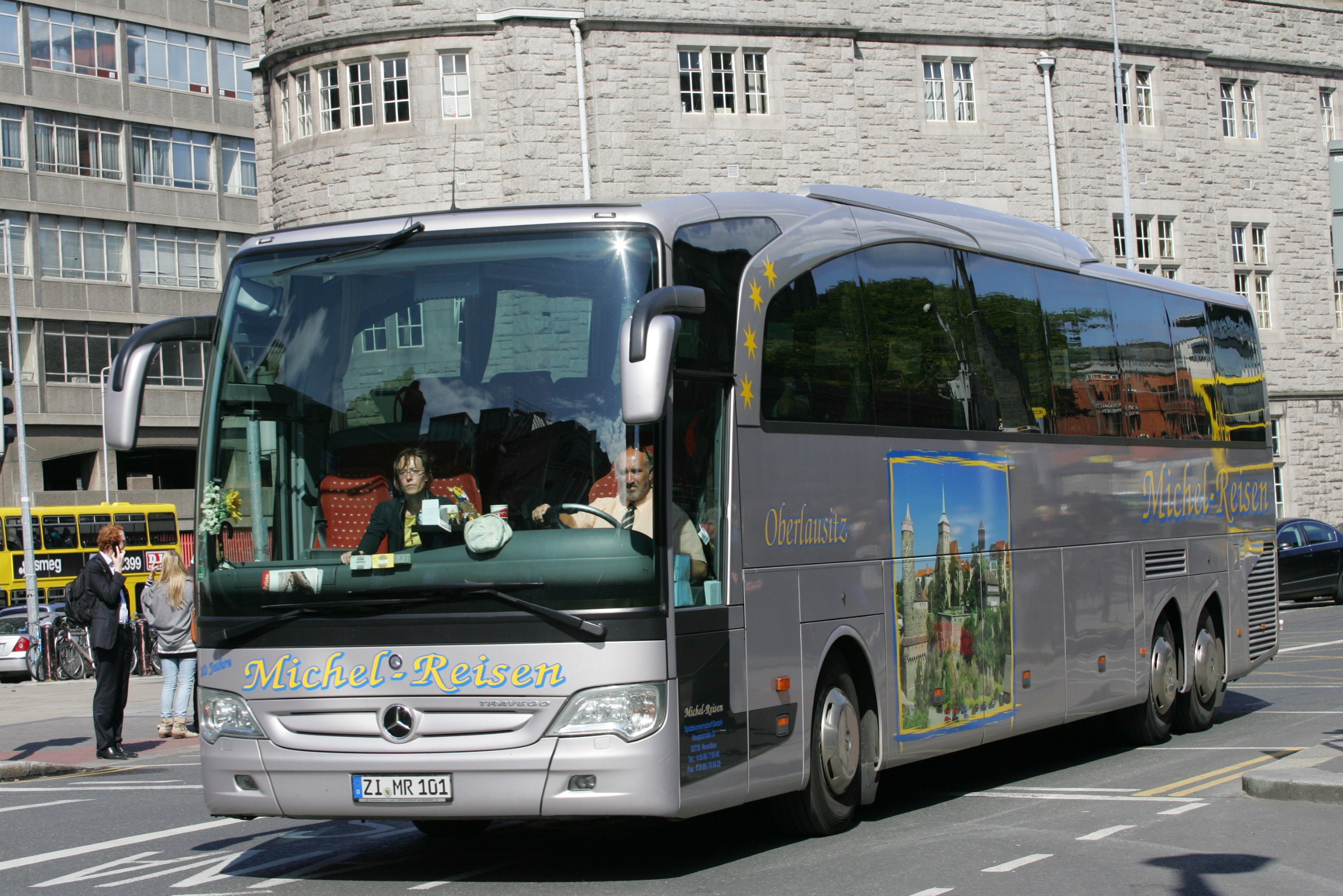
Travego L 2nd generation

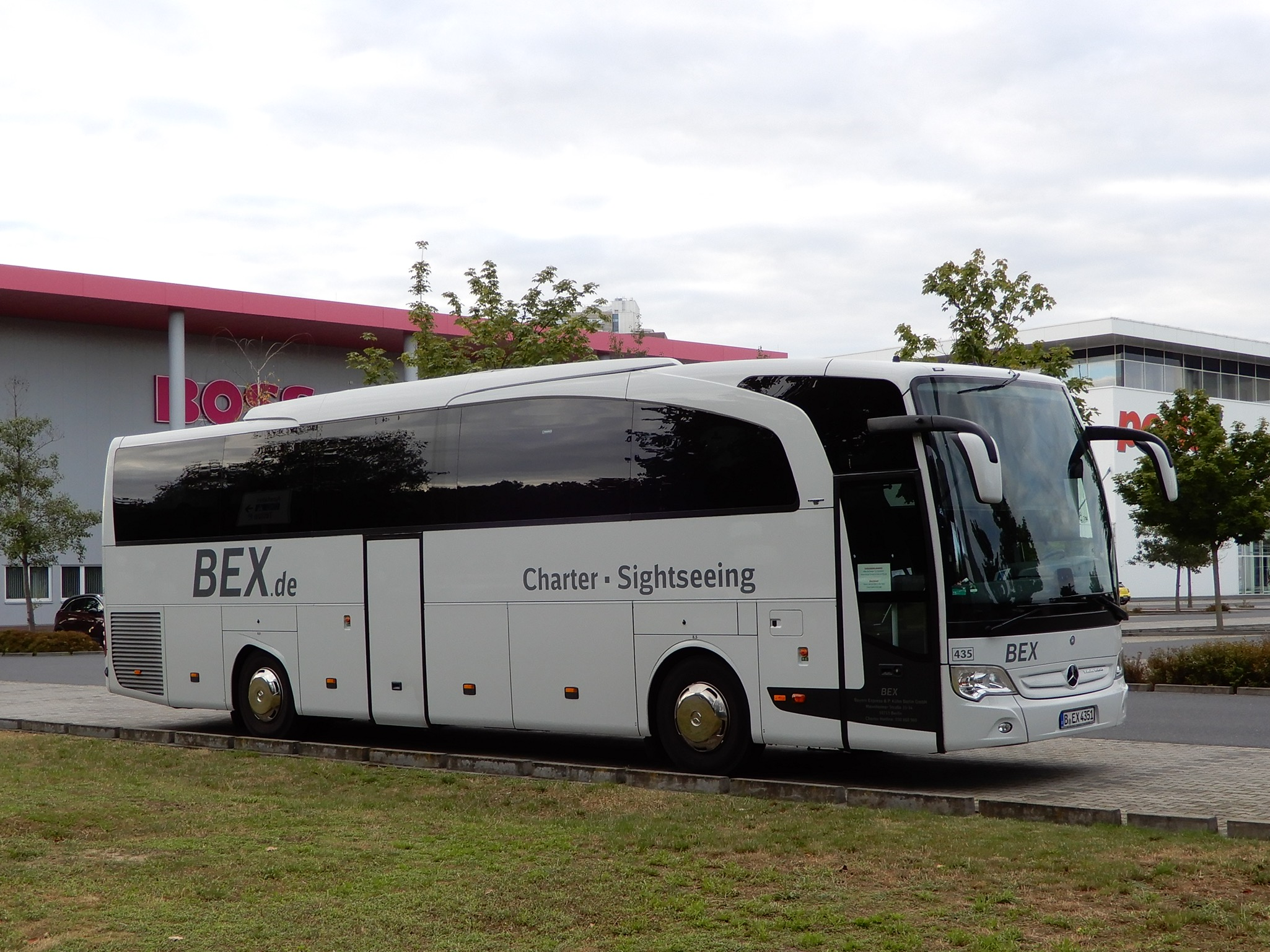
Travego 2nd generation facelift (Euro VI)

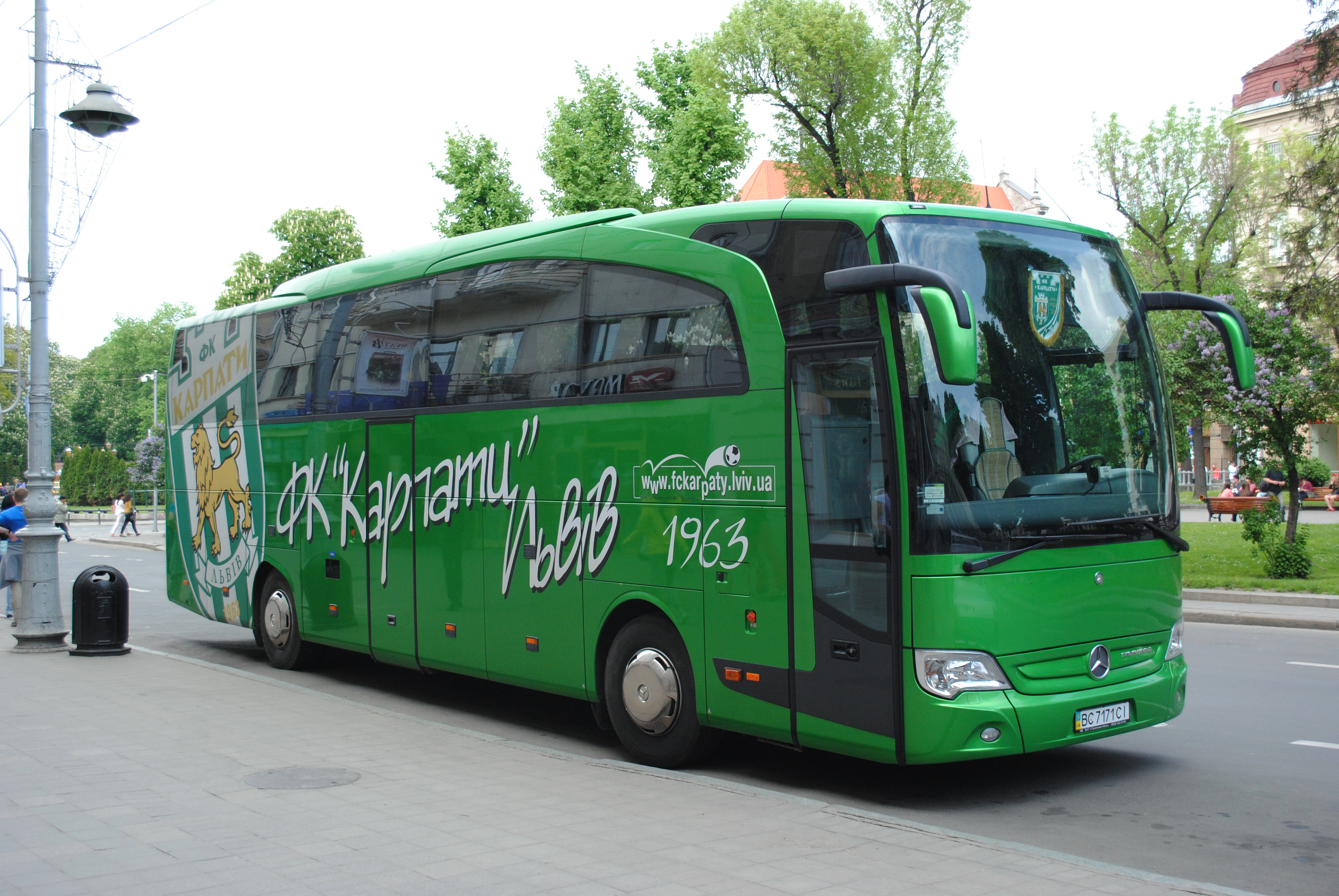
Travego 15 SHD 2nd generation facelift

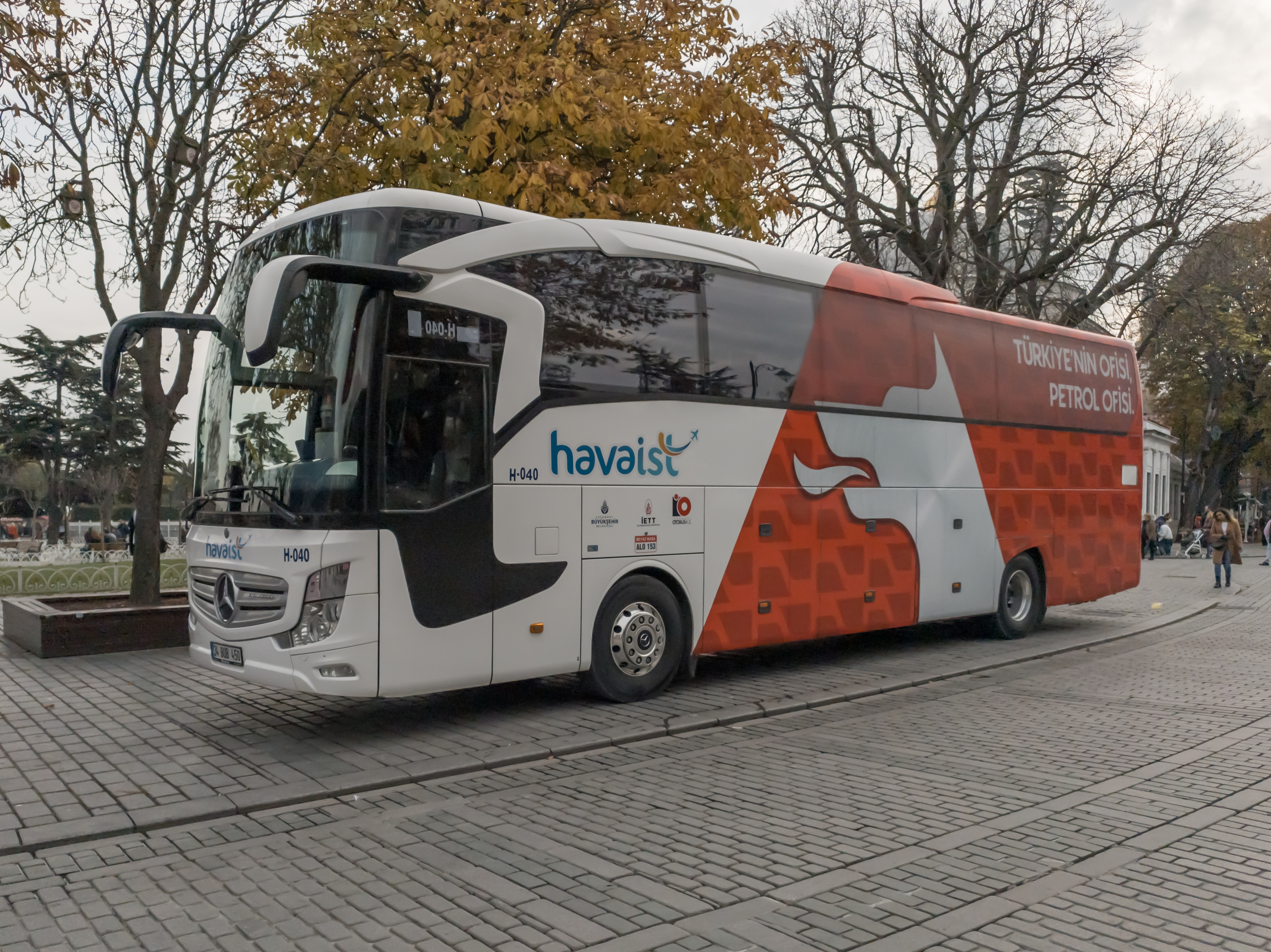
Travego 16 SHD 3rd generation
