= Mercedes-Benz O303 =

Step-entrance coach and coach chassis

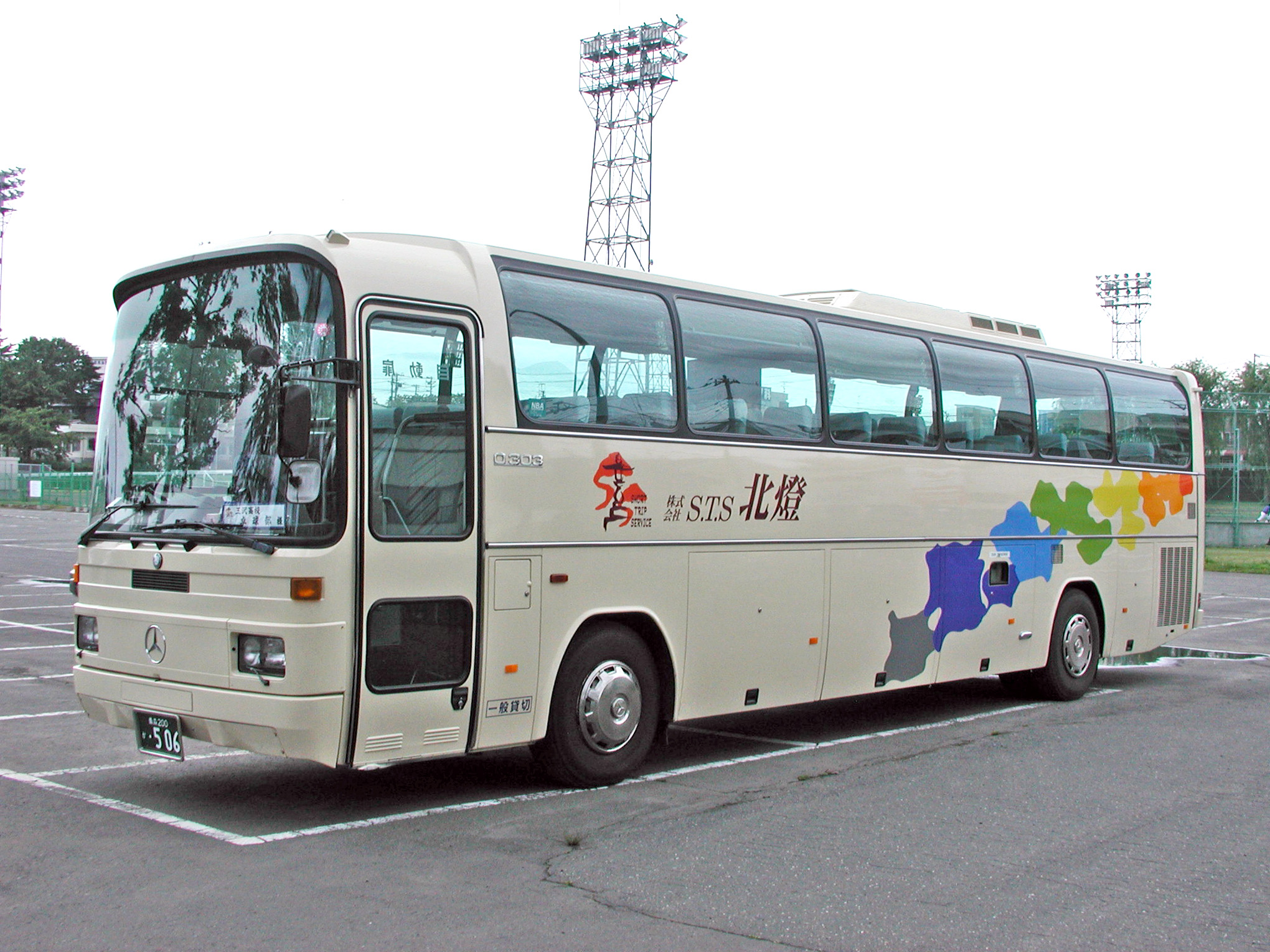
- Mercedes-Benz O303-15 RHD

Overview
- Manufacturer: Mercedes-Benz
- Production: 1974–1992; 1976–1978 (Hyundai, South Korea); 1977–1988 (Tvornica Autobusa Zagreb and 11. oktomvri Skopje, Yugoslavia); 1987–1992 (OTOMARSAN, Turkey)

Body and chassis
- Doors: 1–2
- Floor type: Step entrance
- Related: FAP Sanos 315

Powertrain
- Engine: Mercedes-Benz OM 401; Mercedes-Benz OM 402; Mercedes-Benz OM 403; Mercedes-Benz OM 422
- Transmission: 6-speed Manual or 4-speed automatic

Dimensions
- Length: O303-9: 8,678 mm (28.5 ft); O303-10: 9,237 mm (30.3 ft); O303-11: 9,993 mm (32.8 ft); O303-12: 10,173 mm (33.4 ft); O303-13: 10,556 mm (34.6 ft); O303-14: 11,293 mm (37.1 ft); O303-15: 12,000 mm (39.4 ft)
- Width: 2,500 mm (8.2 ft)
- Height: RHP/ÜHP/ÜHE or KHP-A/KHP-L: 3,061 mm (10.0 ft); RHH/ÜHH/RHS: 3,161 mm (10.4 ft); RHD: 3,421 mm (11.2 ft)

Chronology
- Predecessor: Mercedes-Benz O302
- Successor: Mercedes-Benz O404

The Mercedes-Benz O303 is an integral coach manufactured by Mercedes-Benz between 1974 and 1992. It was also available as a chassis, where the customer could choose to get the lower part of the front or even the entire front including the windscreen from the integral model shipped with the chassis.

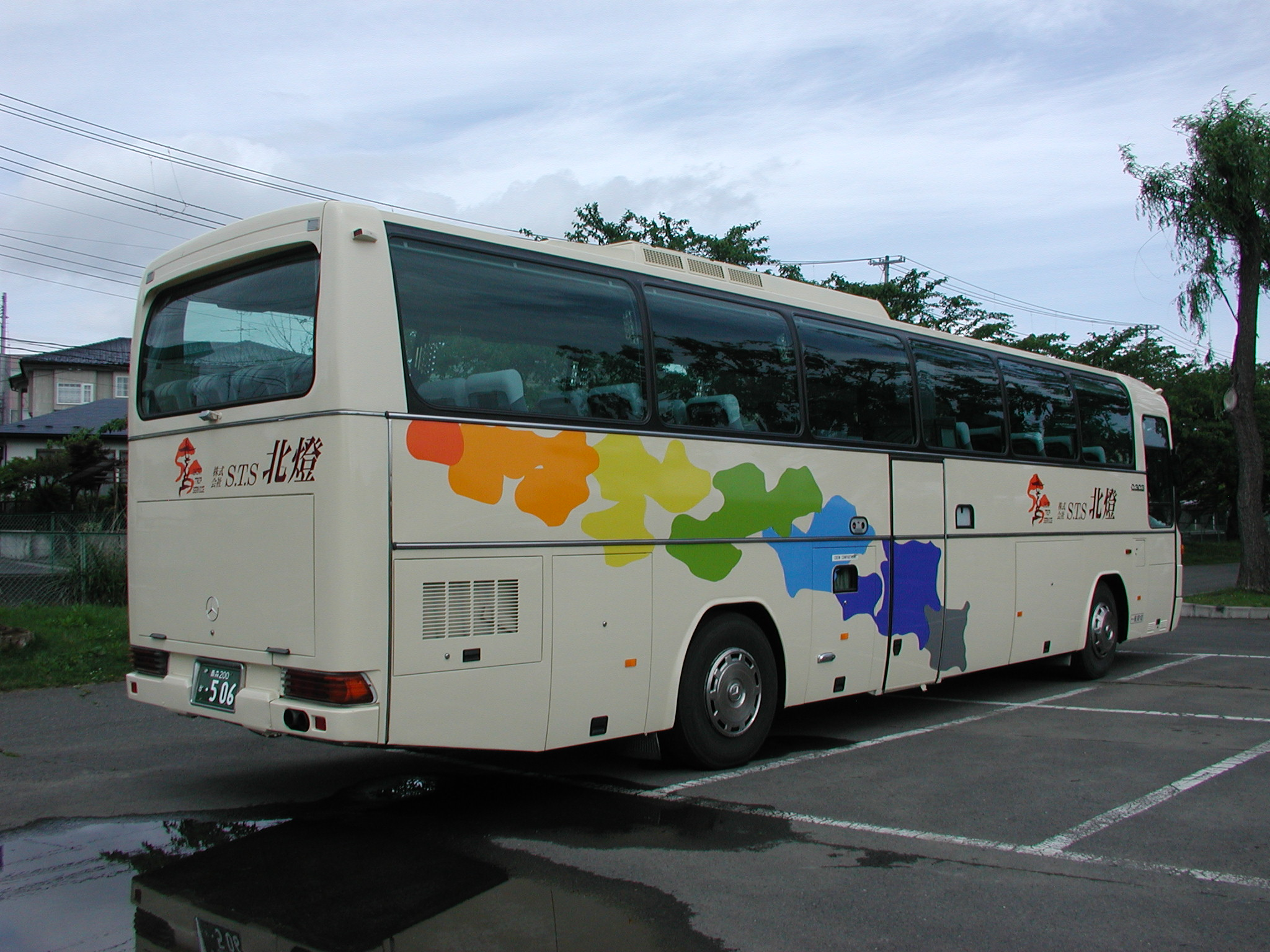
Rear view

== History ==
The Mercedes-Benz O303 was launched in 1974 at the Paris Motor Show as a replacement for the O302. In 1985, the O303 became the first bus to offer anti-lock braking.

Over 35,000 O303s were built and sold over an eighteen-year period, making it the most produced coach in the world at the time. The O303 was superseded in 1991 by the O404, however licensed copies were assembled in knock-down kit form by Russian manufacturer Avtrokon at their Golitsyno factory, located on the outskirts of Moscow, from 1993 onwards.

== Gallery ==
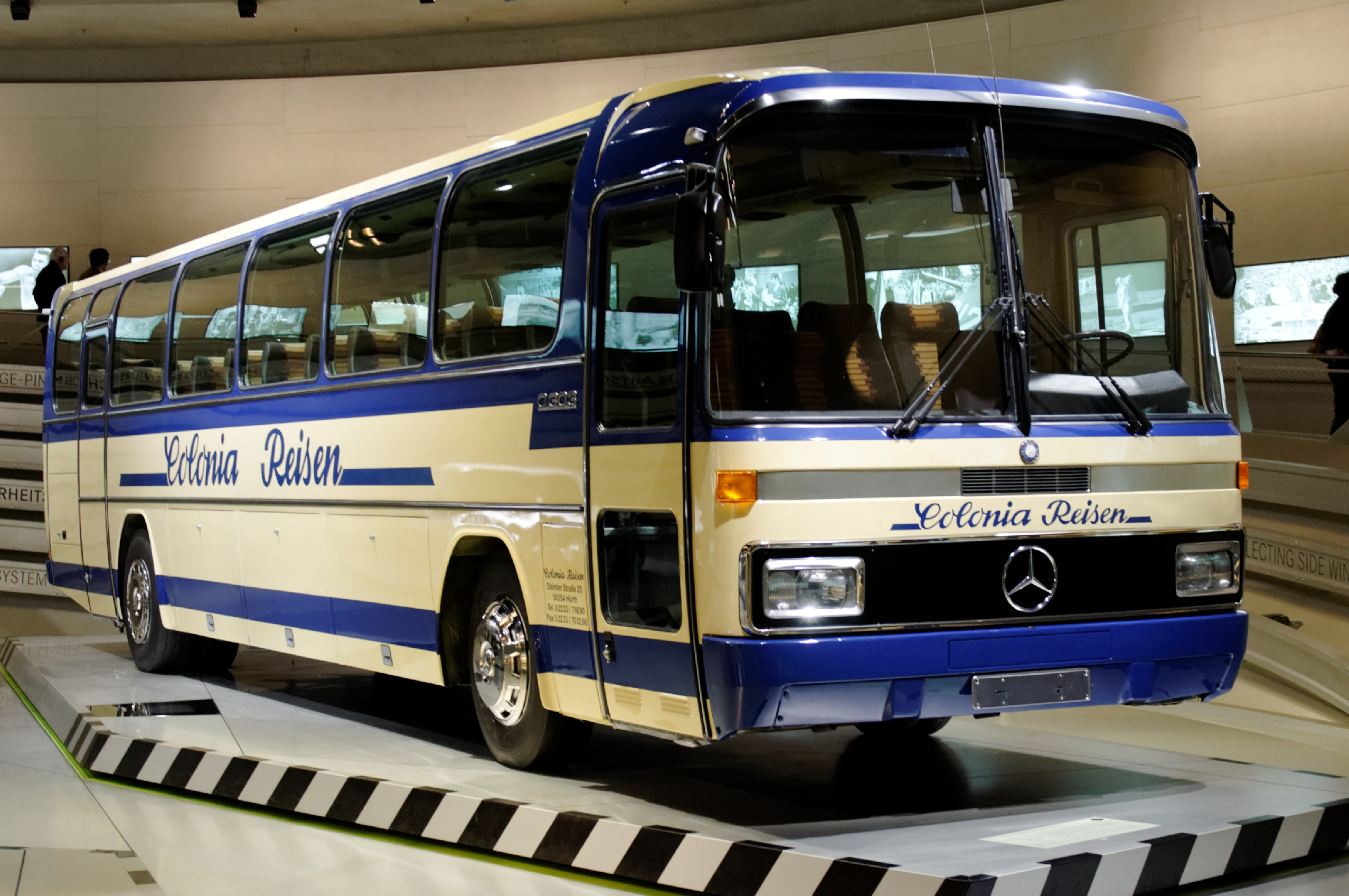
O303-15 RHP

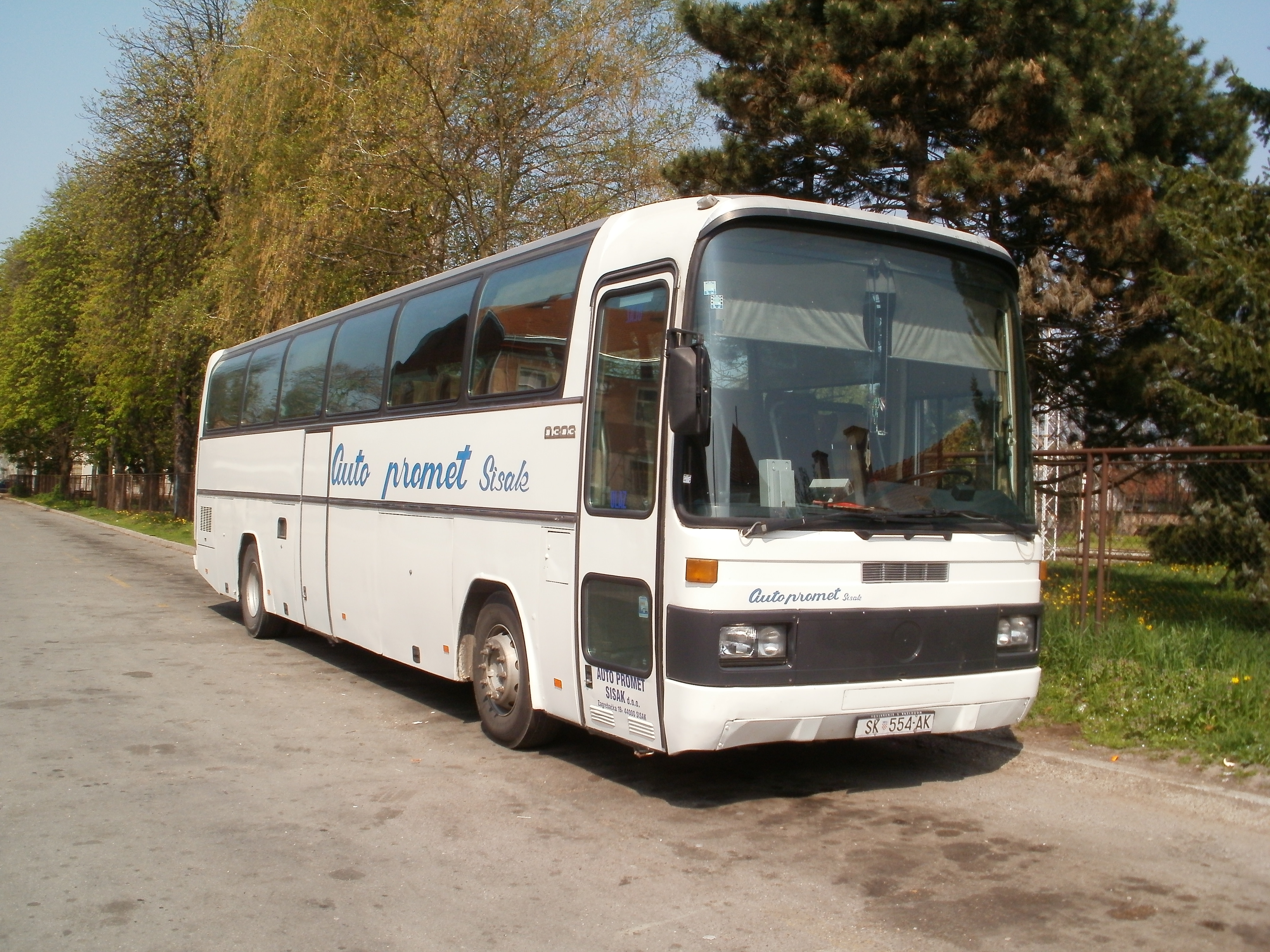
O303-14 RHD (Facelift)

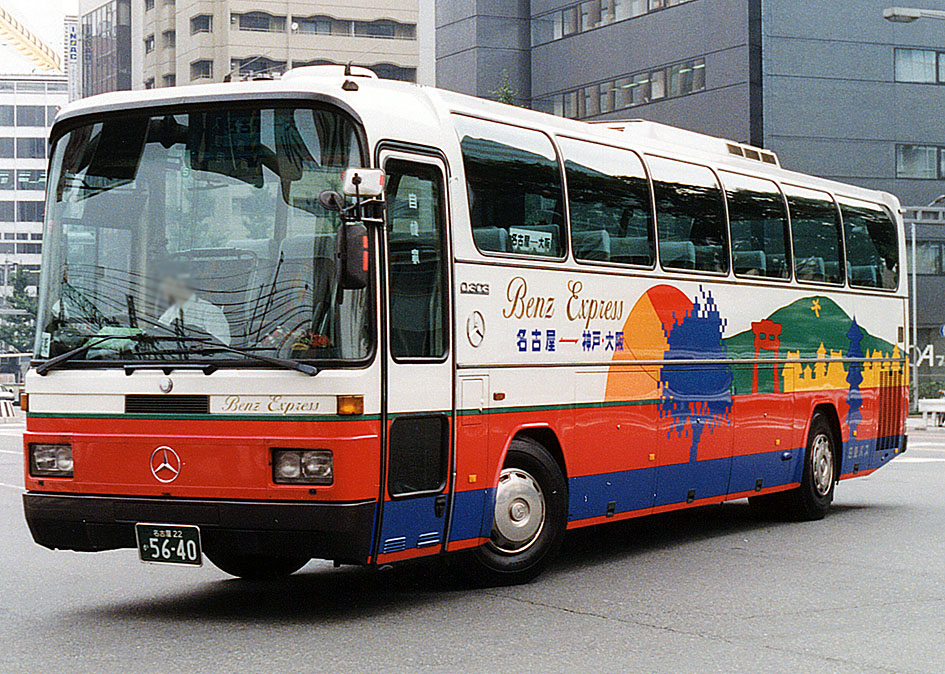
O303-15 RHD (Facelift)
