= Sfakianakis S.A. =

Greek conglomerate

- Industry: Automobile
- Predecessor: Biamax (since 1998)
- Founded: 1956; 70 years ago
- Defunct: 2012; 14 years ago
- Fate: stopped vehicle production in 2012, with a 41% stake sold to Vianex S.A.
- Products: Buses, armored vehicles
- Number of employees: 2,800

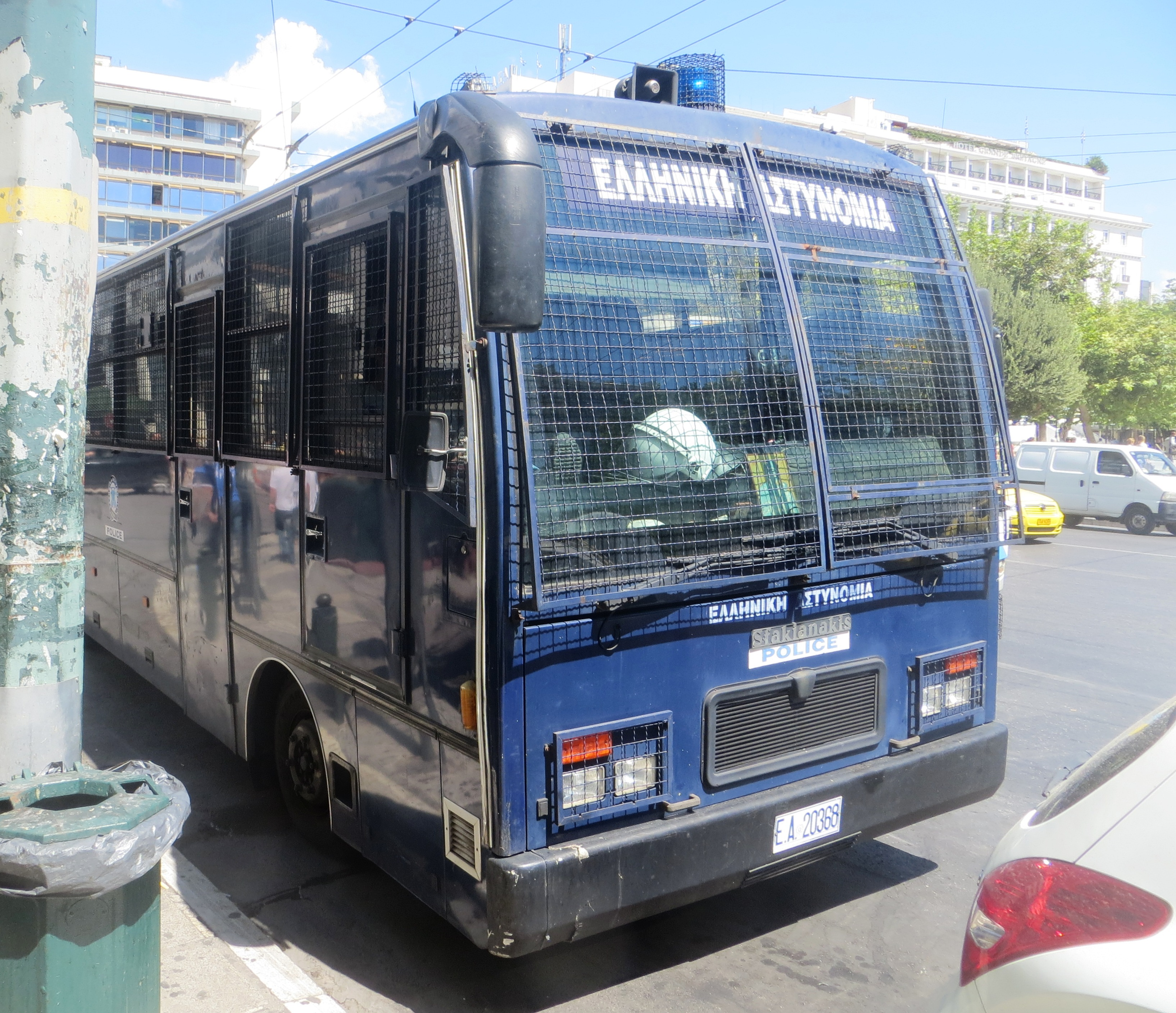
Sfakianakis Hellenic Police bus, one of many specialized types developed for state authorities and organizations

Sfakianakis Group is a Greek company that primarily focuses on the import, distribution, and trading of automobiles, trucks, and buses employing over 2800 in 6 countries in 2014.. The company has been in operation for several decades and has established itself as a prominent player in the Greek automotive market. It is known for representing and distributing various international brands, including Mercedes-Benz, Setra, and other well-known manufacturers.

Additionally, Sfakianakis Group is involved in the provision of after-sales services, spare parts, and accessories for the vehicles they distribute. They have an extensive network of dealerships and service centers throughout Greece to ensure customer satisfaction and maintain their strong market presence.

== History and evolution of the Industrial division ==
The company's origins were based on vehicle manufacture. Originally called Büssing Hellas (after the German manufacturer whose engines it used) it was founded in 1957 succeeding earlier trading companies founded by the same family. Initially building bodies on imported chassis, it soon developed its own chassis family (originally based on a German MAN model, the latter having acquired Büssing). The company's SS500 chassis ('SS' standing for 'Stratis Sfakianakis') was subsequently further developed, and a great variety of bus types was designed and built over it in the following years in the company's factory near Elefsina, with exports to Eastern Europe and the Middle East. Other industrial activities included construction of truck bodies and Japanese Hino chassis assembly. The company was renamed Sfakianakis S.A. in 1993 and among the last types it designed and produced were the SS400 and SS380 minibuses and a new series of SS500 inter-city and coach variants.

The Sfakianakis industrial division had managed to survive for decades without any state support, despite fierce competition from imports; a flood of cheaper imports, though, eventually made bus manufacture unprofitable. This division was greatly shrunk in 2006, after the group had very successfully diversified into other business areas including vehicle import and sales and the services sector.

== Evolution of the Sfakianakis Group ==
The parent company, Sfakianakis SA, was established in 1957 and remains family owned. With 500,000 customers and EUR500m revenues in 2009, Sfakianakis Group is now the largest automotive group in Greece, leading the market in automotive retail across eight businesses in Greece, Bulgaria and the Republic of North Macedonia. Specialist services include the import and distribution of automobiles, motorcycles, trucks and buses, the import and distribution of machinery for the construction, industrial and agricultural sectors, and a network of 24 dealerships retailing brands including Suzuki, BMW, Mini, Fiat, Alfa Romeo, Abarth, Nissan, Volvo, Ford, Opel, Renault, Dacia and Cadillac.

Sfakianakis, through its Executive Lease car rental division, represents Enterprise Rent-A-Car in Greece and thirteen other countries, including Albania, Bosnia and Herzegovina, Bulgaria, Croatia, Cyprus, the Republic of North Macedonia, Moldova, Montenegro, Romania, Serbia and Slovenia.

The conglomerate is also active in the mailing sector through its Speedex courier company, with 7 million yearly deliveries through 200 distribution centers servicing 14,000 destinations in 220 countries around the world. Speedex operates through 1,400 highly trained individuals with a fleet of 300 trucks and 700 motorcycles. It also makes air cargo deliveries to island destinations through Express Cargo.

Among other divisions, Sfakianakis is also active in electronics retail chains and large-scale construction through its directly owned subsidiaries.
