= FAP 1117 =

Overview
- Manufacturer: FAP
- Production: 2003

Body and chassis
- Class: 4x4 Utility, Transport Truck
- Body style: COE

Powertrain
- Engine: Mercedes-Benz OM 904 LA, EU3
- Transmission: FAP 5MS 60.075

Dimensions
- Wheelbase: 3,600 mm (141.7 in)
- Length: 6,400 mm (252.0 in)
- Width: 2,500 mm (98.4 in)
- Height: 3,200 mm (126.0 in)
- Curb weight: 7,400 kg (16,314 lb)

Chronology
- Successor: FAP 1118

FAP 1117 was the predecessor of the latest FAP military truck version, FAP 1118. This is an all-terrain vehicle developed by VTI and scheduled for production by FAP factory in Priboj. It was not introduced in serial production, being only prototype, while its lightly improved successor, FAP 1118 is in full serial production.

It is designed for transport of personnel, weapons and material of up to 4t gross weight, as well as for towing of artillery pieces and trailers. Equipped with all-wheel drive, locking of all differentials and powerful diesel engine, the vehicle is able to negotiate cross-country gradients of 60%. Central regulation of tire pressure assures high mobility over soft soil and its well thought out body geometry enables easy negotiating of natural and man-made obstacles such as trenches, railway embankments, escarps etc.

== Technical characteristics ==
- Model 1117 BS/36 4x4
- Gross vehicle weight[kg] 11.000
- Front axle permissible weight[kg] 5200
- Rear axle permissible weight[kg] 5800
- Pay load[kg] 4000
- Engine - type MB OM 904 LA EU3
- Number of cylinders 4
- Bore/stroke [mm] 102/130
- Displacement [dm3] 4250
- Power [kW (HP)/min-1] 130(174KS)/2200
- Peak torque [Nm/min-1] 675/1200-1600
- Electrical system [V] 24
- Batteries 2 x 12 V/110 Ah
- Clutch GMF 330 X
- Gearbox FAP 5MS 60.075
- Gear ratio 8.02
- Reverse 6.92
- Front axle AL 3/1 D-6
- Rear axle FAP NG 10 t
- Total transmission ratio 6.143
- Steering PPT 8042
- Cabin short
- Size of cargo body [mm] 4000 x 2430 x 1700
- Wheel 9,00 - 22,5
- Rims 9.0 - 18
- Tire 13 R 18 PR 12
- Brakes Pneumatic dual circuit with ALB
- Fuel tank capacity [1] 216
- Max. speed [km/h] 93
- Max. grading [%] 60
