= Mercedes-Benz O302 =

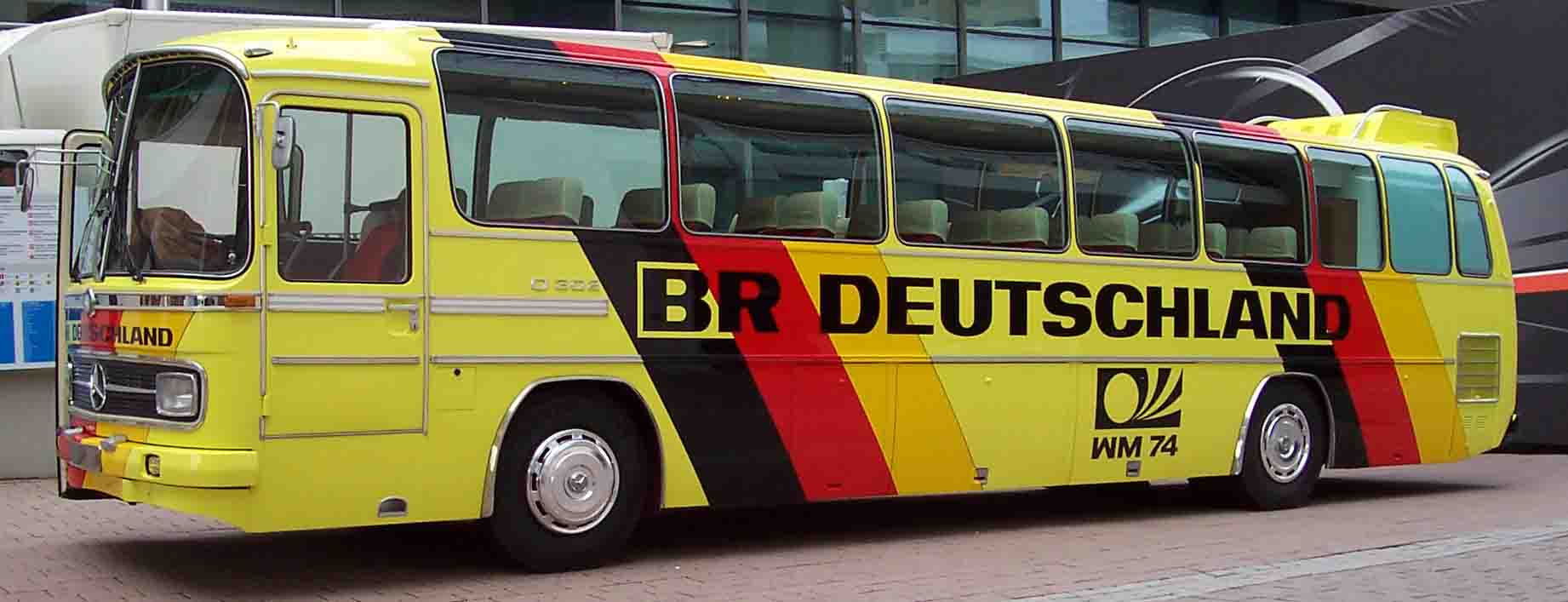
- Preserved Mercedes-Benz O302 painted as the West German team bus for the 1974 FIFA World Cup

Overview
- Manufacturer: Mercedes-Benz
- Production: 1965-74; 1972-76 (in Hyundai, Korea)

Body and chassis
- Doors: 1
- Floor type: Step entrance

Powertrain
- Engine: Mercedes-Benz OM 352; Mercedes-Benz OM 327; Mercedes-Benz OM 355; Mercedes-Benz OM 360

Dimensions
- Length: 9.6-11.9 metres

Chronology
- Predecessor: Mercedes-Benz O321
- Successor: Mercedes-Benz O303

The Mercedes-Benz O302 is a coach chassis manufactured by Mercedes-Benz between 1965 and 1974.

== History ==
The Mercedes-Benz O302 was launched in May 1965 as a replacement for the O321. It was manufactured by Mercedes-Benz's Mannheim plant. Its body was designed to an austere Bauhaus style. The O302 was sold as both a chassis and as an integral bus with Mercedes-Benz supplying the body.

Over 32,000 O302s were built over an eleven-year period, most as coaches but some were built as buses. It was superseded by the O303.

A joint venture of Mercedes OTOMARSAN of Aksaray, Turkey (later became Mercedes-Benz Türk) derived O302T model from O302 and O305. Most appealing difference is box-shaped chassis and stronger engine. During their production time O302 and O302T was mostly preferred as city buses and coaches in Turkey. Some of them are still used as caravans or very light duties by the bus enthusiasts.

For the 1974 FIFA World Cup in West Germany, each team was transported in a coach painted in the team's colours.
