= Fabrika automobila Priboj =

Serbian manufacturer of military vehicles

Coordinates: 43°34′10″N 19°31′43″E

FAP
- Native name: Корпорација ФАП; Korporacija FAP
- Type: Joint-stock company
- Industry: Automotive
- Founded: 29 July 1952; 74 years ago
- Founder: Radmilo Lavrenčić
- Headquarters: Radnička bb, Priboj, Serbia
- Area served: Worldwide
- Key people: Dejan Golubović (General director)
- Products: Trucks, Chassis, Truck trailers
- Revenue: ▲€12.60 million (2024)
- Net income: ▲€2.65 million (2024)
- Total assets: ▲€31.97 million (2024)
- Total equity: ▲€6.25 million (2024)
- Owner: Government of Serbia (47.3%); Pension Insurance Fund (16.3%); Municipality of Priboj (11.4%); Health Insurance Fund (11%); Others
- Number of employees: 138 (2024)
- Subsidiaries: FAP Stan; FAP Livnica Prijepolje; FAP Lim; FAP Transport
- Website: fap.co.rs
- Footnotes; Business ID: 07210434; Tax ID: 101206591

Korporacija Fabrika automobila Priboj (Serbian: Корпорација Фабрика Аутомобила Прибој, romanized: Korporacija Fabrika Automobila Priboj; abbr. FAP) is a Serbian automotive manufacturer of military vehicles.

FAP initially produced licensed copies of Saurer trucks and produced Mercedes-Benz NG trucks under license. FAP is now majority owned by the Government of Serbia. As of 2024, it has 138 employees and an annual revenue of €12.6 million.

== History ==
=== 1952–1970s: Early years ===
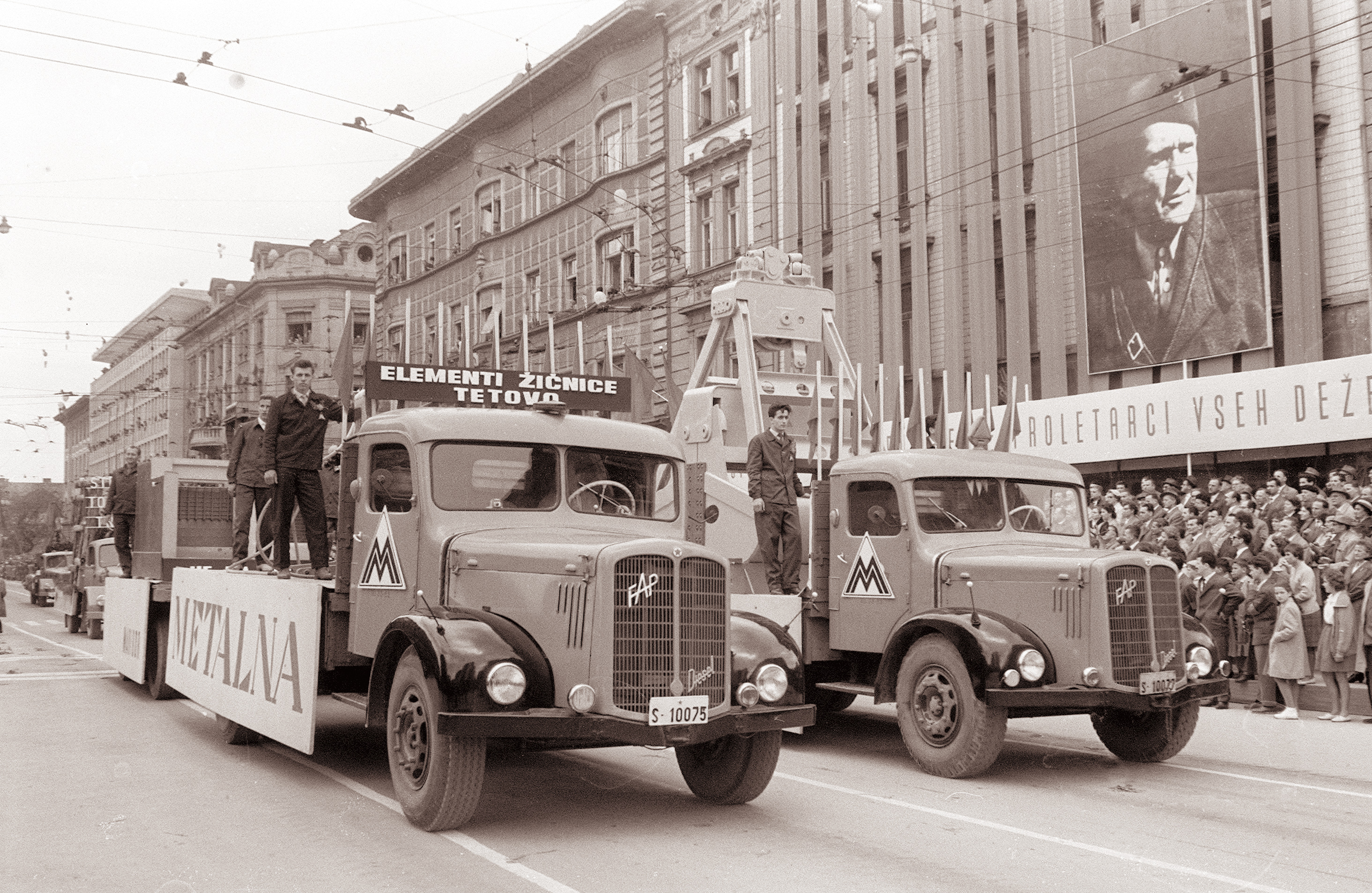
FAP 6G on May Day parade in Ljubljana, 1961

FAP was founded in 1952 by a decree of the Socialist Federal Republic of Yugoslavia. Production of the first FAP trucks began in 1953, which were based on a licence obtained from Swiss manufacturer Saurer. The first models were called the 4G and 6G (in reference to their vehicle weight of 4 and 6 tonnes, respectively). In 1959, FAP’s factory was expanded where capacity grew to 3,600 vehicles per year.

In 1961, the vehicles and engine manufacturers group ITV was formed with FAP as a member. The first domestically designed FAP vehicles were the FAP 10B and FAP 15B, which were introduced in serial production by 1965. The FAP 18B was made with a Leyland engine licence built by FAMOS.

In 1970, a production, technical and financial cooperation contract was signed with Daimler-Benz. The first product from FAP based on a contract with Daimler-Benz was the FAP LP1113, followed by the FAP MB 1213 and the FAP O 302.

=== 1970s–1990s: Export success and international expedition ===
On 15 July 1970, FAP started production and financial agreements with Yugoslavian enterprises FAMOS (SR Bosnia and Herzegovina), Autokaroserija (SR Croatia), and 11 Oktomvri (SR Macedonia). FAP also began exporting vehicles to overseas markets in Africa such as Egypt, Tanzania, Sudan, Tunisia, Libya, and Nigeria.

By 1975, a new 50,000 square meter manufacturing plant was built. 150 new machines were installed and projected capacity was 10,000 vehicles per year. In 1976, FAP’s licensing contract with Mercedes-Benz was extended. Many new 12 to 26 tonne vehicles were produced such as the FAP 1616, 1620, 1626, 1921, 1926, 2226, and 2626. In 1978, FAP collaborated with the Military Technical Institute Belgrade to develop the FAP 2026/6×6, a special military vehicle. It was produced in the following years in many different variants to satisfy various military applications. FAP also produced many different chassis used in factories across Yugoslavia (Zagreb, Skopje, and Belgrade) as bases for producing buses and other vehicles. In 1984, FAP again extended production in the newly built Manovica industrial zone where 20 to 70 gross tonne trailers were developed near their dedicated design centre. In 1986, FAP’s licence with Mercedes-Benz was once again extended to produce vehicles weighing 12 to 26 gross tonnes. By 1991, FAP had 16,468 square meters of factory space. Trucks and other products were exported worldwide.

=== 1990s–2010s: Limited operation ===
The endurance of the FAP trucks was tested in the Gobi Desert during the 1995–1996 Putevi sveta ("On Pathways of the World" in Serbian) expedition. This was done in the FAP 2026 GC/B 6x6, which was produced in collaboration with Ikarbus. The aim of this expedition was to complete a journey starting in Priboj and which continued through Belgrade, Moscow, Ulaanbaatar, and Beijing, eventually returning to Priboj through Dalyan and Belgrade. Despite taking place during the winter season, Putevi sveta was complete in only 139 days.

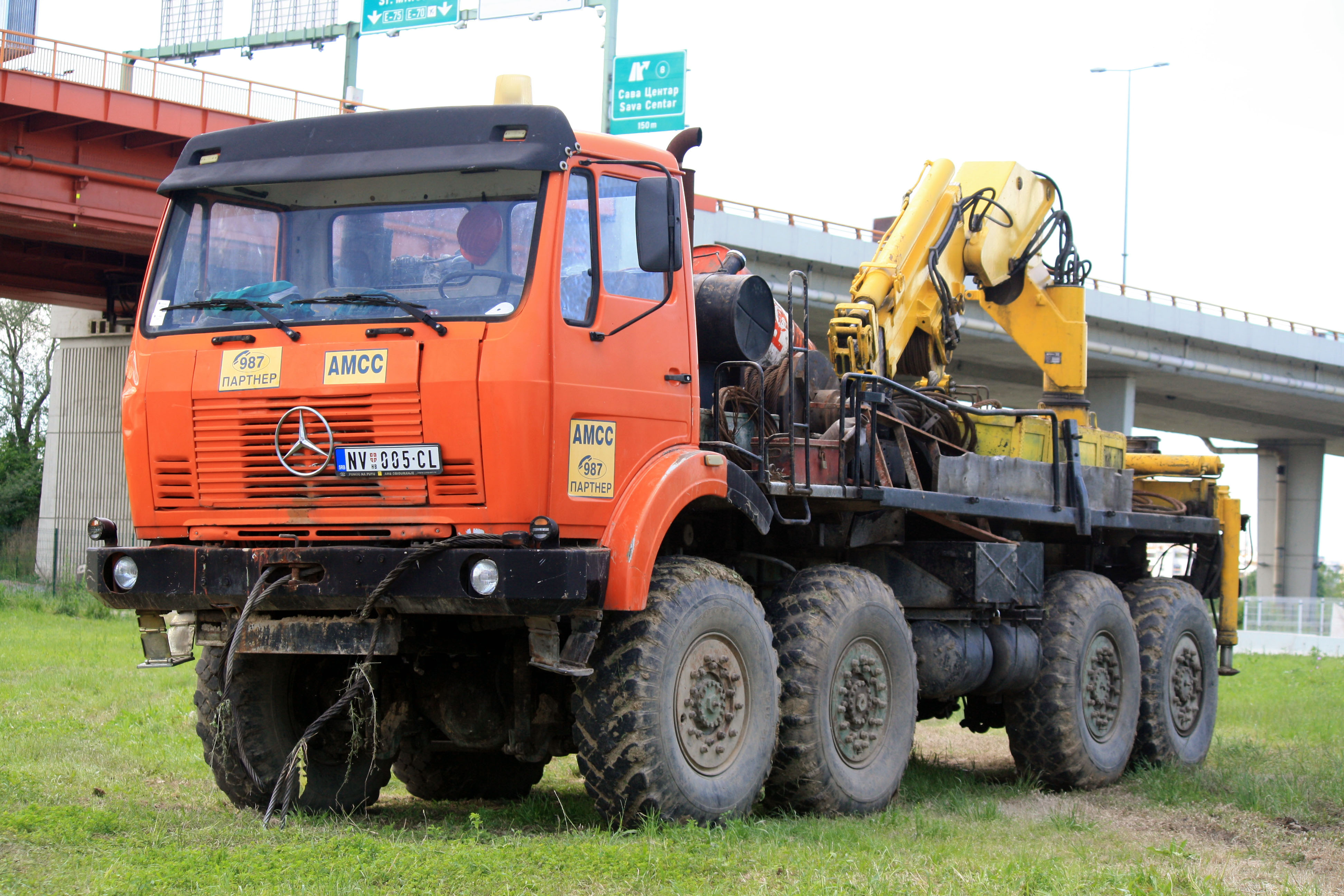
Fap 2832 8x8 military truck

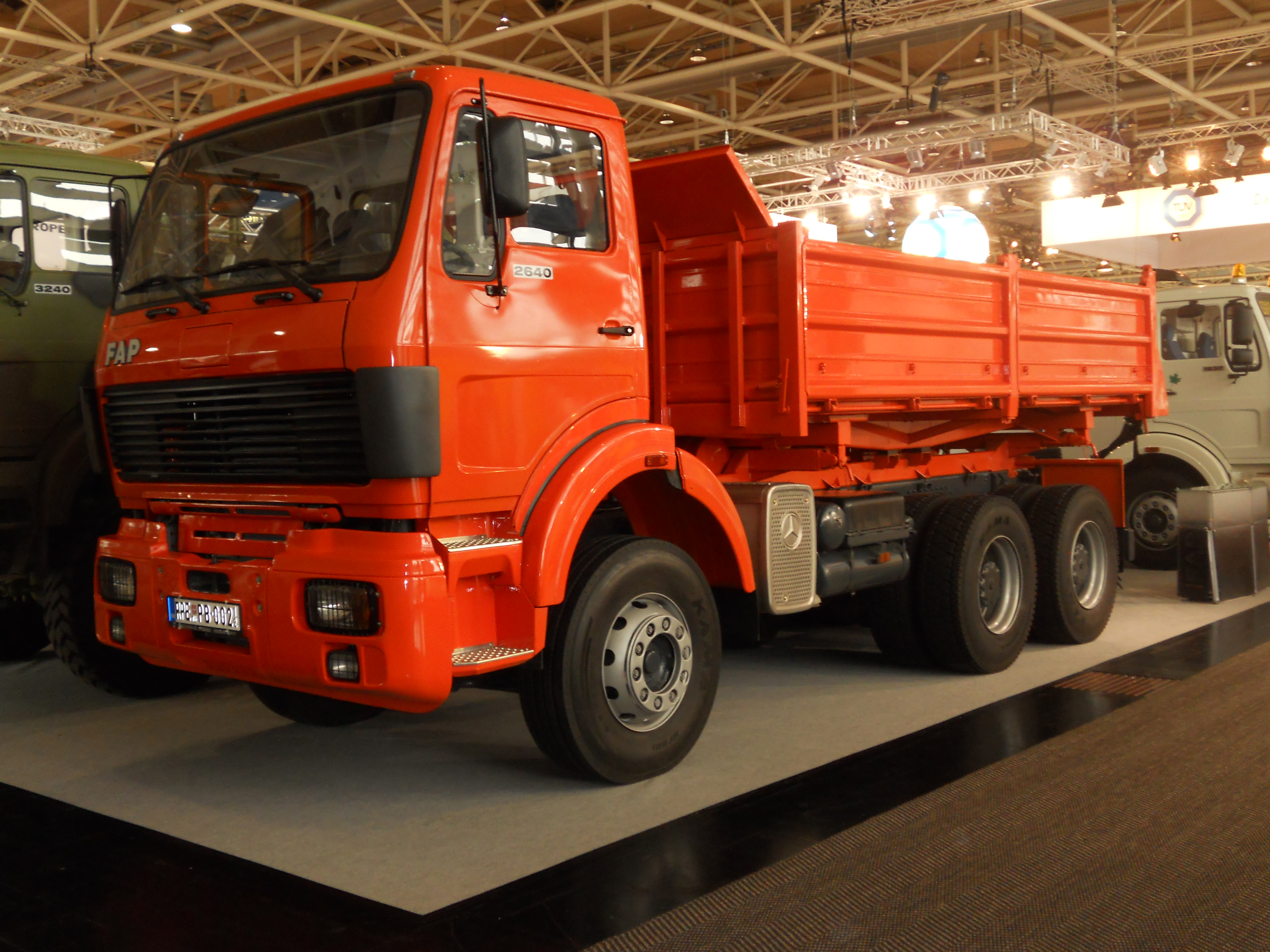
FAP 2640 rigid dump truck, a copy of the Mercedes-Benz NG, exhibited at IAA 2012 in Hanover, Germany.

During a severe economic crisis in Serbia in the 1990s, FAP sales went down. This resulted in significantly less vehicle production and research into new products.

During the 2000s, FAP offered many variants of vehicles based on old Mercedes tooled models. These vehicles used different engines manufactured by Mercedes-Benz, Cummins, MAN, and FAMOS. Despite their past financial difficulties, FAP was able to produce vehicles for both domestic and international markets. Exported vehicles can still be found in many countries such as Egypt, Nigeria, Libya, Sudan, and Syria.

Production lines consisted of military and civilian vehicles. FAP also built chassis, trailers aggregates (axles, transmissions, spare parts, cabins, and shipbuilding parts). All vehicles produced had Euro 3, Euro 4, or Euro 5.

=== 2014–present: Military-oriented production ===
In 2014, Finnish truck maker Sisu Auto put an offer to buy FAP in collaboration with the Government of Serbia. However, negotiations were shut down due to disagreements in strategy between all parties. Over the years, the Government of Serbia has worked to revitalize FAP. This has led to more than 1,000 employees leaving FAP with severance payments.

Since 2014, FAP has operated as a manufacturer and overhaul provider for the Serbian Army. In 2017, FAP delivered ten new trucks to the Serbian Army, as part of a €2.5 million deal with the Serbian Ministry of Defence. In 2022, FAP signed a new contract with the Ministry of Defence worth €3.1 million.

On its 70th anniversary in 2023, FAP presented a prototype for a facelifted civilian truck called the FAP 2240. The 2240 featured a new grille, front bumper and headlight design as well as a completely overhauled interior taken from the Chinese BeiBen NG80. The FAP 2240 is equipped with a 6 cylinder Mercedes-Benz OM457 engine making 400 HP and a 16-speed ZF Ecosplit manual transmission. The FAP 2240 can also hold up to 400 litres of fuel and has a top speed of 95 km/h. The FAP 2240 has yet to reach series production.

== Production lines ==
=== Military production line ===
- FAP 1118
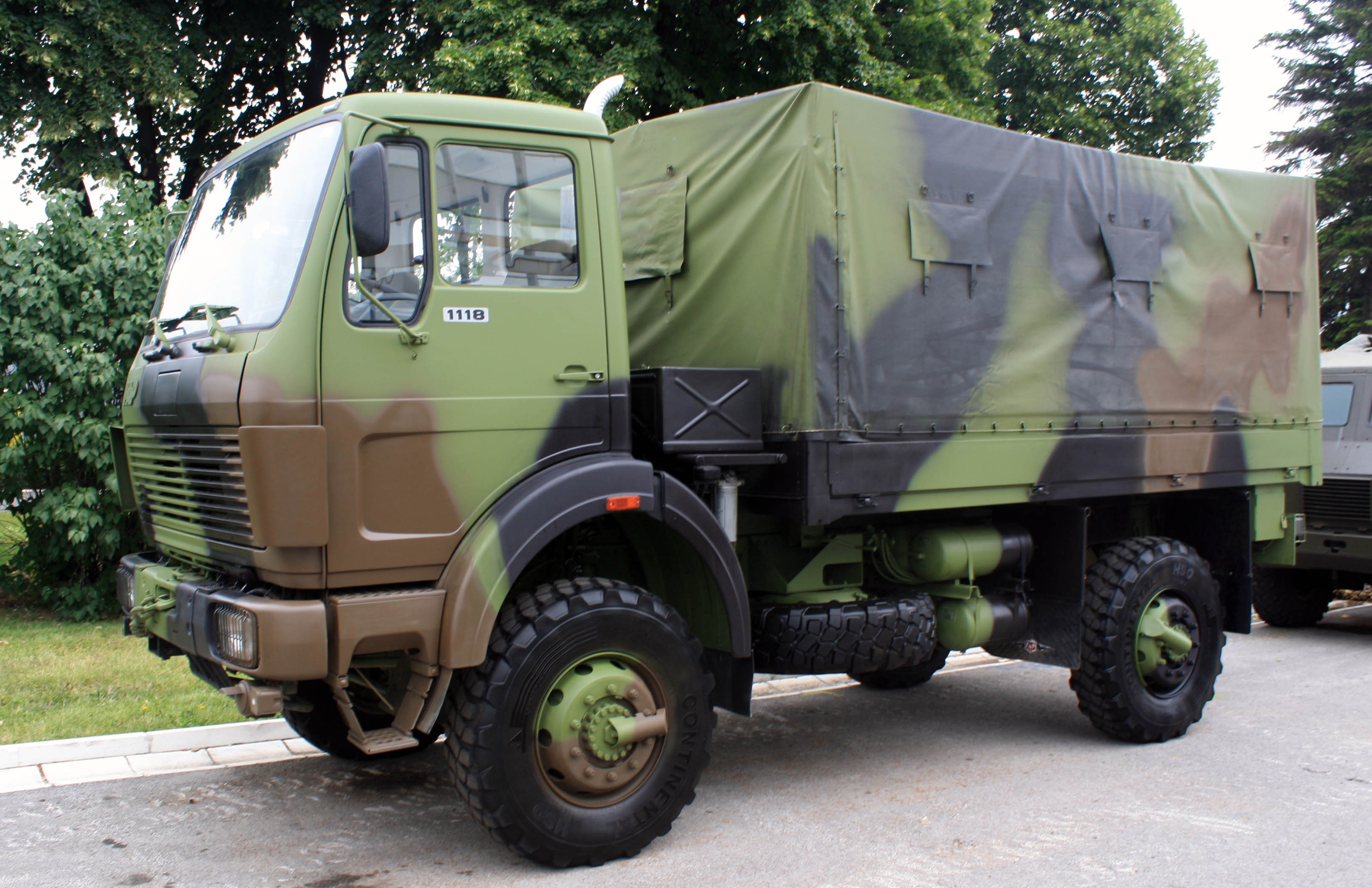
  FAP 1118
- FAP 2228
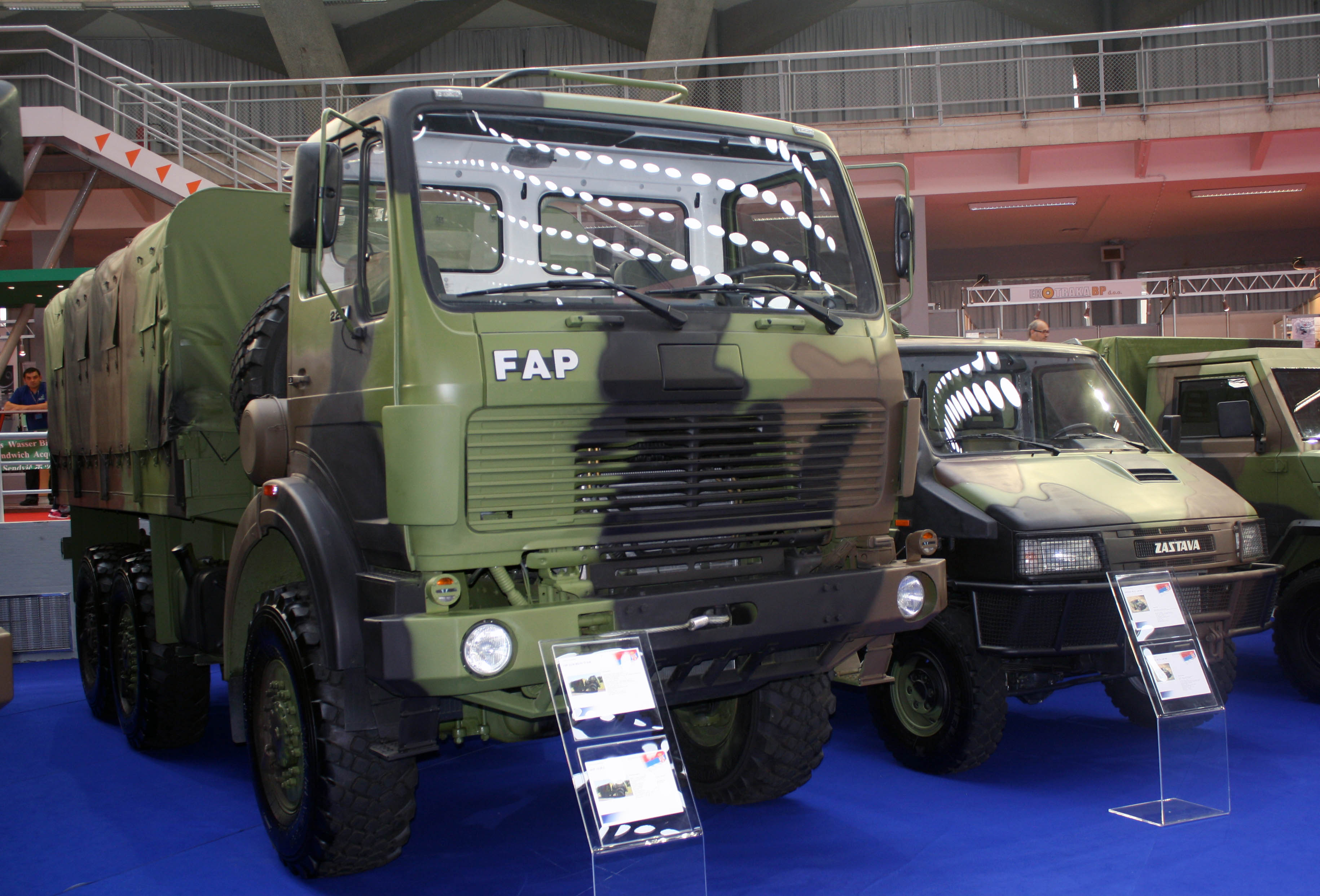
  FAP 2228
- FAP 3240
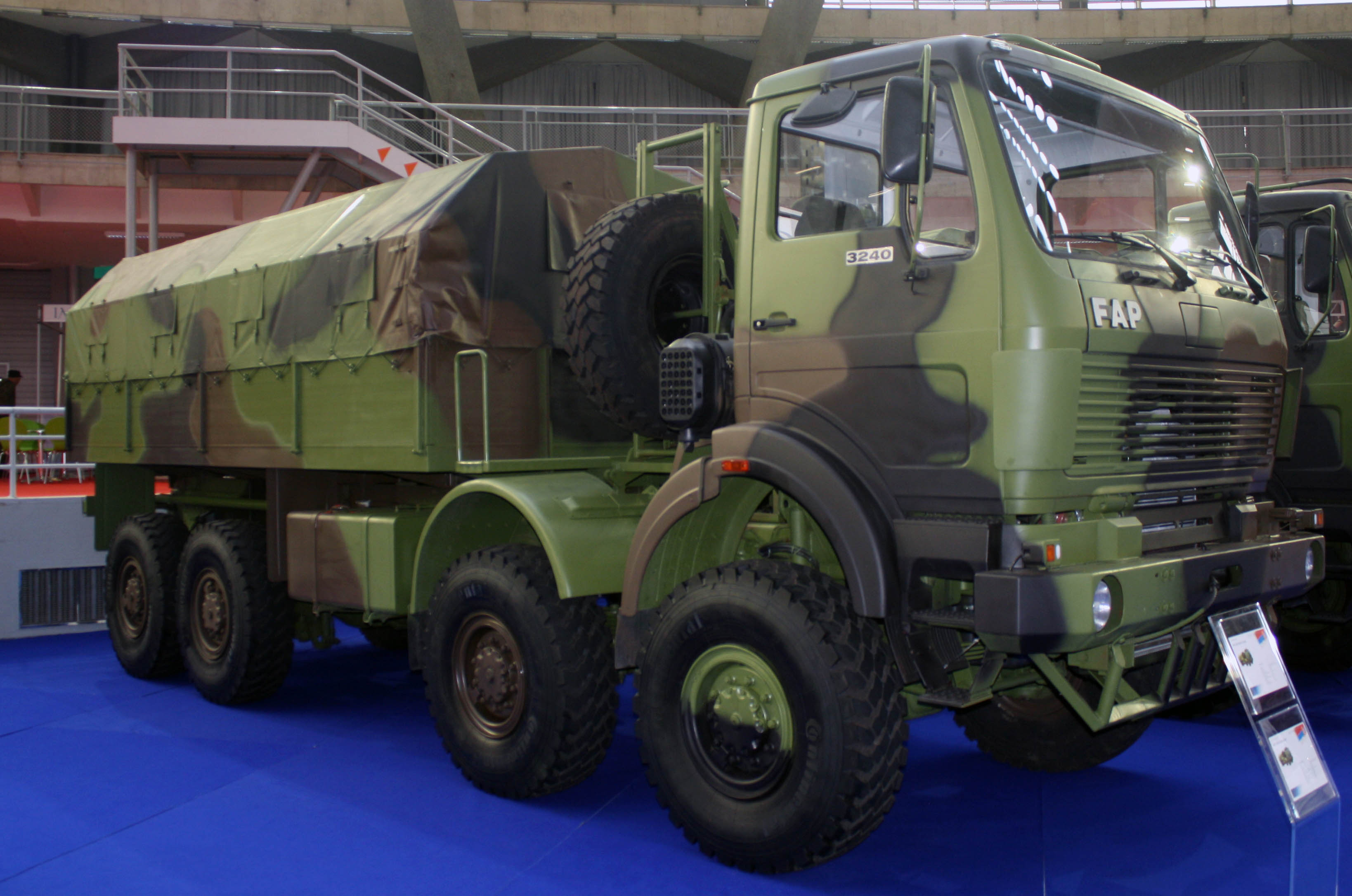
  FAP 3240
- FAP 1318
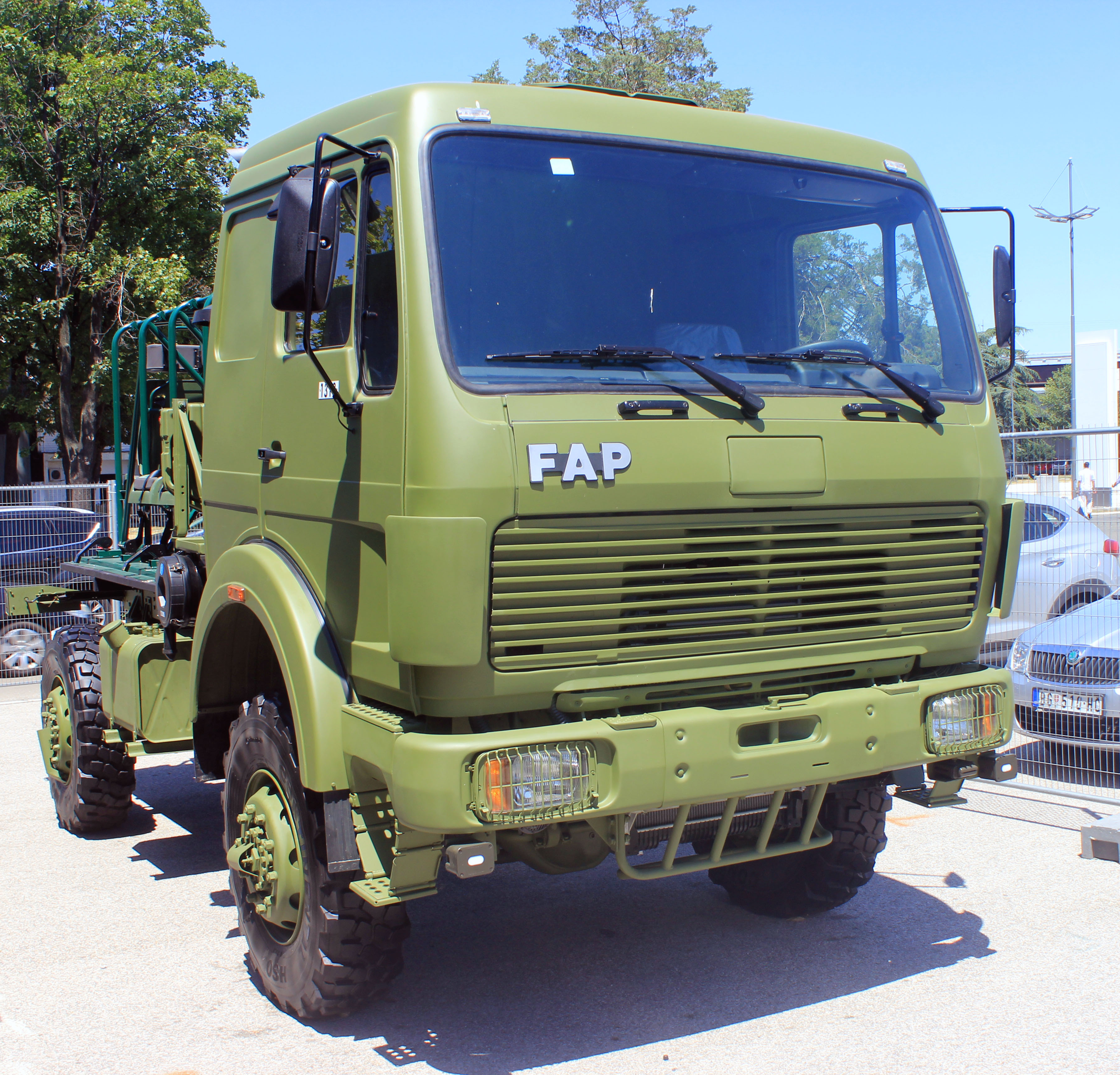
- FAP 1318 BDS-AV on defense fair Partner 2017

=== Civilian production program ===
==== Lorries/trucks ====
- 1318 B/42 Engine type OM 904 LA EU3 or OM 904 LA EU5
- 1824 BD/48 4x2 Engine type OM 906 LA EU5
- 1828 BD/48 4x2 Engine type MB OM 906 LA EU3
- 1829 BD/48 4x2 Engine type OM 906 LA EU5
- 2235 BD/45 6x2 Engine type OM 457 LA EU3
- 2236 BD/45 6x2 Engine type ISL 8.9 EU5 360
- 2240 BD/45 6x2 Engine type OM457 LA EU5 (PROTOTYPE)

==== Tractors ====
- 1836 BDT/32 4x2 Engine type OM 457 LA EU3
- 1840 BDT/32 4x2 Engine type OM 457 LA EU3
- 2636 BDT/32 6x4 Engine type OM 457 LA EU3
- 2636 BDT/32 6x4 Engine type OM 457 LA EU3

==== Dump trucks ====
- 1318 BK/36 4x2 Engine type OM 904 LA EU3 or OM 904 LA EU5
- 1418 BSK/36 4x4 Engine type OM 904 LA EU3 or OM 904 LA EU5
- 2024 BK/38 4x2 Engine type OM 906 LA EU5
- 2024 BSK/38 4x4 Engine type OM 906 LA EU5
- 2629 BK/32 6x4 Engine type OM 906 LA EU5
- 2630 BK/32 6x4 Engine type ISB 6.7 E5 300
- 2636 BK/32 6x4 Engine type OM 457 LA EU5
- 3036 BK/32 6x4 Engine type OM 457 LA EU5
- 3240 BKM/32 6x4 Engine type OM 457 LA EU5 or CUMMINS ISLe4 + 400 EU4
- 4140 BKM/45 8x4/4 Engine type OM 457 LA EU5

==== Buses ====
FAP produces a variety of buses: City buses, Suburb buses, Intercity buses, Minibuses.

- City Bus A-537.4 CNG Engine type CUMMINS –CGe4-280 –Euro 4
- City Bus A-537.3 Engine type MB OM 457 hla EU3 or MAN D2066LUH 11 EU4
- City Bus A-537.5 Engine type OM 457h LA EU5
- Single low Floor City Bus A-547.3 Engine type MB OM 457h LA EU3 or MAN D2066 LUH 12 EU4
- Double low Floor City Bus A-559.4 Engine type MAN D2066 LUH 12 EU4
- Midibus A-402 - Cummins engine B180-20

==== Chassis ====
There is also a chassis in production. They are used as bases for different kinds of vehicles and special upgrades.

- Chassis A-918 Engine type Cummins B 180 - 20

== Vehicle history production lines ==
List of vehicles which are no longer in production.

=== Military ===
List of past produced military vehicles:

- FAP 13
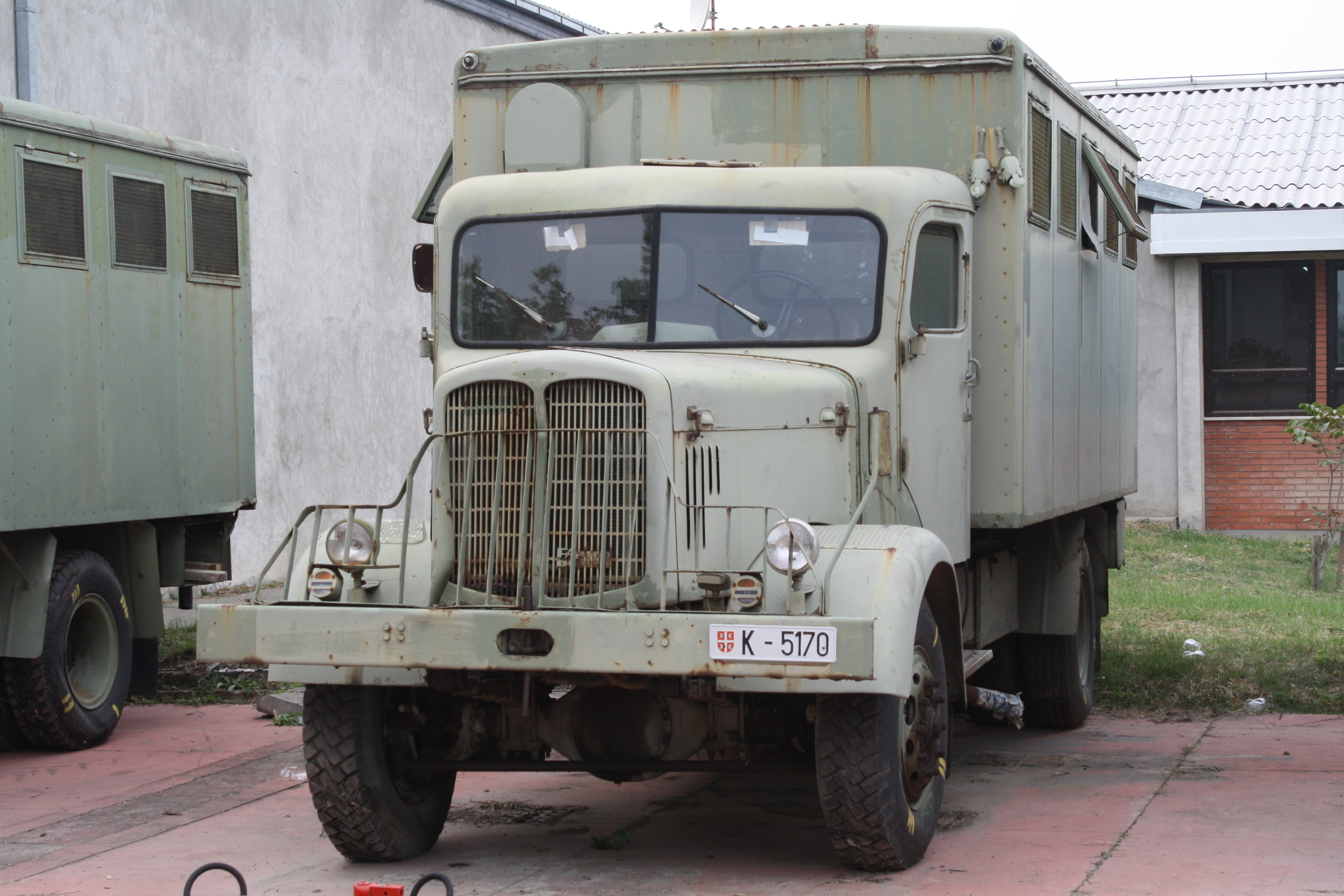
  FAP 13
- 13-14K
- 18
- M930
- 1117 (4x4)
- 2026 (6x6)
- 2832 (8x8)

=== Civilian ===
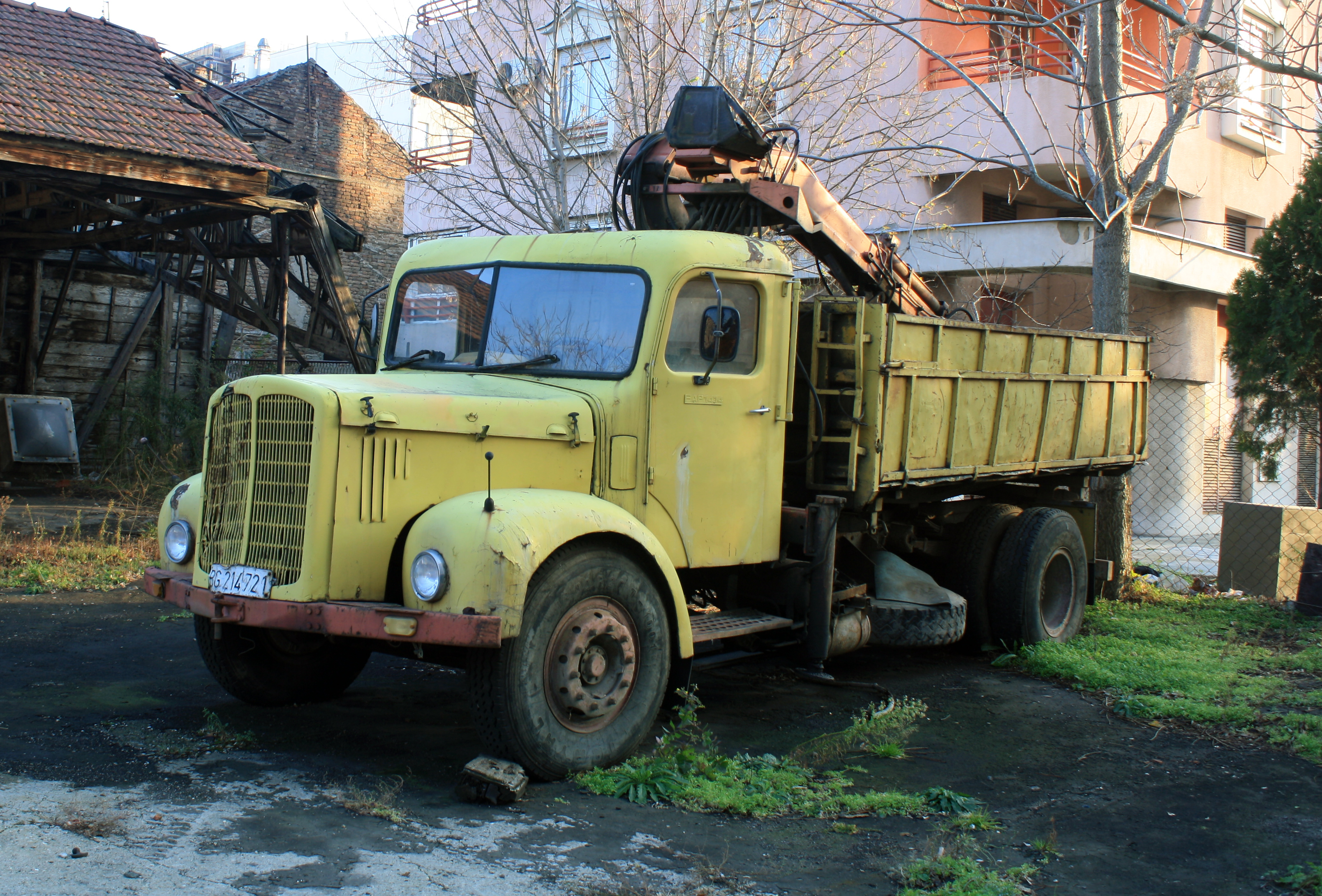
- FAP 1414

List of past produced civilian vehicles:

- 4G
- 6G
- 10B
- 15B
- G1100
- 13
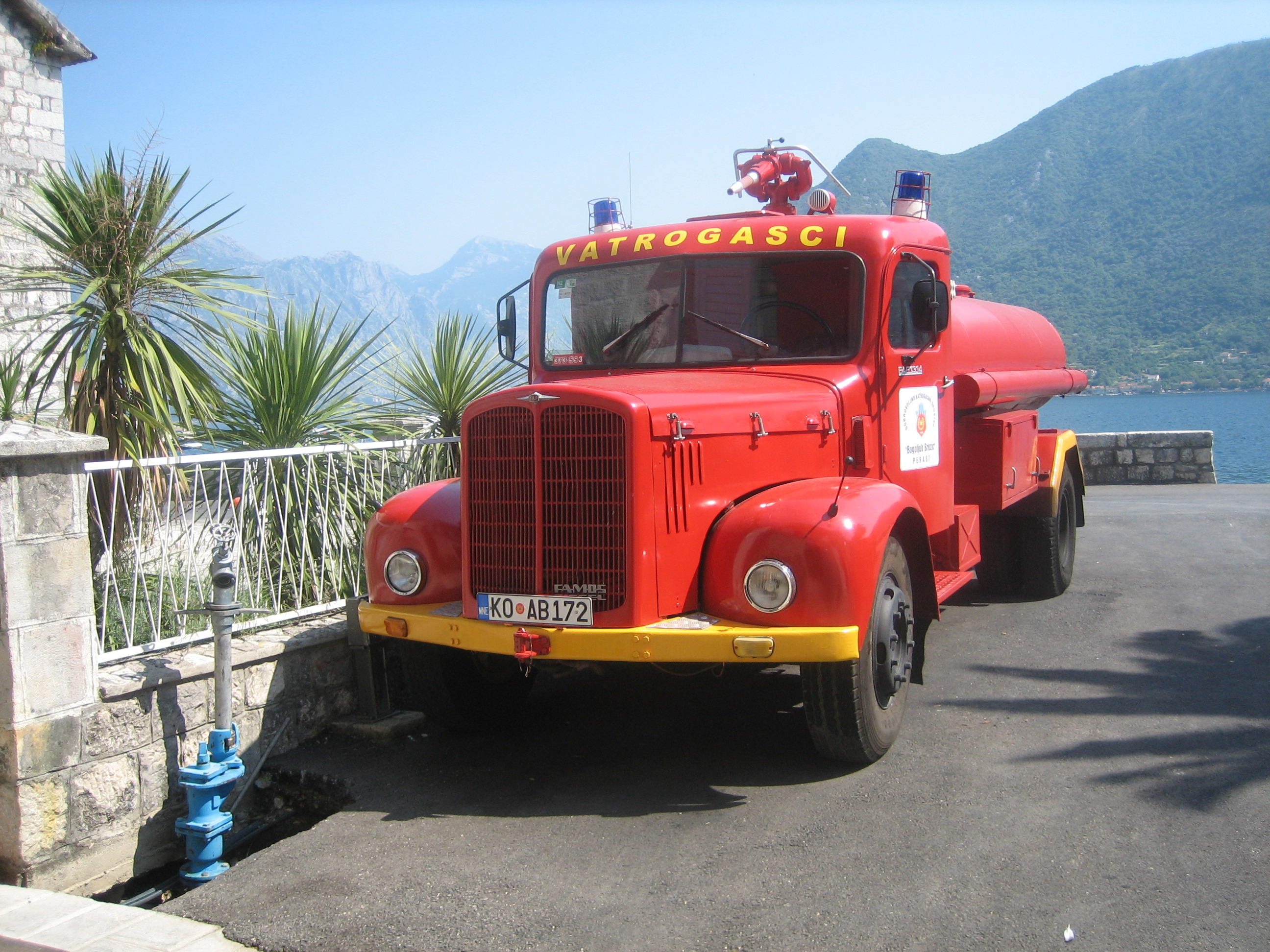
  FAP 1314 fire truck in Perast, Montenegro
- 18 - Engine based on licence obtained by Leyland
- LP1113
- MB 1213
- O 302
- 1620
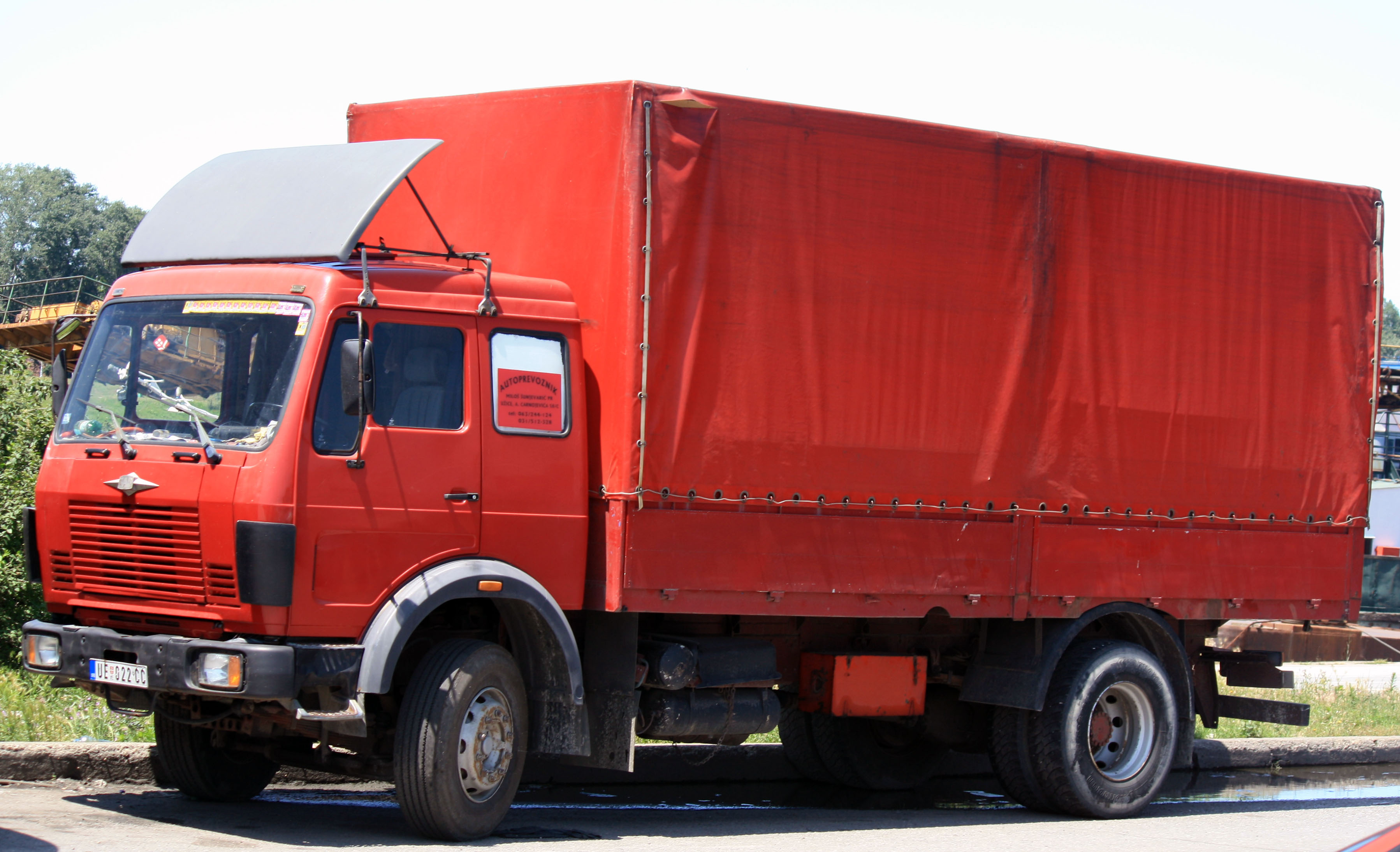
  FAP 1620
- 1621
- 1820
- 1823
- 1835 RBDT
- 2640 RBDT
- 1922 RBSK
- 2021 RBK
- 2023 RBK
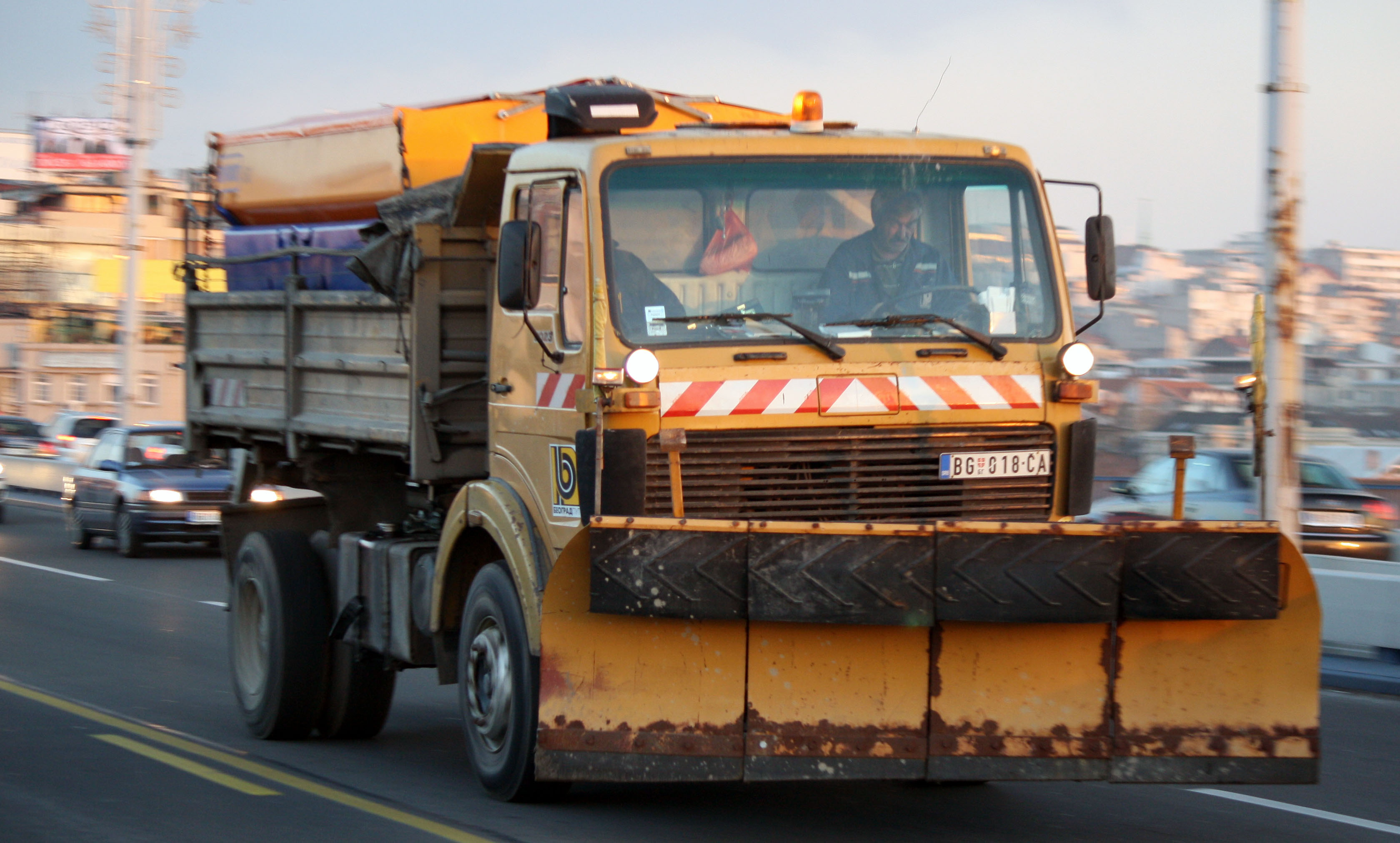
  FAP 2023 RBK
- 2228
- 2635 RBDT
- 2628 RBK
- 2632 RBK
- 2635 RBK
- 3035 RBK
- A-637
- A-777

== See also ==
- TAM
- Defense industry of Serbia
