= Mercedes-Benz OM904 engine =

Diesel engine

The Mercedes-Benz OM904 is a 4.2 liter (4,249cc) Inline-four engine (I4) OHV Diesel engine with 3 valves per cylinder. It is related to the OM906 Straight-six engine which has two extra cylinders, while the bore and stroke remain unchanged.

It launched in 1996 and had a Unit injector system to deliver fuel to every cylinder. It used a twin-scroll Turbocharger that was giving ~0.5-1.4atm of boost.

Engine Details
Power:	75-130kW (101-174hp) @ 2,200 rpm	Height:	930mm (36.6in)
Torque:	400-670Nm (295-494lb.ft) @ 1,200-1,600 rpm	Weight:	405kg (893lbs)
Aspiration:	Twin-scroll turbocharger, intercooler	Injection:	Direct injection
Compression Ratio:	18:1	Boost:	0.5-1.4atm
Bore:	102mm (4in)	Launch Year:	1996
Stroke:	130mm (5.1in)		
Displacement:	4,249cc (259.3CI)		
Redline:	2,300		
Length:	944mm (37.2in)		
Width:	610mm (24in)		

== Torque Curve ==
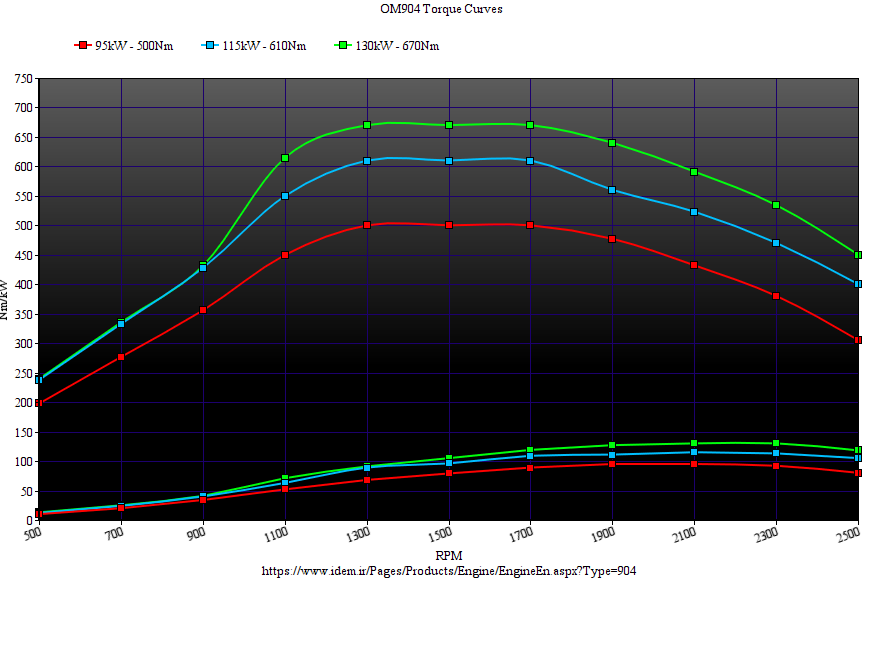

== See also ==
- List of Mercedes-Benz engines
