= Mercedes-Benz O370 =

Mercedes-Benz bus for the Brazilian market

Overview
- Manufacturer: Mercedes-Benz

Body and chassis
- Floor type: step entrance

Powertrain
- Engine: 200 to 320 hp depending on model
- Capacity: 28

The Mercedes-Benz O370 is a coach made in Brazil in the 1980s. The bus shared some similarities to another bus produced by the manufacturer at the same time, the Mercedes-Benz 0371. The 0370 has a capacity of 28 people that could be upgraded and costed $450,000 USD in 1989.

== Variants ==
The bus came in three different models - the O370RS with two axles and either a 240 or 285 hp engine, and the 0370RSD with three axles and a 285 or 320 hp engine, the 0370R with a 200 hp engine. The RS and the RSD model has pneumatic suspension, but the R model has springs suspension. The 0370R was intended for intercity use while 0370RS and 0370RSD were intended for longer-distance trips.

== Usage ==
Twelve were ordered by a transit company in Cariacica named Viaçao Aguia Branca. A bus tour company in Sao Paulo named Royal Bus also used them.
