= Mercedes-Benz buses =

German manufacturer of buses and coaches

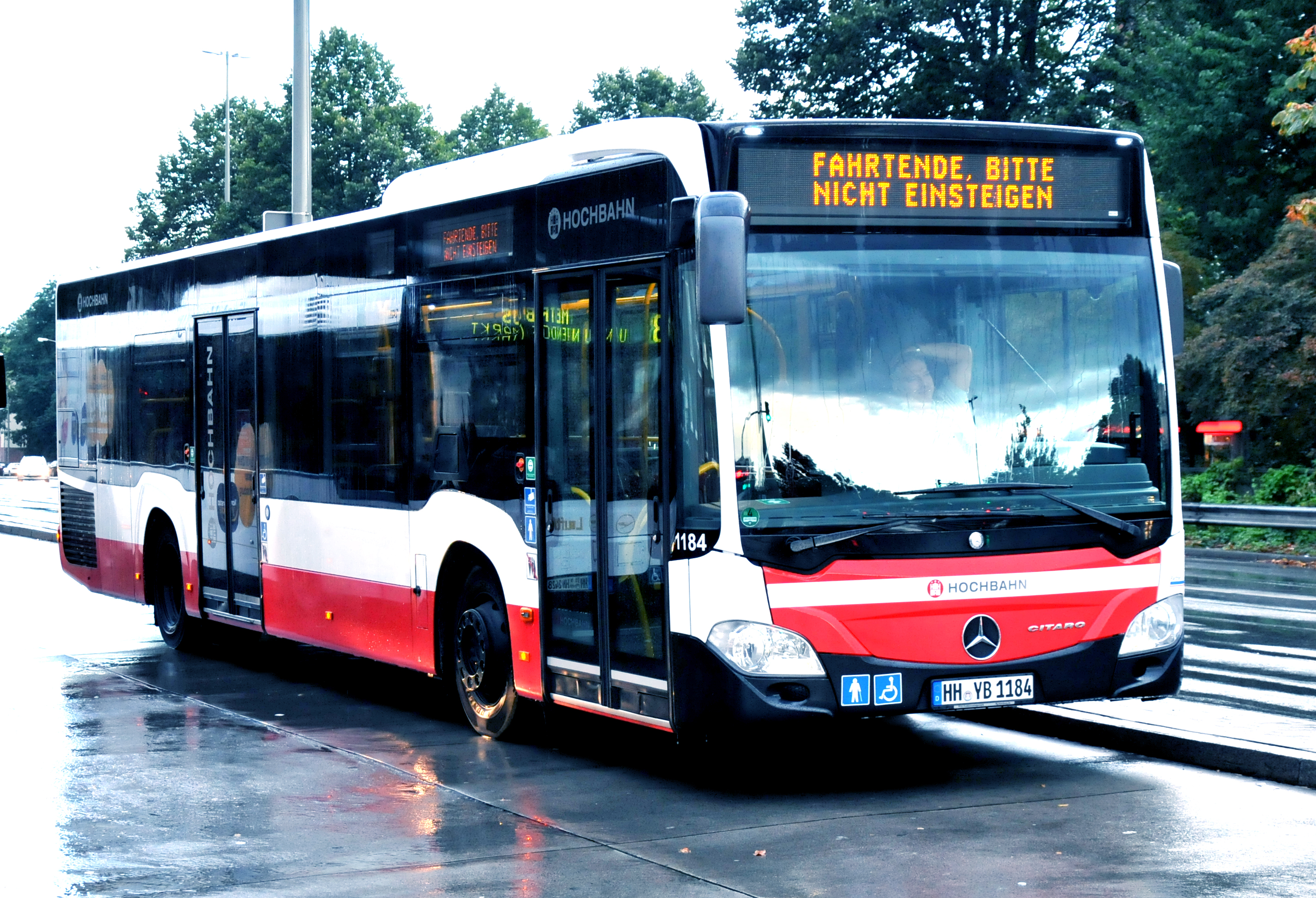
The new Mercedes-Benz Citaro presented in 2011

Mercedes-Benz has been producing buses since 1895 in Mannheim in Germany. Since 1995 Mercedes-Benz buses and coaches are known by the brand name of Daimler Buses (formerly EvoBus GmbH), a wholly owned subsidiary of Daimler Truck.

== Heritage ==
The world's first motorised bus was built in Germany by Karl Benz in 1895, some years before Gottlieb Daimler also started to build and sell buses in Germany as well. By 1898, both Karl Benz and Gottlieb Daimler, then rivals, were exporting their buses to Wales and England. Soon, Daimler products were sold in the British Empire in a partnership with the British company Milnes. Milnes-Daimler developed a double-decker in 1902 and provided a bus for the first motorised bus service in the United Kingdom the following year. Though the company met success in selling buses throughout the British Empire, the partnership between Daimler and Milnes had to be undone due to the First World War.

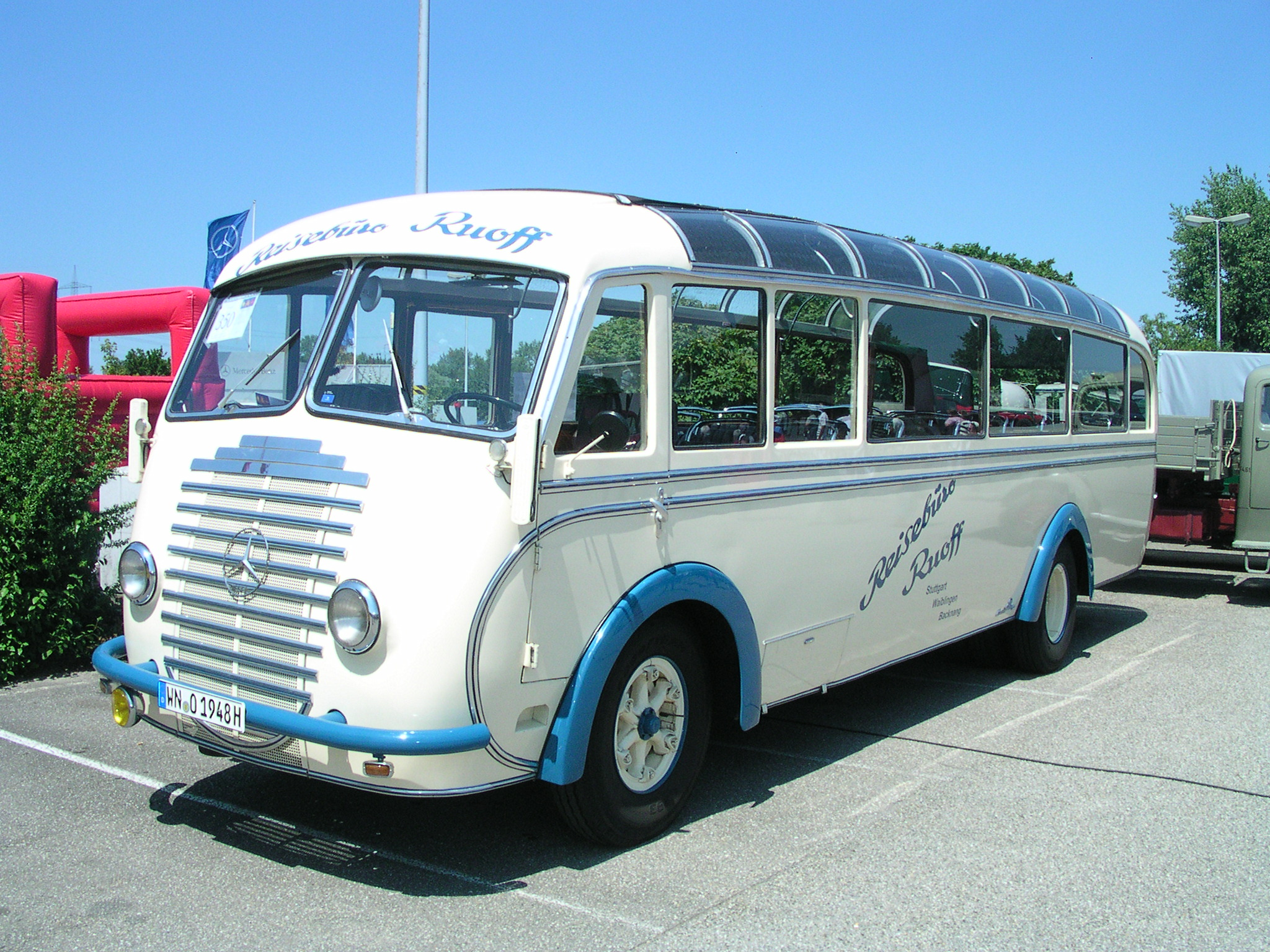
1948 Mercedes-Benz OP3750 forward control coach

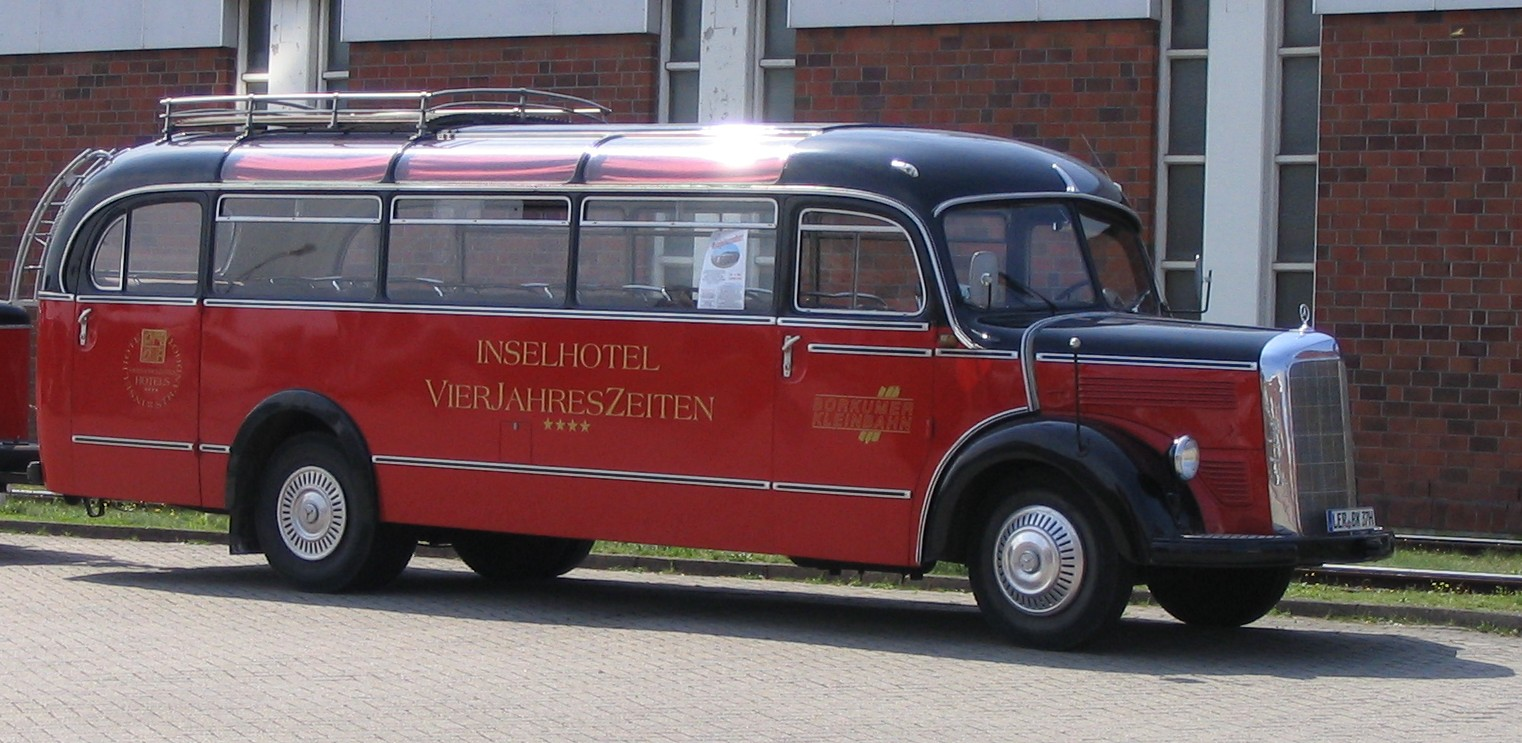
The Mercedes-Benz O 3500 touring coach based on the L 3500 truck

Due to economic hardships in the early 1900s, Daimler Motoren Gesellschaft and Benz & Cie. merged into one company in 1926, two years after both companies signed an agreement of mutual interest. Thus, Daimler-Benz AG (also known as Mercedes-Benz) was formed. In the next year, the company presented its first combined bus range. By that time, emphasis was given to diesel engines (as opposed to petrol engines) for commercial vehicles.

In 1951, Mercedes-Benz unveiled its first bus specifically designed for bus operation (and not derived from a lorry, as was the case of the other buses produced by the company until then) – the O6600 H. This 11-metre-long vehicle was equipped with a six-cylinder, transverse-mounted rear engine, delivering 145 hp, a lower frame than its predecessors, and an electric gearshift system.

In 1954, Mercedes-Benz unveiled its first semi-integral bus – the O321 H. The semi-integral design meant a reduction in weight, improvements in stability and body resistance. The O321 H also was the first to feature coil springs in the front-axle suspension. This 9.2-metre-long vehicle (a 10.9-metre version was later unveiled) also featured a rear-mounted engine. The first version was available with an output of 110 hp, and a later optional 126-hp version was made available. More than 30,000 units of the O321 H complete bus and its platform were sold around the world, a mark which places it as the best-selling bus of its time and, until today, one of the most successful models by Mercedes-Benz.

== Mercedes-Benz do Brasil Ltda. (Buses) ==
In the year 1951, technicians from Daimler Benz, accompanied by Brazilian specialists, carried out studies to analyse the viability of producing vehicles in Brazil. Two years later, on 7 October 1953, Mercedes-Benz do Brasil was officially founded, having as its first president Alfred Jurzykowski. A plant was then built in São Bernardo do Campo (a city neighbour to São Paulo city) in São Paulo State. On 28 September 1956 the plant was inaugurated in the presence of the then President of Brazil, Juscelino Kubitschek. This date marks the birth of the Brazilian vehicle industry.

Until 1958, only lorries were produced in the Brazilian plant, and local body builders used lorry chassis to make buses. In 1958, the integral bus Mercedes-Benz O321 H also began local production, supplying the local market as well as the market of other South American countries (although some Latin-American operators also bought European-made Mercedes-Benz buses). For instance, 550 units of Brazilian-made O321 integral buses were exported to Argentina in 1961, and another 300 units were exported to Venezuela in 1965.

In 1963, a front-engine bus chassis was unveiled, based on the LP 321 lorry. New versions of this chassis as well as new versions of the O 321 integral bus were presented the following year. The first integral bus tailored to the Brazilian market was the O 326, a rear-engine coach unveiled in 1966. It featured the turbo-charged OM 326 engine delivering up to 200 hp. One year later, a new front-engine bus chassis was also unveiled – the LPO 344, also based on a lorry chassis.

In 1969, a new rural- and urban-service bus was presented by Mercedes-Benz do Brasil. Designated O 352, this integral bus was equipped with a direct-injection diesel engine. Two new front-engine chassis were presented that same year – the LPO 1113 and the LPO 1520.

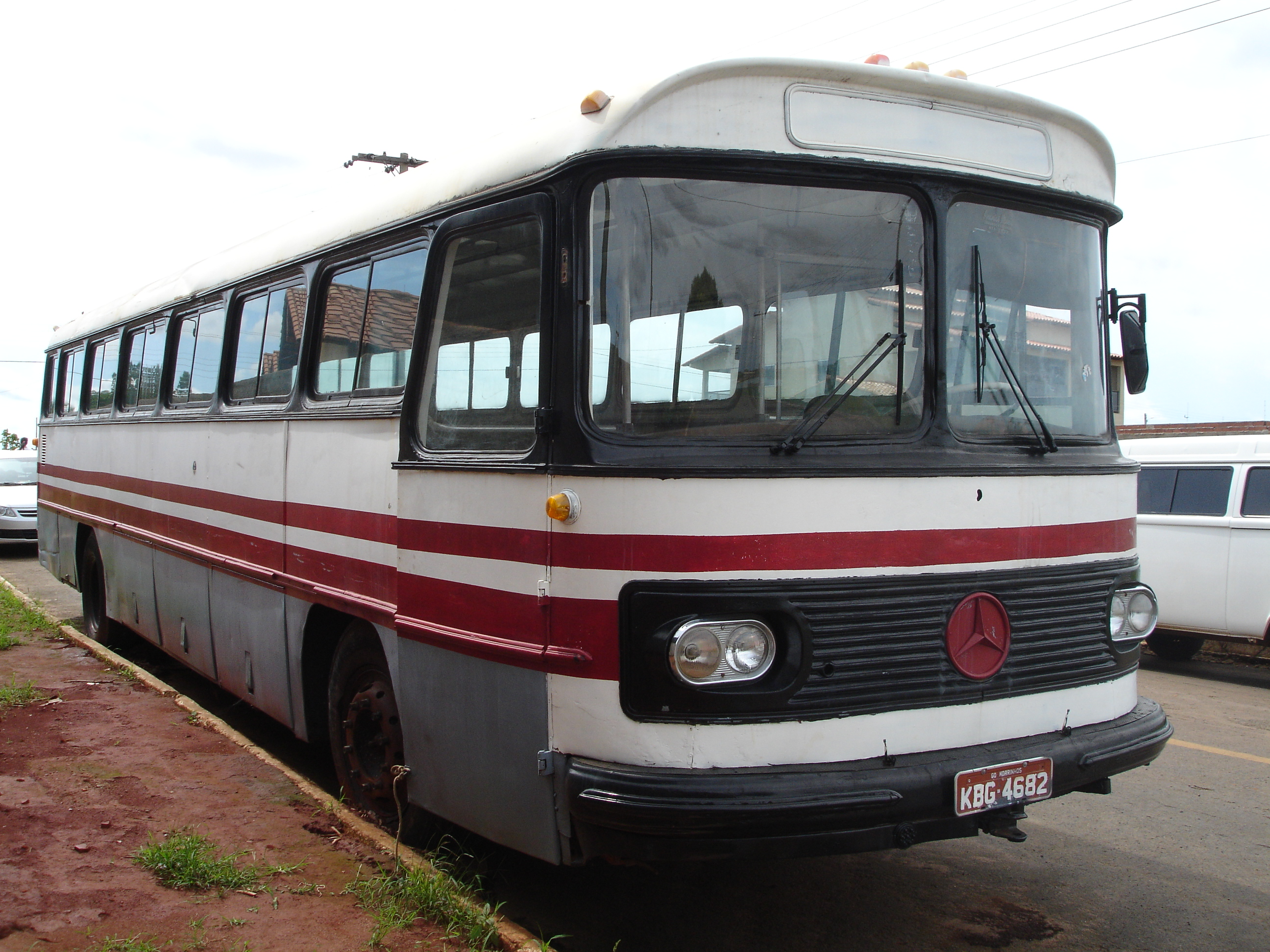
Mercedes-Benz O-355 1978 in Brazil

During the 1970s the plant in São Bernardo do Campo was being expanded to meet with the increasing demand for the production of commercial vehicles. By the end of that decade, Mercedes-Benz had produced more than 500,000 commercial vehicles in the Brazilian plant, about 4,000 of which were integral buses.

In 1970, the rear-engine OH 1313 and the front-engine OF 1313 bus chassis were unveiled. One year later, a new integral coach was unveiled – the O 362 – featuring a larger luggage compartment than its predecessor, the O 321. Yet another integral bus was presented by Mercedes-Benz do Brasil – the O 355 – in 1974. The OH 1517 rear-engine chassis was also presented that year. One year after the first three-axle bus was built in Brazil (based on the Mercedes-Benz LPO 1113 front-engine chassis) made its debut in 1977, the new O 364 integral bus was presented by Mercedes-Benz do Brasil in two versions – one with a 130-hp engine, and the other with a 170-hp engine. Also in 1978 the production of the O 362 was discontinued, after more than 35,100 units were produced in Brazil.

Since the demand for buses was growing by that time, a new plant was inaugurated in Campinas (a city in São Paulo State, Brazil), dedicated only for the production of buses. This plant was considered the biggest and most modern plant dedicated for the production of buses in the Western World. Meanwhile, the plant in São Bernardo do Campo was still being expanded.

In 1984, two new integral bus range were presented by Mercedes-Benz do Brasil. One of them was O 370 coach range, available in two- and three-axle versions. It was the first coach range produced by Mercedes-Benz do Brasil fitted with air suspension as standard. The other was the O 365 regular-service bus range. In 1987, the O 370 and O 365 bus ranges were succeeded by the O 371 range (made up by three coaches and three regular-service bus models).

In 1991, the company inaugurates the Centro de Desenvolvimento Tecnológico (or Technological Development Centre in English) in Brazil. This is, until today, the largest of its kind in Latin America. Some of the projects developed by the Centro de Desenvolvimento Tecnológico in Brazil were the natural gas engine M-447 hLAG, used in the natural-gas-powered Citaro, and the cost-effective improvements made in the Axor truck worldwide.

In 1994, Mercedes-Benz do Brasil presented the O 400 integral bus range, which included one standardised city bus, four coaches and the O 400 UPA articulated bus – the first articulated bus produced by Mercedes-Benz in Brazil, which came into production only in 1995. This vehicle featured an electronic-managed articulation developed by the company. In that same year, Mercedes-Benz reached an 85%-share in the commercial vehicles market in Brazil. In the following year, Mercedes-Benz do Brasil received the ISO 9001 and the VBA 6.1 certifications.

In 1996, a new version of the O 371 integral bus for regular-service operation was presented. However, months later Mercedes-Benz announced the end of integral bus production in Brazil. A statement was made in which the company announced it would henceforth focus on the production and development of bus chassis and platforms, and so it occurred. Bus production was relocated in the São Bernardo do Campo plant in 2000, when the Campinas industrial complex was dedicated for activities related to training and overseeing the dealership network in Brazil, parts and accessories distribution and technical assistance.

In 2006, DaimlerChrysler do Brasil unveiled two new articulated modular bus chassis – the O 500 MA (raised floor) and the O 500 UA (low-floor). Both are equipped with a six-cylinder-rear-mounted engine delivering 360 hp as standard. Units of the O 500 articulated bus range were purchased to operate in the BRT systems of Curitiba, São Paulo, Santiago de Chile (Transantiago) and Bogotá (Transmilenio).

Nowadays (2014), under the umbrella of Mercedes-Benz do Brasil Ltda., the bus chassis produced by Mercedes-Benz in Brazil supply the Brazilian market and are exported for countries in the Americas, the Middle East, Africa and Asia. Amongst the buses produced by Mercedes-Benz in Brazil are the O 500 modular bus chassis series, which includes chassis made for urban and rural applications (available in raised- and low-floor versions) as well as coach chassis, the OH rear-engine bus chassis series, the OF front-engine bus chassis series and the LO mini- and micro-bus chassis series.

== Mercedes-Benz Argentina ==
In 1951 the then Daimler-Benz AG set up in Argentina its first factories outside Germany: one in the town of San Martín, near Buenos Aires, and another in González Catán on industrial suburbs. The San Martin plant was closed at the end of the 1950s.

Mercedes-Benz released updated local colectivo based on modified L 3500 truck chassis – LO3500, OP3500, LO311, LO312– with a separately manufactured body fitted at a later stage by different coach builders. The LO312 was the first Mercedes-Benz bus front chassis manufactured in Argentina

In 1963 Mercedes built the 10,000th colectivo (model LO312), and continued with other models, such as LO1112, (120 HP), LA1112 4x4 (traction in all wheels) and the LO1114. Due to the family relationship with the truck, the Mercedes-Benz colectivos had a diesel engine with power transmitted to the rear axle by a five-speed constant-mesh gearbox.

In 1967, manufacture of the middle-distance buses of self-supporting platform O120 began. In 1968 the O120 was replaced by the model O140 with a 130-hp engine.

With the L 608D, in 1970 was made in the Virrey del Pino factory the bus version: the LO 608D (until mid-1980s) and the LFu 608 variant.

In 1977, mass production of chassis for buses and buses with power steering began. Manufacturing of the LO914 and the O170, the successor to the O140 model with the OM 352 A supercharged engine with 156 hp and reinforced axles and suspension, also started.

In 1979, the company began the production of the bus chassis, front model, OC 1214, using the OM 352 engine like the LO 1114 bus.

In 1981, with some success, the OH 1419 bus was introduced and made in Argentina.

In 1982, the company built the first bus powered by compressed natural gas (CNG) in Argentina and launched two new models: the front-engine OF 1114 (not available in Argentina, just for export markets only, like Perú) and the OF 1214, with a front engine. Also introduced was a new line of vehicles for urban transport of passengers, automatic transmission for the LO1114, the new front chassis and bus chassis rear engine OH 1314, with and without automatic transmission. Series production of the LO 1114 with automatic gearbox began and joined the air brake system on the Mercedes-Benz model LO 1114.

In 1987, Mercedes-Benz Argentina revolutionized the public transportation of passengers by launching the new line of rear-engined front-side bus (the "OH"), which replaced traditional front motor buses. With also the OH 1318 and OH 1418.

For the first years of the 1990s, arrives the buses of the O-series likes the O 373 RSD (324 units built), the O 374 RSD (72 units built) and the O 400 RSD (61 units built) for the long-distance bus routes and also the OH 1522 (333 units built) and the OH 1526 (98 units built). All made in the factory of González Catán until 1995. In 1994, start the assembly of the OF 1620 with the 200HP diesel engine with 6606 units made and large used in the provinces like Santa Fe, Jujuy and others.

For the urban buses, the OHL series added with the production line in 1990 with this models: OH/OHL 1316, OH/OHL 1320 and the OH/OHL 1420 with success in the urban transport.

In 1997, the Argentinian market receive the local-made OH 1521L-Sb, OH 1621 L and in 1999 OH 1721L-Sb.

After the 2001 crisis, develops many "colectivos" like the OH 1115 and OH 1315 (except the case in 2002, when industrialized the production of the OH 1721, a bus with a 210HP engine), medium urban buses with a 150 HP engine. This models made and sold until 2008, replaced in 2009 by the new OH 1618L-Sb and the OH 1718, a local develop for Mercedes-Benz Argentina under the chassis of the OH 1618. The OH 1618 is ready to meet the highest requirements on emissions, Euro 3, 4 and 5. Has the renowned Mercedes-Benz OM 904 LA Euro 3 of a high torque: 675 Nm, a power of 177 hp DIN. The engine electronic management and 3 valves per cylinder, with the optional Top Brake system to improve vehicle efficiency and durability of the brake system. Optionally provides two types of gearbox: automatic and mechanical. The front and rear axles are developed, tested and manufactured by Mercedes-Benz, especially technology adopted and adapted to the needs of passenger transport: low velocity, starting and numerous arrests per kilometer, with extensive use of systems Brake and manageability of the unit.

Also in 2008, when the OF 1417 stopped the production and the OF 1418 are a popular chassis bus, Mercedes-Benz Argentina S.A. determine the assembly of the mentioned OF 1418 until 2015.

Today it builds modern-style buses and several models of bus chassis and Mercedes-Benz Sprinter delivery vans, chassis cabs and minibuses with a large slice of them being exported to Germany. Mercedes-Benz commuter and touring buses are not necessarily up to European counterparts but robust enough to handle heavy urban usage and some of Argentina's rugged backcountry and extra long-distance travel. For 2012, was return the production of the Sprinter NCV3, the successor of the T1N with many Argentinian-made parts and it's exported to the Mercosur, South Africa and other markets.

In 2013, announced the assembly of the minibus LO 915 in the Virrey del Pino plant with the high floor rear engine (OH) chassis OH 1518 previously imported from Brazil the two models. Also, other models like the OF 1722 were nazionalizated for Argentinian market.

Since November 2015, announced the new local-made models, like the OH 1621 and OH 1721. All are involved in the Euro V emission standards, obligatory since January 2016. Other models under the Euro V standard are the OF 1519, OF 1621 and OF 1721 and OF 1724.

== Mercedes-Benz Türk ==
Daimler AG is currently manufacturing buses and coaches under the Mercedes-Benz brand in Turkey. Mercedes-Benz Türk was established in Istanbul in 1967 as Otomarsan, and it started the production of the O 302 type buses in 1968.

In 1970, only two years after its foundation, the company started to export buses, over 12,600 buses being exported to date. In 1984, the company was appointed as the general representative of Mercedes-Benz in Turkey, added with new partners to the enterprise, and started a new investment necessary for production of trucks. In 1986, parallel to the growth potential of Turkey, the truck plant started production in Aksaray. In November 1990, the company name was changed to Mercedes-Benz Türk A.Ş.

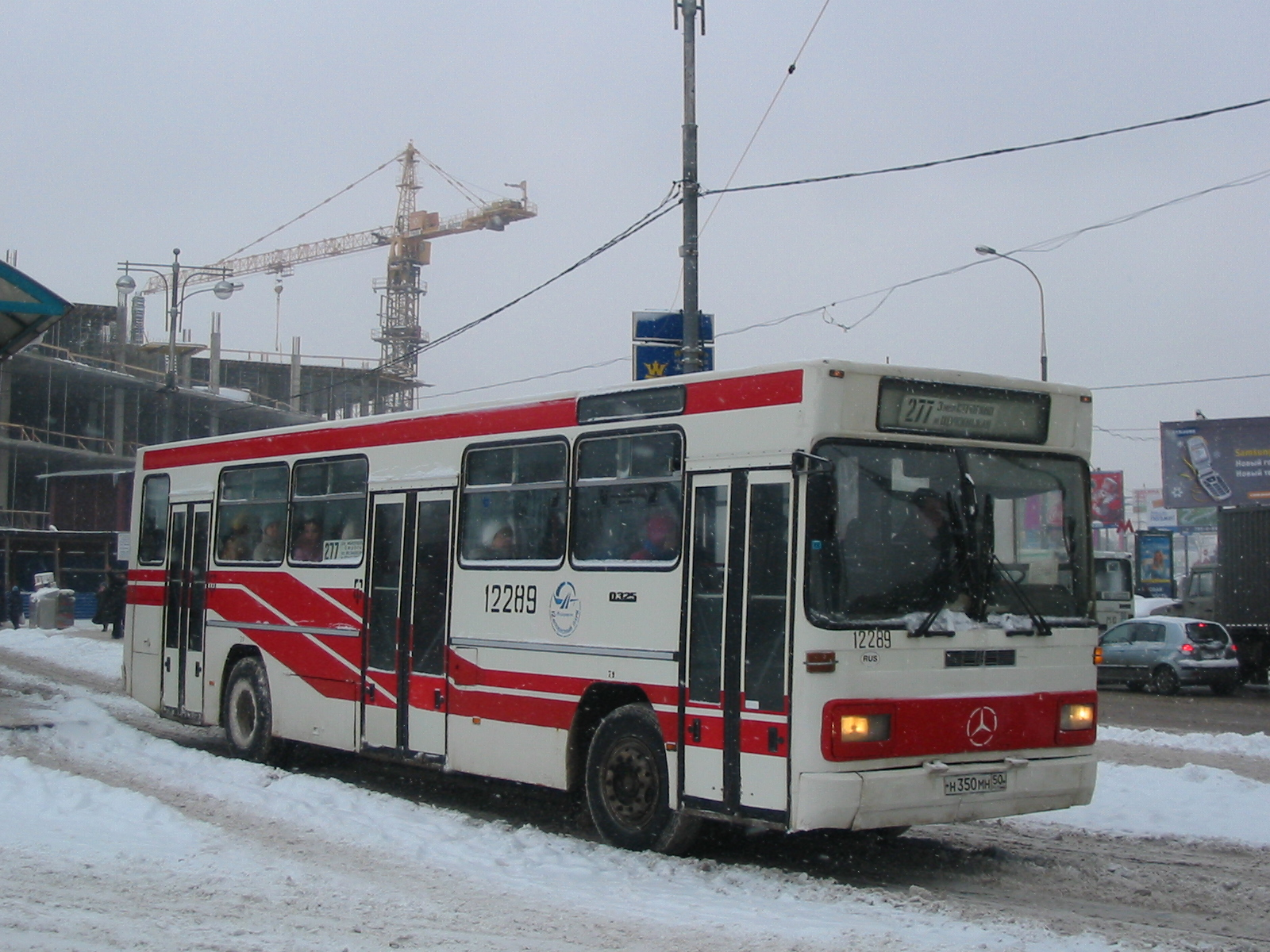
Mercedes-Benz Türk O 325 in Moscow

The company is one of the biggest foreign direct investments in Turkey (with a total investment volume of €807 million) and employs more than 5.000 personnel. Due to increasing export activities, Mercedes-Benz Türk built a new bus plant in Hoşdere, Istanbul, which became active in December 1994.

Since its foundation, Mercedes-Benz Türk has sold more than 75,000 buses (from Hoşdere only), 215,000 trucks and 1,000 midibuses from its own production, in addition to 20,000 cars since 1989, when the company started the importation of passenger cars. Mercedes-Benz Türk currently produces intercity (the Travego, Intouro and Tourismo) and municipality buses (the Conecto) at the Hoşdere, Istanbul plant, and light and heavy duty trucks (MB800, Actros, Axor, Atego, and the Unimog) at the Aksaray plant.

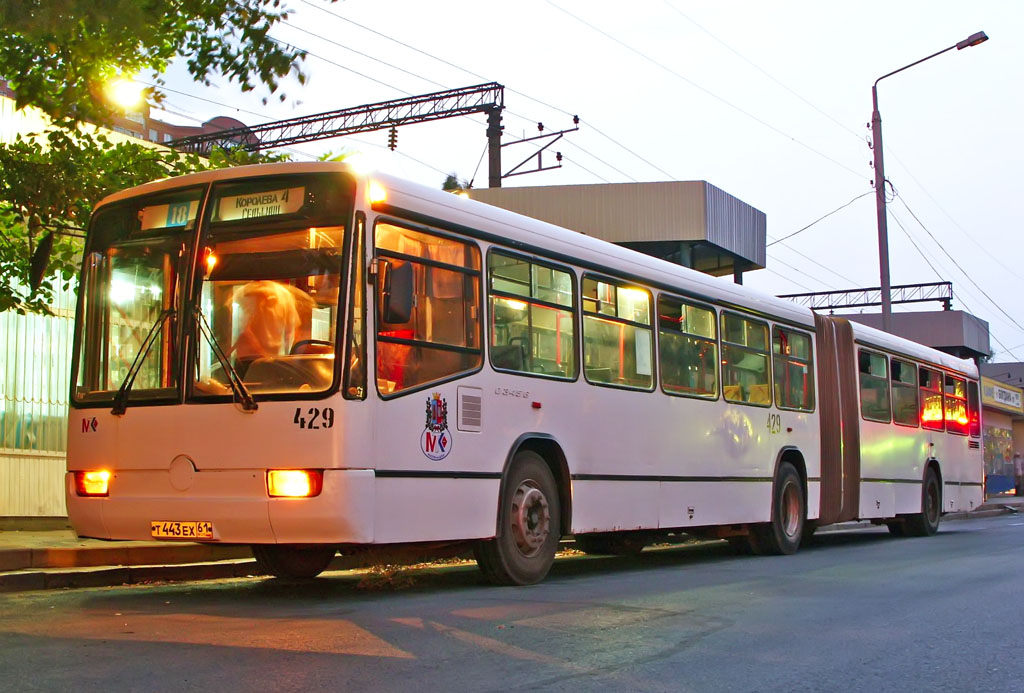
Mercedes-Benz Türk O 345 G in Rostov, Russia.

Mercedes-Benz Türk is the first company in the Turkish primary automotive industry to get the ISO 9002 quality certificate, obtained in 1994 for the Aksaray plant, and ISO 9001 quality certificate, obtained in 1995 for the Davutpaşa, Istanbul and Hoşdere, Istanbul production plants.

Furthermore, Mercedes-Benz Türk has the certificate ISO 14001 for environment management standards since May 2000 and the certificates ISO 9001:2000 and ISO 16949 since March 2002.

== Mercedes-Benz and the VÖV ==
During the 1960s, the Verband Deutscher Verkehrsunternehmen (or German Association for Public Transport Operations in English) conducted a project of a highly standardised and specialised bus, to improve the quality, simplify the maintenance and reduce the production costs of buses in Germany – the VÖV-I. Based on the recommendations provided by the VDV, Mercedes-Benz unveiled the O305 regular-service bus in 1967. In 1973 the rural-service bus O307 was presented. It was based on the O305 and also conceived in line with the standards set by the VDV. In 1977, Mercedes-Benz presented a 17-metre-long articulated version of the O305 (the O305 G), featuring a rear-mounted engine.

By the end of the 1970s the project was improved and a VÖV-II standardised bus range was presented. Mercedes-Benz again took part in the project and in 1980 presented the "S80" standardised regular-service bus. After minor changes were made, the Mercedes-Benz S80 came into production in 1984 as the O405, succeeding the O305. In the following year, an articulated (O405 G) and a rural-service version (O407) were unveiled.

== EvoBus ==
In 1995 Daimler-Benz Bus and Coach range and Kässbohrer Bus Division were combined to form the EvoBus GmbH. Both Mercedes-Benz and Setra continued to operate separately on the market for some time.

One year later EvoBus was formed, the first of a new bus range from Mercedes-Benz was presented – the Integro (O550) rural-service bus, later joined by a three-axle 15-metre version. Besides the Integro, EvoBus also presented the Mercedes-Benz O405 NÜL (twin-axle long low-floor rural-service bus), O405 NK (compact city bus) and the Innovisia (an improved version of the O404). The Innovisia was the first bus to be equipped with an ABC suspension system. Shortly after the Citaro urban-service low-floor bus was unveiled. It was the first urban bus equipped with CAN data bus.

Coordinated production between Setra and Mercedes-Benz started in 1997. New versions of the Citaro low-floor bus were presented that year, including a 15-metre three-axle version and an 18-metre articulated version. In 1998 the new Mercedes-Benz Tourismo (O350) was presented in a super-high-deck version with three-axles, based on the O404 coach chassis. The O404 integral bus was succeeded by the Travego in 1999. The Travego was available either with a six-cylinder in-line engine (initially delivering 354 and 408 hp) or with a V8 engine (delivering 476 hp).

In the 17th edition of the Bus World exposition in Kortrijk (Belgium), Mercedes-Benz officially unveiled the Tourino – a 9,3-metre coach featuring automatic air suspension, disc brakes, ABS, EBS and ASR systems. There were two engine options (245 hp/279 hp), both six-cylinder rear-mounted engine.

The Citaro, Travego and Integro range were redeveloped by the end of 2005, and the CapaCity – a four-axle articulated low-floor bus 19.54-metre long – was unveiled in 2006. Also in 2006 the Tourismo was redeveloped, and a 14-metre version was presented. Amongst the innovations incorporated to the new Tourismo are the new engine output available (354 hp/408 hp/428 hp) and the new-generation transmissions available with EPS system.

Currently Mercedes-Benz concentrates the integral bus production in Germany and Turkey, and chassis production in Spain and Brazil. There are other manufacturing basis around the world, such as the ones in France and Argentina.

== Polomex ==
A joint-venture between Mercedes-Benz and Brazilian coachbuilder Marcopolo resulted in the formation of Polomex. The company assembles and sells urban buses and coaches with Mercedes-Benz chassis and Marcopolo body in Mexico. The coach range includes the Multego, a luxury coach based on the Mercedes-Benz OC500 modular bus chassis. The body, produced by Marcopolo, features a design similar to that of Mercedes-Benz Travego.

== Alternative drive ==
The earliest cited alternative-drive bus sold by Mercedes-Benz is the O6600 T, a trolleybus based on the O6600 H diesel bus. In the early 1950s, 350 German-made Mercedes-Benz trolleybuses were exported to Argentina.

Nonetheless, Mercedes-Benz engaged in intensive research and development of alternative propulsion systems in the 1960s. In 1969 the brand presented the OE302 electric bus. Two years later, a natural-gas-fuelled version of the O305 was unveiled, and in 1975 the OE302 duo bus went into trial operation in Esslingen, Germany. A minibus operated on pure hydrogen was demonstrated in 1977. In 1978 the hybrid electric OE305 was presented. The same year Mercedes-Benz do Brasil presented the OF-1315 front engine natural-gas-fuelled bus chassis for the Brazilian market. Other five duo buses went into trial operation in Esslingen the following year, two of them in battery/trolley operation and the other three in diesel/trolley operation. Also in 1979, Daimler-Benz sent a German-built O305 trolleybus to be tested on the São Paulo trolleybus system, Brazil, then one of the most extensive trolleybus systems in the western world. The O305 GT trolleybus would go into production in 1981. Also in 1981 a methanol-fuelled O305 was unveiled.

In 1983 methanol-drive Mercedes-Benz buses were tested in São Paulo, Brazil. Some time later, 40 natural-gas-fuelled Mercedes-Benz O364 rear-engine integral buses went into experimental operation in that city. Two of them used a mixture of soy oil, ethanol and B-Diesel as fuel. In the following year Mercedes-Benz do Brasil unveil the OH-1315, a natural-gas-fuelled rear-engine bus chassis, and the O371 integral bus range for the Brazilian market, including a natural-gas integral urban bus and a trolleybus. In 1986 experiments were made in Europe with an articulated duo bus (diesel/electric) based on the O405. The O405 trolleybus was presented in that same year.

In 1984, a trial was carried out with a four O305 buses already in use in Auckland, New Zealand, with two powered by liquid petroleum gas and two powered by compressed natural gas (CNG). At the same time, two Volvo B10M buses were converted to run on methanol. All six, as well as a further 50 O303 and O305 buses, were all put onto CNG. Auckland City had a fleet of one hundred O303 buses and three hundred O305 buses.

In the 1990s three new natural-gas-powered models were unveiled by Mercedes-Benz: the O405 GN GNG low-floor articulated bus, which was Europe's first natural gas low-floor city bus; the O405 NG solo city bus and the O405 ÜNG for rural service. All models were fitted with the M-447 hG engine that was exported from Brazil.

In 1994 a prototype of a low-floor articulated duo bus based on the O405 – the O405 GNTD – was presented, featuring electric hub motors.

In 1996 the OH-1315 natural-gas bus chassis is succeeded by the OH-1621 LG, also natural-gas-powered. One year later, the OH-1621 LG was equipped with an electronic-managed engine as standard.

In 1997 Daimler-Benz presented its first fuel-cell bus, designated NEBUS (New Electric Bus), based on the O405 urban bus. It was the world's first fully operational fuel-cell-powered bus. Another fuel-cell-powered was developed later, based on the Citaro. Exemplars of the Citaro Fuel Cell bus are currently being tested in Europe, China and Australia.

In 1998, the Cito (a diesel-electric midibus) was unveiled, featuring the low-floor concept.

In 2000, Mercedes-Benz do Brasil delivered the first 56 model M-447 hLAG turbocharged natural gas engines to the city of Hannover in Germany fitted to specially designed Citaro citybuses for EXPO 2000. Subsequently, this engine has sold in larger numbers compared to the previous M-447 hG engine, with over 600 ordered by Australian bus operators alone.

== Products ==
=== Minibuses ===
- Sprinter 1995–present
- Vario 1996–2013
- Medio 2000–2005
- LO Series 1932–present
- O309 1967–1986

=== Full-size buses ===
- LPO 322/457 1962-1966
- O317 1958–1977
- O321 1954–1970
- O322 1959–1964
- O326 1958–1969
- O302 1965–1974
- O303 1974–1992
- O305 & O305G 1969–1987
- O307 1973–1987
- O321 1954–1970
- O340 1992–1999
- O352 1960–1970
- O355 1972–1978
- O362 1975–1979
- O364 1979–1986
- O365 1984–1988
- O370R, O370RS, O370RSD 1984–1987
- O371U, O371UP, O371UL, O371R, O371RS, O371RSL, O371RSE and O371RSD 1980–1990
- O400UP, O400UPA, O400R, O400RS, O400RSL, O400RSE and O400RSD 1994–2001
- O404 1992–1999
- O405, O405G, O405N, O405GN, O405N2, O405GN2 and O405NH 1983–2001
- O407 1987–2001
- O408 1989–1999
- Conecto (O345) 2002–present
  - Second generation
- Tourismo (O350) 1994–present
- Tourino (O510) 2004–2013
- Cito (O520) 1999–2003
- Citaro (O530 series) 1997–present
- Integro (O550) 1996–2018
- Intouro (O560) 1999–present
- Travego (O580) 1999–present
- SHD 2016–present
- OC500RF 2542/2543/2546 raised-floor modular bus chassis (also known as O500RF, in the UK even available as a complete coach known as OC500 Touro) 2001–present
- OC500LE 1825h/1828h/1830h/1825hG/1830h euro 6 low-entry modular bus chassis (also known as O500LE, soon to be accompanied by an articulated version) 2001–present
- OC500LF/OC500LF (A) low-floor modular bus chassis 2001–present
- O500 M (1726/1826) (low floor modular bus chassis)
- O500 MA (2836) (low floor articulated modular bus chassis)
- O500 UDA (3736) (low floor articulated triple axles modular bus chassis)
- O500 R (1830) (in the Indonesia also known as "Osoor")
- O500 RS (1936/1938/1941/1942/1943)
- O500 RSD (2436/2441/2442/2443/2445/2448)
- O500 RSDD (2736/2741/2742/2743/2745)
- O500 U (1726/1826) low-entry modular bus chassis
- O500 UA (1930/2836) low-entry articulated modular bus chassis
- O500 UDA (3736) low-entry articulated triple axles modular bus chassis
- OF series front-engine bus 1982–present
- OH series rear-engine bus 1981–present
- CBC 1725/1726 2007-2009
- IBC 1830/1833/1836/2436/2442 2002-2007
- IBC 1632/1636/2036
- Tourrider (North American Exclusive Model) 2021–present

== Gallery ==
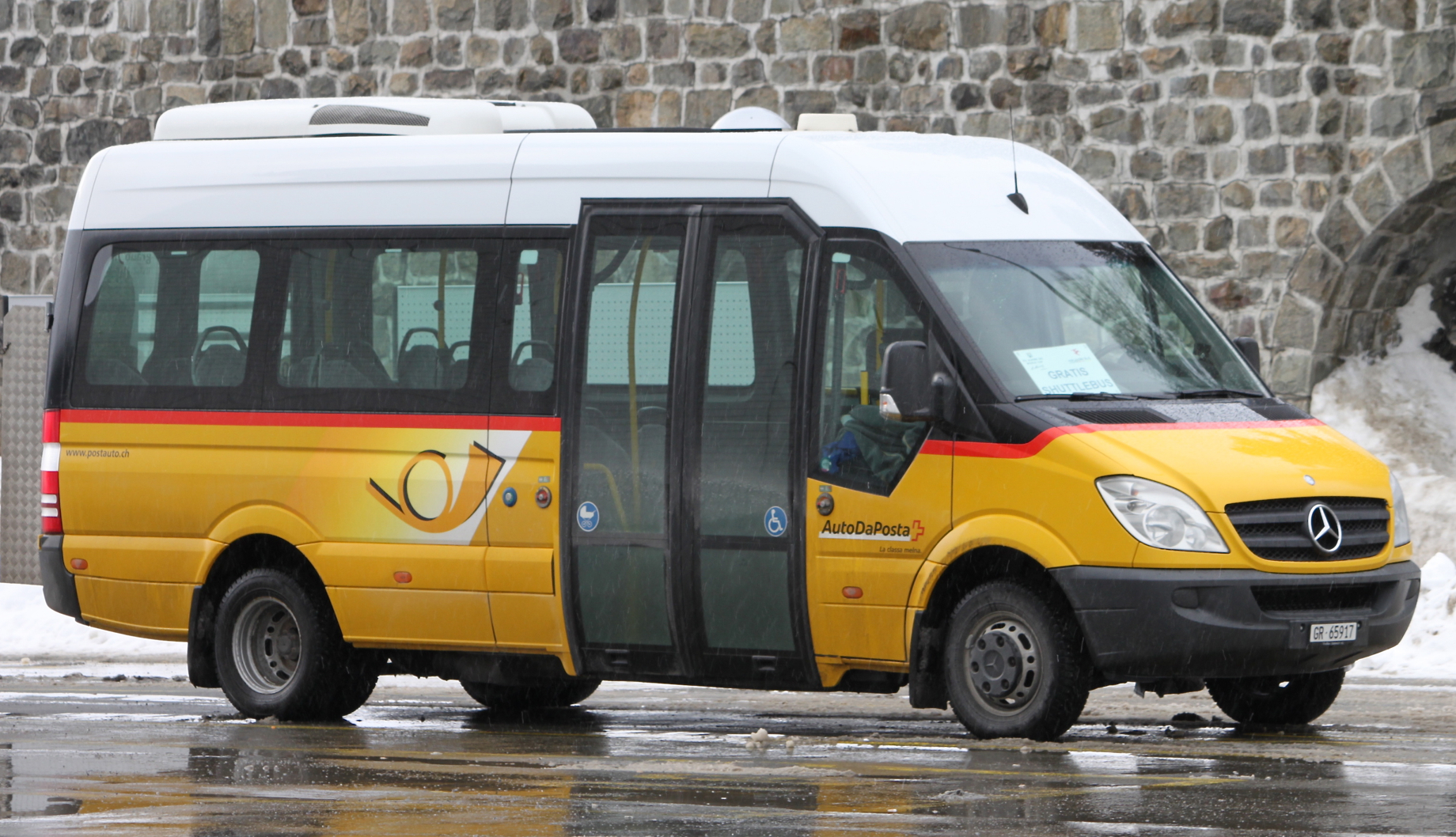
Mercedes-Benz Sprinter minibus.

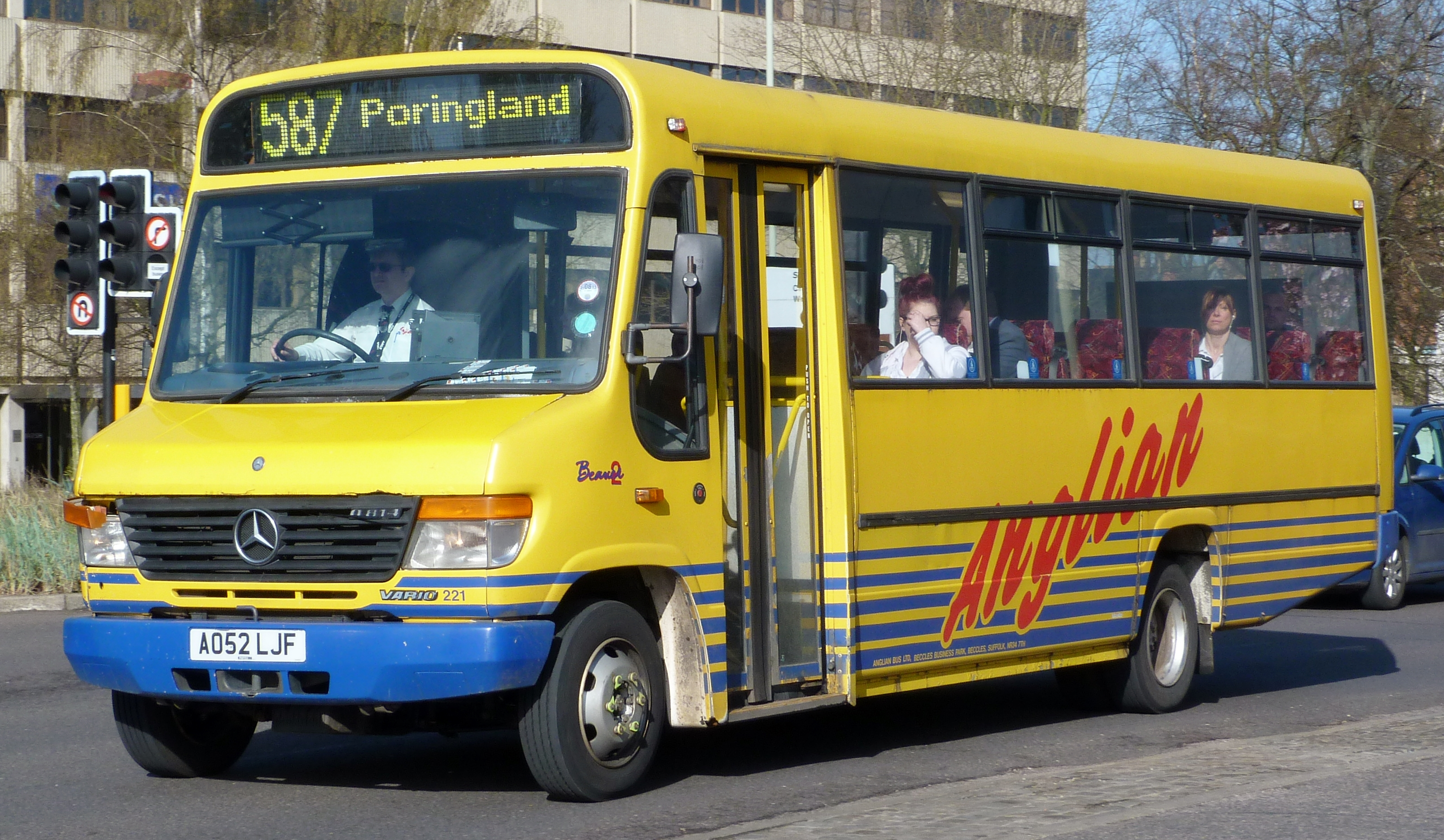
Plaxton Beaver 2 bodied Mercedes-Benz Vario minibus.

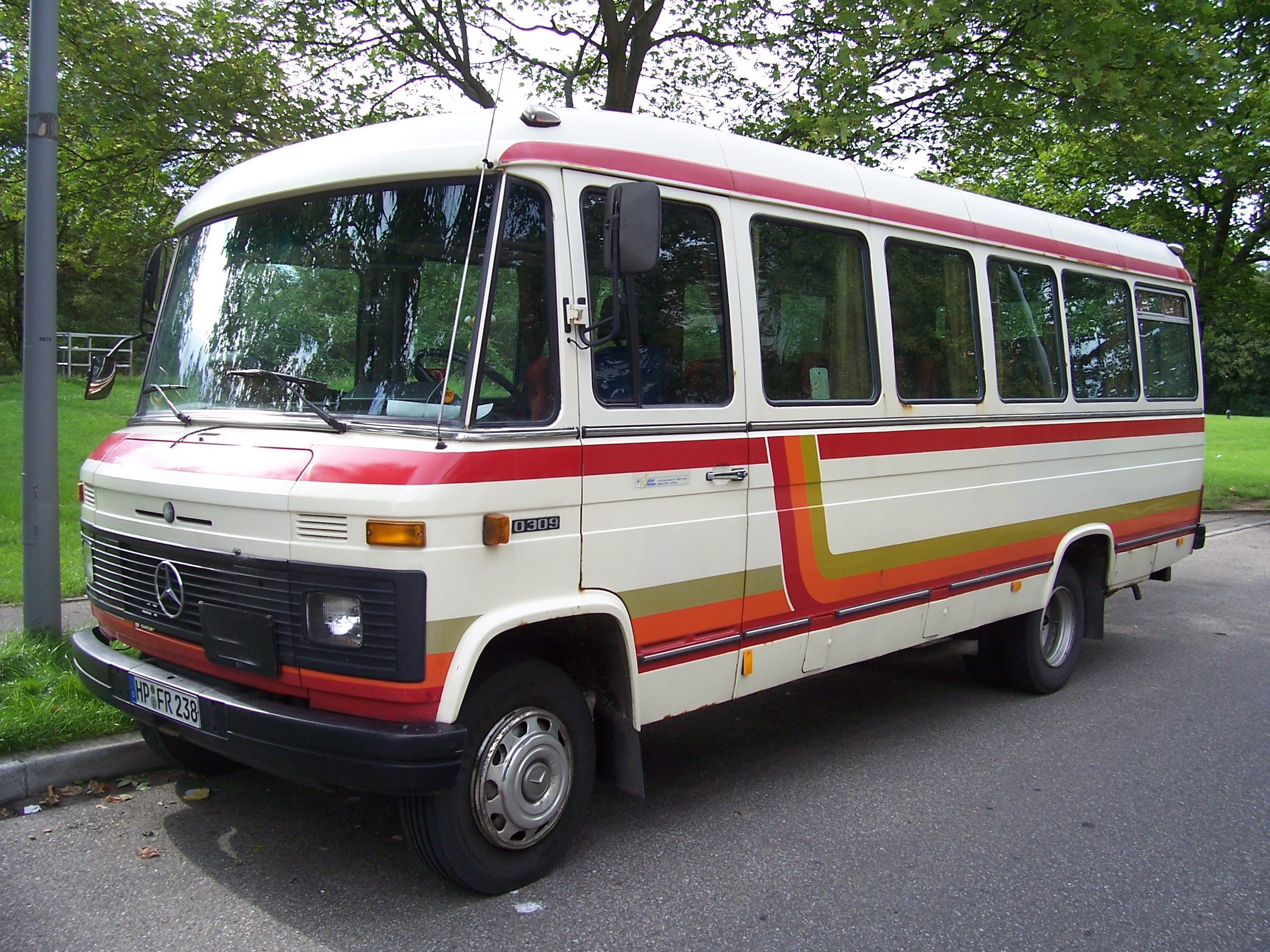
A 24-passenger version of the Mercedes-Benz O309.

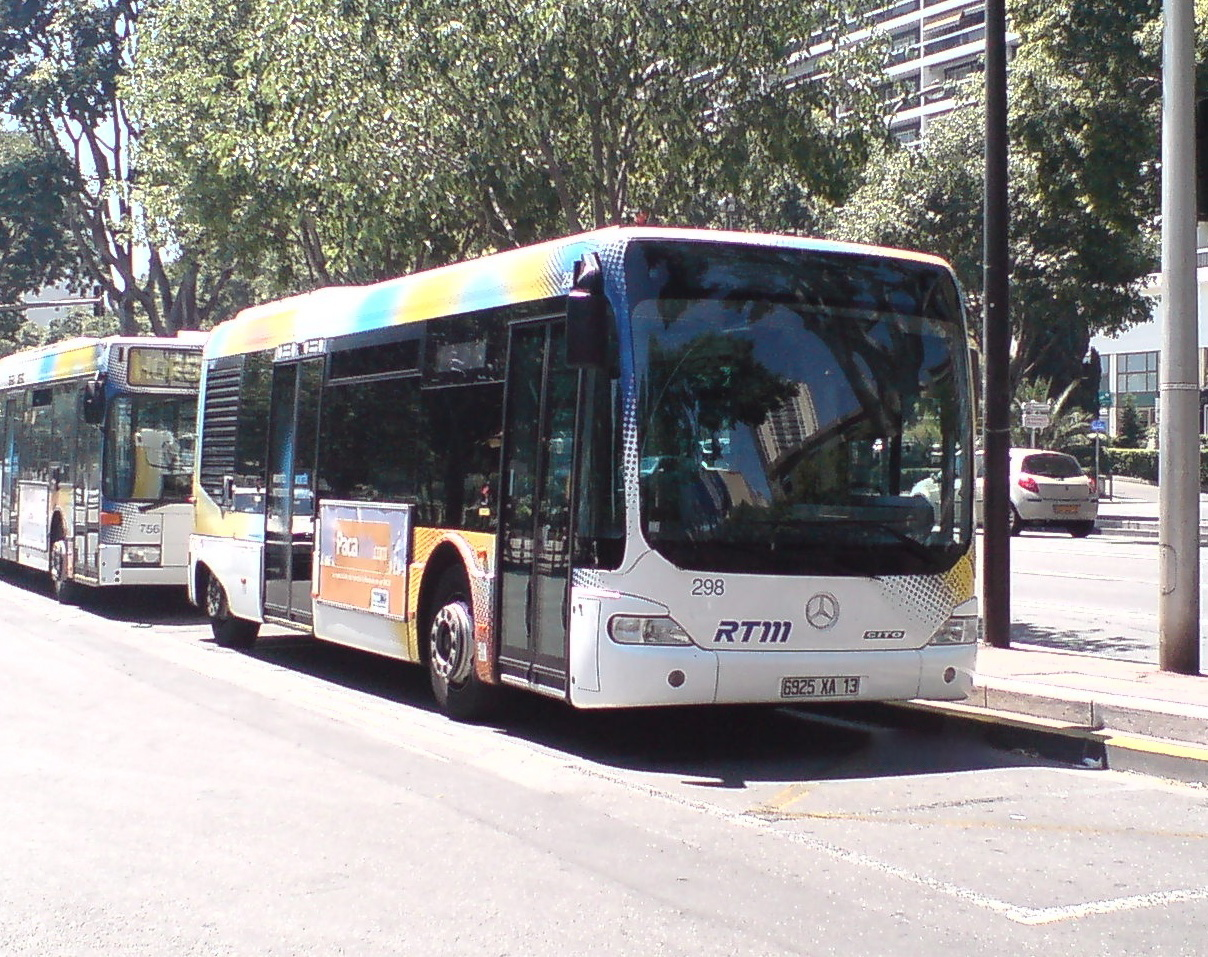
Mercedes-Benz Cito.

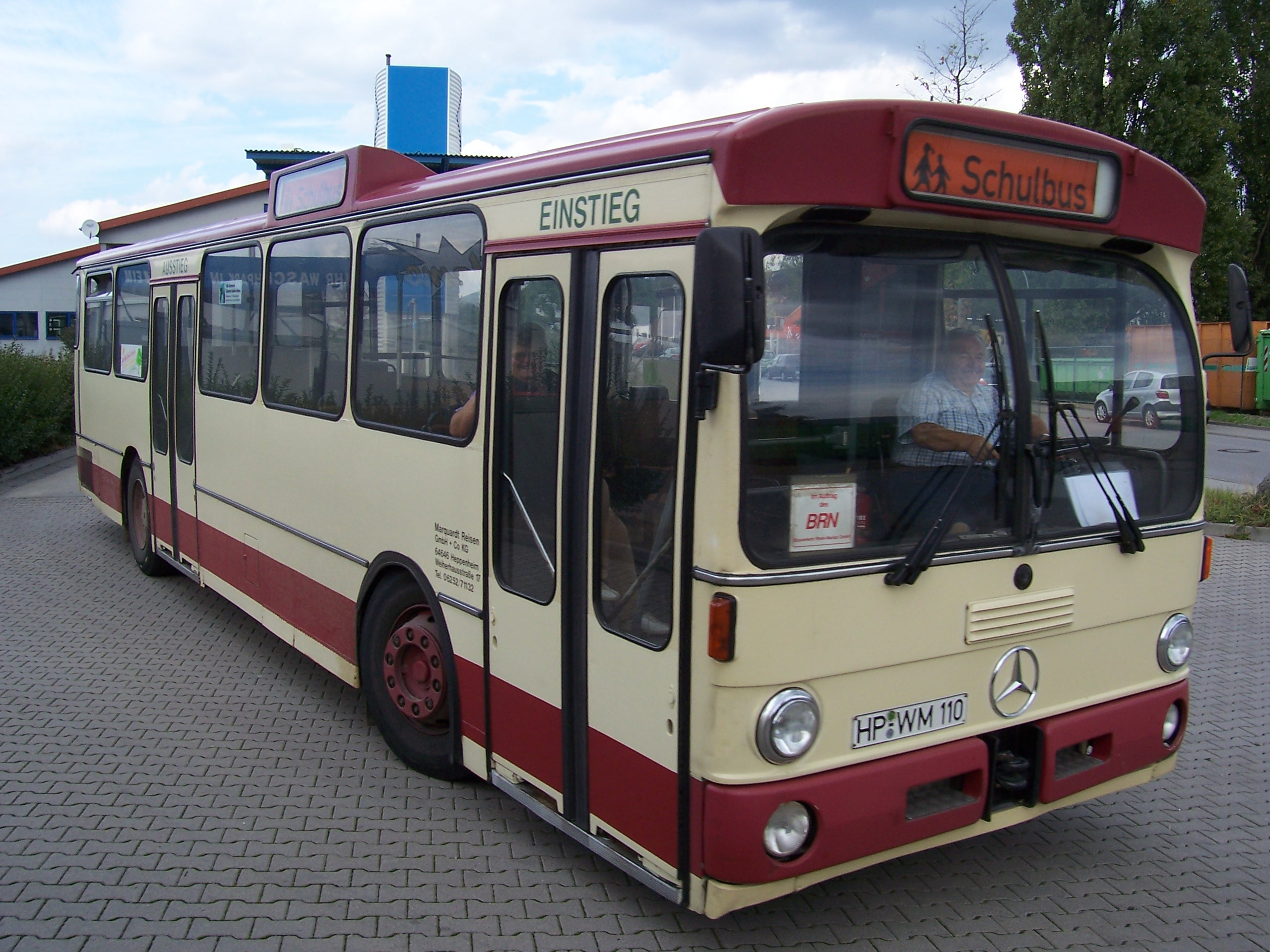
A VöV fronted Mercedes-Benz O305.

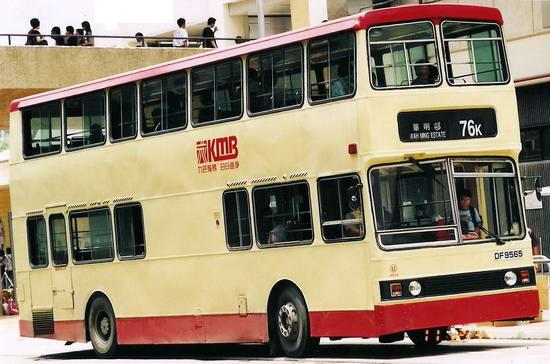
Kowloon Motor Bus 11-metre Mercedes-Benz O305 double-decker bus.

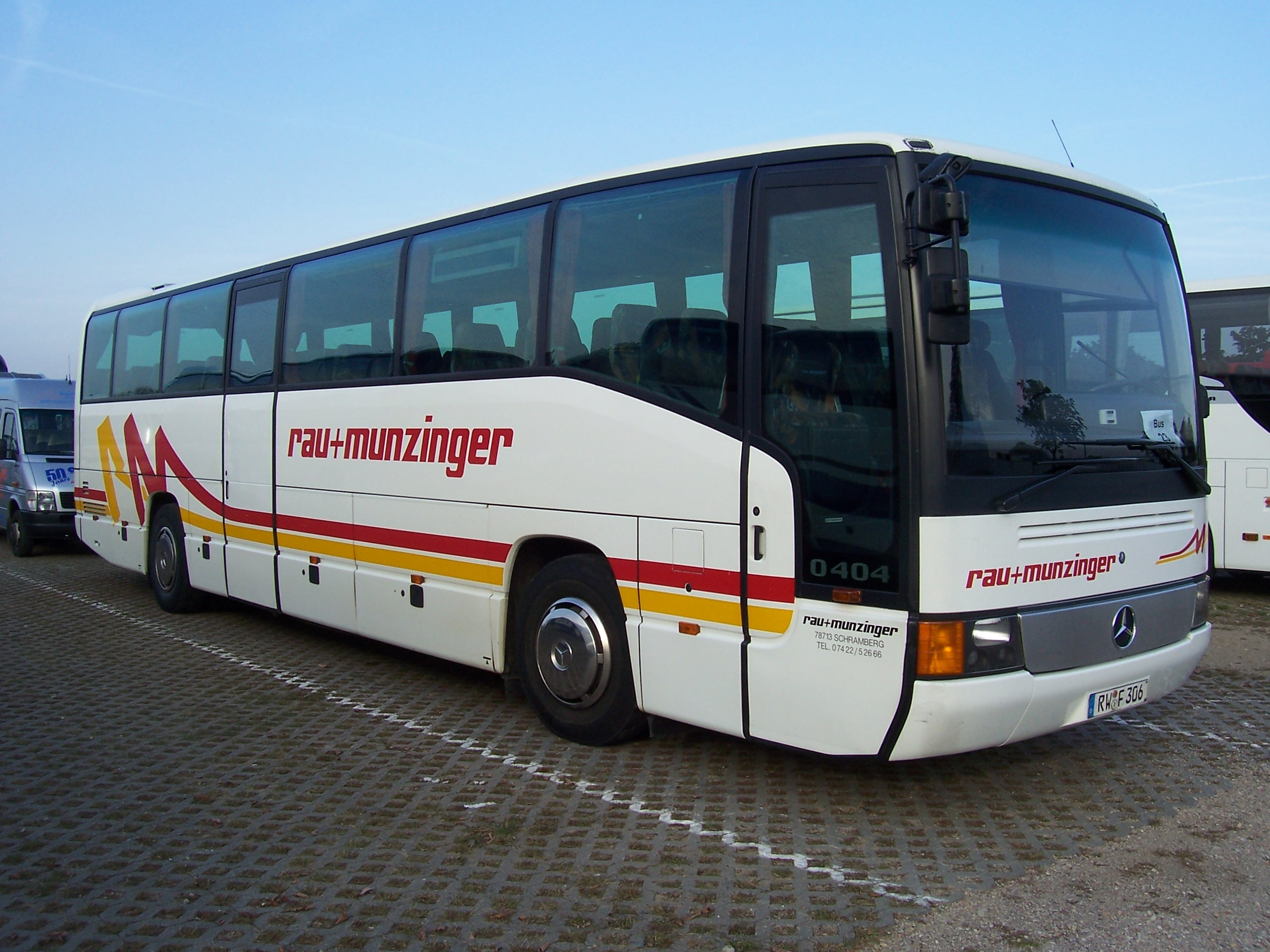
Mercedes-Benz O404

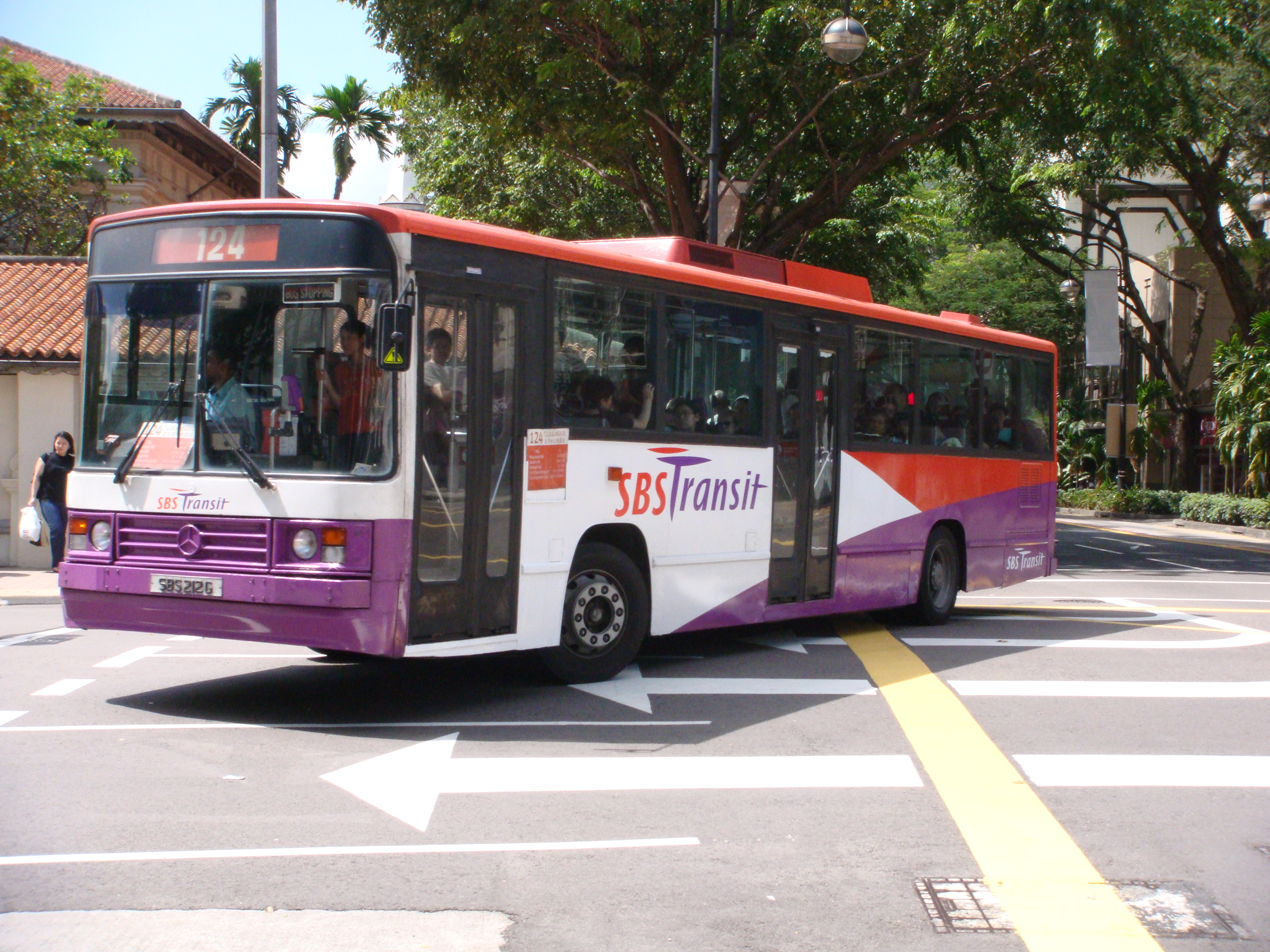
A SBS Transit Mercedes-Benz O405 in Singapore. Some buses have been exported to Bangkok.

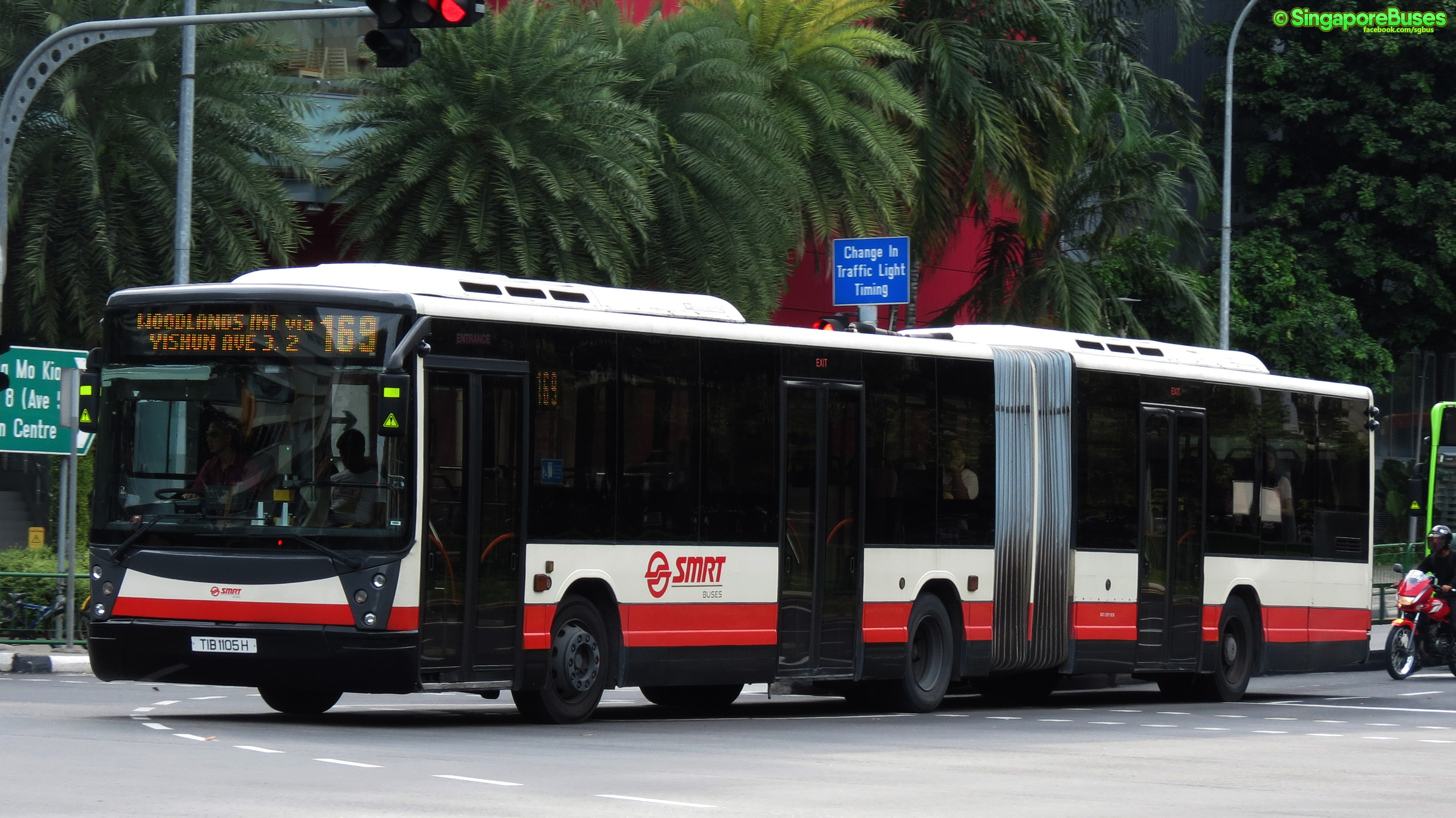
SMRT Mercedes-Benz O405G (Hispano Habit) articulated bus in Singapore.

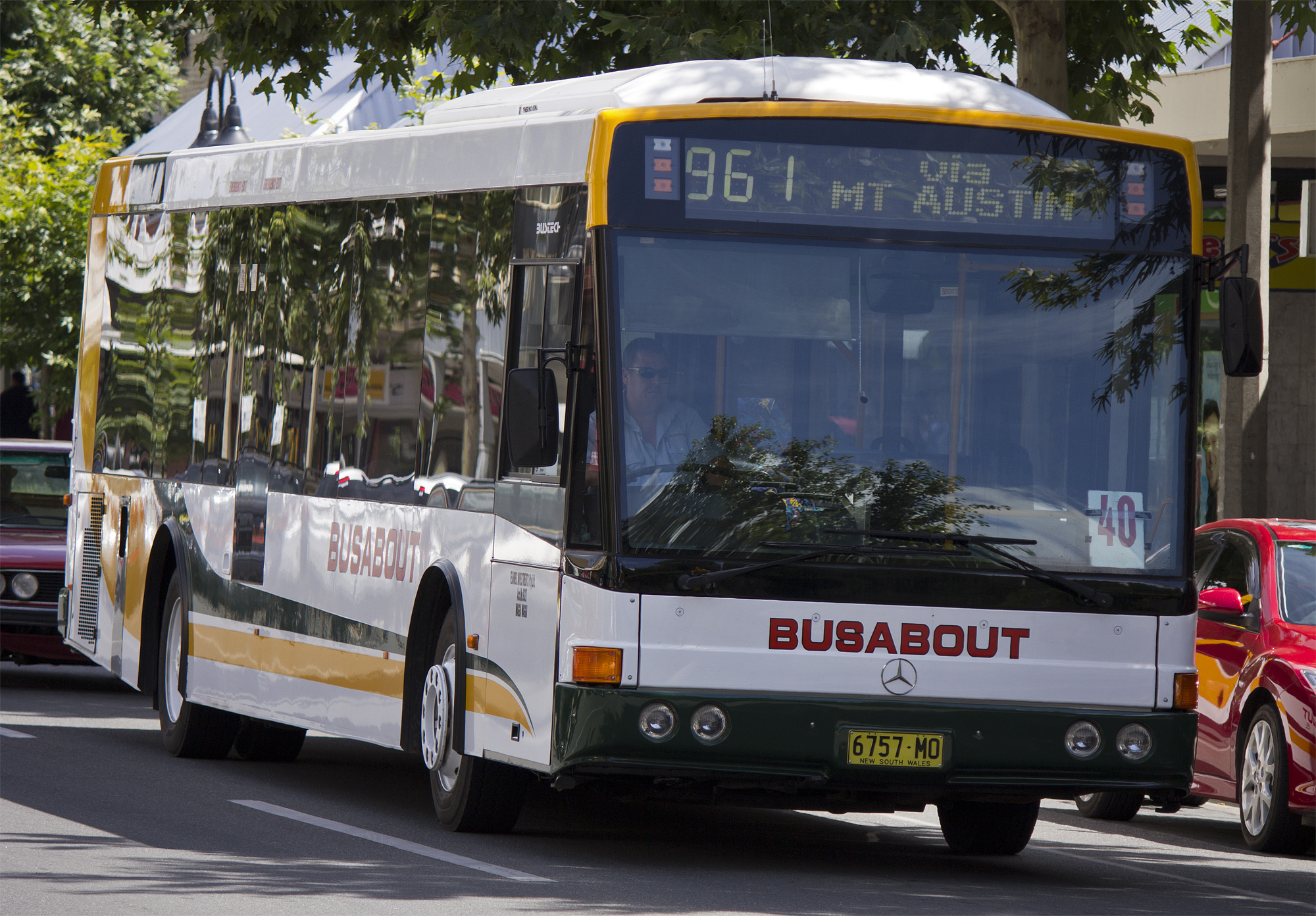
Busabout Wagga Wagga Mercedes-Benz O405NH (Bustech) in Sydney

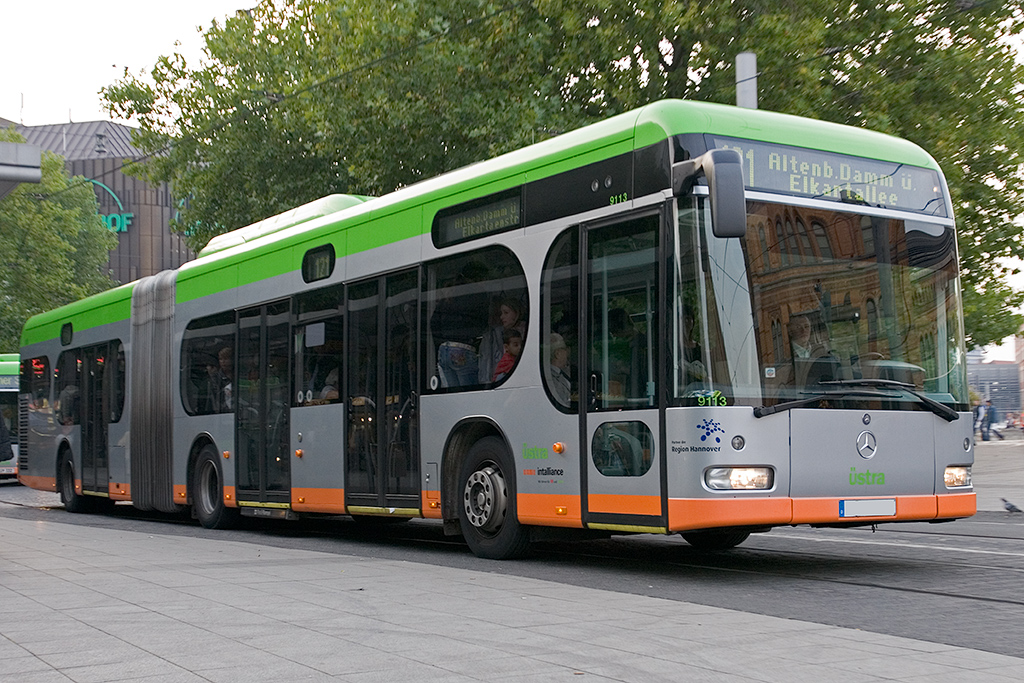
Irvine-designed Citaro G in Hanover, Germany

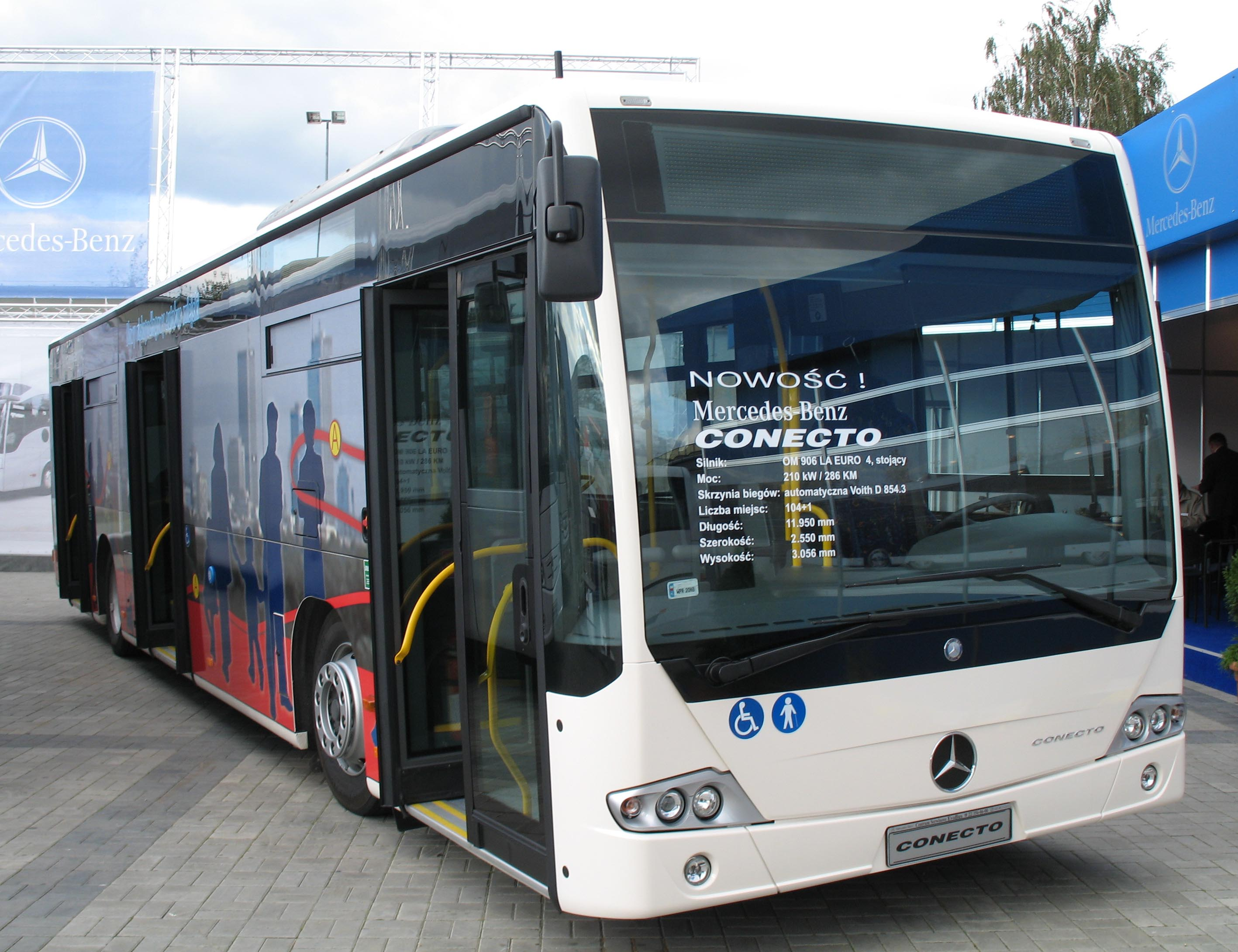
Mercedes-Benz Conecto.

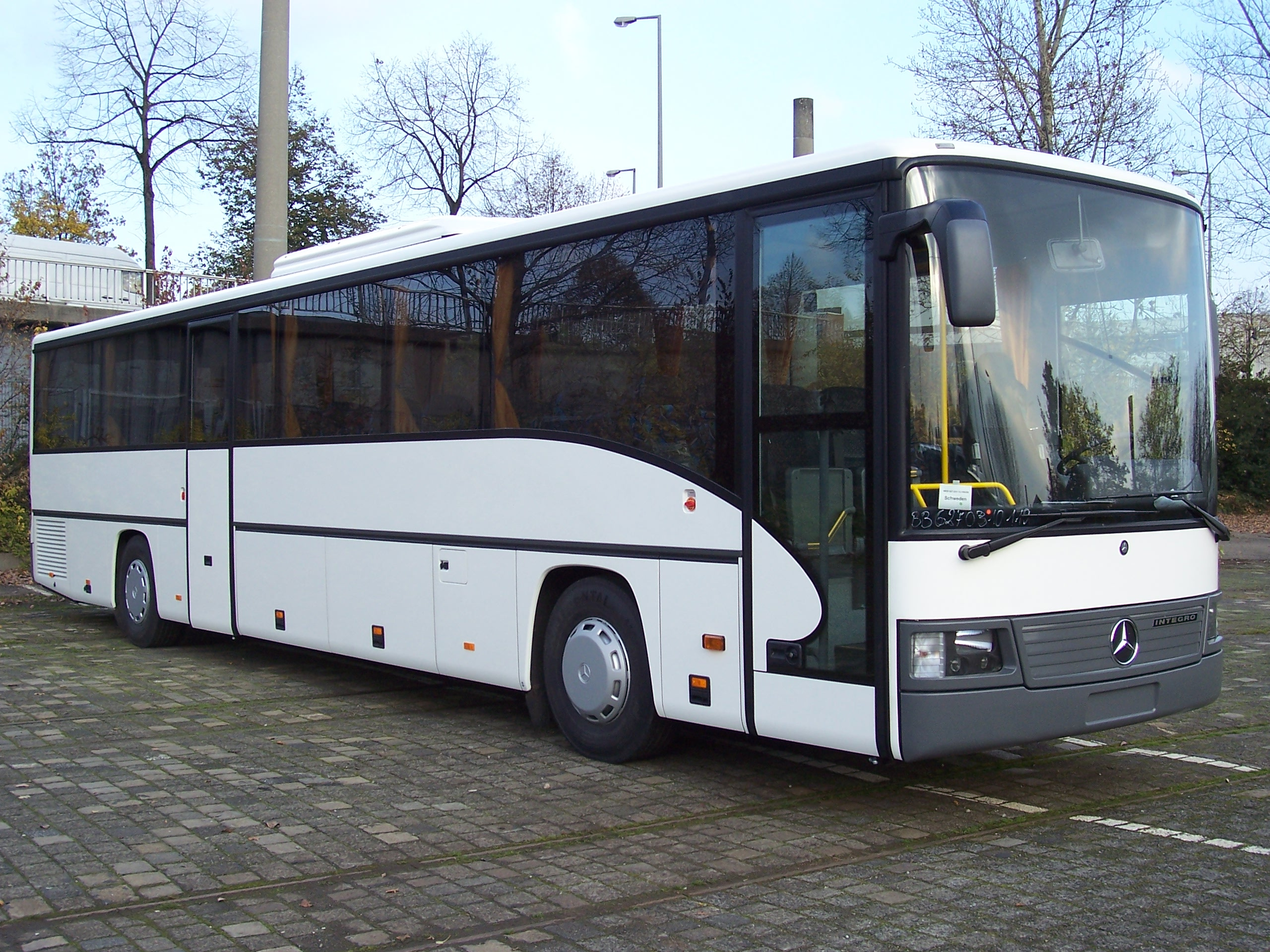
Mercedes-Benz Integro Intercity bus.

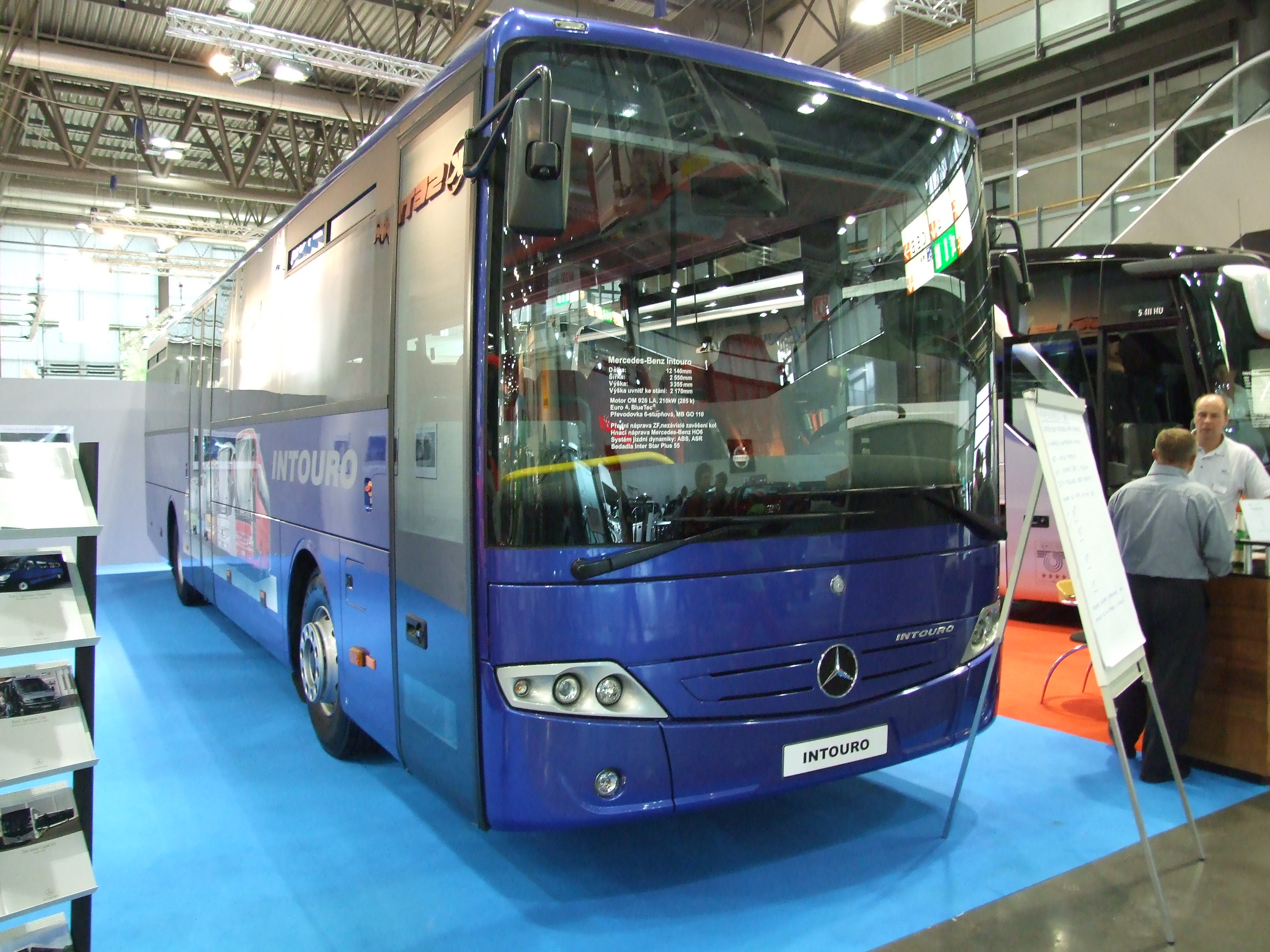
Mercedes-Benz Intouro Intercity coach.

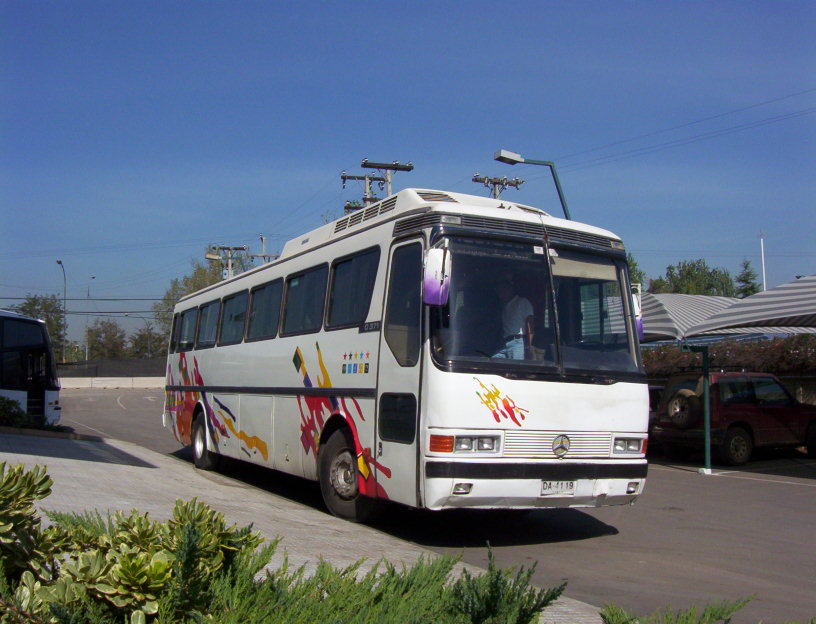
Mercedes-Benz O371RS in Chile.

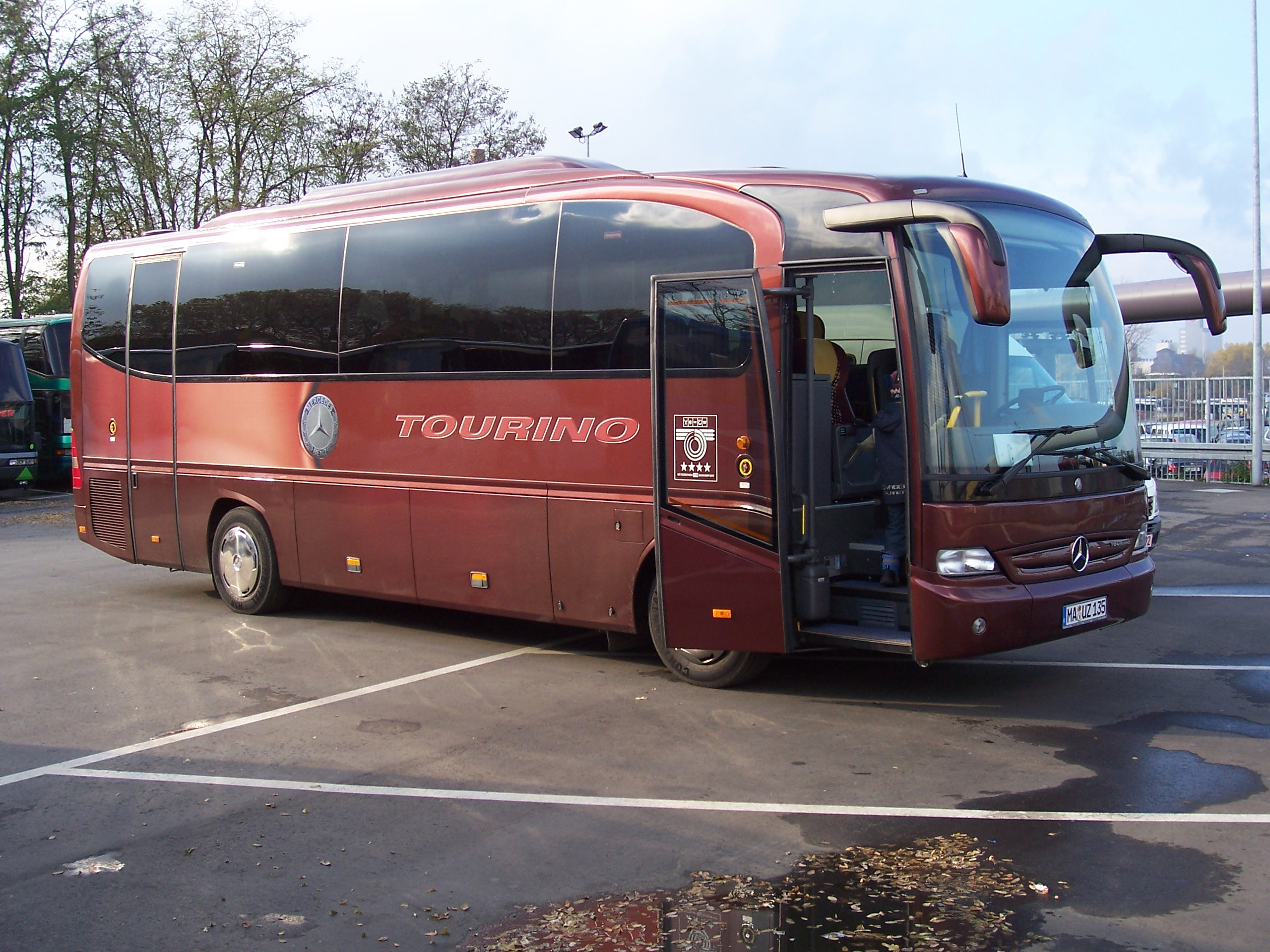
Mercedes-Benz Tourino.

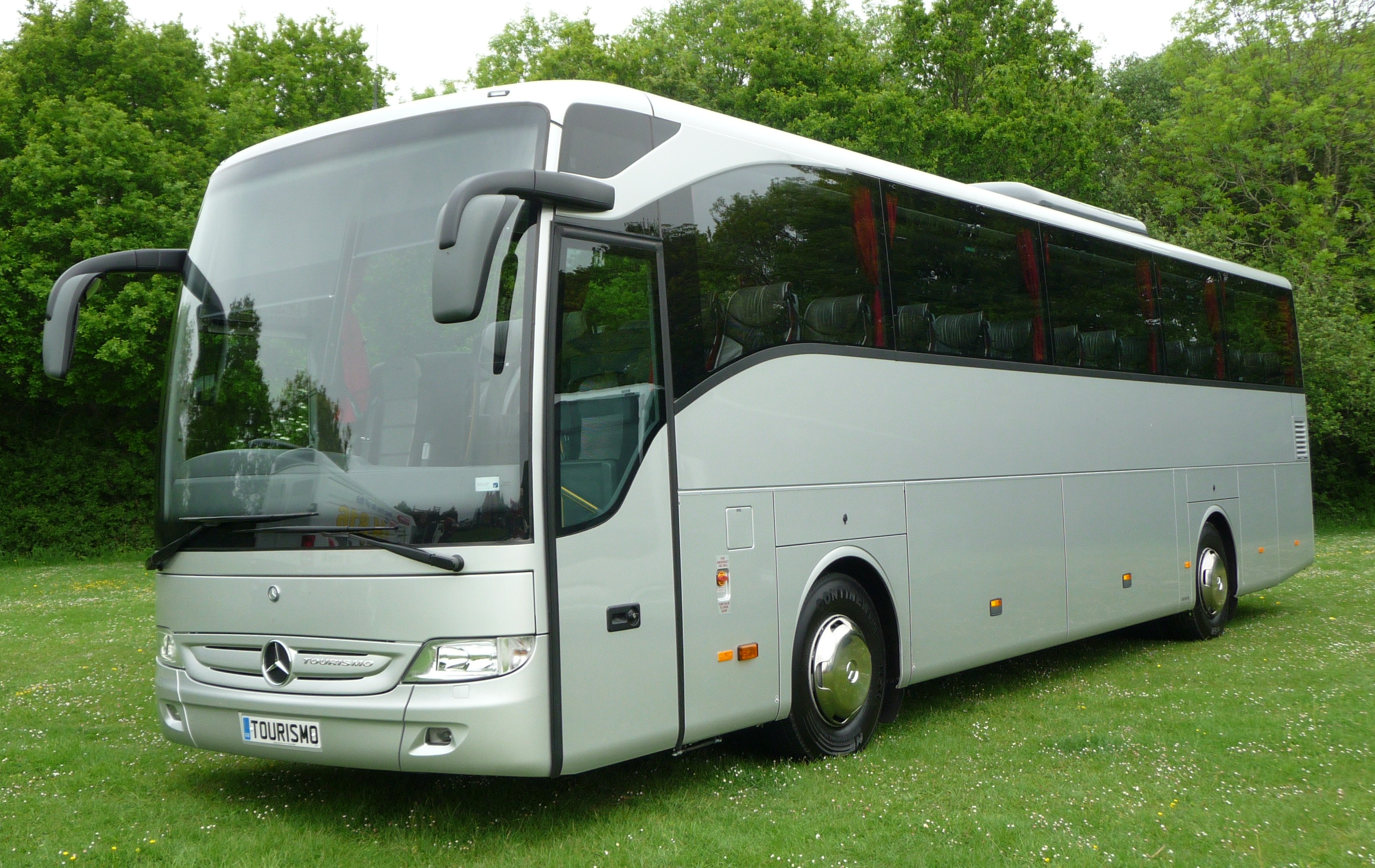
A Mercedes-Benz Tourismo demonstrator.

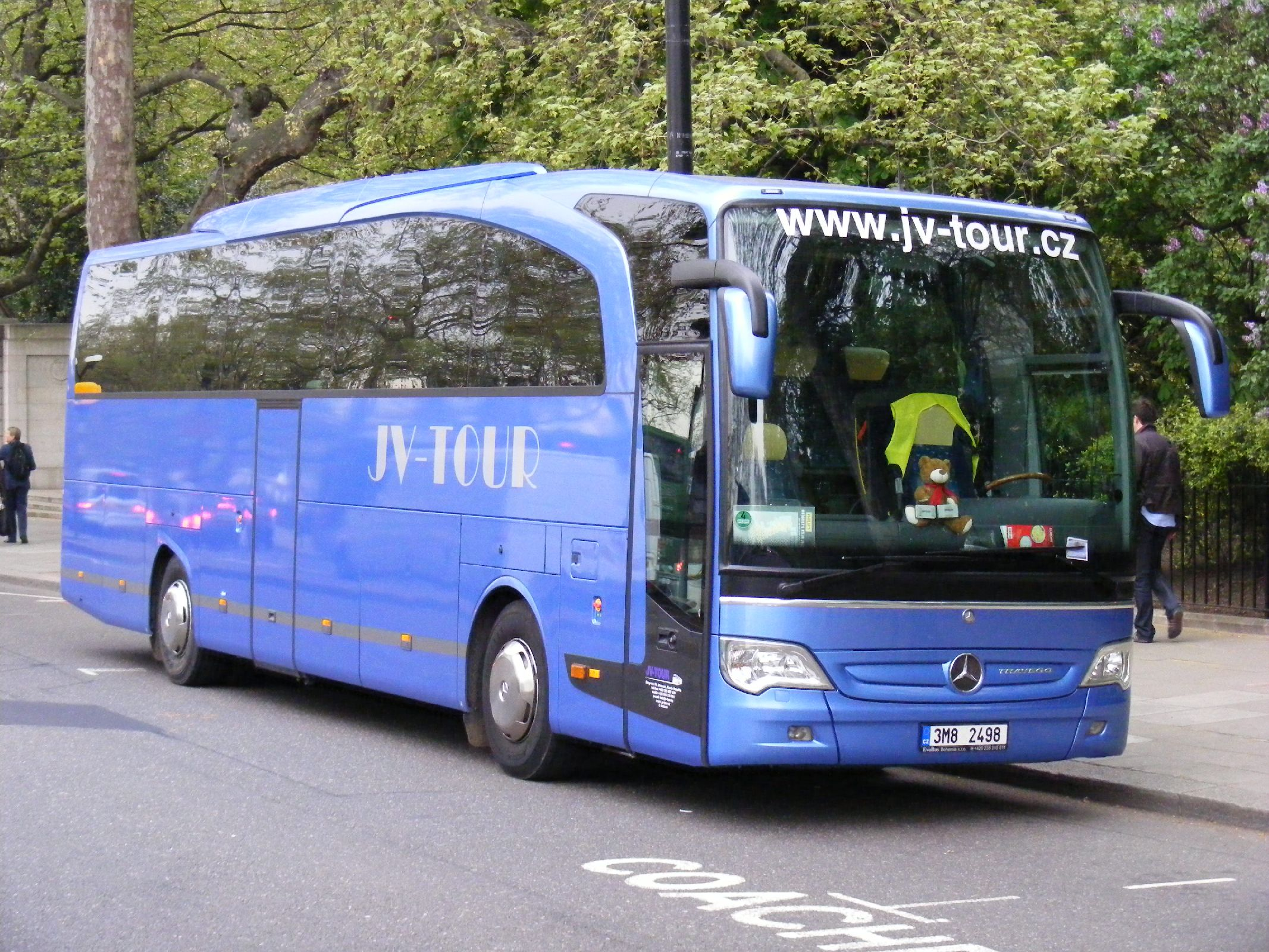
Mercedes-Benz Travego coach.

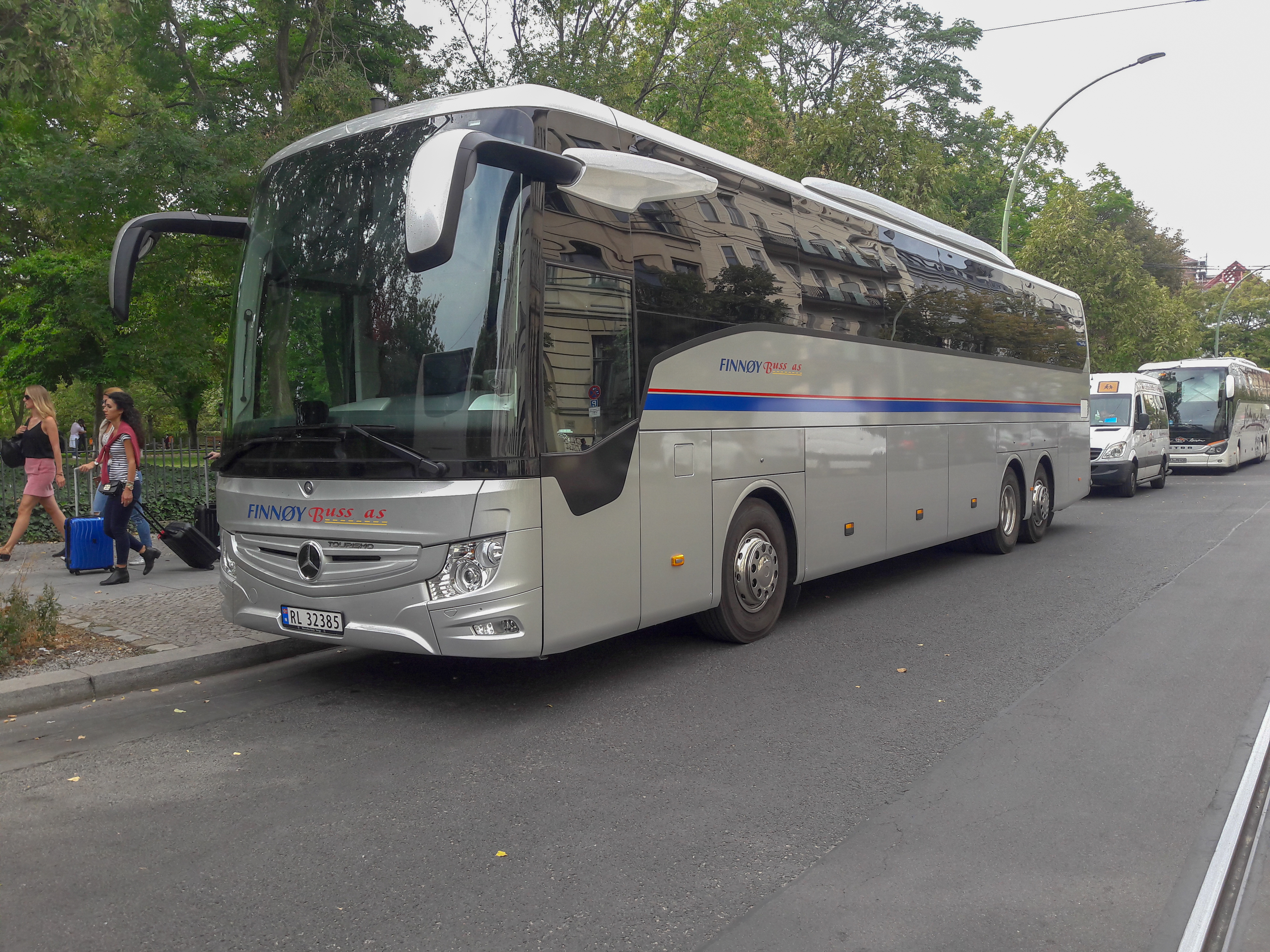
Third generation Tourismo L

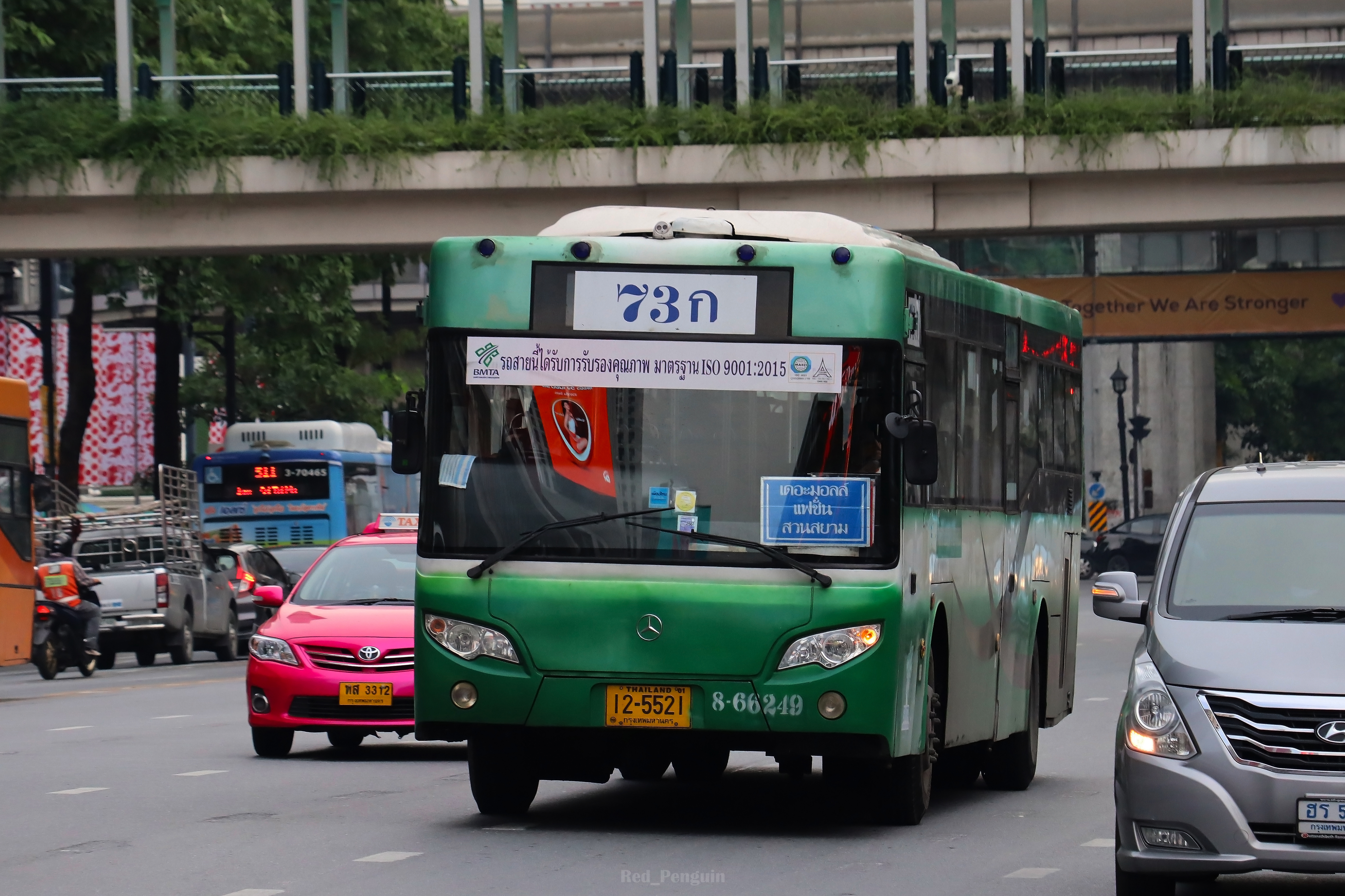
BMTA Mercedes-Benz OH1829/63 in Bangkok, Thailand

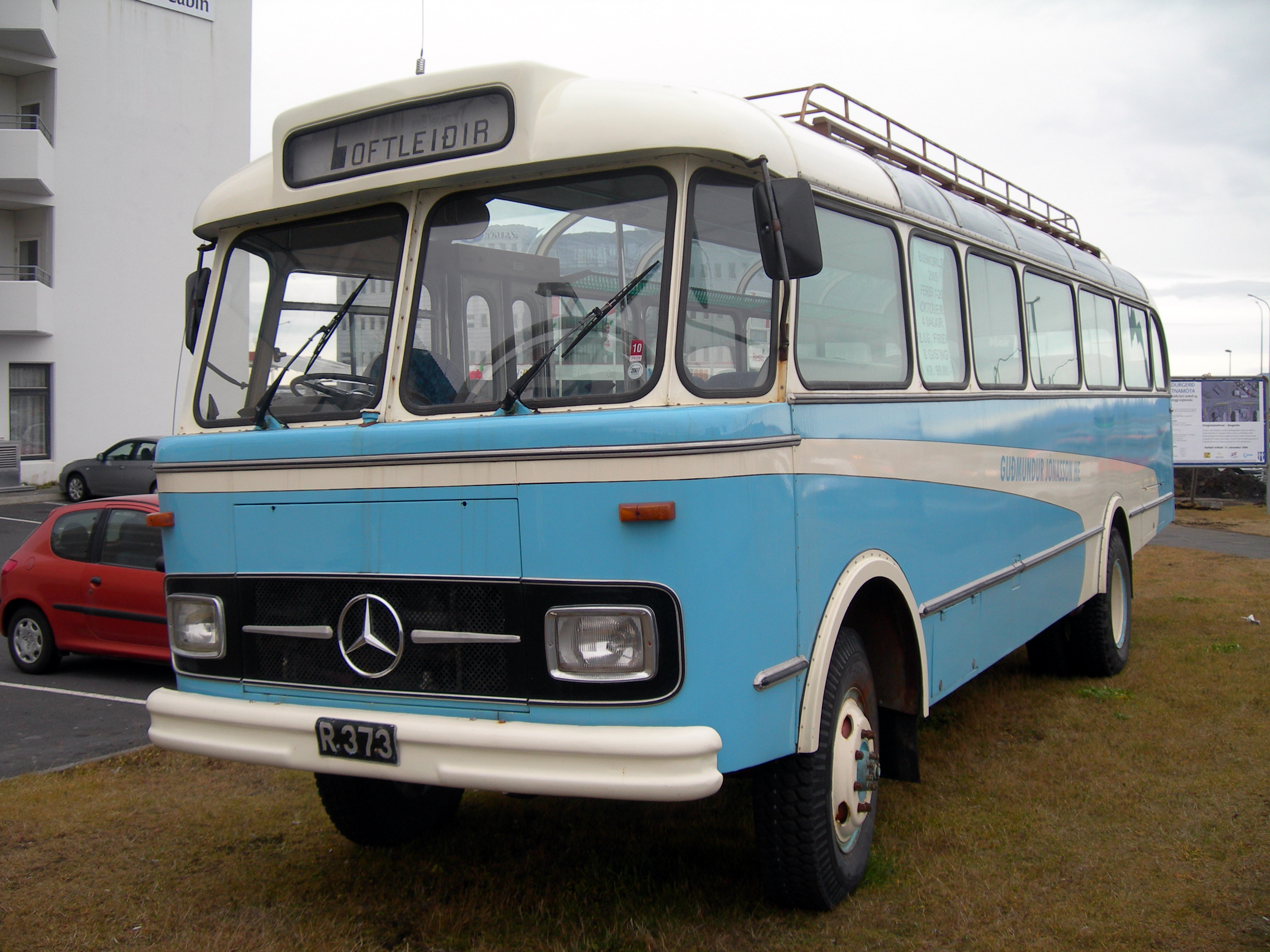
1960 Mercedes-Benz LPOA 322, in Iceland

== See also ==
- List of Mercedes-Benz vehicles
- List of Mercedes-Benz trucks
