= Mercedes-Benz O309 =

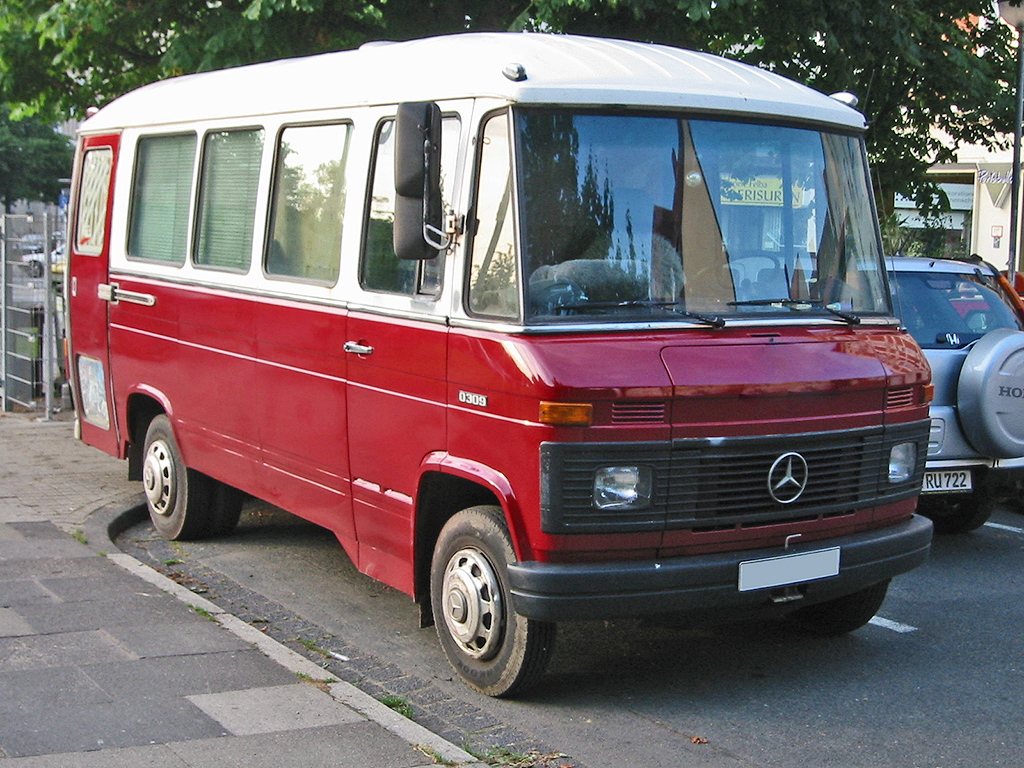
- A Mercedes-Benz O309.

Overview
- Manufacturer: Mercedes-Benz
- Assembly: Tehran, Iran (Iran Khodro Diesel); 6th of October, Egypt; Istanbul, Turkey Mercedes-Benz Türk

Body and chassis
- Floor type: step entrance

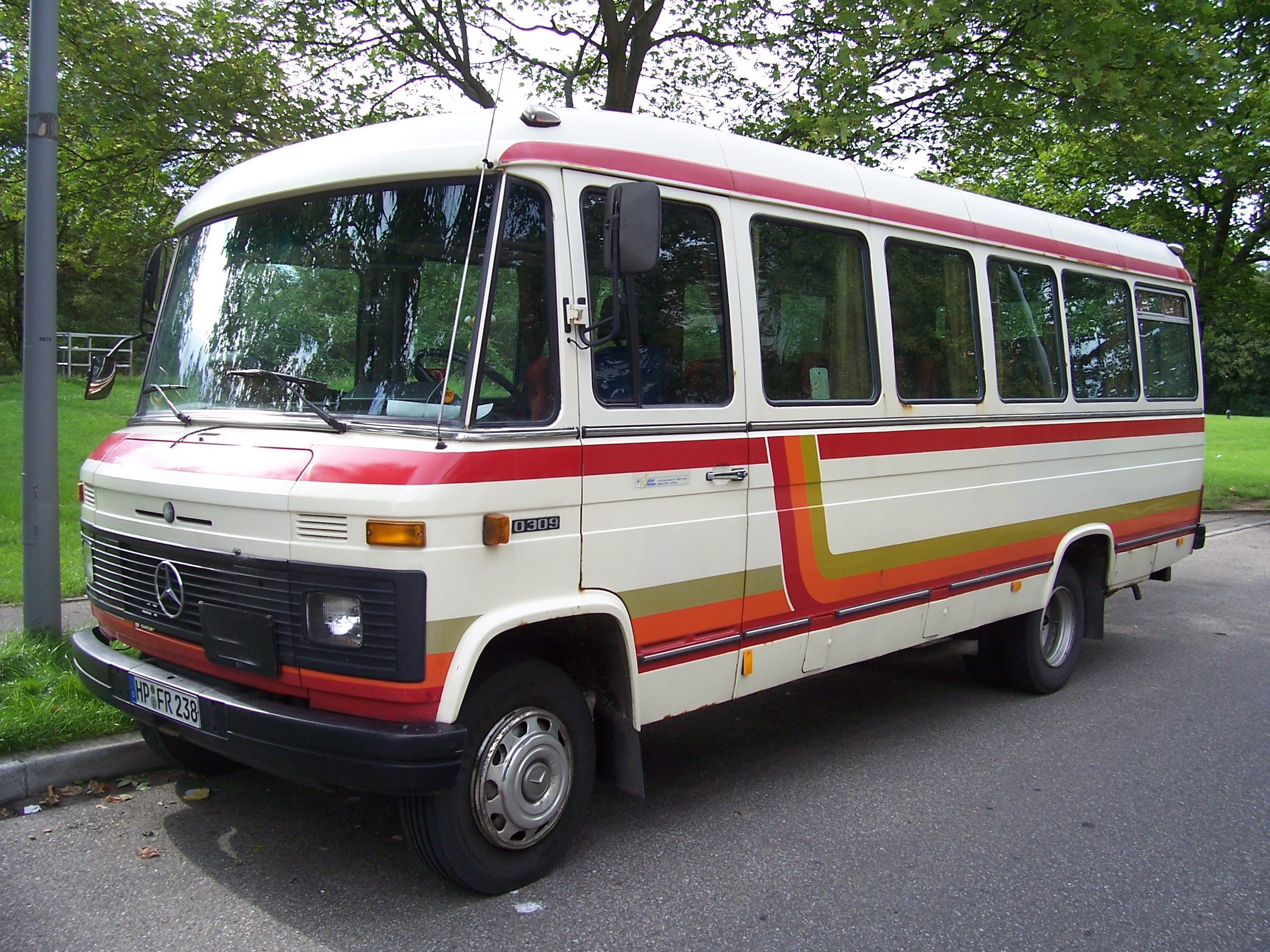
A 24-passenger version of Mercedes-Benz O309.

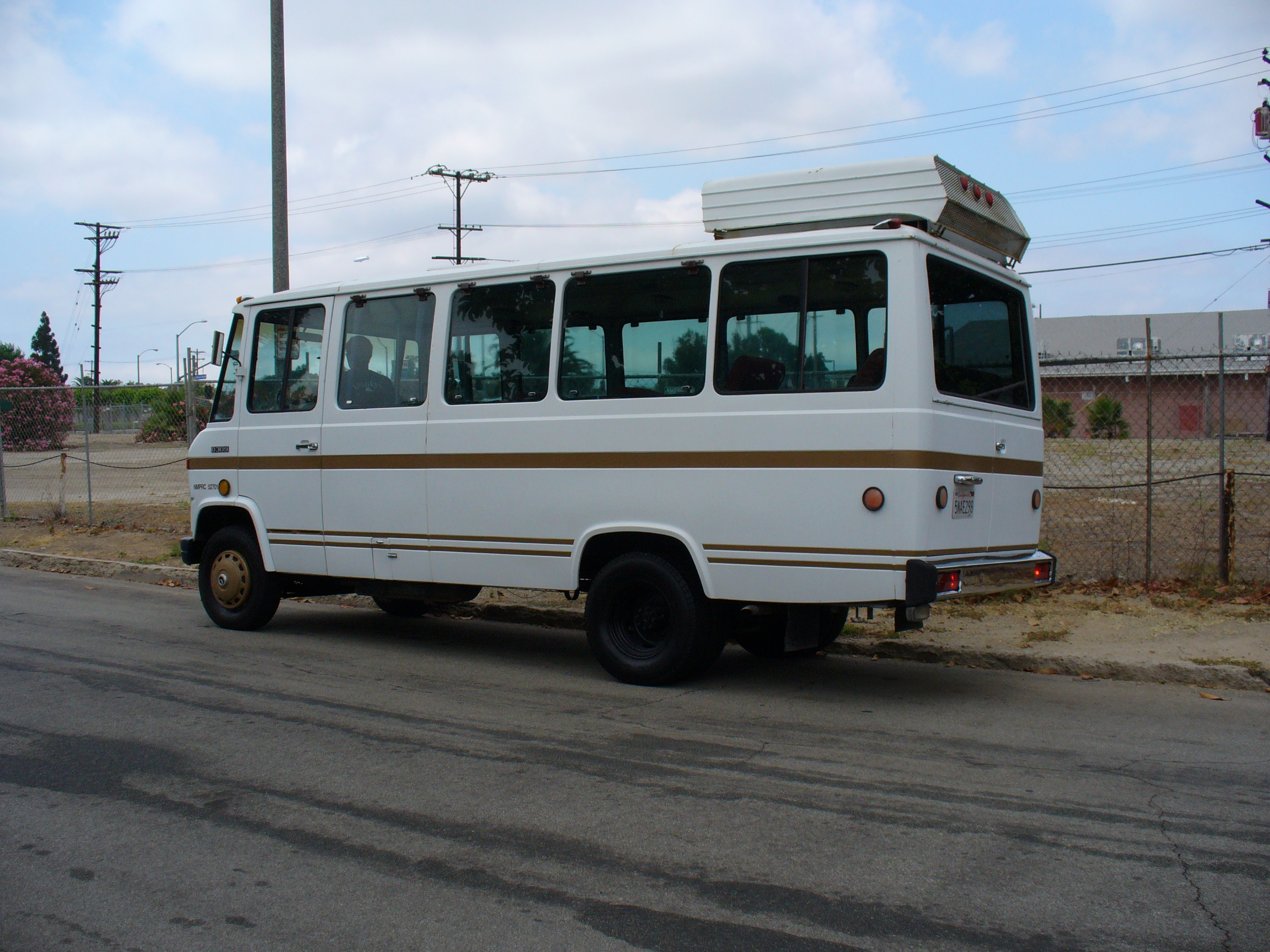
Rear view of a Mercedes-Benz O309.

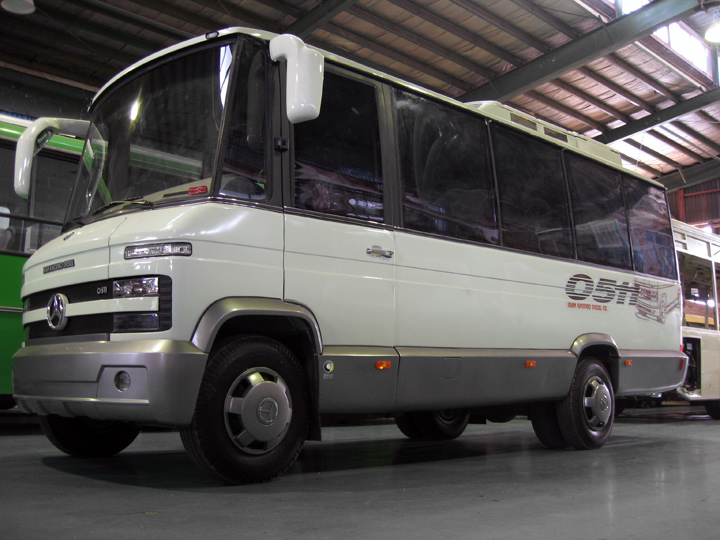
An Iran Khodro diesel Minibus O511.

The Mercedes-Benz O309 or Angkor Minibus was the bus variant of the Düsseldorfer Transporter, a large capacity van that became available in 1967. During its lifetime, 10 different engines - with four or six cylinders delivering 55-130 hp - were available. The O 309 was the successor of the O 319 and the predecessor of the Mercedes-Benz T2 second generation and the Vario. The internal chassis-designations for the O 309 are 309, 310 and 313.

== Production in Turkey ==
Production of the Mercedes-Benz O 309 in Turkey began in 1976 under Otomarsan, the company established in Istanbul in 1967 that later became Mercedes-Benz Türk. The model was introduced at a time when Turkey's tourism industry was developing, and it was used for passenger transport and tourism services.

A contemporary advertisement published in the Turkish newspaper Milliyet on 7 October 1976 promoted the O 309 D as a 22-passenger minibus. The advertisement specified a four-cylinder diesel engine rated at 95 horsepower and a five-speed gearbox. It presented the vehicle as suitable for interurban and rural routes, school and hotel transport, tourism, and transfers to bus and railway terminals.

== Production in Iran ==
In Iran, the O 309 was manufactured or assembled by Iran National in cooperation with Daimler-Benz. A United Nations Industrial Development Organization (UNIDO) report documents the production of O 309 minibuses at the company's Tehran factory. The Iranian version used the OM 314 diesel engine, rated at 85 hp, and was offered in short- and long-wheelbase configurations for 12 to 17 passengers.

== Models ==
O 309 Diesel (1967-1986)

Model	Engine	Cylinders	Displacement	Max. Power @ min^{−1}	Max.torque @ min^{−1}	Years
O 309 (20D) / 406 D	OM 621	I4	1988 cc	40 kW (55 hp) / 4350	113 Nm / 2400	1967
O 309 (22D) / 406 D	OM 615 /22	I4	2197 cc	44 kW (60 hp) / 4200	126 Nm / 2400	1968–1974
O 309 (24D) / 407 D	OM 616	I4	2404 cc	48 kW (65 hp) / 4200	137 Nm / 2400	1974–1982
O 309 (24D) / 407 D	OM 616	I4	2399 cc	53 kW (72 hp) / 4400	137 Nm / 2400	1982-1986
O 309 (38D) / 408 D / 508 D / 608 D	OM 314	I4	3758 cc	63 kW (85 hp) / 2800 (59 kW (80 hp) / 2800)	172 Nm / 2400	1968–1986 (408D 1968–1972)
O 309 (56D) / 613 D	OM 352	I6	5600 cc	96 kW (130 hp) / 2800	363 Nm / 2000	1977–1986

O 309 Petrol (1967-1986)

Model	Engine	Cylinders	Displacement	Max. Power @ min^{−1}	Max.torque @ min^{−1}	Years
O 309 (20B) / 408	M 121	I4	1988 cc	59 kW (80 hp) / 5000		1967
O 309 (22B) / 408	M 115/22	I4	2197 cc	63 kW (85 hp) / 5000		1968–1974
O 309 (23B) / 409	M 115/23	I4	2307 cc	66 kW (90 hp) / 4800	160 Nm / 2000	1974–1982
O 309 (23B) / 410	M 102	I4	2299 cc	70 kW (95 hp) / 5200	170 Nm / 2500	1982–1986
