= Mercedes-Benz O371 =

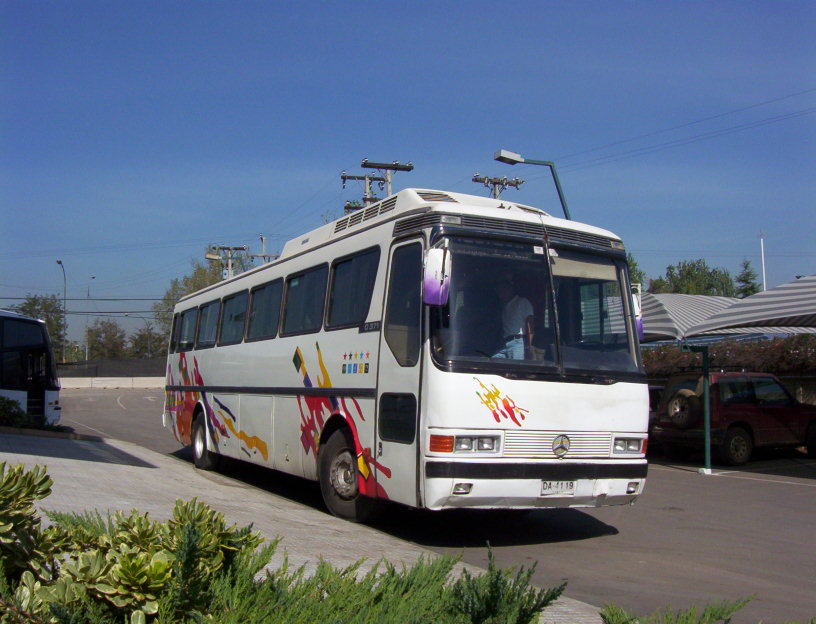
- Mercedes-Benz O371RS

Overview
- Manufacturer: Mercedes-Benz

Body and chassis
- Doors: 1
- Floor type: Step entrance
- Chassis: O371R, O371RS, O371RSD

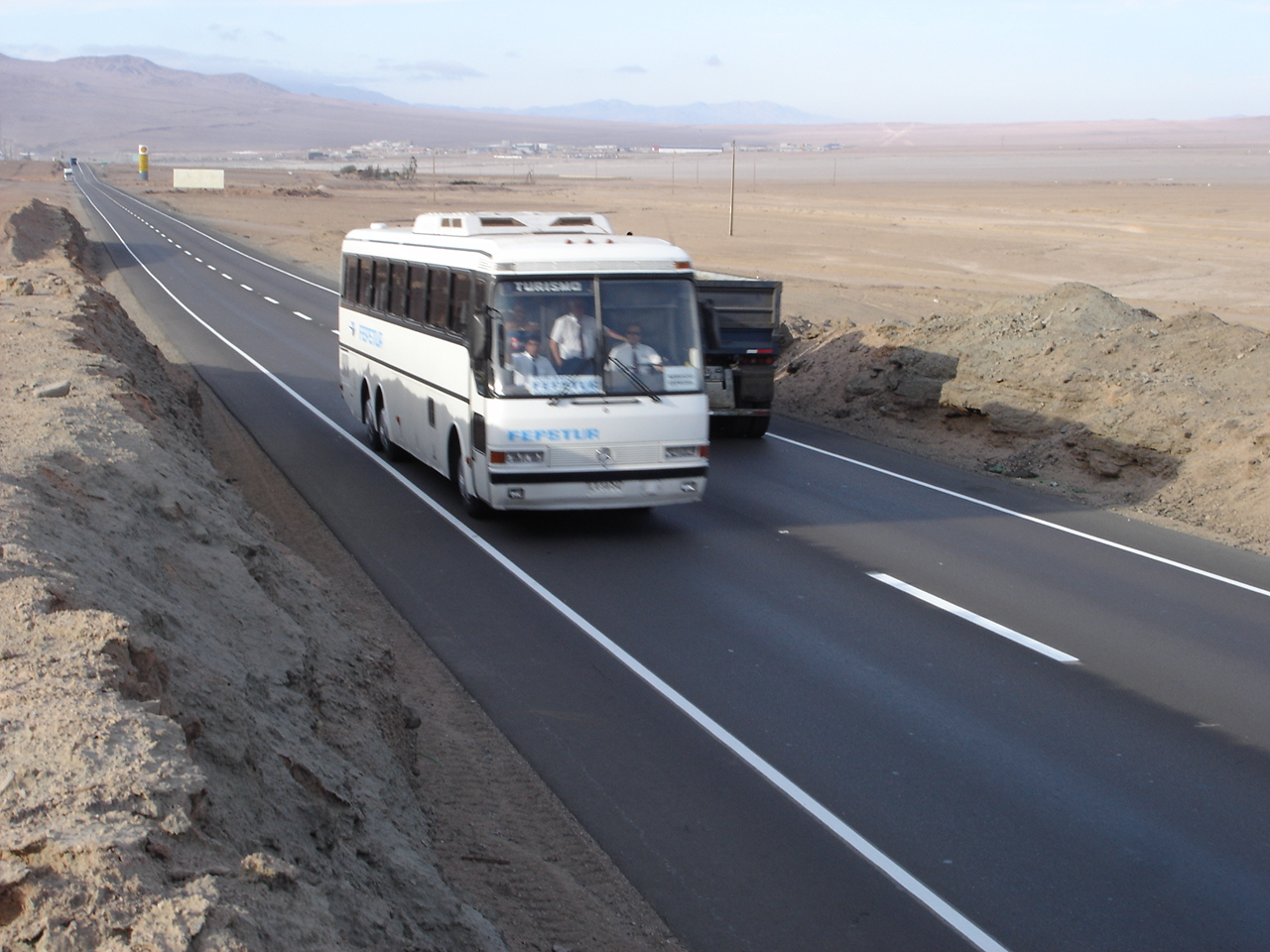
Mercedes-Benz O371RSD

The Mercedes-Benz O371 is a monocoque body coach built in Brazil by Mercedes-Benz from the 1980s to the late-1990s. It was the replacement for the Mercedes-Benz O303 chassis in South America and was widely used in South America. It was also used widely in other countries like Mexico, or Costa Rica. The O371 was an entirely Mercedes-Benz built product, but the chassis was also sent to bodyworkers including Marcopolo or Busscar.

== Coach buses ==
=== O371R ===
The O371R was marketed between mid-1980 and early 1990s. It featured a Mercedes-Benz OM355/5A at 230HP. It has a spring suspension.

=== O371RS ===
The O371RS was marketed between the 1980s and early 1990s as O370RS. It featured a Mercedes-Benz OM355/6A turbocharger aspirated engine with output of 291 hp. The gearbox coupled to the engine was the ZF S6-90, and has pneumatic suspension. The O371RS chassis was used in the O371RS model production, by Mercedes-Benz do Brasil and others like Busscar or Nielson, Marcopolo S.A.

=== O371RSL ===
The O371RSL was marketed between 1992 and early 1994. It featured a Mercedes-Benz OM447LA Turbo-intercooler engine with output of 354cv and 360cv. This was an experimental engine and replaced the OM355 series, and was used in all the O371 models and in the next generation of buses Mercedes-Benz O400 until 2000, the year that the electronic engine OM457LA was introduced. The gearbox was the ZF S 6 - 1550. The O371RSL chassis was similar with the O371RS chassis but its length was 13.20 meters.

=== O371RSD ===
The O371RSD was marketed between mid-1980 and early 1990 as O370RSD. It featured a Mercedes-Benz OM355/6LA turbo intercooler engine with output of 326 hp. After 1994 was impulsed by an OM447LA of 354cv and 360cv. The gearbox was the same of the O371RS, also after 1994 it used the same gearbox that was used in O371RSL. The difference is the rear axis, because the axis that move the vehicle is behind the auxiliary axle, opposite to the European bus version.

== Urban buses ==
=== O371U ===
The O371U was a small integral bus for urban use, having been produced from 1987 to 1994. It was produced in the Campinas plant in Sao Paulo. In its last year of production it featured the front mask of the O400 family.

=== O371UL ===
The O371UL was an integral bus for urban use, having been produced from 1994 to 1996. It was the evolution of O371U, having gained a few inches in width, front air suspension, and some horsepower. It also featured the front mask of the O400 family. Many units of this model could be found in use in the region of Belo Horizonte, Brazil between 1994 and 2006.

=== O371UP ===
The O371UP was an integral bus and platform for urban use, having been produced from 1987 to 1993. It was the most powerful integral bus of Mercedes-Benz ever produced, featuring a 187 hp OM355/5A 9.6l 5-cylinder engine, with its use being recommended to cities with integrated transport systems. By far, the Brazilian city that saw the most units of O371UP integral buses and platforms in operation was Curitiba.

=== O371TR ===
The O371TR was a trolleybus version featuring an electronic control system and an 120 kW (600 V DC) electric motor supplied by Villares. Due to restrictions on public debt and the oil crisis being over, only two or three units were sold to the city of Araraquara.
