= DCU =

DCU may refer to:

- D.C. United, an American professional soccer team based in Washington, D.C., United States
- DC Universe, the fictional universe that serves as a setting for DC Comics stories
  - DC Universe (franchise), a media franchise
- Daegu Catholic University, a university in South Korea
- Dublin City University
  - DCU GAA, a Gaelic games club in Dublin City University
- Digital Federal Credit Union, a credit union based in Marlborough, Massachusetts, United States
- DCU Center, an indoor arena in Worcester, Massachusetts, United States
- Delphi Compiled Unit, an object file for the programming language Delphi (software)
- Desert Camouflage Uniform, a U.S. military uniform that was used in arid areas during the 1990s and 2000s
- Detached Carrier Unit of the United States Postal Service
- Pryor Field Regional Airport, an airport Decatur, Alabama, United States, with the IATA code DCU
- Dicyclohexylurea, an organic compound
- Door control unit, an automotive electronic system
- Diabetes Care Unit, a unit at University of Malaya Medical Centre, Kuala Lumpur, Malaysia

== See also ==
- DC Universe (disambiguation)
