= Unimog 405 =

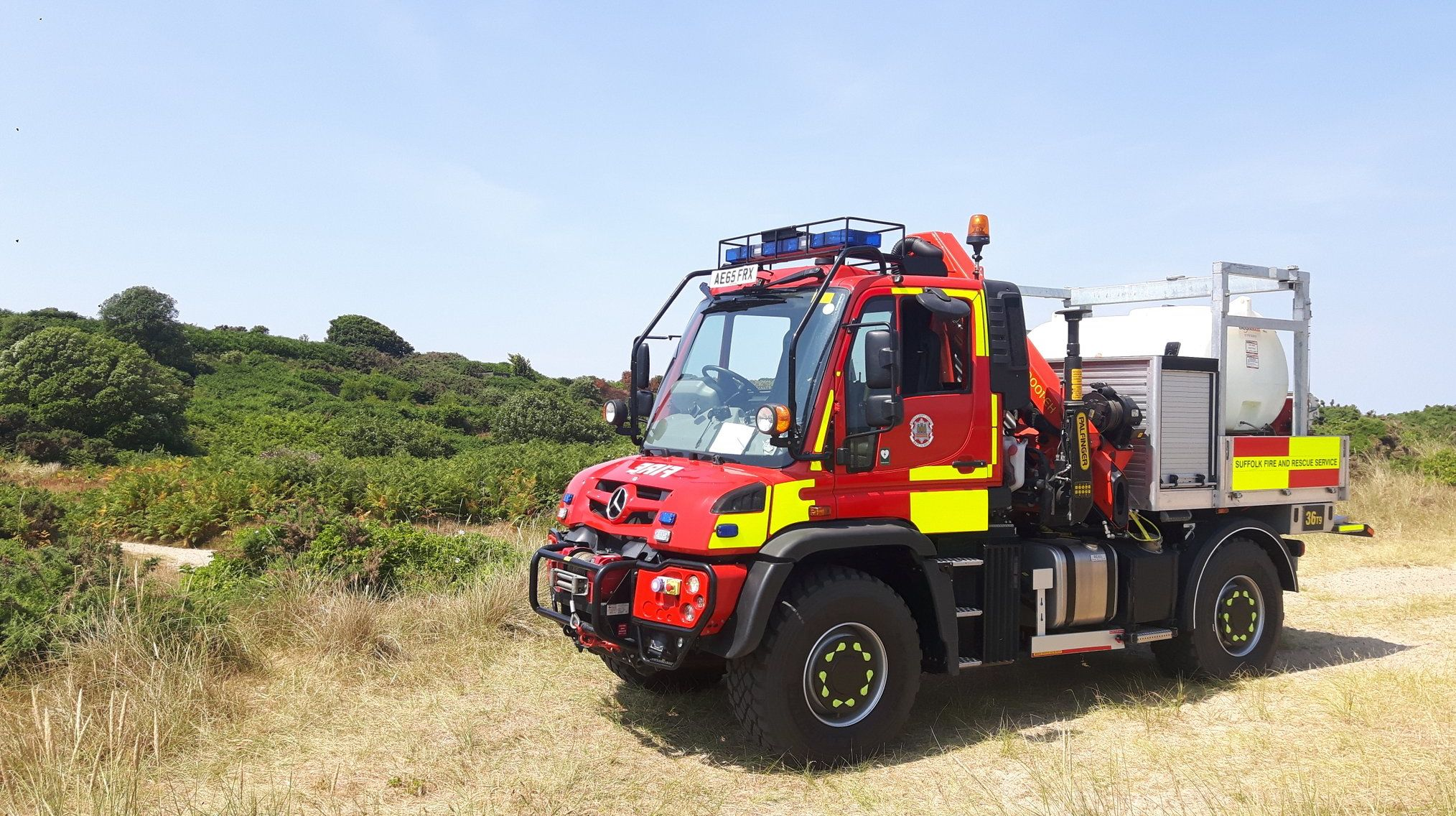
- Unimog-405-based fire engine (UGE)

Overview
- Type: 7.5-tonne lorry; 40-tonne lorry; Agricultural tractor
- Manufacturer: DaimlerChrysler AG (2000–2007); Daimler AG (2007–2019); Daimler Truck Holding AG (2019–present)
- Also called: U 20; U 290, U 300, U 400, U 500; Since 2013: U 216, U 218, U 219; U 318, U 319, U 323, U 327; U 423, U 427, U 430, U 435; U 527, U 529, U 530, U 535
- Production: 2000–present
- Assembly: Germany: Gaggenau (2000–2002); Germany: Wörth (2002–present)

Body and chassis
- Class: Medium duty truck
- Layout: Front engine, permanent all-wheel drive
- Related: Unimog 437.4

Powertrain
- Engine: OM 900 series diesel engines: 110 – 260 kW: OM 904 straight-4 (4.25 dm³); OM 906 straight-6 (6.4 dm³); OM 934 straight-4 (5.1 dm³); OM 936 straight-6 (7.7 dm³)
- Transmission: UG 100-8 eight-speed semi-automatic

Dimensions
- Wheelbase: 2,700–3,600 mm
- Length: 4,800–6,120 mm
- Width: 2,150–2,300 mm
- Height: 2,830–2,940 mm

Chronology
- Predecessor: Unimog 408, 418, 427

The Unimog 405 is a vehicle of the Unimog-series by Mercedes-Benz, made by Daimler Truck Holding AG. (Note: The Unimog 405's manufacturer changed its name three times throughout the Unimog 405's development phase and production run, and split off its truck business in 2019. Originally, the manufacturer's name was Daimler-Benz. From 1997 until 2007, the manufacturer was called DaimlerChrysler, and from 2007 until 2022, the name was Daimler. Since October 2019, the truck business has been called Daimler Truck Holding. Daimler changed its name to Mercedes-Benz Group in 2022; Mercedes-Benz Group has since been a majority shareholder of Daimler Truck Holding. This article uses the contemporary manufacturer names.) Developed in the 1990s, the Unimog 405 has been in production since 2000. Originally, DaimlerChrysler produced the Unimog at Gaggenau; in 2002, production was moved to Wörth am Rhein. The Unimog 405 is the implement carrier version of the Unimog and the successor to most previous Unimogs. Although retaining many characteristics typical of the Unimog, the 405's axle and chassis design concept with control arms instead of torque tubes marks a "paradigmatic change" in Unimog design.

The Unimog 405 can legally be classified as either a 7.5-tonne lorry (C1), a 40-tonne lorry (C), or agricultural tractor (T). It is produced alongside the heavy-duty, off-road lorry-like Unimog 437.4, which features a different technical design. The Unimog 405 has been made in three major variants: UGN (2000–2016), LUG (2007–2013), and UGE (since 2013). In total, 22 types of the Unimog 405 have been made, with two types (405.210 and 405.230) exclusively sold on the North-American market as the Freightliner Unimog U 500.

== Unimog 405 types and model family ==
Throughout its more than 20-year-long production, the Unimog 405 has been developed into an implement carrier family that comprises various different variants, models, and types. In total, three different variants of the Unimog 405 were made. DaimlerChrysler originally introduced the Unimog 405 in the UGN variant (Unimog Geräteträger Neu; new Unimog implement carrier), which was succeeded by the UGE variant in 2013. From 2007 until 2013 the LUG variant (leichter Unimog-Geräteträger; light Unimog implement carrier) was made alongside the UGN variant. In total, 13,930 Unimog 405 of the LUG and UGN variants were made; the UGE is still in production (as of November 2022) and thus has varying production figures.

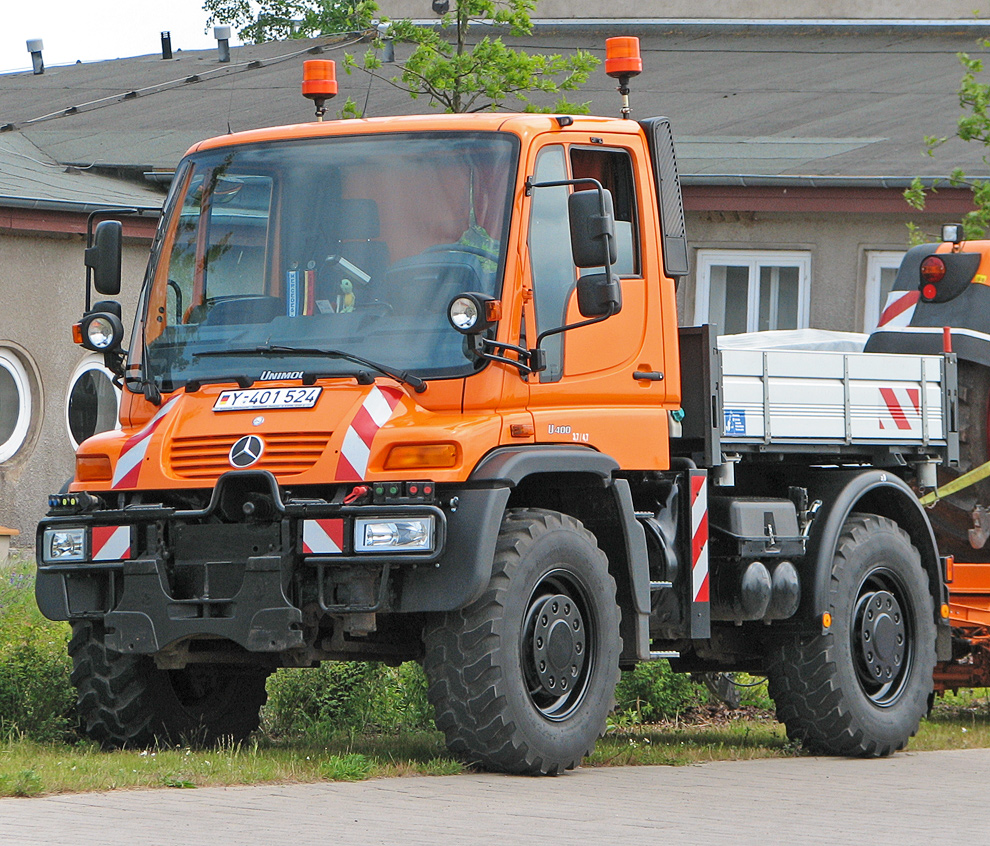
UGN variant (2000–2016)

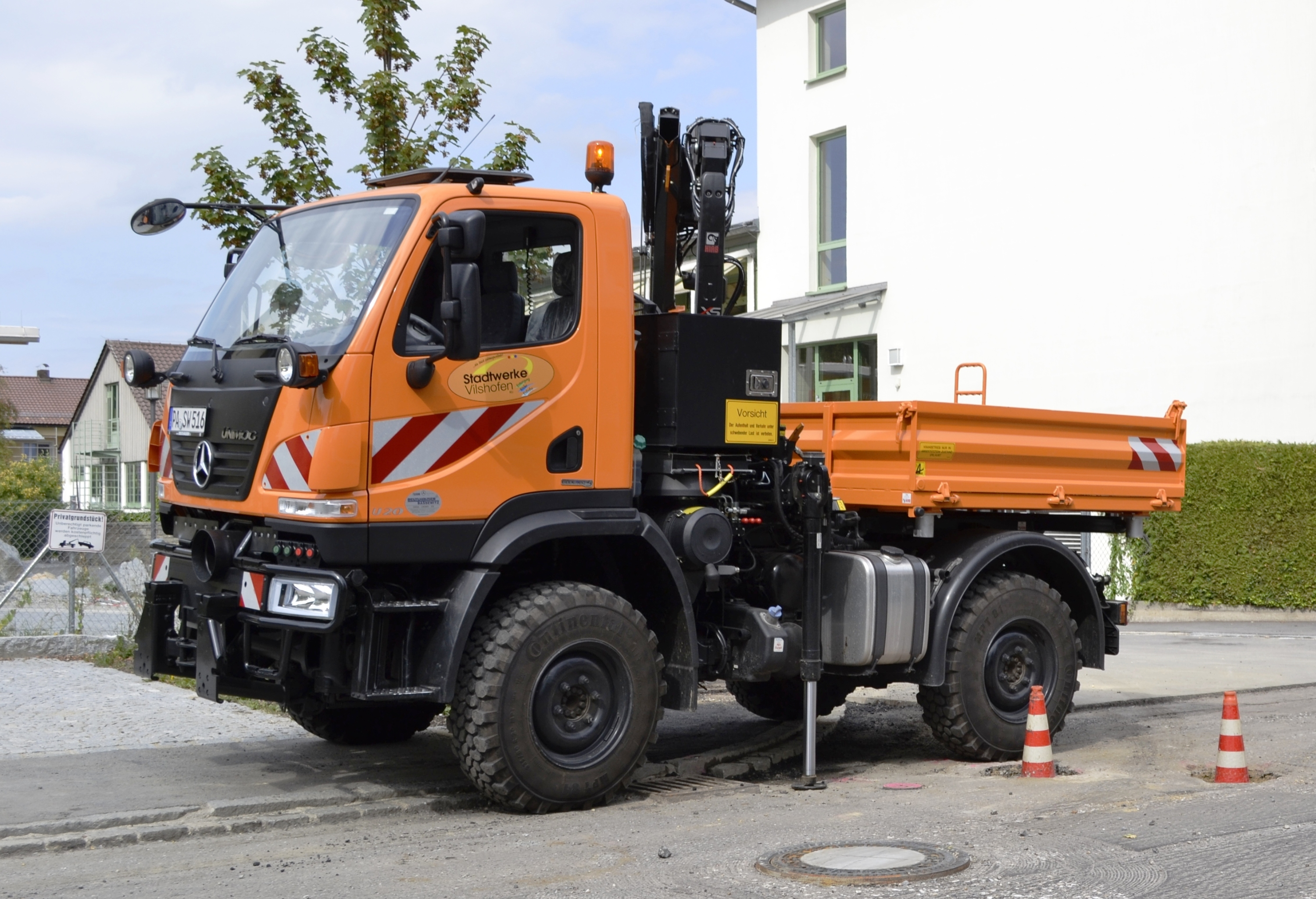
LUG variant (2007–2013)

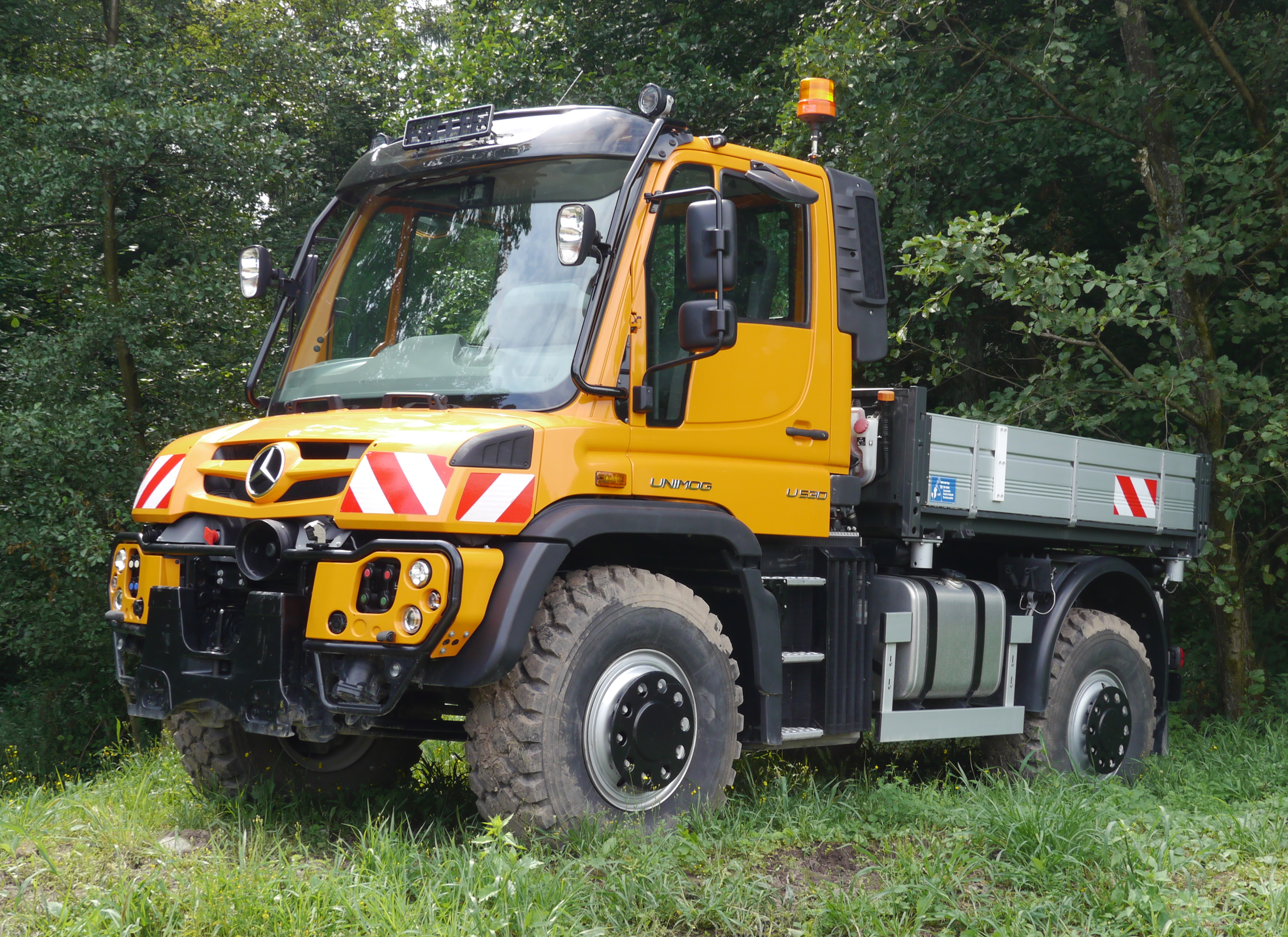
UGE variant 2013–)

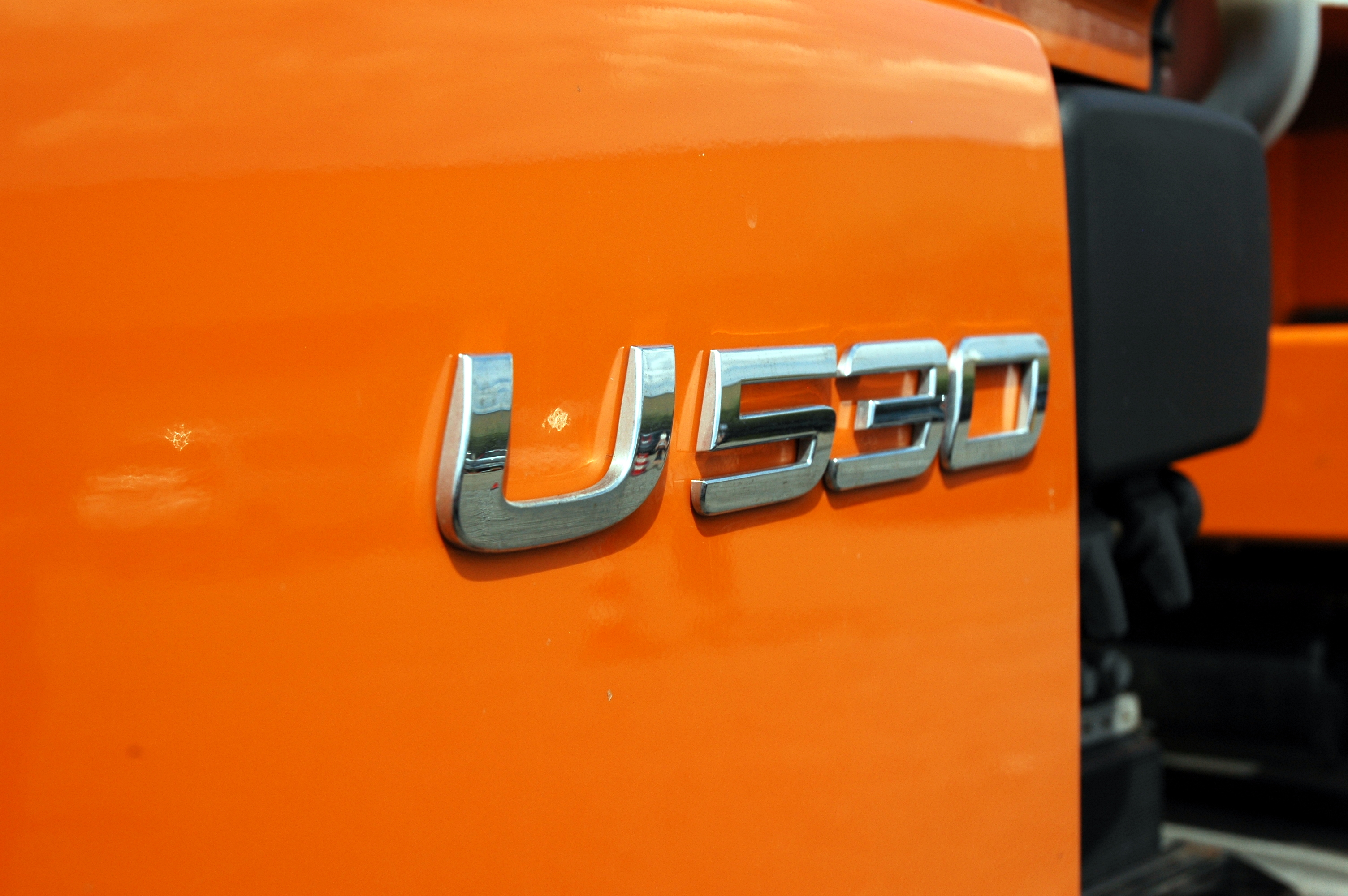
U 530 types' designation, indicating a high-payload model with a 300 PS (220 kW) engine (Unimog 405.202)

The model designation (i.e. the sales designation) of all Unimog 405 vehicles is a three-digit number with a U-prefix, e.g. U 318. The only exception is the LUG variant of the Unimog, which was sold as the U 20. In the model designation, the first digit is roughly indicative of the maximum permissible payload: 2: 7.5–9.3 t, 3: 7.5–10.2 t, 4: 12–12.5 t, 5: 15.5–16 t. Since the introduction of the UGE variant in 2014, the second and third digit have been used to indicate tenths of the approximate engine power output in DIN-PS. For example, an Unimog U 318 is a UGE variant with a 180 PS (130 kW) engine, and may be classified as a 7.5-tonne lorry. There is one exception to this; the U 300 model was sold as the U 290 model in some markets.

The UGE model designation scheme includes the U 427 and U 435 models. These designations are also used as the series' designations for the Unimog 427, a predecessor of the Unimog 405, and for the Unimog 435. The aforementioned Unimogs 427 and 435 are different from the Unimog discussed in this article, the Unimog 405.

The types' designation in Unimog 405 is indicative of frame length (and thus wheelbase), the engine model, as well as the maximum permissible axle load. It consists of a six-digit number that begins with 405 and ends with a types' number. For instance, the Unimog U 318's types' designation (3000 mm wheelbase, OM 934 LA engine, low-payload axles) is 405.104. Compared with previous Unimogs, the 405 has a different axle concept, with different designs for low (U 2xx, U 3xx) and high (U 4xx, U 5xx) payload models. (Note: Since 2022, the Unimog U 327 has been on sale, which is technically a high-payload Unimog U 427 and thus has AU5/HU5 axles, a longer frame, and a bigger engine; cf. Daimler Truck Holding: Unimog U 327 tech specs) The types' designation scheme comes with different types's designations for different payload options. For instance, the 405.2xx types' designation is only used for high-payload U 5xx models. The types' designation also allows determining the Unimog 405's variant.

=== Types, variants, and models overview ===
Types' designation	Model designation	Variant	Engine	Wheelbase	Power output	Production figures (2000–2016)	Comments
405.050	U 20	LUG	OM 904 LA	2700 mm	110 kW, 115 kW, 130 kW	1.123	Production ceased
405.090	U 216, U 218, U 219	UGE	OM 934 LA	2800 mm	115 kW, 130 kW, 140 kW		
405.100	U 300	UGN	OM 904 LA	3080 mm	110 kW, 130 kW, 170 kW	1.593	Production ceased
405.101	U 290, U 300	UGN	OM 904 LA	3080 mm	110 kW, 115 kW, 130 kW	1.487	Production ceased
405.102	U 400	UGN	OM 906 LA	3080 mm	130 kW, 170 kW, 205 kW	2.531	Production ceased
405.103	U 400	UGN	OM 904 LA	3080 mm	130 kW, 175 kW, 210 kW	2.495	Production ceased
405.104	U 318, U 319	UGE	OM 934 LA	3000 mm	130 kW, 140 kW		
405.105	U 323	UGE	OM 934 LA	3000 mm	170 kW		
405.110	U 327, U 427, U 429, U 430, U 435	UGE	OM 936 LA	3150 mm	200 kW, 210 kW, 220 kW, 260 kW		
405.120	U 300	UGN	OM 904 LA	3600 mm	110 kW, 130 kW, 170 kW	294	Production ceased
405.121	U 300	UGN	OM 904 LA	3600 mm	110 kW, 115 kW, 130 kW	135	Production ceased
405.122	U 400	UGN	OM 906 LA	3600 mm	125 kW, 130 kW, 170 kW, 205 kW	1.147	Production ceased
405.123	U 400	UGN	OM 904 LA	3600 mm	130 kW, 175 kW, 210 kW	707	Production ceased
405.125	U 327, U 423, U 427, U 429, U 430, U 435	UGE	OM 934 LA	3600 mm	170 kW, 200 kW, 210 kW, 220 kW, 260 kW		
405.200	U 500	UGN	OM 906 LA	3350 mm	170 kW, 205 kW	457	Production ceased
405.201	U 500	UGN	OM 906 LA	3350 mm	175 kW, 210 kW	740	Production ceased
405.202	U 527, U 529, U 530, U 535	UGE	OM 936 LA	3350 mm	200 kW, 210 kW, 220 kW, 260 kW		
405.210	U 500	UGN	OM 906 LA	3080 mm	194 kW	29	Production ceased; sold as Freightliner Unimog U 500 (2002–2007)
405.220	U 500	UGN	OM 906 LA	3900 mm	170 kW, 205 kW	468	Production ceased
405.221	U 500	UGN	OM 906 LA	3900 mm	175 kW, 210 kW	570	Production ceased
405.222	U 527, U 529, U 530, U 535	UGE	OM 936 LA	3900 mm	200 kW, 210 kW, 220 kW, 260 kW		
405.230	U 500	UGN	OM 906 LA	3900 mm	194 kW	154	Production ceased; sold as Freightliner Unimog U 500, 2002–2007

Figures of UGN and LUG according to Unimog engineer Achim Vogt

=== Brabus Unimog U 500 Black Edition ===
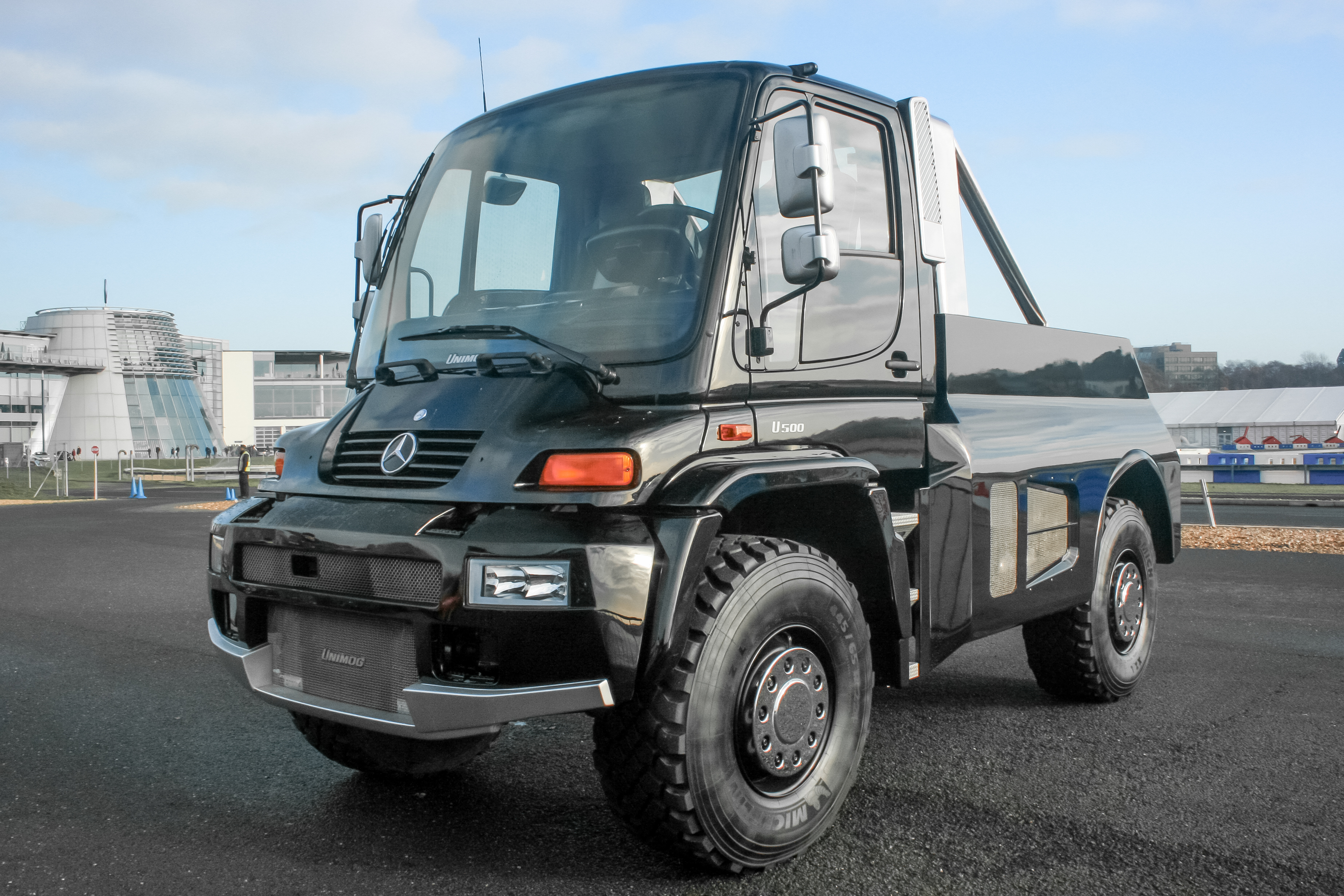
Brabus Unimog U 500 Black Edition

In December 2005, Mercedes-Benz presented the Brabus Unimog U 500 Black Edition at the Dubai Motor Show. The Brabus Unimog U 500 Black Edition is a luxury version of the Unimog, heavily modified by Brabus. It features chrome bumpers, exhaust tips, an all-black exterior, new body panels, and a giant steel rollover protection bar. The interior panels are made of carbon fiber, and the upholstery is made of alcantara, leather, and luxurious cloth. The windows are tinted. Many interior parts – such as the infotainment system, sound system, and steering wheel – were also used in the contemporary Mercedes-Benz S-Class, the W 220. Although based on the U 500 model, the Brabus Unimog U 500 Black Edition has the maximum permissible mass rating of the Unimog U 400, which is 11,990 kg. It is equipped with the 205 kW version of the OM 906 six-cylinder engine and the automatic shifting option for the gearbox; the top speed is 120 km/h. In late 2005, Mercedes-Benz announced that the Brabus Unimog U 500 Black Edition would be put into series production if demand for the vehicle existed. One year later, German news paper Die Welt wrote that six Unimog U Black Edition were sold, with three being in production. The total production figure was said to be not greater than ten.

=== 404-based 405.110 ===
In the 1950s and 1960s, former Daimler-Benz AG used the Unimog U 405.110 types' designation for a prototype of an armoured personnel carrier, based on the Unimog 404 chassis. Although bearing the same fundamental design principle, the 404-based Unimog 405.110 is technically very different from the modern Unimog 405, and thus not included in the Unimog 405 family.

== History ==
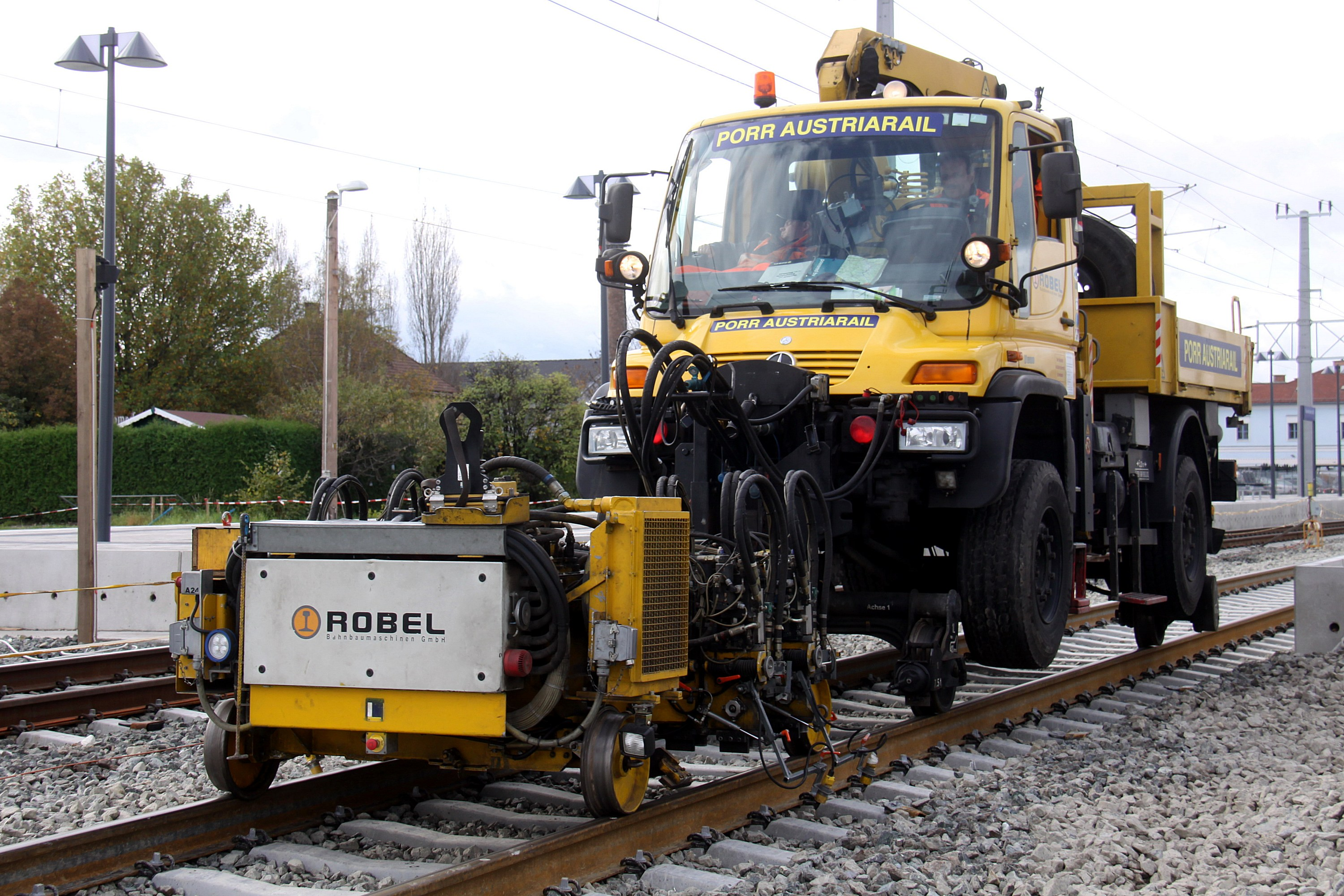
Road-rail Unimog 405

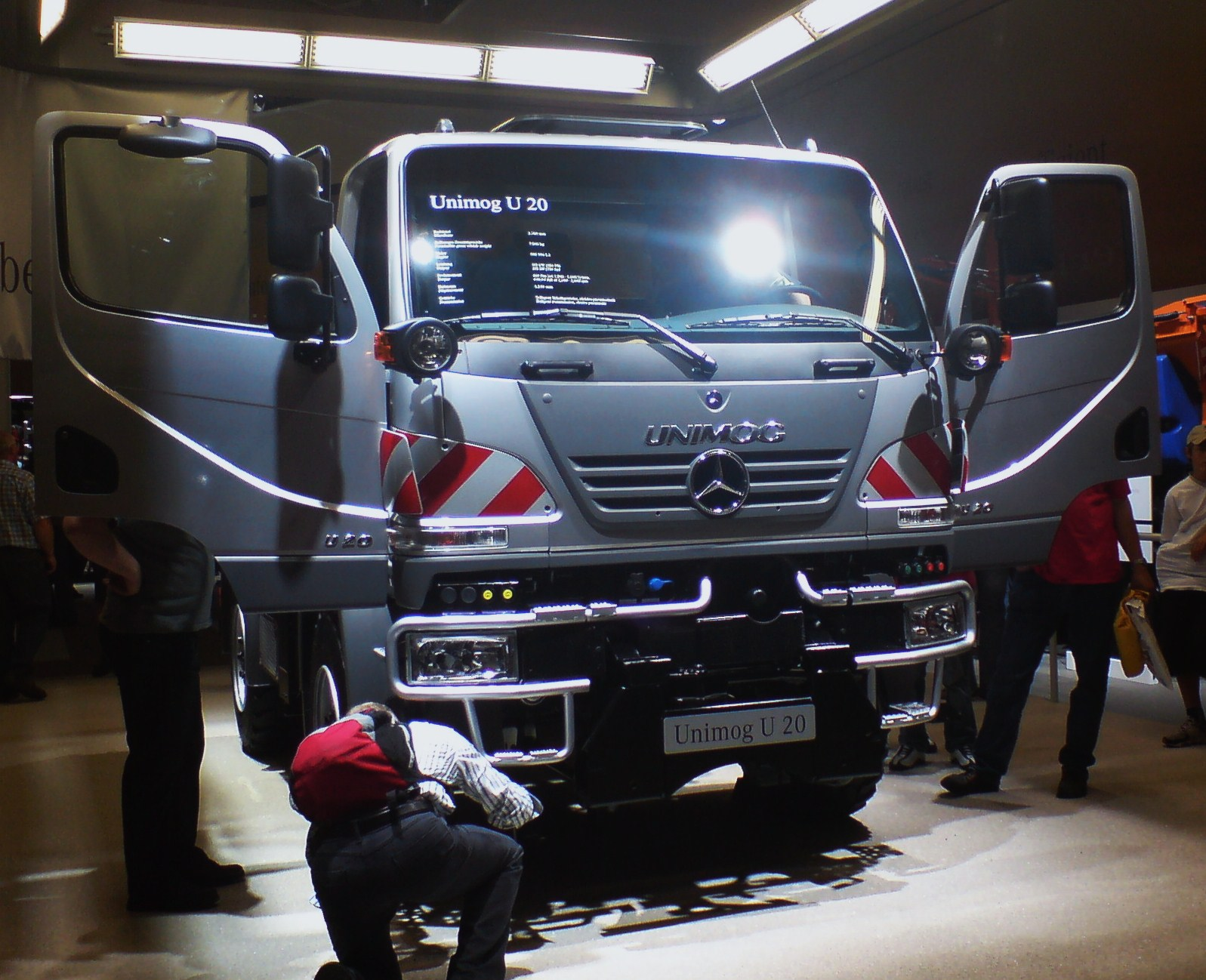
Unimog U 20 presentation at IAA 2006

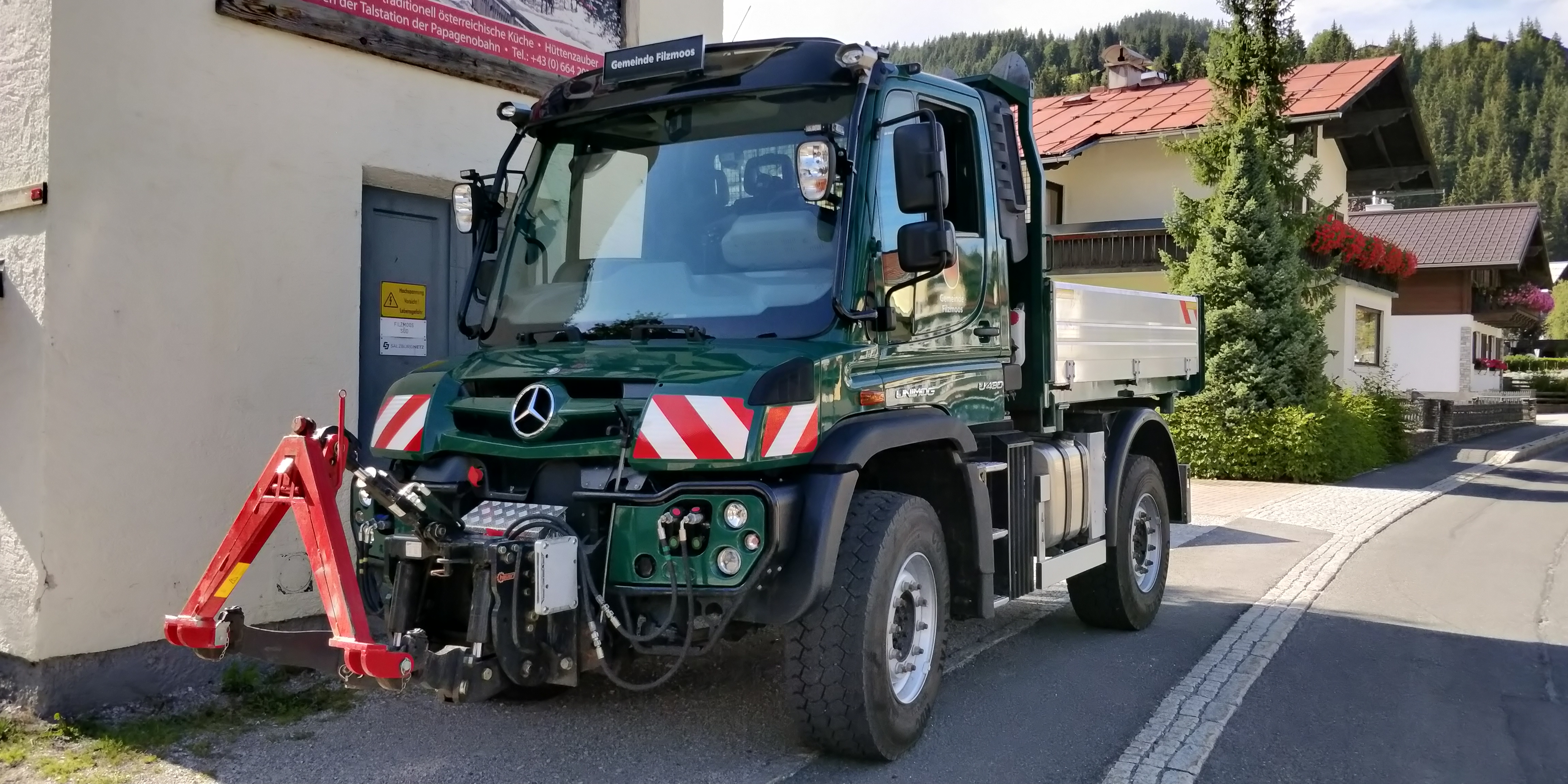
Unimog U 430 (UGE)

=== 1994 – 2000: Development phase ===
The planning of the Unimog 405 project began in 1994. According to Unimog engineer Carl-Heinz Vogler, a market analysis showed that Unimog customers demanded a more dedicated implement carrier version of the Unimog. At Daimler-Benz it was decided to make a forward-control vehicle with reduced off-road capability but improved implement carrier capabilities. This marks a paradigmatic change in Unimog design. The new Unimog series was supposed to have four options for mounting implements: In front, in back, on the bed, and in between the axles. Also, the new implement carrier Unimog, which would later become the 405, was planned to have a much more sophisticated single- or dual-circuit hydraulics system than previous Unimogs. Eventually, in 1996, the board of directors and the works council agreed upon developing and producing the new Unimog series at the Mercedes-Benz-Werk Gaggenau. Original development was carried out within 39 months, from 1996 until 2000. Former DaimlerChrysler developed a product requirements document together with selected customers and equipment manufacturers. Key points were, among others, increased driver comfort and functionality, one-man operation, increased payload, tractor operation, road-rail operation, compatibility with existing tools, and increased economy. DaimlerChrysler engineers used computerised design tools such as CAD, FEM, as well as driving dynamics and road simulation in the Unimog 405's development; previous Unimog series – such as the Unimog 406 – were mostly developed with conventional (i.e. largely non-computerised) engineering methods. (Note: In his 2016 book "Unimog 406 – Typengeschichte und Technik", Unimog engineer Carl-Heinz Vogler describes that 3 m² drafting tables were used in Unimog 406 design, cf. Vogler, Carl-Heinz (2016). Unimog 406 Typengeschichte und Technik (in German). München. p. 6. ISBN 978-3-86245-576-8. OCLC 949783030.)

=== 2000 – 2007: Introduction of the UGN ===
In March 2000, the Unimog 405 was officially presented to the public as the new Unimog implement carrier (UGN). Series production of the U 300 and U 400 models commenced in April 2000; the U 500 model followed in February 2001. In 2002, the Unimog 405 was introduced in North America as the Freightliner Unimog U 500 for the 2003 model year. During summer that year, production was moved from Gaggenau to Wörth am Rhein. On 26 August 2002, the first Unimog 405 – a U 400 – rolled off the Wörth plant's assembly line. DaimlerChrysler designed two types specifically for the North American market, the 405.210 short wheelbase type and 405.230 long wheelbase type. They have about 500 parts that are different compared to the German Unimog 405 types, most notably, an OM 906 engine tuned to comply with US emissions regulations. In 2007, the Unimog 405 was discontinued in the United States. In total, 183 units were made.

=== 2006 – 2014: Changes to the UGN and short-lived LUG ===
2006 brought changes to European motor vehicle legislation which eventually resulted in the Unimog 405 being updated. To comply with the then-new Euro IV emissions standard, the Unimog 405 was equipped with a selective catalytic reduction catalyst. DaimlerChrysler incremented the types's designations by one, e.g. the 405.100 became the 405.101.

In September 2006, the Unimog U 20 was presented at the 61st IAA-Nutzfahrzeuge in Hannover. Series production eventually commenced on 23 October 2007, and the first U 20 was delivered in January 2008. Daimler discontinued the Unimog U 20 in 2014 when the Euro VI emissions standard came into effect. It was succeeded by the U 216 and U 218 models, which are slightly bigger in size.

=== 2013 – present: UGE ===
In April 2013, Daimler AG introduced the UGE variant of the Unimog 405. The UGE is technically similar to the UGN, but comes standard with the OM 934 or OM 936 engines, and has a different exterior styling. The model naming scheme was changed with the UGE, as described above. Series production began on 22 August 2013. In summer 2021, Daimler Truck Holding presented new top models of the Unimog 405 range, the U 435 and the U 535. They are fitted with a Euro VIe-compliant version of the OM 936 Diesel engine that is rated at 260 kW, which is a boost in power of 40 kW compared to the previous top models, the U 430 and U 530. The increase in power was achieved by increasing the BMEP to 2.25 MPa. To manage the high torque output, Daimler Truck Holding designed a new gearbox for the U 435 and U 535 models, the UG 130. Another new feature to the Unimog 405 range is the optional, self-levelling hydropneumatic suspension. The U 435 and U 535 models were made available in early 2022. Also in 2022, the U 327 model was added to the lighter U 3xx model range. Technically, it is an Unimog U 427. It has the Unimog U 427's axles, dimensions, and is equipped with the 200 kW version of the straight-6 OM 936 Diesel engine. Previously, the U 2xx and U 3xx models were only offered with 110, 115, 130 or the 170 kW engine options.

== Technical description ==
Unlike previous Unimogs, the Unimog 405 is, seen from a technical perspective, primarily designed as a two-axle, off-road capable implement carrier rather than a dedicated off-road vehicle that can mount implements. The payload is also significantly greater than in previous Unimogs; the total permissible mass of the Unimog 405 is up to 16,500 kg. This is primarily achieved through the Unimog 405's frame and axle design.

=== Chassis ===
The Unimog 405 has a conventional flat ladder frame made from E 500 TM HSLA steel. It was designed using FEM technology. Like in conventional lorries, the frame has bolted closed cross profiles which result in a high torsion stiffness. This allows more payload than the bent frame of previous Unimogs. DaimlerChrysler designed the frame with different length and wheelbase options. The axles are coil-sprung portal axles with hydraulic shock absorbers, and have dedicated transverse and longitudinal control arms as well as a pair of longitudinal control arms with an integrated roll stabiliser. This is different from previous Unimogs in which torque tubes are used as longitudinal control arms. This design gives the Unimog 405 a significantly improved onroad handling.

In total, DaimlerChrysler designed six different axles with two different axle load capabilities for the Unimog 405: The AU4 and HU4 front- and rear axles for the U 2xx and U 3xx models, the AU5 and HU5 front- and rear axles for the U 4xx and U 500 models, and the AU6 and HU6 front- and rear axles for the U 527 / U 530 / U 535. The latter four axles make the frame sit slightly higher (30 mm). The track width of 1734 mm / 1768 mm is narrow enough for road-rail use. The U 4xx and U 5xx models can be equipped with two AU5 front axles as a factory option (to enable all-wheel steering), and are also available with hydropneumatic axle suspenstion instead of traditional coil spring suspension. Many Unimog 405 models come standard with 315/80 R 22.5 tyres, but smaller and larger tyres can also be fitted to the 405. A tyre pressure control system is not standard, but available as a factory option. The UGN U 300 has a combined hydraulic/pneumatic braking system; all other models are equipped with a solely pneumatic braking system. The Unimog 405 has disc brakes on all wheels, and automatic load-dependent brake force control (ALB) as well as anti-lock braking (ABS). The parking brake is spring-loaded, and acts on the rear wheels. The centre, rear axle, and front axle differentials are lockable to allow different amounts of torque to be sent to the wheels.

The 405 has a hydraulically power-assisted, LS 6 Bk recirculating ball steering system. The reduction ($i$) of the steering gearbox is steer angle dependent to improve handling at high speeds and maneuvering in tight spots. In its default configuration, the Unimog 405 is a left-hand drive vehicle. An either-hand drive version – which can be switched, by the driver, with a simple "flick of the wrist" from left-hand drive to right-hand drive (and vice versa) – is available as a factory option. In the either-hand drive version, the entire steering column, gauge cluster, and pedals can be moved by the driver without special tools.

=== Cab ===
The Unimog 405 has been made with two different cabs, a forward-control cab (LUG variant) and a short-bonnet cab (UGN and UGE variants). Both cabs have one-row seating; a crew cab is not available from the factory.

==== UGN and UGE ====
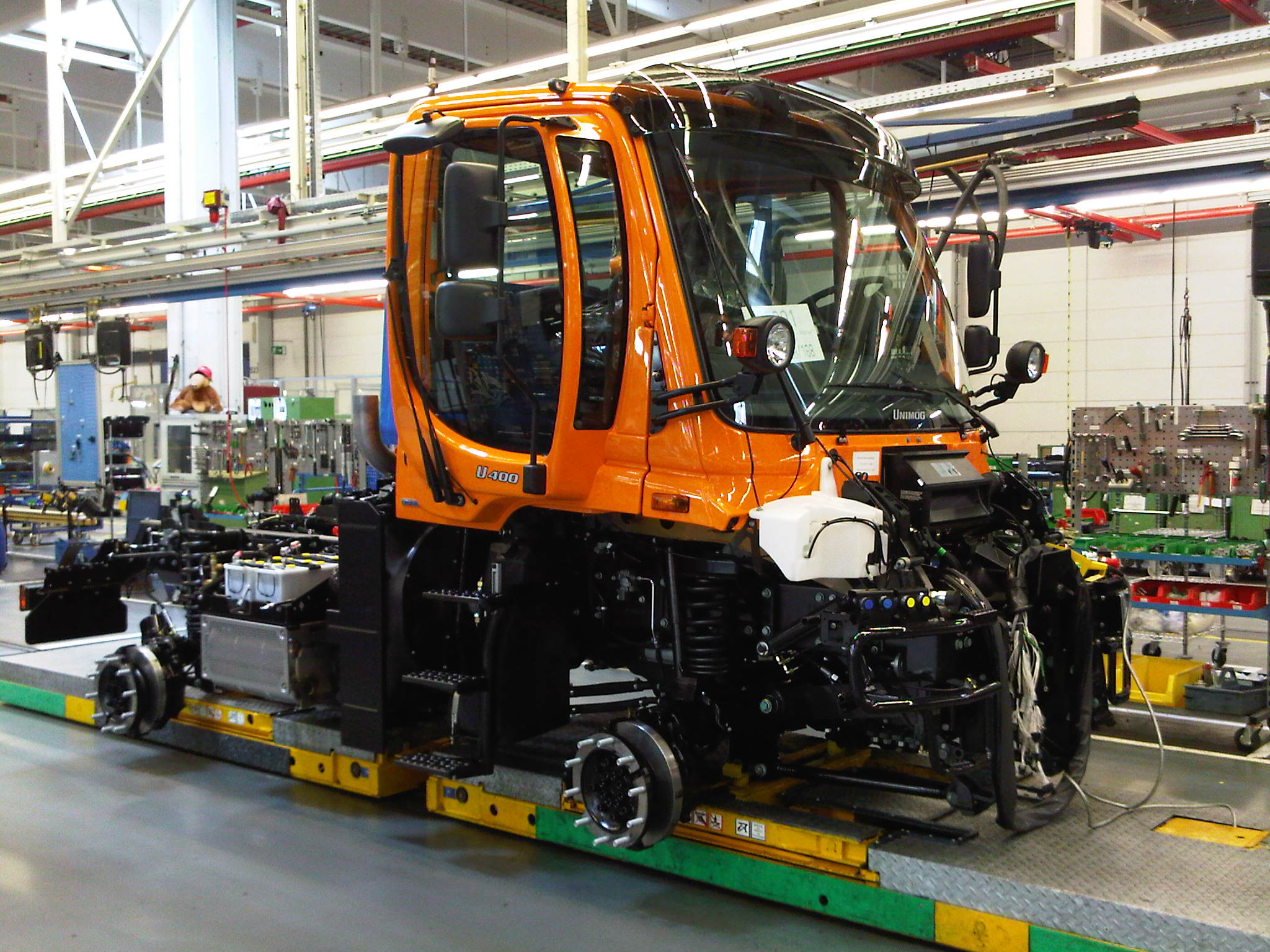
Unimog UGN variant with an extending passenger side door

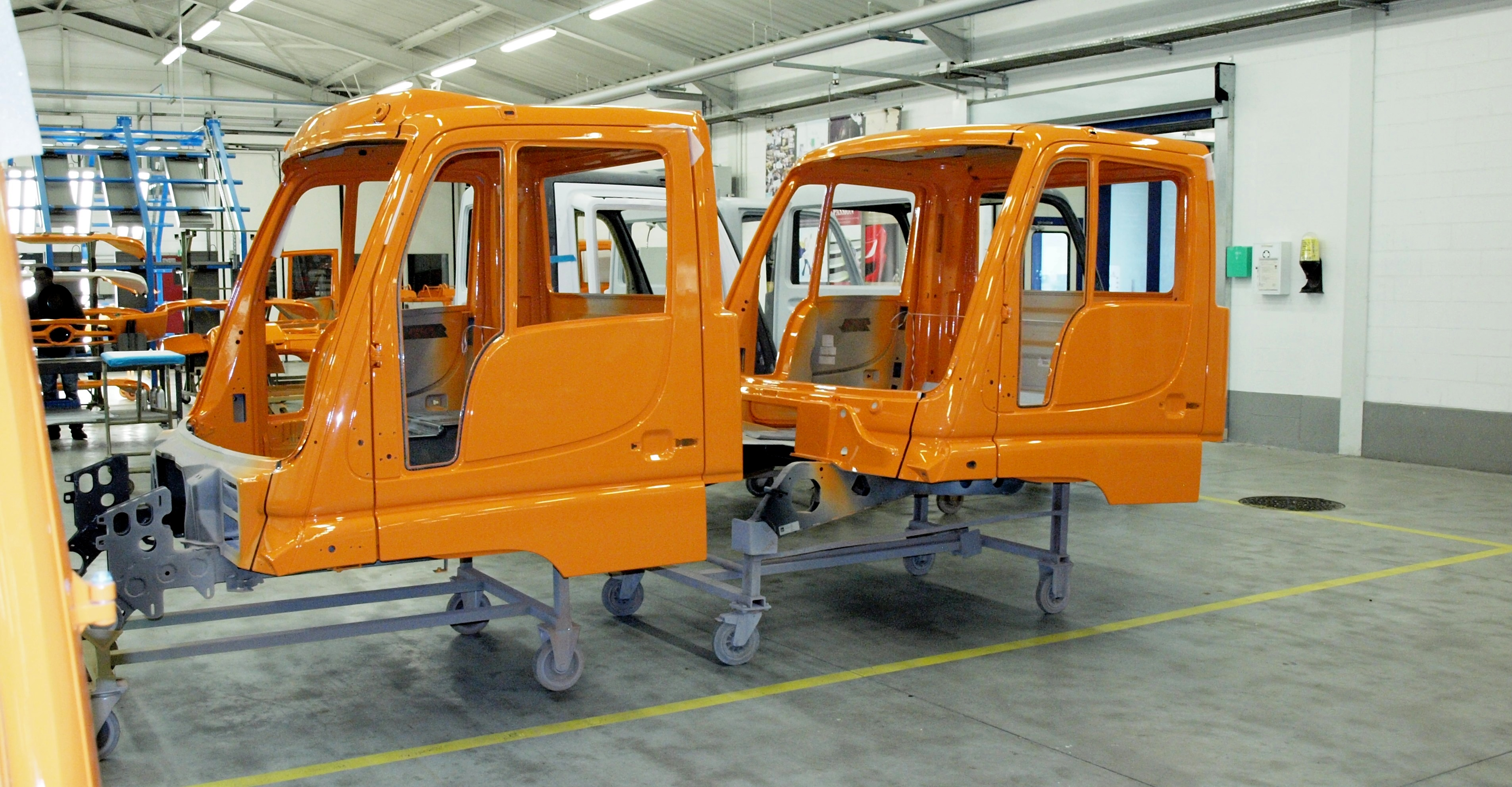
Unimog 405 cabs

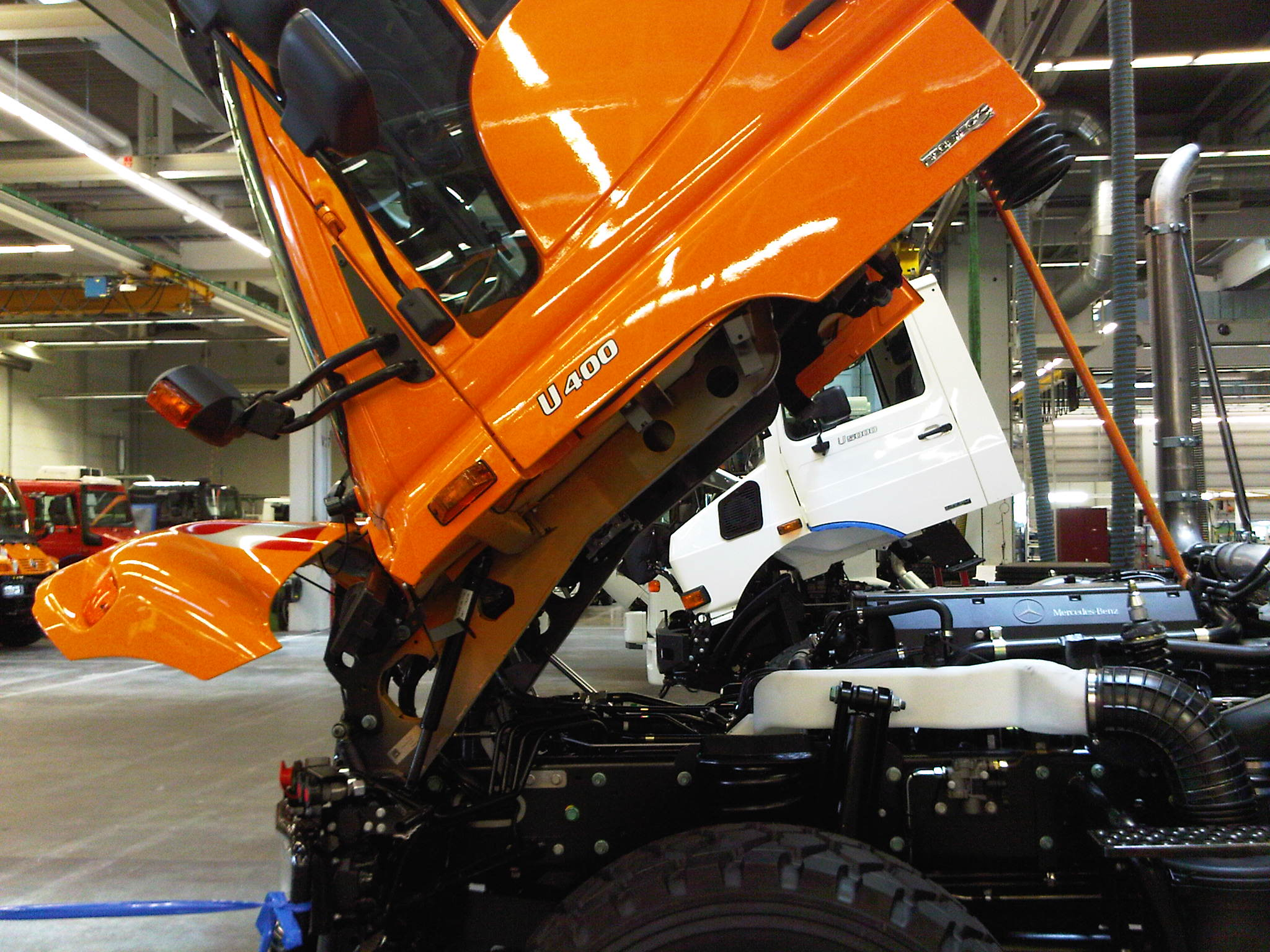
The cab can be tilted for maintenance

The cab found in the UGN and UGE variants was developed by Dornier Consulting. It makes the 405 a short-bonnet lorry with the engine installed just below the cab. The bonnet is unusually short and steep for a short-bonnet lorry, and the cab is fitted with a rather large, slightly curved but almost upright windscreen. This design does not only enable good forward visibility, but also allows the driver to sit behind the front axle for better 360° visibility. The bonnet's steepness is possible because the engine radiators are installed behind the front wheels, and not underneath the bonnet.

The cab is made of fibre-reinforced polymer (FRP), which makes the cab light, stiff, and rigid, and allows unconventionally shaped body parts that would not be possible if the cab was made of steel. The polymers used are carbon-based, and the fibres are conventional glass fibres. In total, the cab is made of only ten different types of body parts (14 body parts in total) that are glued together in the Unimog plant in Wörth. For maintenance, the cab can be tilted. An "extending" (Note: Wischhof et al. refer to this door as the mowing door (German: Mähtür), because it was specifically designed for mowbar operators; cf. Wischhof et al. (2000), p. 862) passenger side door – which gives an implement operator better visibility – was available as a factory option. A major difference between the – otherwise more or less identical UGN and UGE cabs – is the windscreen wiper design. In the UGN, the windscreen wipers are installed below the windscreen, whereas the UGE variant has them installed above the windscreen.

==== LUG ====
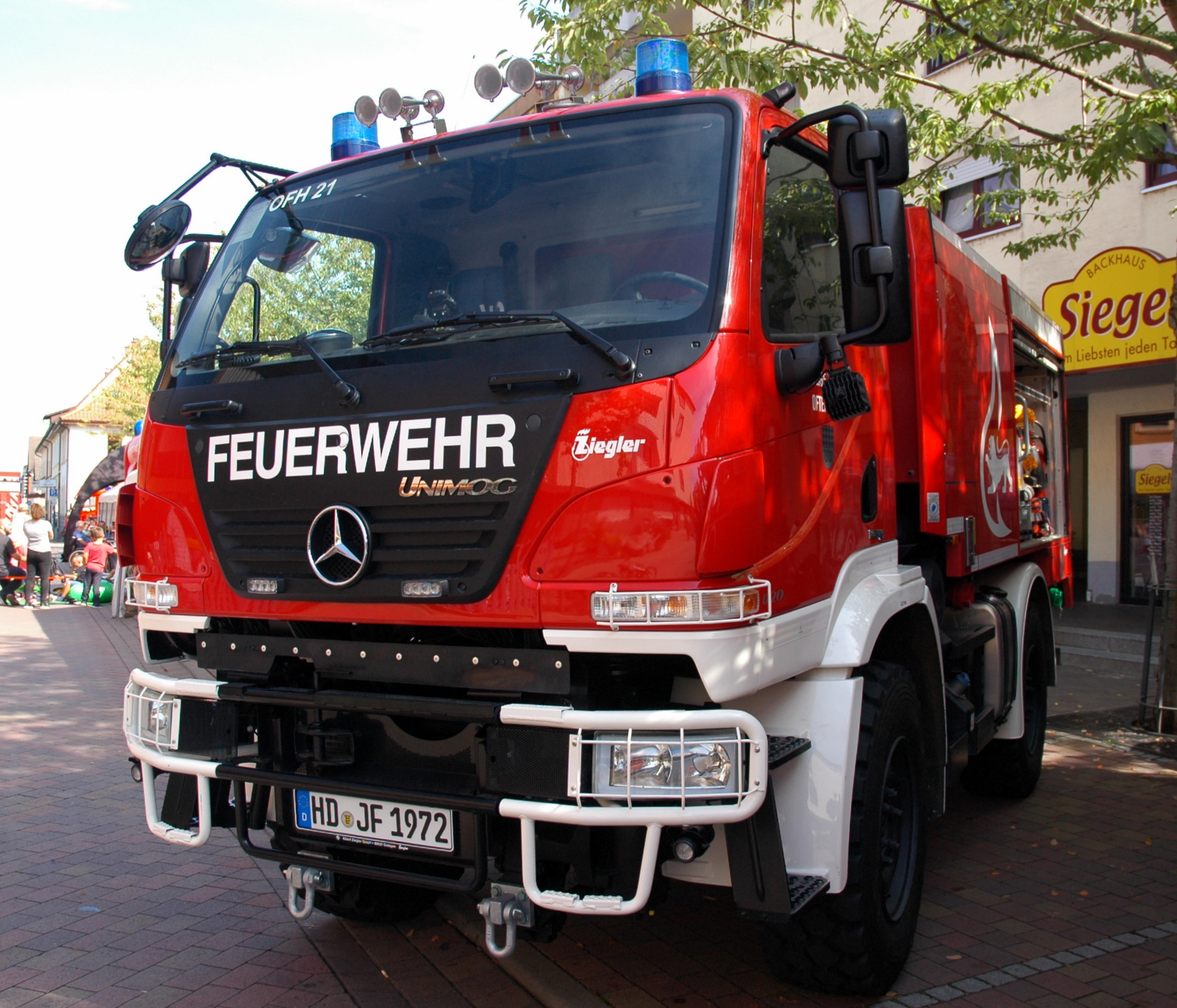
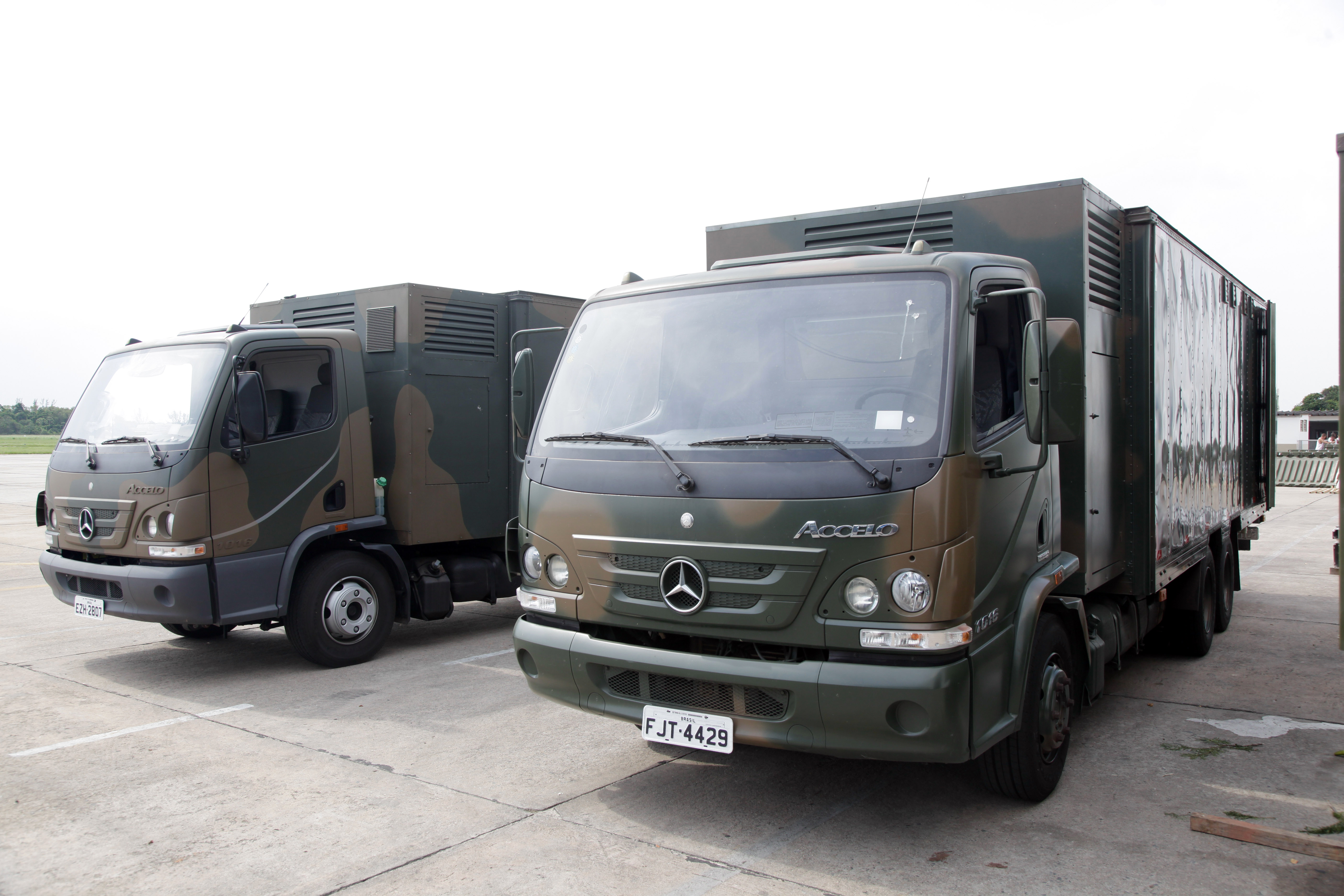
The Unimog 405.050 (left) shares its cab with the Mercedes-Benz Accelo lorry (right)

With the Unimog U 20 type 405.050 LUG variant of the Unimog 405, Daimler introduced the first forward-control Unimog. (Note: The Unimog U 20 is the first series production forward control Unimog. In 1969, Daimler-Benz presented an Unimog 416 prototype that had the forward-control cab of the Mercedes-Benz L 314 lorry instead of the Unimog 406 cab. The forward-control 416 was not put into series production; cf. Michael Wessel: Vor 50 Jahren vorgestellt: Unimog mit Lkw-Fahrerhaus, Badisches Tageblatt, 23 December 2019) It shares its cab with the Mercedes-Benz Accelo lorry. Compared with other 405s, the U 20's cab is 110 mm shorter, and installed much more up front. Therefore, the U 20's front overhang is about 200 mm longer, and the driver's seat is installed approximately 600 mm further forward. Unlike the conventional cab, the U 20 cab is made of steel. It was made in Brazil and shipped to Wörth for assembly.

=== Gearbox and drivetrain ===
==== Powertrain principle ====
The Unimog 405 has a powertrain principle with two mechanical torque paths; a third, hydraulic torque take-off is available as a factory option. The mechanical torque path is designed with two gearboxes, one up front and one centre gearbox; the engine is installed in between these gearboxes. While the torque sent to the front gearbox can only be sent to front implements (with the front PTO), the torque sent to the centre gearbox can be sent into three different paths: To a direct engine power take-off, for instance, for powering hydraulic systems; to either low or high-speed implements such as crane/excavator implements or firebrigade centrifugal pumps; and to the wheels. Unlike previous Unimogs, which have switchable all-wheel drive, the Unimog 405 has permanent all-wheel drive.

==== UG 100/8 gearbox ====
Except for the U 535 and U 435, all Unimog 405 models have a synchromesh UG 100/8 gearbox with helical cut gears and electronically controlled, pneumatic shifting with manual gear selection. This gearbox has a modular design and allows various different factory options. In its base configuration, the gearbox has four gears and two ranges. A separate reverse gear unit is flange-mounted to the UG 100/8 gearbox. This design results in eight forward and eight reverse gears. The reverse gear unit has a different gear ratio for the reverse range, and the last two gears are electronically locked by default to prevent reverse speeds beyond 30 km/h. In road-rail Unimogs, all reverse gears are usable; the highest reverse speed is 61.9 km/h.

By default, the UG 100/8 gearbox is mated with a single-disc dry clutch (i.e. foot-operated with a clutch pedal). An additional three range gearbox – giving the Unimog dedicated drive, work, and crawl ranges – is available as a factory option; it extends the number of gears to 24 forward and 24 reverse (of which, as described, two are electronically locked). With the additional three range gearbox, the speed range is 0.1–85 km/h; (Note: Some models have been offered with an 89 km/h top speed, cf. Daimler Truck Holding AG: Unimog implement carrier transmissions) the top speed is electronically limited.

==== UG 130 gearbox ====
The UG 130 gearbox is the standard gearbox in the U 535 and U 435 models. It is similar to the UG 100 gearbox in terms of design, but is capable of accepting a higher input torque of around 1300 N·m.

==== Hydrodynamic torque converter and dry single-disc clutch ====
For road-rail use, the Unimog 405 is offered with a combined dry single-disc clutch and hydrodynamic torque converter. (Note: Daimler Truck Holding refers to this system as the "converter-clutch unit"; cf. Daimler Truck Holding AG: Unimog implement carrier transmissions; ZF calls it the Torque Converter Clutch, cf. TraXon with Torque Converter Clutch; in German-language scientific literature, (cf. Wischhof et al. p. 690) this is called a Wandlerschaltkupplung (abbreviated as WSK), which roughly translates into English as "(hydrodynamic torque) converter shifting clutch") From the engine, the torque is sent to the hydrodynamic torque converter which provides a two-times torque multiplication, before the torque is sent through the dry single-disc clutch to the gearbox. This design allows setting off with a very high tow hitch load (e.g. laden trucks) without wearing out the dry single-disc clutch. When a certain speed is reached, a lock-up clutch in the hydrodynamic torque converter is engaged, and only the dry single-disc clutch is used for transmitting torque to the gearbox. Unimogs equipped with this system have automatic clutch actuation, and, therefore, have no clutch pedal; gear shifting is still manual. An automated version of the gearbox is available as a factory option.

==== Hydrostatic drive ====
A hydrostatic drive is available as a factory option. It is flange-mounted to the UG 100/8 gearbox and fully independent of the engine (and thus front PTO) speed. Its electronic control system allows indefinitely adjustable speeds of 0...25 km/h, (Note: In newer models, the speed range is 0–50 km/h, cf. Daimler Truck Holding: EasyDrive) and it is operated either by a hand lever, or with the accelerator pedal.

==== Front PTO gearbox ====
The front gearbox is a single-speed gearbox with a reduction of $i=2.139$, resulting in a rated PTO speed of 1000/min. Torque is sent to this gearbox through a driveshaft, directly from the engine. To disengage the front gearbox, it is equipped with a torsion clutch and a hydraulic multiplate clutch. The PTO speed can be electronically locked at 540/min; the maximum take-off power is 150 kW.

=== Engines ===
The Unimog 405 is powered by Mercedes-Benz OM 900 series engines. The OM 900 series consists of four- and six-cylinder Diesel engines and has been made in several different versions. In the Unimog 405, the OM 904, OM 906, OM 934, and OM 936 have been used.

==== OM 904 and OM 906 ====
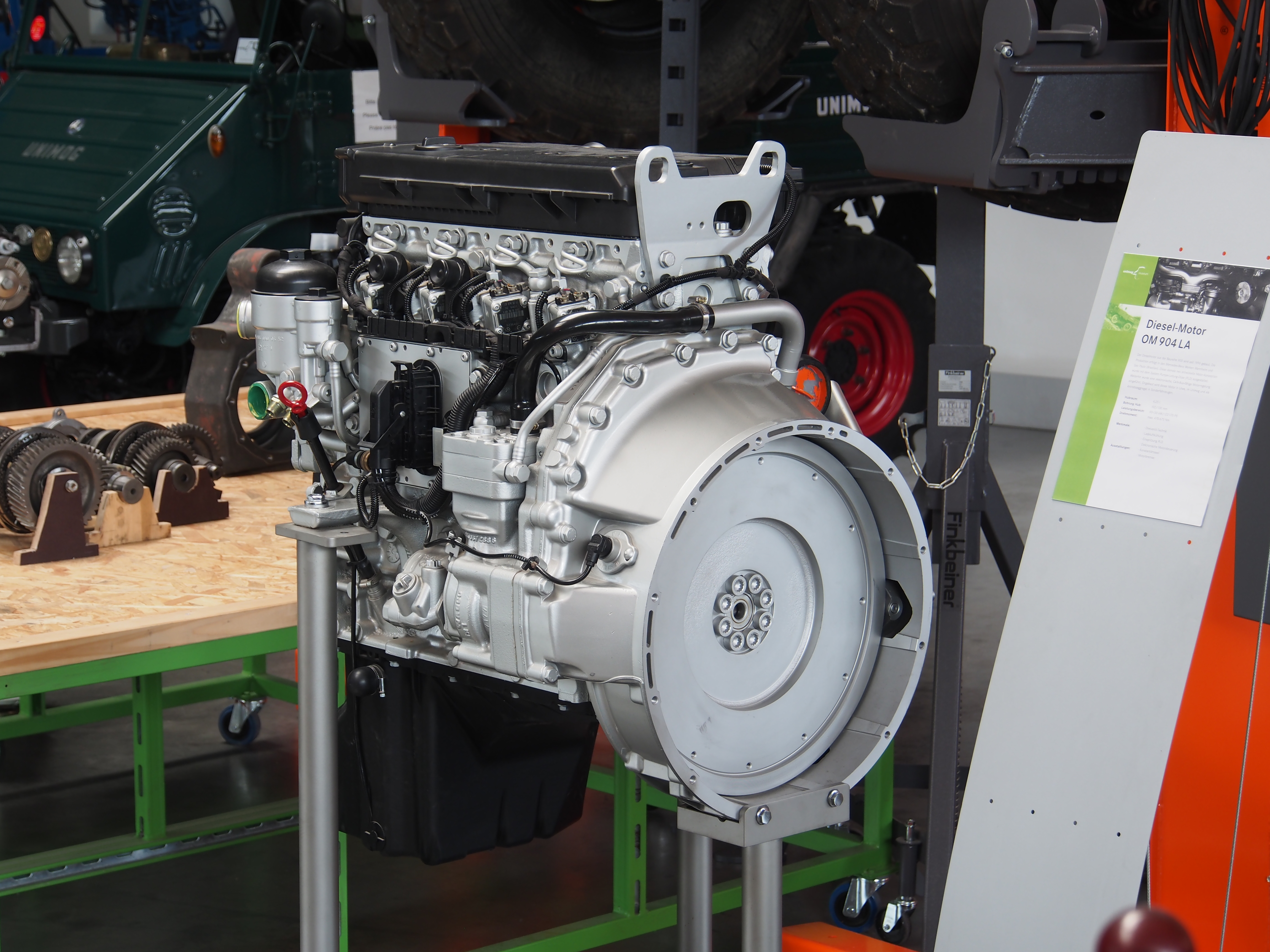
OM 904 engine on static display at the Unimog Museum in Gaggenau

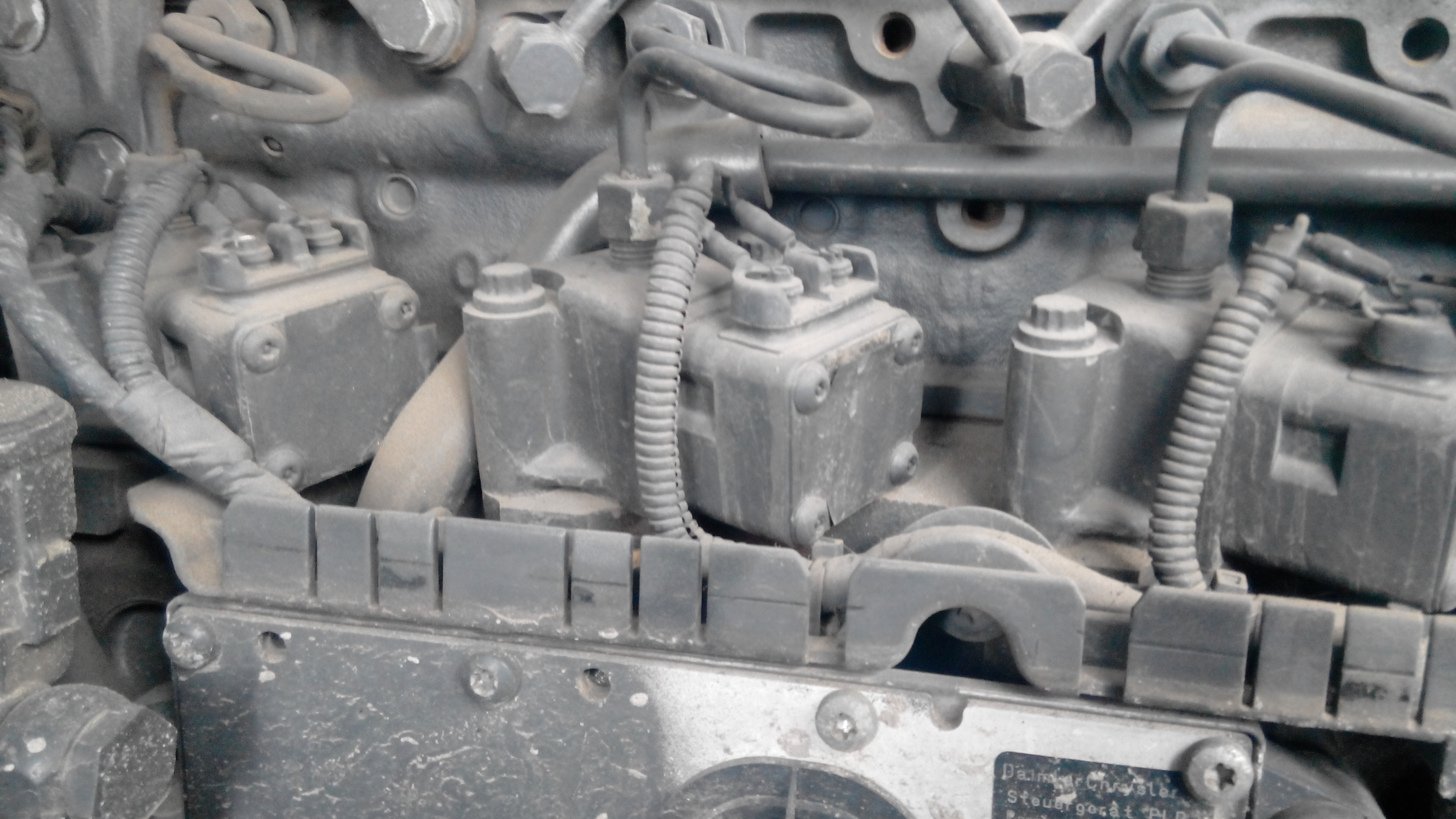
The OM 904 and OM 906 have a unit injection pump system which can be seen in this picture. Each cylinder is fitted with a separate unit injection pump that is connected to the fuel injector with a short, spiral fuel line

The OM 904 four-cylinder and OM 906 six-cylinder engines were the first OM 900 series engines, introduced in 1996. They have a 102 mm cylinder bore and 130 mm piston stroke, resulting in a displacement of 4249 cm³ (OM 904) or 6374 cm³ (OM 906). Both engine models share the same design principle; they are water-cooled straight engines with a reverse-flow cylinder head made of cast iron. The OM 904/906 has a three-valve OHV valvetrain, with two intake valves, and one exhaust valve per cylinder. In addition to that, the engine has a decompression valve and an exhaust throttle valve for engine braking. The valves are actuated by an in-block camshaft, pushrods, and rocker arms.

Instead of a conventional injection pump, the OM 904/906 engines have a unit injection pump system with one unit injection pump per cylinder. The unit injection pump creates the injection pressure with a camshaft-driven plunger. The actual fuel injector is connected to the unit injection pump with a short fuel line. This is different from Volkswagen's Pumpe-Düse system that combines the fuel injector and the unit injection pump into a single unit injector device. Nonetheless, the Mercedes-Benz unit injection pump system also has electronically actuated solenoid valves that can be freely actuated during the unit injection pump plunger actuation, allowing multiple injections per power stroke. The highest injection pressure is up to 160 MPa. In order to achieve high efficiency, Daimler-Benz installed a single wastegate turbocharger and an air-to-air intercooler. The turbocharger's exhaust turbine is relatively small to achieve good turbo response; it has a fixed turbine geometry, and a wastegate. At 1300/min, the OM 906's BMEP reaches its maximum of 2.17 MPa which is achieved through a high turbo boost of 285 kPa.

The rated fuel consumption of the OM 906 is 188 g/(kW·h) at 1450/min and a BMEP of 1.6 MPa. When the Unimog 405 was first introduced, it was available with the 110 and 130 kW versions of the OM 904, and the 170 and 205 kW versions of the OM 906, which were all Euro-III compliant. Throughout the vehicle's production run, all engines were increased in power by 5 kW (except for the 130 kW version), and updated to comply with the Euro IV and V emissions standards. For reducing nitrogen oxides from the exhaust, the Euro IV and V models were fitted with a selective catalytic reduction device. The Freightliner Unimog has an OM 906 engine detuned to 194 kW to comply with the EPA4 emissions standard. It was not updated to a newer emissions standard, because DaimlerChrysler discontinued the Unimog on the North American market in 2007, prior to the EPA7 emission standard taking effect. Both the OM 904 and the OM 906 can operate on diesel fuel, or rapeseed oil methyl esters (RME).

==== OM 934 and OM 936 ====
In 2012, Daimler AG introduced the Euro VI OM 934 and OM 936 Diesel engines, which succeeded the OM 904 and OM 906 Diesel engines. Daimler has been using the OM 934/936 in the Unimog 405 since 2013; the engines are offered with power outputs of 115, 130, 170 (OM 934), or 200, 220, and 260 kW (OM 936). The maximum engine braking power is 178 kW (OM 934) / 302 kW (OM 936). As in the predecessor engine family, the OM 934 and OM 936 share their basic design with a 110 mm bore and a 135 mm stroke, resulting in displacements of 5132 cm³ (OM 934) or 7698 cm³ (OM 936). The compression is ε=17.6, and the engines are turbocharged. Instead of the unit injection pump system, the engines feature a common-rail injection system with electronically controlled solenoid valves and an injection pressure of up to 240 MPa. This system allows up to five injections per power stroke. The cylinder head design is also vastly different from the OM 904/906. Daimler designed the new engines with a crossflow cylinder head with dual overhead camshafts and four valves per cylinder. The exhaust camshaft is fitted with the variable valve timing system from the Mercedes-Benz M 272 V6 Otto engine. The variable valve timing is used in the exhaust gas treatment system for increasing exhaust gas temperatures. Daimler fitted the engine with a diesel particulate filter and selective catalytic reduction.

=== Hydraulic system ===
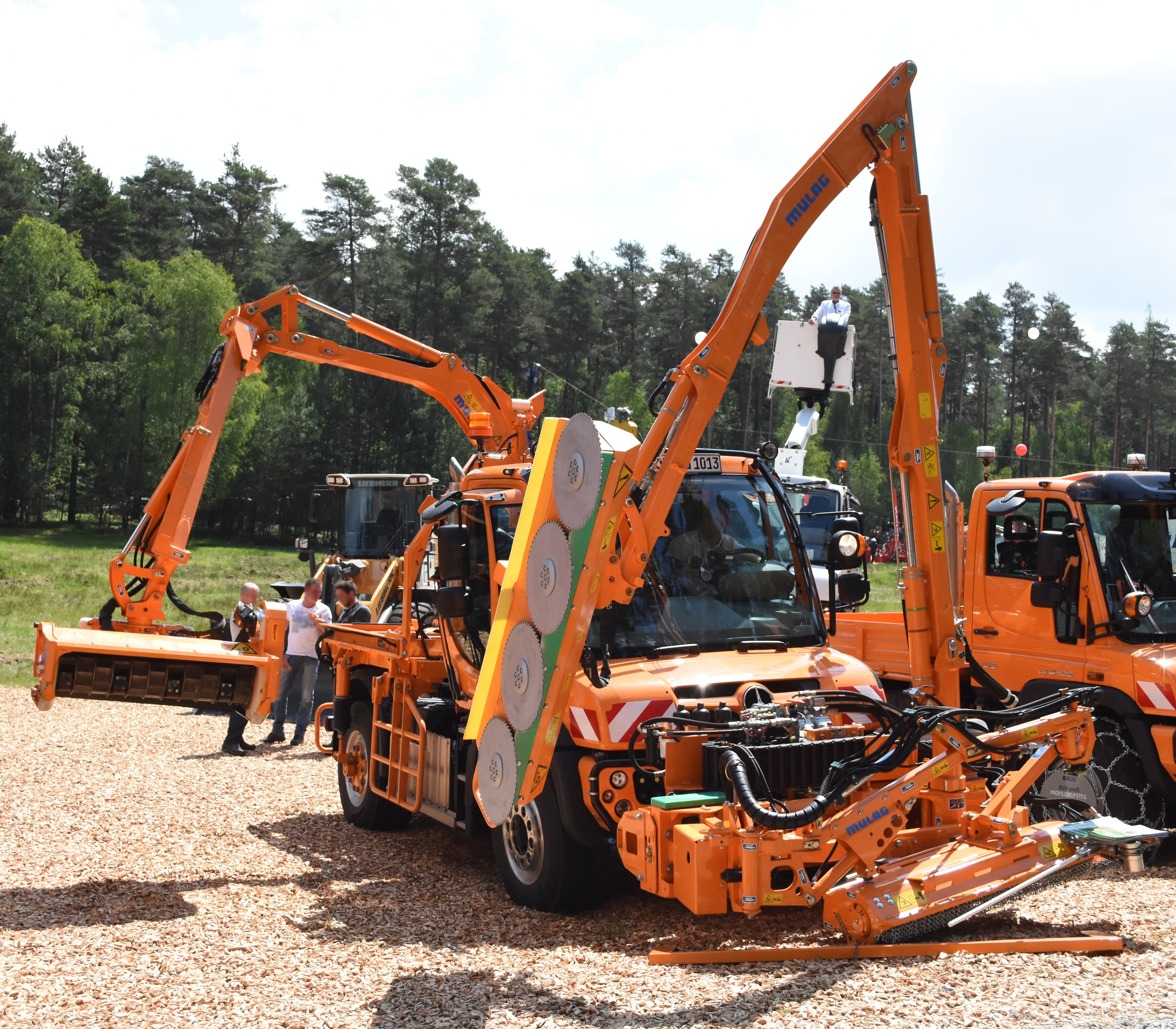
The Unimog 405 can be fitted with various hydraulically powered implements such as mowers, as depicted in this image

The Unimog 405 can be equipped with two hydraulic systems, the power hydraulic system and the implement hydraulic system. Both of these systems have two hydraulic circuits, giving the Unimog 405 four independent hydraulic circuits in total. The combined total power output of the hydraulic system is 130 kW. Excess energy in the hydraulic system that is not converted into mechanical work is dissipated with a hydraulic oil cooler. A joystick is used for operating the hydraulic system.

==== Power hydraulic system ====
The power hydraulic system is designed for implements that require continuous high power in the 40 kW range. It is installed below the bed area, in between the longitudinal frame members, and can be uninstalled whenever it is not required. Unlike the implement hydraulic system, the power hydraulic system is permanently powered through a driveshaft from the engine, and thus independent of the selected gear or vehicle speed. The power hydraulic system has an open, and a closed hydraulic circuit. In the open circuit, a high volumetric flow rate is maintained which requires a big hydraulic oil reservoir. It is used for powering implements that require the aforementioned high volumetric flow rate, such as hydraulic cylinders in excavator or crane implements. Implements that do not require a high volume flow rate can be powered with the more compact closed circuit.

==== Implement hydraulic system ====
The implement hydraulic system is designed for powering smaller implements used with the Unimog 405. Different numbers of hydraulic pumps and different numbers of hydraulic valves can be fitted to the hydraulic circuits in the system to match implement requirements. The power output is relatively low, at <20 kW per circuit.

=== Electric and electronical systems ===
The Unimog 405 has a 24 V electrical system. It comes standard with a three-phase AC 28 V alternator that provides a current of 80 A; 100 A is available as a factory option. As is standard in many lorries, the Unimog 405 has two 12 V lead acid batteries in a series circuit. The amount of electric charge the batteries can provide is 115 A·h; 135 A·h batteries are also available. For powering implements, Unimog 405 models are equipped with 12 V or 24 V sockets in the front bumper, in the cab, at the rear, and the battery box (that is installed behind the cab). All Unimog 405 models have a CAN bus system and electronic control units for the engine, the instrument cluster, the gearbox, all power take-off systems, and a separate electronic tachograph. Both the accelerator pedal and the shift lever are electronic and have no mechanical connection to the unit injection pumps or gearbox.

== Technical specifications ==
The Unimog 405 is a small-series production vehicle and has been offered with various different special factory options; the following technical specifications tables only list the most common models with standard factory options.

=== UGN ===
Technical specifications with standard options
Model	U 300				U 400			U 500		
Types' designation	405.100		405.120		405.102	405.122		405.200	405.220	
Variant	UGN									
Model year	2000									
Wheelbase	3080 mm		3600 mm		3080 mm	3600 mm		3350 mm	3900 mm	
Engine	OM 904 LA (Straight-4 Diesel engine, 3V OHV, unit injection pump direct injection system, FTG turbocharger, (Note: Fixed turbine geometry turbocharger with a fixed aspect ratio and a wastegate) intercooler)				OM 906 LA (Straight-6 Diesel engine, 3V OHV, unit injection pump direct injection system, FTG turbocharger, intercooler)	OM 904 LA (Straight-4 Diesel engine, 3V OHV, unit injection pump direct injection system, FTG turbocharger, intercooler)	OM 906 LA (Straight-6 Diesel engine, 3V OHV, unit injection pump direct injection system, FTG turbocharger, intercooler)			
Bore × stroke, displacement	102 mm × 130 mm, 4249 cm³				102 mm × 130 mm, 6374 cm³	102 mm × 130 mm, 4249 cm³	102 mm × 130 mm, 6374 cm³			
Rated power (80/1269/EEC)	110 kW at 2200/min	130 kW at 2200/min	110 kW at 2200/min	130 kW at 2200/min	170 kW at 2200/min	130 kW at 2200/min	170 kW at 2200/min	205 kW at 2200/min	170 kW at 2200/min	205 kW at 2200/min
Rated torque (80/1269/EEC)	580 N·m at 1200–1600/min	675 N·m at 1200–1600/min	580 N·m at 1200–1600/min	675 N·m at 1200–1600/min	810 N·m at 1200–1600/min	675 N·m at 1200–1600/min	810 N·m at 1200–1600/min	1100 N·m at 1200–1600/min	810 N·m at 1200–1600/min	1100 N·m at 1200–1600/min
Max. permissible mass	7500–10,200 kg				11,990–12,500 kg			15,500 kg		
Max. permissible front axle load	5100 kg				6700 kg			7500 kg		
Max. permissible rear axle load	5500 kg				7000 kg			8500 kg		
Height	2830 mm				2860 mm			2940 mm		
Width	2150 mm				2200 mm			2300 mm		
Length	5100 mm		5620 mm		5100 mm	5620 mm		5380 mm	6120 mm	
Front overhang	1150 mm									
Rear overhang	870 mm									

All technical specifications according to Wischhof et al. (2000). Note that this table only includes standard options. The OM 906 LA was also offered in the U 300 on request.

=== LUG ===
Technical specifications with standard options
Model	U 20	
Types' designation	405.050	
Variant	LUG	
Model year	2007	
Wheelbase	2700 mm	
Engine	OM 904 LA (Straight-4 Diesel engine, 3V OHV, unit injection pump direct injection system, FTG turbocharger, intercooler)	
Bore × stroke, displacement	102 mm × 130 mm, 4249 cm³	
Rated power (80/1269/EEC)	110 kW at 2200/min	130 kW at 2200/min
Rated torque (80/1269/EEC)	580 N·m at 1200–1600/min	675 N·m at 1200–1600/min
Max. permissible mass	7500–9300 kg	
Max. permissible front axle load	5100 kg	
Max. permissible rear axle load	5500 kg	
Height	2720 mm	
Width	2150 mm	
Length	4970 mm	
Front overhang	1350 mm	
Rear overhang	870 mm	

Technical specifications according to Achim Vogt

=== UGE ===
2013 model year

Technical specifications with standard options
Model	U 216	U 218	U 318	U 423		U 427		U 430		U 527		U 530	
Types' designation	405.090		405.104	405.105	405.125	405.110	405.125	405.110	405.125	405.202	405.222	405.202	405.222
Variant	UGE												
Model year	2013												
Wheelbase	2800 mm		3000 mm		3600 mm	3150 mm	3600 mm	3150 mm	3600 mm	3350 mm	3900 mm	3350 mm	3900 mm
Engine	OM 934 LA (Straight-4 Diesel engine, 4V DOHC, common-rail direct injection, turbocharger, intercooler)					OM 936 LA (Straight-6 Diesel engine, 4V DOHC, common-rail direct injection, turbocharger, intercooler)							
Engine types' designation	934.971			934.972		936.971						936.972	
Bore × stroke, displacement	110 mm × 135 mm, 5132 cm³					110 mm × 135 mm, 7698 cm³							
Rated power (80/1269/EEC)	115 kW at 2200/min	130 kW at 2200/min		170 kW at 2200/min		200 kW at 2200/min		220 kW at 2200/min		200 kW at 2200/min		220 kW at 2200/min	
Rated torque (80/1269/EEC)	650 N·m at 1200–1600/min	750 N·m at 1200–1600/min		900 N·m at 1200–1600/min		1100 N·m at 1200–1600/min		1200 N·m at 1200–1600/min		1100 N·m at 1200–1600/min		1200 N·m at 1200–1600/min	
Max. permissible mass	10,000 kg		11,000 kg	13,800 kg	14,000 kg					16,500 kg			
Max. permissible front axle load	5200 kg		5500 kg	6900 kg	7000 kg					7500 kg			
Max. permissible rear axle load	5500 kg		6000 kg	7800 kg	8000 kg					9500 kg			
Height	2855 mm		2845 mm	2900 mm									
Width	2200 mm									2300 mm			
Length	4980 mm		5155 mm	5150 mm	5755 mm	5300 mm	5755 mm	5300 mm	5755 mm	5440 mm	6215 mm	5440 mm	6215 mm
Rear overhang	860 mm	840 mm											1000 mm

Engine specifications according to Andreescu et al.; all other data according to Daimler AG

2022 model year

Technical specifications with standard options
Model	U 535
Types' designation	405.222
Variant	UGE
Model year	2022
Wheelbase	3900 mm
Engine	OM 936 LA (Straight-6 Diesel engine, 4V DOHC, common-rail direct injection, turbocharger, intercooler)
Engine types' designation	936.976
Bore × stroke, displacement	110 mm × 135 mm, 7698 cm³
Rated power (80/1269/EEC)	260 kW at 2200/min
Rated torque (80/1269/EEC)	1380 N·m at 1200–1600/min
Max. permissible mass	16,500 kg
Max. permissible front axle load	7500 kg
Max. permissible rear axle load	9500 kg
Height	2970 mm
Width	2300 mm
Length	6200 mm
