= Body control module =

Electronic control unit in a car

In automotive electronics, body control module or 'body computer' is a generic term for an electronic control unit responsible for monitoring and controlling various electronic accessories in a vehicle's body. Typically in a car the BCM controls the power windows, power mirrors, air conditioning, immobilizer system, central locking, etc. The BCM communicates with other on-board computers via the car's CAN bus system, and its main application is controlling load drivers – actuating relays that in turn perform actions in the vehicle such as locking the doors, flashing the turn signals (in older cars), or dimming the interior lighting.
