= Child safety lock =

Lock to prevent children from accessing dangerous items

A child safety lock is a special-purpose lock for cabinets, drawers, bottles, etc. that is designed to help prevent children from getting at any dangerous things or contents. Young children are naturally curious about their surroundings and will always explore, but as they may be unaware of dangerous substances or situations, the results can be fatal. Numerous cases of poisoning have resulted from eating brightly colored pills or spilling cleaning solvents.

== Containers ==
In the United States, child safety locking mechanisms have been required by law since 1970 on all containers for potentially dangerous medicines and household cleaning products. These laws are enforced by the Consumer Product Safety Commission. These locking mechanisms may take several forms, but the most common is a design that requires a tab to be pressed firmly as the lid is twisted. Great strength and dexterity are not required to open the bottle, but the process is deliberately made to be unintuitive, and the children who might recklessly eat pills are unable to decipher the opening instructions. Parents and guardians are firmly admonished to keep all such containers out of the reach of children anyway, as no locking device is foolproof. It has become common practice in households to keep medicines and pills in high cabinets (sometimes locked) for safety. Cleaning agents, however, are still generally kept under sinks, where they are accessible.

== Cabinet doors ==
Another type of lock is an inexpensive device which can be easily installed into drawers, cabinets, or other openables to prevent easy opening. It consists of a bendable plastic rod with a blunt hook on one side, and is situated on the inside of the drawer or cabinet. The hook catches on part of the drawer or door and prevents opening unless the rod is bent downward simultaneously to disengage the hook. These devices are helpful to pet owners as well — a typical housecat may be able to paw open a cabinet filled with food, but would have trouble operating the hook mechanism. Also available are electromagnetic cabinet locking devices that are activated via remote control.

Certain locks are available specifically for child proofing. These locks have the same function as the other lock design: to lock away valuables, food, or dangers from unwanted guests. However, these locks have a design that resembles a strap like lock. It attaches with two adhesive stickers and opens with a small slider. This slider was specifically designed to be tough for smaller children to get open, such as the medicine/cleaning product containers. Because of its latch design, it is not only able to strap to cabinets, but also other objects of the like. This includes but is not limited to fridges, toilets, garbage cans, drawers, microwaves, etc...

== Magnetic safety locks ==
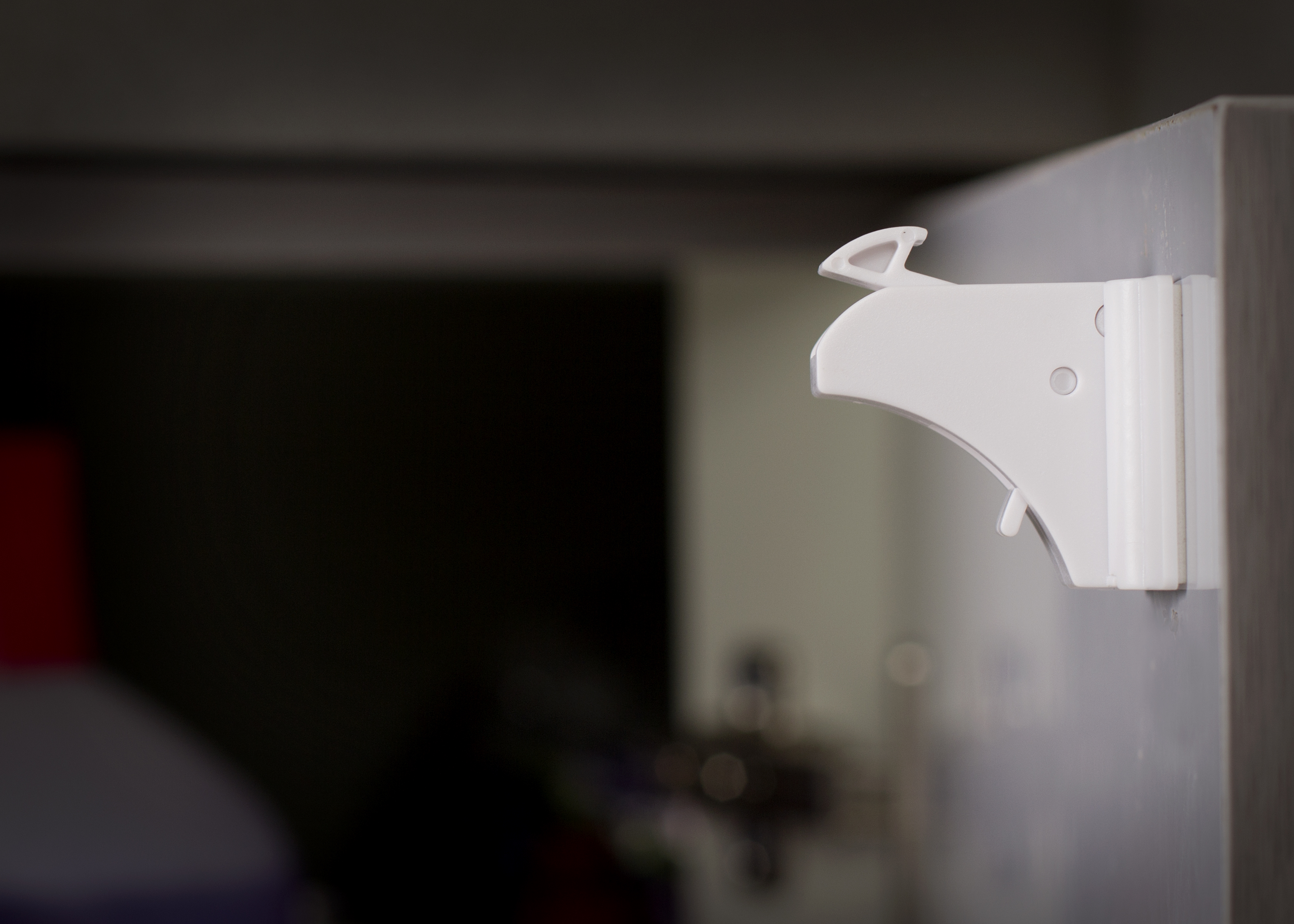
Magnetic safety lock

In recent years, new hidden magnetic cabinet locks opened by a magnetic key have become widespread. Their advantage is the ability to lock cabinets and drawers, even without handles, while leaving the decor clean and smooth.

== Automotive ==
Patented 7 June 1949 by Joseph M. Schumann, child safety locks are built into the rear doors of most cars to prevent rear seat passengers from opening the doors both during transit and while the vehicle is stationary. With an update to the Code of Federal Regulations in 1985 vehicles sold in the US began installing rear door child safety locks on all models. While referred to as child safety locks, this device prevents operation of the interior door handle for any passenger using the engaged door's interior handle, preventing exit unless the rear window can be lowered and the exterior handle engaged, or the passenger relocates to the front driver's seat.

The lock is typically engaged via a small switch on the edge of the door that is only accessible when the door is open. Some cars implement the child lock control as a rotary mechanism which can only be operated with a key. This design ensures the child lock remains in position, preventing passengers from changing the lock position when the door is open. Once the door is closed, control of these two mechanical type child locks is completely inaccessible to passengers. Starting in 1999, manufacturers began using electronic child locks activated from the driver position via a door control unit, although Nissan offered manual, remote controlled child locks on their Pulsar/Cherry as early as 1982.

According to 49 CFR 571.206 S4.3.1, when the safety lock is engaged, it "prevents operation of the interior door handle or other interior latch release control and requires separate actions to unlock the door and operate the interior door handle or other interior latch release control," effectively locking passengers inside the vehicle.

== Pool fencing ==
Child safety locks can be fitted to pool fencing in order to make a pool area safer.

In Australia, pool fencing is required by law. It is stipulated that the lock should be attached on the side of the fence facing toward the pool, so that anyone entering would have to reach over the top of the boundary. Failing this, the child safety lock should be at least 1.8 metres (5.9 ft) off the ground.

== See also ==
- Parental controls
- Child-resistant packaging
