= Door control unit =

In automotive electronics, a door control unit (DCU) is an embedded system that manages electrical functions associated with a vehicle's doors. Modern vehicles contain multiple electronic control units (ECUs), among which the DCU is a secondary component.

A DCU controls and monitors electronic accessories located in the door. Vehicles typically have multiple doors, so DCUs may be installed in each door individually or implemented as a centralized system. The unit associated with the driver's door often includes additional functions, such as locking controls, switch pads and child lock features. In most configurations, the driver door module acts as the master, with other modules operating as slaves.

== Functions ==
- Manual and automatic window operation
- Global window open–close functions
- Child lock mechanisms
- Mirror adjustment and folding
- Door locking and unlocking (latch control)

Some vehicles also integrate features such as puddle lamps and blind spot indicator systems (BLIS) into the DCU.
