= DC Universe (disambiguation) =

The DC Universe is the fictional shared universe that serves as a setting for DC Comics stories, for most of the interlinked mainstream DC comics.

DC Universe may also refer to:

- DC Universe (franchise) (DCU), a shared universe of superhero films and TV series developed by DC Studios
- DC Universe (streaming service), a streaming service featuring exclusive television series based on DC Comics
  - DC Universe Infinite, a digital comic subscription service replacing DC Universe
- DC Universe (toyline), a range of toys based on DC Comics characters
  - DC Universe Classics, a sub-line of the DC Universe toys
- DC Universe (themed area), multiple themed lands at Six Flags amusement parks
- Multiverse (DC Comics), the collection of most of the fictional universes established by DC Comics
- DC Animated Universe (DCAU; est. 1992), a fictional universe, the setting for several of the animated series based on DC Comics
- DC Animated Movie Universe (DCAMU; 2013–2020), a fictional universe, the setting of several animated films based on DC Comics
- DC Universe Online, a video game based on the main DC Universe
- DC Universe Animated Original Movies, direct-to-video animated films
- DC Universe Roleplaying Game, a role-playing game released in 1999
- DC Universe, a number of DC Comics comic books:
  - DC Universe #0, a 2008 one-shot that acted as a prologue for Final Crisis
  - DC Universe: Decisions, a 2008–2009 limited series
  - DC Universe Holiday Bash, three end-of-year specials published between 1996 and 1998
  - DC Universe: Last Will & Testament, a 2008 one-shot
  - DC Universe: Legacies, a 10-issue limited series
  - DC Universe Online: Legends, a 26-issue dual-weekly limited series, based on the DC Universe Online game
- DC Extended Universe (DCEU; 2013–2023), a series of superhero films and television series based on DC Comics characters

== See also ==
- List of DC Multiverse worlds
- Arrowverse, the setting for various TV series on The CW.
